= 2024 Saskatchewan general election =

Canadian provincial election

- October 28, 2024

61 seats in the Legislative Assembly of Saskatchewan 31 seats needed for a majority
- Opinion polls
- Turnout: 56.77% ▲3.91%
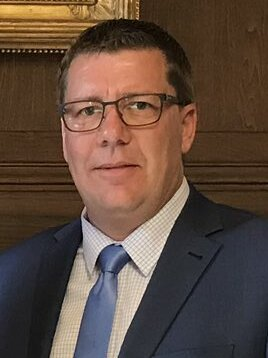

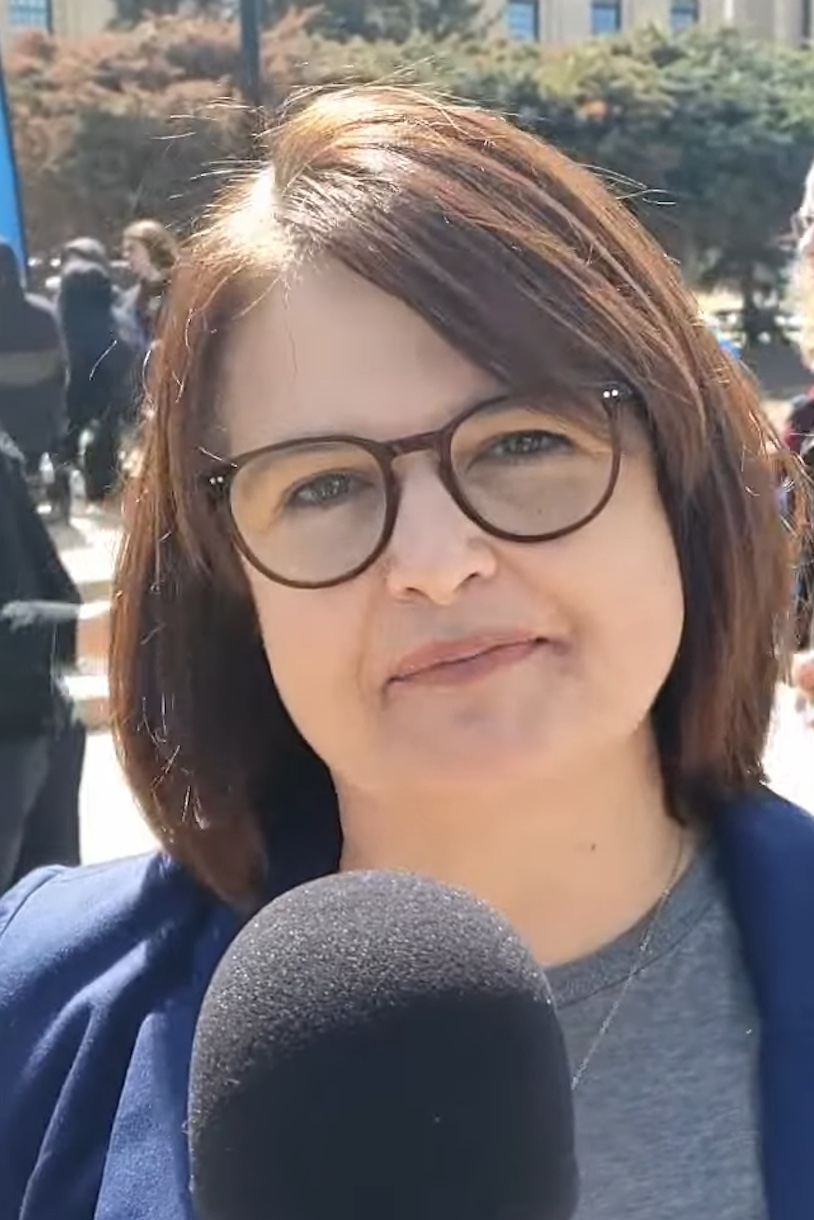
	First party	Second party
Leader	Scott Moe	Carla Beck
Party	Saskatchewan	New Democratic
Leader since	January 27, 2018	June 26, 2022
Leader's seat	Rosthern-Shellbrook	Regina Lakeview
Last election	48 seats, 61.12%	13 seats, 31.82%
Seats before	42	14
Seats won	34	27
Seat change	▼8	▲13
Popular vote	244,037	188,373
Percentage	52.24%	40.33%
Swing	▼8.88 pp	▲8.49 pp
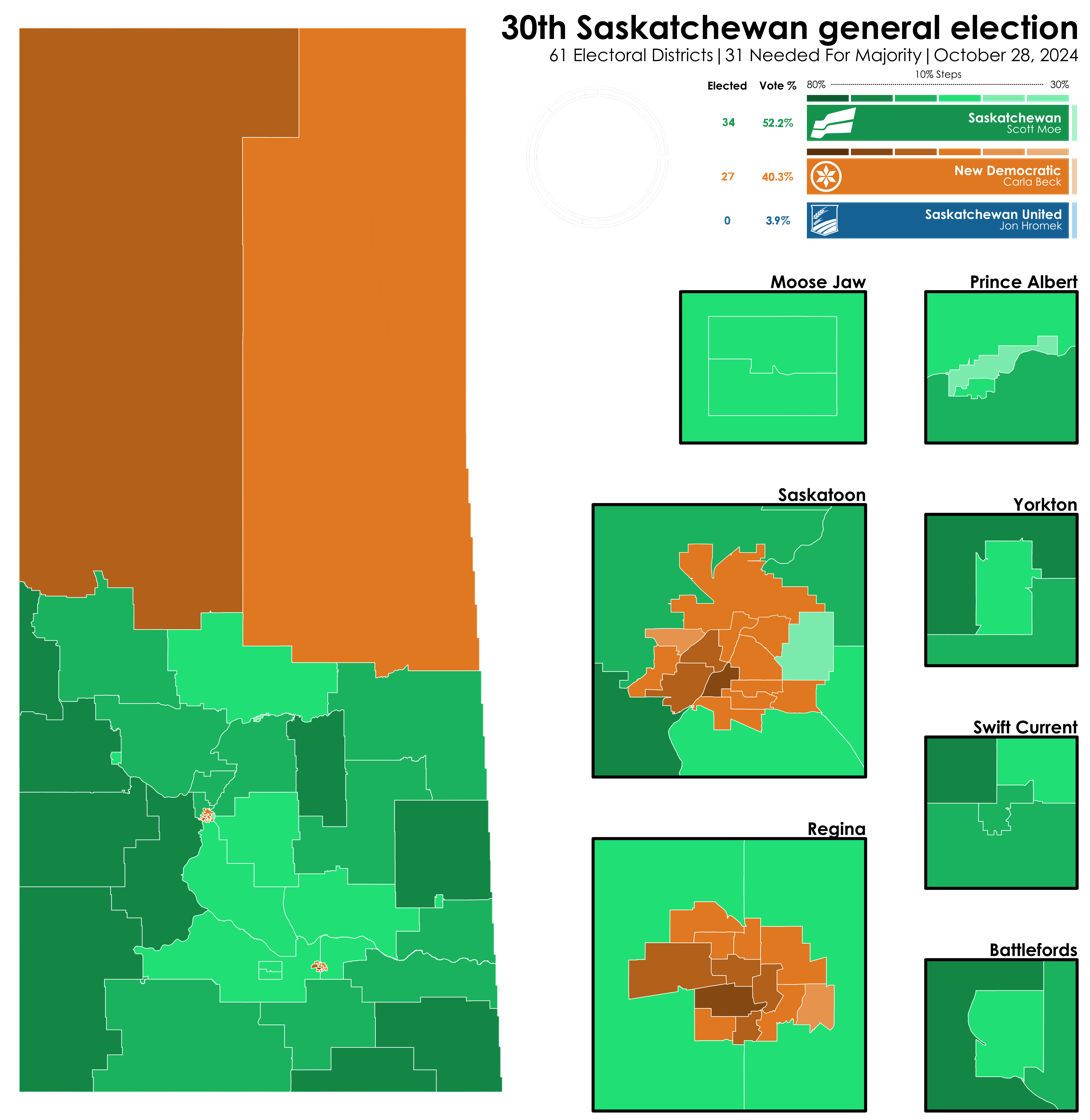
- Riding map based on new boundaries
Premier before election
Scott Moe
Saskatchewan
Premier after election
Scott Moe
Saskatchewan

The 2024 Saskatchewan general election was held on October 28, 2024, to elect members of the Legislative Assembly of Saskatchewan.

The incumbent Saskatchewan Party government, led by Premier Scott Moe since 2018, sought re-election to a fifth consecutive term. The Saskatchewan Party's primary opponent, the Saskatchewan New Democratic Party (NDP) led by Carla Beck, sought to lead the NDP to its first government since 2007. This was the first general election to feature the Saskatchewan United Party (SUP).

The Saskatchewan Party won enough seats to form its fifth consecutive majority government, claiming the majority of rural ridings. Its majority was reduced from eleven seats to three by a resurgent NDP—which achieved its best electoral performance since 2007 by taking every seat in Regina and all but one in Saskatoon. The SUP lost its only seat, which had been held by party founder Nadine Wilson. The results underscored the urban–rural divide between the two parties' constituencies.

== Background ==
Since 2010, the Legislative Assembly has had a fixed four-year term. According to the 2019 amendment to the Legislative Assembly Act, 2007, "the first general election after the coming into force of this subsection must be held on Monday, October 26, 2020". Subsequent elections, must occur "on the last Monday of October in the fourth calendar year after the last general election". However, the act also provides that if the election period would overlap with a federal election period, the provincial election is to be postponed until the first Monday of the following April; in this case: April 7, 2025. The fixed election law does not infringe on the Lieutenant Governor's right to dissolve the Legislative Assembly at an earlier date on the Premier's advice.

=== Legislative summary ===
Summary of the 29th Legislative Assembly of Saskatchewan

Party	Leader	Seats	
Party	Leader	2020	At dissolution
Saskatchewan	Scott Moe	48	42
New Democratic	Carla Beck	13	14
Saskatchewan United	Jon Hromek	–	1
Independent		–	3
Vacant			1
Total		61	61

=== List of registered provincial political parties in Saskatchewan ===
Party	Leader
Buffalo	Phillip Zajac
Green	Naomi Hunter
New Democratic	Carla Beck
Progress	Teunis Peters (i)
Progressive Conservative	Rose Marie Buscholl
Saskatchewan	Scott Moe
Saskatchewan United	Jon Hromek

=== Redistribution ===
The Saskatchewan Provincial Boundaries Commission drew a new map for Saskatchewan, as required by the Constituency Boundaries Act, 1993, which was subsequently ratified by the Saskatchewan Legislature. The Legislative Assembly continued to consist of 61 members.

The following changes took effect:

Abolished	New
Renaming of constituencies
Moosomin	Moosomin-Montmartre
Saskatoon Northwest	Saskatoon Chief Mistawasis
Abolition of constituencies
Regina Gardiner Park (Note: parts going to Regina University, Regina Northeast, Regina Wascana Plains and Regina Douglas Park)	
Regina Rosemont	
Drawn from other constituencies
	Regina Mount Royal (Note: from parts of Regina Rosemont, Regina Pasqua and Lumsden-Morse)
	Regina South Albert (Note: from parts of Regina University, Regina Pasqua and Lumsden-Morse)
Division of constituencies
Martensville-Warman	Martensville-Blairmore; Warman
Reorganization of constituencies
Arm River; Saskatoon Stonebridge-Dakota	Dakota-Arm River; Saskatoon Stonebridge
Biggar-Sask Valley; Kindersley; Rosetown-Elrose	Kindersley-Biggar; Rosetown-Delisle
Estevan; Weyburn-Big Muddy	Estevan-Big Muddy; Weyburn-Bengough
Indian Head-Milestone; Regina Wascana Plains	Regina Wascana Plains; White City-Qu'appelle
Saskatoon Silverspring-Sutherland; Saskatoon University	Saskatoon Silverspring; Saskatoon University-Sutherland

=== Campaign ===
Health care, education, and the economy have been considered to be among the top issues heading into the election, with the incumbent Saskatchewan Party and Saskatchewan NDP focusing primarily on these issues.

The province's health care system has been affected by staffing shortages, especially in rural areas of the province, which CUPE credited primarily to the Saskatchewan Health Authority's reliance on part-time workers as opposed to full-time positions. This has led to significant increases in vacancies and service disruptions since 2019. In early-October 2024, the emergency room of Saskatoon's Royal University Hospital operated at 350% capacity after other nearby facilities were unable to take patients in, causing it to run out of beds, stretchers, and oxygen. The Saskatchewan Party touted its effort to recruit nursing graduates, and internationally trained nurses from countries such as the Philippines. It also stated that it would offer at-home screening kits for HPV, and a refundable tax credit of up to $10,000 for fertility treatment. Carla Beck stated that the NDP would invest $1.1 billion into critical front line services over the next four years, and focus on improving working conditions to achieve employee retention. Beck criticized Scott Moe during the leaders' debate for not making any specific funding commitments for health care in his party's platform.

The Saskatchewan Teachers' Federation (STF) has been in a labour dispute with the provincial government since May 2023, citing a lack of action on issues such as classroom size and complexity. After rotating strikes since January 2024, the STF enacted an indefinite work-to-rule beginning in April 2024. The Saskatchewan Party and NDP both pledged to place increased funding into education, with the Sask Party planning to spend $156 million on infrastructure and $336 million on classroom sizes and complexity, and the NDP planning to increase the education budget by $2 billion over four years to fund classroom size and complexity, infrastructure, and special needs programs. Beck also promised a new high school in White City, and the implementation of a healthy food program.

On October 17, expanding upon the Parents' Bill of Rights introduced in 2023, Moe announced that his "first order of business" after reelection would be to immediately enact rules requiring school students to use the changing rooms that correspond to their biological sex. The Saskatchewan Party stated that it had "received calls and correspondence" regarding an October 16 report from the Western Standard, which detailed a complaint from the parent of a rural school student who had seen two trans girls using the girls' changing room. The Canadian Press reported that a parent of the two students was one of the NDP's candidates. The proposal was not in the platform published by the Saskatchewan Party, and faced criticism from the NDP, STF, and LGBT rights advocates for harming the safety of transgender students. Regina Douglas Park MLA Nicole Sarauer stated that "no leader, community, political or otherwise, should aid in anyway to the outing or othering of children." Saskatchewan Party officials denied it was directly involved with the outing, and Moe later claimed he was unaware of the two children, and that "I never once spoke to any of the individuals, nor will I, nor should anyone." In November 2024, Moe walked back his declaration and stated that he had misspoke, saying that his first order of business would be to form a cabinet, and that the Minister of Education would enter into a consulting phase on policies with school boards following municipal and school board elections.

On the economic front, Moe stated that he would reduce personal income taxes, expand the tuition rebate offered in its graduate retention program, remove the carbon tax on heating oil, and establish new tax credits and rebates for first-time homeowners and families with children involved in the arts or sports. Beck stated that she would balance the province's budget within four years and cut $58 million in "Saskatchewan Party waste" within her first year of office. Beck also stated that she would suspend the provincial gas tax for six months, end the PST for groceries and children's clothing, and establish an accountability commission to investigate issues such as cost overruns on government projects.

Jon Hromek launched the Saskatchewan United Party's campaign on October 2, 2024, describing it as a "true conservative option", and hoping to have at least two candidates elected to the Legislative Assembly. Its platform focused on goals such as cutting the provincial sales tax, ending the fuel tax, lowering property taxes for homeowners over 65, reviewing the royalty framework for potash, privatization of health care, a commitment to coal and natural gas energy and the suspension of green energy projects, removing "ideology" and "indoctrination" from school curricula (including gender identity and the climate crisis), and proposals to prohibit transgender women from occupying women-only spaces or competing in women's sports. It was suggested that the Saskatchewan United Party could potentially split the right-wing vote with the Saskatchewan Party, although Scott Moe downplayed these concerns.

On October 22, it was reported that the front window of the office of Saskatchewan Party candidate Rahul Singh had been vandalized, with damage resembling small bullet holes. The party initially claimed that the vandalism was the result of a gun attack. The Regina Police Service stated that it had investigated a report of mischief reported on the evening of October 21, and that there was no evidence that firearms were involved.

The NDP has received endorsements from multiple current and former Saskatchewan Party members and MLAs, including from Speaker Randy Weekes.

== Timeline ==
29th Legislative Assembly of Saskatchewan - Movement in seats held up to the election (2020–2024)
Party	2020	Gain/(loss) due to							2024
Party	2020	Died in Office	Leaves caucus	Resignation as MLA	Removed from caucus	Switching allegiance	Byelection gain	Byelection hold	2024
Saskatchewan	48	(1)	(3)	(3)	(1)		1	1	42
New Democratic	13			(2)			2	1	14
Saskatchewan United	–					1			1
Independent	–		3		1	(1)			3
Vacant	–	1		5			(3)	(2)	1
Total	61	–	–	–	–	–	–	–	61

Changes in seats held (2020–2024)
Seat	Before				Change		
Seat	Date	Member	Party	Reason	Date	Member	Party
Athabasca	August 10, 2021	Buckley Belanger	█ New Democratic	Resignation	February 15, 2022	Jim Lemaigre	█ Saskatchewan
Saskatchewan Rivers	September 30, 2021	Nadine Wilson	█ Saskatchewan	Resigned from caucus			█ Independent
Saskatchewan Rivers	November 30, 2022	Nadine Wilson	█ Independent	Designated as Sask United leader			█ Sask. United
Saskatoon Meewasin	July 1, 2022	Ryan Meili	█ New Democratic	Resignation	September 26, 2022	Nathaniel Teed	█ New Democratic
Regina Coronation Park	February 10, 2023	Mark Docherty	█ Saskatchewan	Resignation	August 10, 2023	Noor Burki	█ New Democratic
Lumsden-Morse	March 10, 2023	Lyle Stewart	█ Saskatchewan	Resignation	August 10, 2023	Blaine McLeod	█ Saskatchewan
Regina Walsh Acres	March 28, 2023	Derek Meyers	█ Saskatchewan	Died in office	August 10, 2023	Jared Clarke	█ New Democratic
Cut Knife-Turtleford	November 17, 2023	Ryan Domotor	█ Saskatchewan	Removed from caucus			█ Independent
Moose Jaw Wakamow	January 30, 2024	Greg Lawrence	█ Saskatchewan	Resigned from caucus			█ Independent
Biggar-Sask Valley	May 15, 2024	Randy Weekes	█ Saskatchewan	Resigned from party, but remained as Speaker			█ Independent
Saskatoon Northwest	June 10, 2024	Gordon Wyant	█ Saskatchewan	Resignation			█ Vacant

=== 2020 ===
- October 26: The Saskatchewan Party wins a majority government in the 2020 Saskatchewan general election. The Saskatchewan New Democratic Party (NDP) forms the official opposition. No other parties won seats in the election.

=== 2022 ===
- February 18: Ryan Meili announces his intention to resign as NDP leader. He intends to remain leader until a successor is chosen.
- June 26: Carla Beck is elected as Leader of the Saskatchewan NDP.
- November 30: The Saskatchewan United Party is registered with Elections Saskatchewan, with MLA Nadine Wilson its leader.

=== 2023 ===
- July 19: The Saskatchewan Liberal Party changes their party name to the Saskatchewan Progress Party.

=== 2024 ===
- May 16: Nadine Wilson stepped down as leader of the Saskatchewan United Party, and Jon Hromek was appointed as the new leader.
- October 1: The election campaign begins.
- October 12: Candidate nomination deadline at 2pm.
- October 22–26: Voting week.
- October 28: Final day of voting, first preliminary count. Saskatchewan Party wins fifth consecutive majority government.
- October 30: Second preliminary count, mail-in ballots received by October 26 counted.
- November 9: Final count, mail-in ballots received between October 27 and November 7 counted along with all hospital and remand centre votes. Returning officers will be verifying the numbers in each electoral district.

== Candidates ==
Nominations closed on October 12.

=== Candidates by Party ===
Party	Leader	Candidates
Saskatchewan	Scott Moe	61
New Democratic	Carla Beck	61
Green	Naomi Hunter	58
Saskatchewan United	Jon Hromek	31
Buffalo	Philip Zajac	16
Progressive Conservative	Rose Marie Buscholl	11
Progress	Teunis Peters	3
Independent		2

Candidate contests
Candidates nominated	Constituencies	Party								
Candidates nominated	Constituencies	Sask	NDP	Green	SUP	Buff	PC	Prog	Ind	Totals
3	18	18	18	16	1	1				54
4	27	27	27	26	16	5	4	2	1	108
5	15	15	15	15	13	9	6	1	1	75
6	1	1	1	1	1	1	1			6
Total	61	61	61	58	31	16	11	3	2	243

=== Incumbents not standing for re-election ===
Retiring incumbents
Affiliation (Note: At dissolution)	MLA	Constituency	Held office since
Sask	Steven Bonk	Moosomin	2016
Sask	Fred Bradshaw	Carrot River Valley	2007
Sask	Dustin Duncan	Weyburn-Big Muddy	2006
Sask	Ken Francis	Kindersley	2018
Sask	Marv Friesen	Saskatoon Riversdale	2020
Sask	Gary Grewal	Regina Northeast	2020
Sask	Joe Hargrave	Prince Albert Carlton	2016
Sask	Donna Harpauer	Humboldt-Watrous (Note: Previously MLA for Watrous (1999–2003))	1999
Sask	Delbert Kirsch	Batoche	2003
Sask	Don McMorris	Indian Head-Milestone	1999
Sask	Don Morgan	Saskatoon Southeast	2003
Sask	Hugh Nerlien	Kelvington-Wadena	2016
Sask	Greg Ottenbreit	Yorkton	2007
Sask	Dana Skoropad	Arm River	2020
NDP	Jennifer Bowes	Saskatoon University	2020
NDP	Doyle Vermette	Cumberland	2008
Independent	Ryan Domotor (Note: Previously elected under the Saskatchewan Party banner)	Cut Knife-Turtleford	2020
Independent	Greg Lawrence	Moose Jaw Wakamow	2011
Failed to secure renomination
Sask	Terry Dennis	Canora-Pelly	2016
Independent	Randy Weekes (Note: Currently Speaker of the Legislative Assembly of Saskatchewan.) (Note: The Biggar-Sask Valley constituency was eliminated following redistribution, prompting Weekes, then a Saskatchewan Party MLA, to seek the party's nomination in Kindersley-Biggar, which includes a portion of the former Biggar-Sask Valley constituency. Weekes later left the Saskatchewan Party after losing the nomination.)	Biggar-Sask Valley (Note: Previously MLA for Biggar (2003–2016) and Redberry Lake (1999–2003))	1999

== Candidates by riding ==
Candidates in bold represent cabinet members and the Speaker of the Legislative Assembly. Party leaders are italicized. The symbol † indicates incumbent MLAs who are not running again. The symbol ‡ indicates incumbent MLAs who are running again in a different district.

=== Northwest Saskatchewan ===
Electoral district	Candidates					Incumbent
Electoral district	Saskatchewan	NDP	SUP	Buffalo	Green	Incumbent
Athabasca	Jim Lemaigre	Leroy Laliberte			Raven Reid	Jim Lemaigre
Cut Knife-Turtleford	James Thorsteinson	Clayton Poole	Steve Gessner		Holly Ennis	Ryan Domotor†
Lloydminster	Colleen Young	Adam Tremblay	Joshua Bloom		Patrick McNally	Colleen Young
Meadow Lake	Jeremy Harrison	Miles Nachbaur	Denis Allchurch		Candice Turner	Jeremy Harrison
Rosthern-Shellbrook	Scott Moe	Mark Thunderchild	Cody Lockhart		Janice Dongworth	Scott Moe
The Battlefords	Jeremy Cockrill	Tom Kroczynski		Dale Richarson	Sara Piotrofsky	Jeremy Cockrill

=== Northeast Saskatchewan ===
Electoral district	Candidates					Incumbent
Electoral district	Saskatchewan	NDP	SUP	Green	Other	Incumbent
Batoche	Darlene Rowden	Trina Miller	Erin Nicole Spencer	Hamish Graham		Delbert Kirsch†
Canora-Pelly	Sean Wilson	Wynn Fedorchuk		Casimira Rimando	Niall Schofield (Buff.)	Terry Dennis†
Carrot River Valley	Terri Bromm	CJ Binkley	Shauna Stanley Seymour	Liam Becker Lau		Fred Bradshaw†
Cumberland	Gregory Seib	Jordan McPhail		Siwichis Bird-Paddy	Nasser Dean Chalifoux (Ind.)	Doyle Vermette†
Kelvington-Wadena	Chris Beaudry	Lorne Schroeder	Clint Gottinger	Gillian Halyk		Hugh Nerlien†
Melfort	Todd Goudy	Melanie Dyck	Dave Moore	Tristan St. Germain		Todd Goudy
Prince Albert Carlton	Kevin Kasun	Carolyn Brost Strom	Denneil Carpenter	Andrew Muirhead		Joe Hargrave†
Prince Albert Northcote	Alana Ross	Nicole Rancourt	Terri Davis	Jarren Jones		Alana Ross
Saskatchewan Rivers	Eric Schmalz	Doug Racine	Nadine Wilson	Alesha Bruce	Bernard Lalonde (P.C.)	Nadine Wilson

=== West Central Saskatchewan ===
Electoral district	Candidates						Incumbent
Electoral district	Saskatchewan	NDP	SUP	Buffalo	Green	Other	Incumbent
Dakota-Arm River	Barret Kropf	Jordan Wiens	Darren Ebenal		Joseph Reynolds	Raymond L. Carrick (P.C.)	Dana Skoropad†; Arm River
Humboldt-Watrous	Racquel Hilbert	Kevin Fallis	Carrie Ann Hradecki	Megan Christianson	Sharon Thibault	Rose Buscholl (P.C.)	Donna Harpauer†
Kindersley-Biggar	Kim Gartner	Cindy Hoppe		Jeff Wortman	Darcy Robilliard	Wade Sira (Ind.)	Ken Francis†; Kindersley
Martensville-Blairmore	Jamie Martens	Tammy Pike			Brittney Ricottone		Terry Jenson‡ Martensville-Warman
Rosetown-Delisle	Jim Reiter	Brenda Edel			Sean Muirhead		Jim Reiter; Rosetown-Elrose
Warman	Terry Jenson	Erica Baerwald	Andrea Early	Mark Friesen	Adriana Hackl Pinno		Randy Weekes†; Biggar-Sask Valley

=== Southwest Saskatchewan ===
Electoral district	Candidates				Incumbent
Electoral district	Saskatchewan	NDP	Green	Other	Incumbent
Cypress Hills	Doug Steele	Clare McNab		Doug Wilson (Buff.)	Doug Steele
Lumsden-Morse	Blaine McLeod	Chauntel Baudu	Isaiah Hunter	Jon Hromek (SUP)	Blaine McLeod
Lumsden-Morse	Blaine McLeod	Chauntel Baudu	Isaiah Hunter	Megan Torrie (P.C.)	Blaine McLeod
Moose Jaw North	Tim McLeod	Cheantelle Fisher	Kimberly Epp		Tim McLeod
Moose Jaw Wakamow	Megan Patterson	Melissa Patterson	Michael Gardiner		Greg Lawrence†
Swift Current	Everett Hindley	Jay Kimball	George Watson	Constance P Maffenbeier (Buff.)	Everett Hindley
Wood River	David Marit	Mike Topola	Melvin Pylychuk	Clint Arnason (P.C.)	Dave Marit
Wood River	David Marit	Mike Topola	Melvin Pylychuk	Todd McIntyre (SUP)	Dave Marit

=== Southeast Saskatchewan ===
Electoral district	Candidates					Incumbent
Electoral district	Saskatchewan	NDP	SUP	Buffalo	Green	Incumbent
Cannington	Daryl Harrison	Dianne Twietmeyer	Barbara Helfrick	Michelle Krieger	Natalie Lund-Clysdale	Daryl Harrison
Estevan-Big Muddy	Lori Carr	Phil Smith	Andrew Cey	Phillip Zajac	Billy Patterson	Lori Carr; Estevan
Last Mountain-Touchwood	Travis Keisig	Thera Nordal	Gene Unruh	Elvin Mandziak		Travis Keisig
Melville-Saltcoats	Warren Kaeding	Karen Hovind	Curtis Brooks	Frank Serfas	Micah Mang	Warren Kaeding
Moosomin-Montmartre	Kevin Weedmark	Chris Ball	Adam Erickson	Otis Ayre	Remi Rheault	Steven Bonk†; Moosomin
Weyburn-Bengough	Michael Weger	Seth Lendrum	Rose McInnes	Andrew Shanaida	North Hunter	Dustin Duncan†; Weyburn-Big Muddy
White City-Qu'appelle	Brad Crassweller	Grady Birns	Darcy Thiele			Don McMorris†; Indian Head-Milestone
Yorkton	David Chan	Lenore Pinder	Doug Forster	Timothy Kasprick	Valerie Brooks	Greg Ottenbreit†

=== Saskatoon East ===
Electoral district	Candidates					Incumbent
Electoral district	Saskatchewan	NDP	SUP	Green	Progress	Incumbent
Saskatoon Churchill-Wildwood	Lisa Lambert	Keith Jorgenson		Morgan McAdam		Lisa Lambert
Saskatoon Eastview	Francis Kreiser	Matt Love	Brad McAvoy	Kendra Anderson		Matt Love
Saskatoon Nutana	Mumtaz Naseeb	Erika Ritchie		Whitney Greenleaf		Erika Ritchie
Saskatoon Silverspring	Paul Merriman	Hugh Gordon		Jackie Hanson		Paul Merriman; Saskatoon Silverspring-Sutherland
Saskatoon Southeast	John Owojori	Brittney Senger	Greg Brkich	Mohammad Abushar		Don Morgan†
Saskatoon Stonebridge	Bronwyn Eyre	Darcy Warrington		Cheryl Mazil	Jahangir J Valiani	Bronwyn Eyre; Saskatoon Stonebridge-Dakota
Saskatoon University-Sutherland	Ghislaine McLeod	Tajinder Grewal	Dawne Badrock	Felipe Guerra		Jennifer Bowes†; Saskatoon University
Saskatoon Willowgrove	Ken Cheveldayoff	Alana Wakula	William Hughes	Tawe Morin		Ken Cheveldayoff

=== Saskatoon West ===
Electoral district	Candidates				Incumbent
Electoral district	Saskatchewan	NDP	Green	Buffalo	Incumbent
Saskatoon Centre	Dale Hrynuik	Betty Nippi-Albright	Darry Michelle		Betty Nippi-Albright
Saskatoon Chief Mistawasis	Parminder Singh	Don McBean	Shane Caellaigh		Vacant; Saskatoon Northwest
Saskatoon Fairview	Zahid Sandhu	Vicki Mowat	Phoenix Neault	Tony Ollenberger	Vicki Mowat
Saskatoon Meewasin	Maureen Alice Torr	Nathaniel Teed	Jacklin Andrews		Nathaniel Teed
Saskatoon Riversdale	Olu Fakoyejo	Kim Breckner	Naomi Hunter		Marv Friesen†
Saskatoon Westview	David Buckingham	April ChiefCalf	Jupiter Neault		David Buckingham

=== Regina ===
Electoral district	Candidates					Incumbent
Electoral district	Saskatchewan	NDP	Green	PC	Other	Incumbent
Regina Coronation Park	Riaz Ahmad	Noor Burki	Maria Krznar	Olasehinde Ben Adebayo		Noor Burki
Regina Douglas Park	Ken Grey	Nicole Sarauer	Victor Lau			Nicole Sarauer
Regina Elphinstone-Centre	Caesar Khan	Meara Conway	Jim Elliott		Nathan Bruce (Prog.)	Meara Conway
Regina Elphinstone-Centre	Caesar Khan	Meara Conway	Jim Elliott		Pamela Carpenter (SUP)	Meara Conway
Regina Lakeview	Sarah Wright	Carla Beck	Heather MacNeill	Victor Teece		Carla Beck
Regina Mount Royal	Jaspreet Mander	Trent Wotherspoon	Regina Demyen			Trent Wotherspoon; Regina Rosemont
Regina Northeast	Rahul Singh	Jacqueline Roy	Anthony Thomas Majore		Kate Tremblay (Prog.)	Gary Grewal†
Regina Pasqua	Muhammad Fiaz	Bhajan Brar	Ekaterina Cabylis	Justin Parnell	Shannon Chapple (Buff.)	Muhammad Fiaz
Regina Rochdale	Laura Ross	Joan Pratchler	Irene Browatzke			Laura Ross
Regina South Albert	Khushdil (Lucky) Mehrok	Aleana Young	Leonie Williams	David Teece		Aleana Young; Regina University
Regina University	Gene Makowsky	Sally Housser	Cedar Park	Corie Rempel		Gene Makowsky; Regina Gardiner Park
Regina Walsh Acres	Liaqat Ali	Jared Clarke	Dianna Holigroski		Bonnie Farrell (SUP)	Jared Clarke
Regina Wascana Plains	Christine Tell	Brent Blakley	Bo Chen	Larry Buchinski	Dustin Plett (SUP)	Christine Tell

== Opinion polls ==

Opinion polls
Polling firm	Client	Dates conducted	Source	SK Party	NDP	Buffalo	Green	PC	Progress	United	Others	Margin of error	Sample size	Polling method	Lead
2024 general election		Oct 28, 2024		52.3%	40.4%	0.7%	1.8%	1.0%	0.2%	3.9%	0.1%	—N/a	—N/a	—N/a	11.9%
Forum Research	N/A	Oct 25–27, 2024		46%	49%	—	2.1%	—	—	—	2.9%	3.0%	2,934	Smart IVR	3%
Research Co.	N/A	Oct 25–27, 2024		46%	48%	—	—	—	—	—	5%	4.5%	500	Online	2%
Liaison Strategies	NEPMCC	Oct 24–25, 2024		46%	49%	—	—	—	—	—	5%	3.63%	729	Smart IVR	3%
Mainstreet Research	N/A	Oct 22–24, 2024		45%	49%	—	—	—	—	—	7%	3.4%	820	Smart IVR	4%
Insightrix	CTV News	Oct 18–20, 2024		45%	50%	—	—	—	—	—	5%	3.5%	802	Online	5%
Cardinal Research	N/A	Oct 9–24, 2024		49%	43%	1%	—	—	—	3%	3%	3.5%	798	Telephone	6%
Research Co.	N/A	Oct 7–9, 2024		51%	43%	—	3%	—	—	—	2%	4.8%	500	Online	8%
Janet Brown Opinion Research/Trend Research	CUPE Saskatchewan	Sep 23 – Oct 3, 2024		45%	40%	1%	1%	2%	1%	1%	0%	3.5%	800	Telephone	5%
Mainstreet Research	N/A	Sep 14–17, 2024		50%	40%	—	—	—	—	—	11%	3.3%	857	Smart IVR	10%
Insightrix	CTV News	Sep 10–12, 2024		48%	49%	—	—	—	—	—	4%	3.3%	806	Online	1%
Angus Reid	N/A	Aug 16–20, 2024		49%	42%	—	—	—	—	5%	4%	3%	802	Online	7%
Insightrix	N/A	July 23–26, 2024		47%	48%	—	—	—	—	—	5%	3.3%	860	Online	1%
May 16, 2024			Nadine Wilson steps down as leader of the Saskatchewan United Party and Jon Hromek is appointed as the new leader.												
Angus Reid	N/A	Feb 28 – Mar 12, 2024		50%	38%	—	1%	—	—	6%	5%	4%	504	Online	12%
Insightrix	N/A	Feb 6–8, 2024		47%	49%	—	—	—	—	—	4%	3.5%	800	Online	2%
Angus Reid	N/A	Nov 24 – Dec 1, 2023		52%	39%	—	—	—	3%	—	6%	5%	350	Online	13%
Insightrix	The SKoop	Oct 4–6, 2023		51%	45%	—	—	—	—	—	4%	3.5%	801	Online	6%
Aug 10, 2023			By-elections were held in Regina Coronation Park, Regina Walsh Acres, and Lumsden-Morse.												
July 19, 2023			The Saskatchewan Liberal Party changes their party name to the Saskatchewan Progress Party.												
Insightrix	The SKoop	July 11–14, 2023		45%	36%	2%	2%	10%	2%	3%	1%	3.5%	803	Online	9%
Insightrix	The SKoop	Apr 11–13, 2023		46%	37%	3%	2%	6%	3%	2%	—	3.5%	803	Online	9%
Nov 30, 2022			The Saskatchewan United Party becomes a registered party, and Nadine Wilson becomes the party's first MLA.												
Sep 26, 2022			A by-election was held in Saskatoon Meewasin.												
June 26, 2022			Carla Beck becomes leader of the NDP.												
Angus Reid	N/A	Jun 07–13, 2022		57%	34%	—	1%	—	2%	—	6%	4%	513	Online	23%
Angus Reid	N/A	Mar 10–15, 2022		54%	36%	—	2%	—	2%	—	6%	4%	602	Online	18%
Research Co.	N/A	Feb 19–23, 2022		53%	37%	3%	2%	2%	1%	—	1%	3.5%	808	Online	16%
Feb 18, 2022			Ryan Meili announces his intention to step down as leader of the NDP.												
Feb 15, 2022			A by-election was held in Athabasca.												
Angus Reid	N/A	Jan 7–12, 2022		48%	39%	—	1%	—	2%	—	10%	5%	415	Online	9%
Angus Reid	N/A	Sep 29–Oct 3, 2021		52%	35%	—	1%	—	2%	—	9%	2%	505	Online	17%
Angus Reid	N/A	Jun 2–7, 2021		57%	31%	—	3%	—	2%	—	8%	4%	412	Online	26%
Leger	Common Ground	Mar 1–8, 2021		41.5%	36.3%	4.5%	3.9%	7.3%	6.2%	—	0.2%	N/A	802	Online	5.3%
Angus Reid	N/A	Nov 24–30, 2020		58%	27%	—	3%	—	1%	—	11%	1.4%	459	Online	29%
2020 general election		Oct 26, 2020	—N/a	60.7%	31.8%	2.6%	2.3%	1.9%	0.1%	—	0.2%	—N/a	—N/a	—N/a	28.9%

== Results ==
Although public opinion polling in the latter half of the campaign suggested that the NDP was leading the Saskatchewan Party in popular support, it remained unclear whether this would translate into a majority government, as their lead was based entirely on being ahead in Regina and Saskatoon while remaining ten points or more behind in the province's more rural districts.

Taking nearly all rural ridings and two in Saskatoon (Saskatoon Willowgrove, and Martensville-Blairmore—which includes the Blairmore neighbourhood of Saskatoon), the Saskatchewan Party won enough seats to form its fifth consecutive majority government. If the Saskatchewan Party completes a full four years in office, it will be the second-longest streak of party control in Saskatchewan, exceeded only by the Liberal governments of 1905–1929. The NDP reduced the Saskatchewan Party's majority from eleven seats at dissolution to three, taking all of Regina and all but two ridings in Saskatoon. Only one Saskatoon-based Saskatchewan Party MLA, Ken Cheveldayoff, won re-election.

The NDP achieved upset victories over several long-standing Saskatchewan Party MLAs and ministers, including Bronwyn Eyre, Gene Makowsky, Paul Merriman, Laura Ross, and Christine Tell. The NDP also reclaimed the far northern seat of Athabasca, a party stronghold which the party had unexpectedly lost to the Saskatchewan Party in a 2022 by-election, but did not otherwise make any new gains in the province's rural districts. The Saskatchewan United Party failed to win any seats, and lost its sole seat—held by party founder and former leader Nadine Wilson in the Saskatchewan Rivers riding—to the Saskatchewan Party candidate Eric Schmalz.

Of the 32,476 mail-in ballots requested, only 20,417 had been returned by October 30. The remaining 12,059 must be received by November 7 (two days before the Final Count) in order to be validly entered into the total result. There may yet be judicial recounts: under Saskatchewan law, they may only be requested by a candidate, and only if there is a tie or where the margin of victory is less than the number of rejected ballots and others objected to.

Election to the 30th Saskatchewan Legislature
Party	Leader	Candidates	Votes				Seats		
Party	Leader	Candidates	#	±	%	Change (pp)	2020	2024	±
Saskatchewan	Scott Moe	61	244,037	25,959▼	52.3	−8.82	48	34 / 61	14▼
New Democratic	Carla Beck	61	188,373	47,797▲	40.4	8.58	13	27 / 61	14▲
Saskatchewan United	Jon Hromek	31	18,023	18,023▲	3.9	3.9	*		
Green	Naomi Hunter	58	7,957	2,074▼	1.8	−0.47			
Progressive Conservative	Rose Marie Buscholl	11	4,397	4,007▼	1.0	−0.9			
Buffalo	Phillip Zajac	16	3,267	8,031▼	0.7	−1.86			
Progress	Teunis Peters	3	536	181▲	0.2	0.1			
Independent		2	340	736▼	0.1	−0.14			
Total		243	471,087		100.00%				
Rejected ballots			-	-					
Turnout			471,087	29,351▲	56.77%	3.91▲			
Registered voters			810,816	-					

=== Synopsis of results ===
2024 Saskatchewan general election - synopsis of riding results
Riding (Note: sorted as per results summary)	Winning party								Turnout (Note: including rejected and declined ballots)	Votes								
Riding	2020	1st place	Votes	Share	Margin #	Margin %	2nd place	3rd place	Turnout	Sask	NDP	SUP	Grn	PC	Buff	SPP	Ind	Total
Athabasca	NDP	NDP	1,823	62.80%	788	27.14%	Sask	Green	31.45%	1,035	1,823	–	45	–	–	–	–	2,903
Batoche	Sask	Sask	4,415	61.20%	2,205	30.57%	NDP	SUP	60.27%	4,415	2,210	450	139	–	–	–	–	7,214
Cannington	Sask	Sask	6,157	73.68%	5,034	60.24%	NDP	Buff	60.28%	6,157	1,123	424	103	–	549	–	–	8,356
Canora-Pelly	Sask	Sask	5,227	71.07%	3,476	47.26%	NDP	Buff	57.09%	5,227	1,751	–	154	–	223	–	–	7,355
Carrot River Valley	Sask	Sask	4,857	67.12%	3,462	47.84%	NDP	SUP	54.23%	4,857	1,395	844	140	–	–	–	–	7,236
Cumberland	NDP	NDP	2,289	55.10%	647	15.58%	Sask	Green	29.63%	1,642	2,289	–	173	–	–	–	50	4,154
Cut Knife-Turtleford	Sask	Sask	5,597	71.27%	4,061	51.71%	NDP	SUP	55.66%	5,597	1,536	566	154	–	–	–	–	7,853
Cypress Hills	Sask	Sask	5,807	74.76%	4,341	55.88%	NDP	Buff	57.06%	5,807	1,466	–	–	–	495	–	–	7,768
Dakota-Arm River	New	Sask	5,027	57.45%	2,913	33.29%	NDP	SUP	65.18%	5,027	2,114	1,074	92	443	–	–	–	8,750
Estevan-Big Muddy	New	Sask	5,277	69.97%	4,304	57.07%	NDP	Buff	57.60%	5,277	973	453	84	–	755	–	–	7,542
Humboldt-Watrous	Sask	Sask	5,271	58.66%	3,041	33.85%	NDP	PC	64.25%	5,271	2,230	600	127	660	97	–	–	8,985
Kelvington-Wadena	Sask	Sask	5,015	65.07%	3,279	42.55%	NDP	SUP	60.94%	5,015	1,736	831	125	–	–	–	–	7,707
Kindersley-Biggar	New	Sask	5,749	76.83%	4,526	60.48%	NDP	Ind	56.49%	5,749	1,223	–	115	–	106	–	290	7,483
Last Mountain-Touchwood	Sask	Sask	4,144	53.08%	1,643	21.05%	NDP	SUP	61.36%	4,144	2,501	1,107	–	–	55	–	–	7,807
Lloydminster	Sask	Sask	3,497	77.04%	2,769	61.00%	NDP	SUP	32.64%	3,497	728	276	38	–	–	–	–	4,539
Lumsden-Morse	Sask	Sask	4,774	55.06%	2,617	30.18%	NDP	SUP	65.75%	4,774	2,157	1,371	61	308	–	–	–	8,671
Martensville-Blairmore	New	Sask	4,617	59.93%	1,688	21.91%	NDP	Green	56.21%	4,617	2,929	–	158	–	–	–	–	7,704
Meadow Lake	Sask	Sask	4,102	62.34%	2,035	30.93%	NDP	SUP	49.33%	4,102	2,067	304	107	–	–	–	–	6,580
Melfort	Sask	Sask	5,796	73.90%	4,220	53.81%	NDP	SUP	59.22%	5,796	1,576	379	92	–	–	–	–	7,843
Melville-Saltcoats	Sask	Sask	5,182	65.55%	3,237	40.95%	NDP	SUP	60.41%	5,182	1,945	620	86	–	72	–	–	7,905
Moose Jaw North	Sask	Sask	4,578	59.31%	1,584	20.52%	NDP	Green	60.68%	4,578	2,994	–	147	–	–	–	–	7,719
Moose Jaw Wakamow	Sask	Sask	3,819	55.02%	925	13.33%	NDP	Green	52.71%	3,819	2,894	–	228	–	–	–	–	6,941
Moosomin-Montmartre	Sask	Sask	5,291	66.10%	3,380	42.22%	NDP	SUP	57.75%	5,291	1,911	609	122	–	72	–	–	8,005
Prince Albert Carlton	Sask	Sask	3,166	51.08%	444	7.16%	NDP	SUP	50.84%	3,166	2,722	241	69	–	–	–	–	6,198
Prince Albert Northcote	Sask	Sask	2,892	47.77%	133	2.20%	NDP	SUP	42.53%	2,892	2,759	302	101	–	–	–	–	6,054
Regina Coronation Park	Sask	NDP	3,926	52.73%	1,092	14.67%	Sask	PC	53.54%	2,834	3,926	–	272	414	–	–	–	7,446
Regina Douglas Park	NDP	NDP	4,199	65.55%	2,196	34.28%	Sask	Green	49.56%	2,003	4,199	–	204	–	–	–	–	6,406
Regina Elphinstone-Centre	NDP	NDP	3,268	61.08%	1,851	34.60%	Sask	SUP	38.06%	1,417	3,268	310	156	–	–	199	–	5,350
Regina Lakeview	NDP	NDP	6,260	70.42%	4,048	45.53%	Sask	PC	65.47%	2,212	6,260	–	170	248	–	–	–	8,890
Regina Mount Royal	New	NDP	5,419	61.25%	2,164	24.46%	Sask	Green	62.44%	3,255	5,419	–	174	–	–	–	–	8,848
Regina Northeast	Sask	NDP	3,660	50.73%	507	7.03%	Sask	SPP	59.14%	3,153	3,660	–	149	–	–	253	–	7,215
Regina Pasqua	Sask	NDP	3,814	52.35%	1,005	13.79%	Sask	PC	62.42%	2,809	3,814	–	132	441	90	–	–	7,286
Regina Rochdale	Sask	NDP	5,046	53.44%	816	8.64%	Sask	Green	66.84%	4,230	5,046	–	167	–	–	–	–	9,443
Regina South Albert	New	NDP	5,108	64.73%	2,773	35.14%	Sask	PC	65.90%	2,335	5,108	–	131	317	–	–	–	7,891
Regina University	NDP	NDP	4,081	52.20%	655	8.38%	Sask	PC	66.83%	3,426	4,081	–	78	233	–	–	–	7,818
Regina Walsh Acres	Sask	NDP	4,700	56.99%	1,627	19.73%	Sask	SUP	58.98%	3,073	4,700	352	122	–	–	–	–	8,247
Regina Wascana Plains	Sask	NDP	4,696	48.58%	593	6.13%	Sask	SUP	64.77%	4,103	4,696	414	98	356	–	–	–	9,667
Rosetown-Delisle	New	Sask	5,965	70.74%	3,730	44.24%	NDP	Green	63.58%	5,965	2,235	–	232	–	–	–	–	8,432
Rosthern-Shellbrook	Sask	Sask	5,279	64.18%	3,453	41.98%	NDP	SUP	61.97%	5,279	1,826	1,031	89	–	–	–	–	8,225
Saskatchewan Rivers	Sask	Sask	3,945	53.68%	1,876	25.53%	NDP	SUP	57.31%	3,945	2,069	824	87	424	–	–	–	7,349
Saskatoon Centre	NDP	NDP	3,794	61.24%	1,603	25.88%	Sask	Green	46.95%	2,191	3,794	–	210	–	–	–	–	6,195
Saskatoon Chief Mistawasis	Sask	NDP	4,721	51.49%	559	6.10%	Sask	Green	63.25%	4,162	4,721	–	285	–	–	–	–	9,168
Saskatoon Churchill-Wildwood	Sask	NDP	4,621	57.67%	1,359	16.96%	Sask	Green	64.61%	3,262	4,621	–	130	–	–	–	–	8,013
Saskatoon Eastview	NDP	NDP	5,392	59.42%	2,030	22.37%	Sask	SUP	64.78%	3,362	5,392	196	125	–	–	–	–	9,075
Saskatoon Fairview	NDP	NDP	4,121	56.54%	1,358	18.63%	Sask	Green	52.41%	2,763	4,121	–	244	–	161	–	–	7,289
Saskatoon Meewasin	NDP	NDP	4,617	59.20%	1,677	21.50%	Sask	Green	59.32%	2,940	4,617	–	242	–	–	–	–	7,799
Saskatoon Nutana	NDP	NDP	6,163	74.21%	4,207	50.66%	Sask	Green	61.54%	1,956	6,163	–	186	–	–	–	–	8,305
Saskatoon Riversdale	Sask	NDP	3,624	60.43%	1,506	25.11%	Sask	Green	42.54%	2,118	3,624	–	255	–	–	–	–	5,997
Saskatoon Silverspring	New	NDP	4,435	51.43%	436	5.06%	Sask	Green	62.28%	3,999	4,435	–	190	–	–	–	–	8,624
Saskatoon Southeast	Sask	NDP	4,921	50.53%	429	4.41%	Sask	SUP	65.65%	4,492	4,921	216	109	–	–	–	–	9,738
Saskatoon Stonebridge	New	NDP	4,177	54.30%	841	10.93%	Sask	Green	62.89%	3,336	4,177	–	96	–	–	84	–	7,693
Saskatoon University-Sutherland	New	NDP	3,960	55.92%	1,298	18.33%	Sask	SUP	59.52%	2,662	3,960	312	147	–	–	–	–	7,081
Saskatoon Westview	Sask	NDP	3,576	49.56%	74	1.03%	Sask	Green	56.11%	3,502	3,576	–	138	–	–	–	–	7,216
Saskatoon Willowgrove	Sask	Sask	4,895	49.02%	136	1.36%	NDP	SUP	64.58%	4,895	4,759	251	80	–	–	–	–	9,985
Swift Current	Sask	Sask	4,849	66.42%	2,712	37.15%	NDP	Buff	59.08%	4,849	2,137	–	98	–	216	–	–	7,300
The Battlefords	Sask	Sask	4,352	59.40%	1,633	22.29%	NDP	Green	53.69%	4,352	2,719	–	140	–	115	–	–	7,326
Warman	New	Sask	5,927	65.56%	3,641	40.28%	NDP	SUP	64.16%	5,927	2,286	650	52	–	125	–	–	9,040
Weyburn-Bengough	New	Sask	5,785	66.76%	4,210	48.59%	NDP	SUP	62.33%	5,785	1,575	1,092	119	–	94	–	–	8,665
White City-Qu'appelle	New	Sask	5,298	55.76%	1,705	17.94%	NDP	SUP	65.80%	5,298	3,593	611	–	–	–	–	–	9,502
Wood River	Sask	Sask	5,700	68.26%	4,151	49.71%	NDP	PC	63.26%	5,700	1,549	495	54	553	–	–	–	8,351
Yorkton	Sask	Sask	3,513	51.79%	1,239	18.27%	NDP	SUP	52.74%	3,513	2,274	818	136	–	42	–	–	6,783

= Open seat
= Turnout is above provincial average
= Winning candidate was in previous Legislature
= Incumbent had switched allegiance
= Previously incumbent in another riding
= Not incumbent; was previously elected to the Legislature
= Incumbency arose from byelection gain
= Other incumbents renominated
= Previously an MP in the House of Commons of Canada
= Multiple candidates

=== Comparative analysis for ridings (2024 vs 2020) ===
Ternary plots of election results
2020

2024
Electoral districts won identified by Saskatchewan Party (green) and NDP (orange).

=== Summary analysis ===
Candidates ranked 1st to 5th place, by party
Parties	1st	2nd	3rd	4th	5th
█ Saskatchewan	34	27			
█ New Democratic	27	34			
█ Saskatchewan United			27	4	
█ Green			20	28	10
█ Progressive Conservative			7	4	
█ Buffalo			5	4	6
█ Progress			1	2	
█ Independent			1	1	
