= Nadine Wilson =

Canadian politician

The Honourable Nadine Wilson ECS
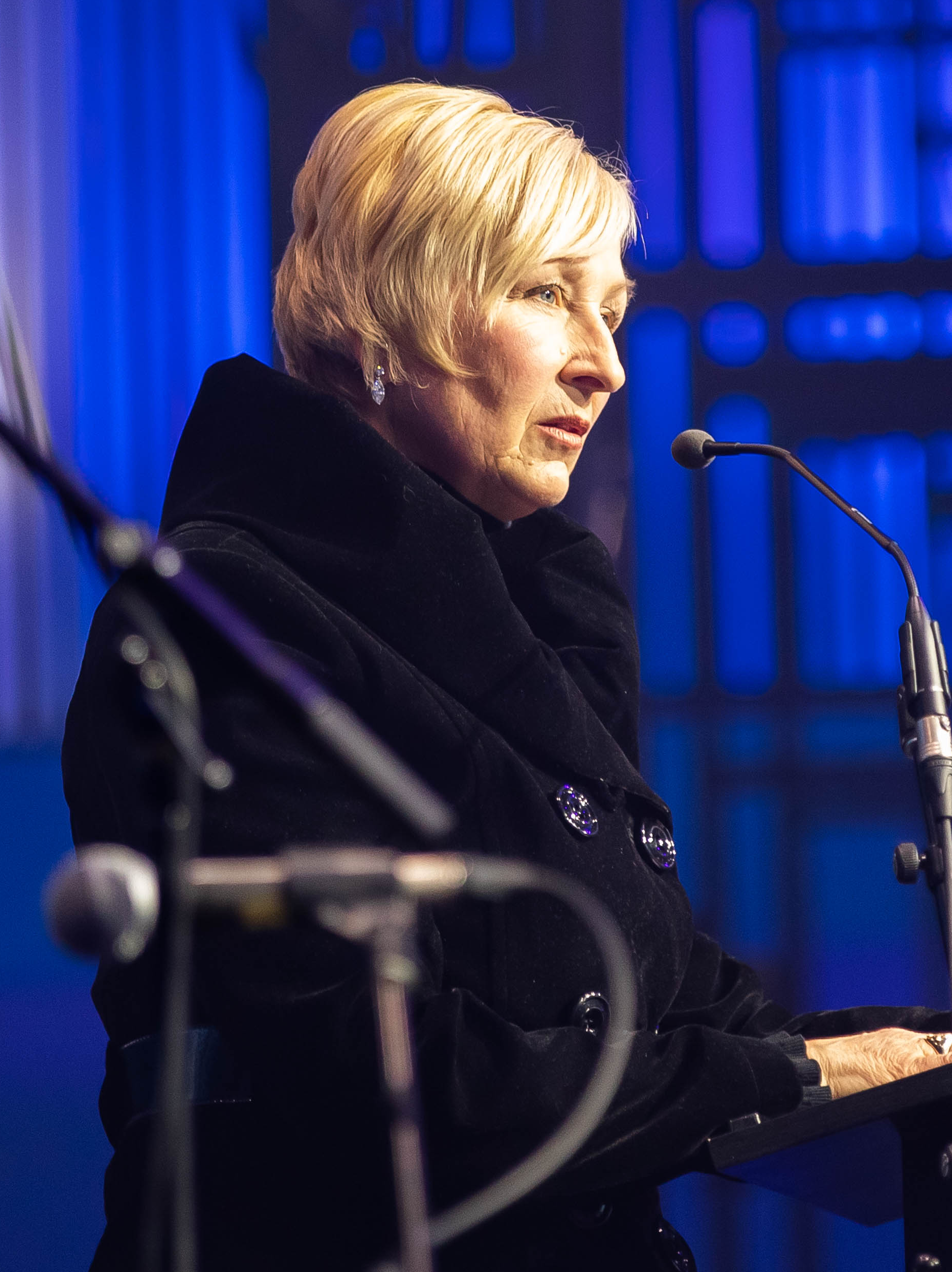

Leader of the Saskatchewan United Party
- In office November 30, 2022 – May 16, 2024
- Preceded by: None (inaugural leader)
- Succeeded by: Jon Hromek

Member of the Saskatchewan Legislative Assembly for Saskatchewan Rivers
- In office November 7, 2007 – October 1, 2024
- Preceded by: Lon Borgerson
- Succeeded by: Eric Schmalz

Personal details
- Party: Saskatchewan United (2022–present)
- Other political affiliations: Independent (2021–2022); Saskatchewan Party (until 2021)

Nadine Wilson is a Canadian politician who served as the member of the Legislative Assembly of Saskatchewan (MLA) for Saskatchewan Rivers from 2007 to 2024. From 2022 to 2024, she served as the first leader of the Saskatchewan United Party. Wilson was formerly a Saskatchewan Party MLA who served as the Provincial Secretary in the governments of Brad Wall and Scott Moe.

== Political career ==
=== Saskatchewan Party MLA ===
Before entering provincial politics, Wilson was twice elected Reeve of the Rural Municipality of Paddockwood. Wilson was first elected to represent the electoral district of Saskatchewan Rivers in the Legislative Assembly of Saskatchewan in the 2007 election, defeating incumbent New Democratic Party and cabinet member Lon Borgerson. Wilson was re-elected in the 2011, 2016, and 2020 provincial elections.

In 2009, Premier Brad Wall appointed Wilson as Legislative Secretary to the Minister responsible for Immigration - New Citizen Initiative. After the 2011 provincial election, Wilson was appointed Chair of the Standing Committee on Private Bills and the Private Bills House Committee, as well as Deputy Caucus Chair. In a June 2014 cabinet shuffle, Wilson was appointed Provincial Secretary and Legislative Secretary to the Premier.

In 2019, Wilson was charged with two counts of common assault after a conflict with her step-mother and step-brother about care for her father, who died later that year. Wilson reportedly forced her way into an apartment during the conflict. The case was referred to mediation, and at the conclusion of that process the assault charges were withdrawn. Wilson resigned from her position as Provincial Secretary in the cabinet, but remained in the Saskatchewan Party caucus throughout the process.

Wilson let her name stand to become the new Speaker of the Legislative Assembly in 2020, but Randy Weekes was chosen instead; Wilson ultimately served as Deputy Speaker. Wilson also served as Saskatchewan-Ukraine Relations Liaison.

==== Resignation and Independent MLA ====
On September 30, 2021, Wilson resigned from the Saskatchewan Party caucus. Premier Scott Moe explained that the resignation was due to Wilson lying about her COVID-19 vaccination status. Wilson, who had become a vocal critic of the government's handling of the COVID-19 pandemic, arguing against public health measures—including proof-of-vaccination policies—asserted that she was not told to resign and that the decision was due to her having lost confidence in the government. Wilson claimed that she never confirmed that she had been vaccinated, despite wearing a sticker stating as much in the Legislature.

After resigning from the Saskatchewan Party caucus, Wilson sat as an independent member. Wilson remained focused on pandemic-related public health measures, and in late October 2023 spoke at a rally outside the Legislature Building, offering support to people protesting against such measures. Wilson accused other members of the government of bullying her, and was suspended from the Legislative chamber in May 2022 after refusing to apologize for accusing Minister of Trade and Export Jeremy Harrison of breaking the law and lying, which she later clarified was in regards to the government's public health measures. That spring, Moe pressured Wilson to resign her seat and allow a by-election in Saskatchewan Rivers.

=== Saskatchewan United Party ===
In the spring of 2022, Wilson was part of an effort, alongside former Conservative Member of Parliament and federal agriculture minister Gerry Ritz, to establish a new conservative provincial party. Early efforts reportedly involved an attempted "takeover" of the provincial Progressive Conservative party, with a plan to rebrand as the Conservative Party with Wilson as leader. When that effort failed, focus shifted to starting a new party, with organizers publicly noting an opposition to pandemic-related public health measures. On November 30, 2022, the Saskatchewan United Party (SUP) was registered with Elections Saskatchewan, with Wilson appointed party leader and becoming its first member in the Legislature. Wilson stated that her priority was securing an inquiry into the government's handling of the COVID-19 pandemic in Saskatchewan; she also invited guests to the assembly who claimed to have experienced "vaccine injuries", and asked the government questions about vaccine safety. Wilson was again met with calls to resign and trigger a by-election for her seat.

On February 28, 2023, Wilson and the SUP held an official launch event in Saskatoon, branding itself as the "conservative option for Saskatchewan".

The SUP ran its first candidate in a by-election on August 10; Jon Hromek finished second to the Saskatchewan Party's Blaine McLeod in the Lumsden-Morse contest, claiming 23% of the votes. Wilson stated that she was "very pleased" with the result, and attributed it to the party advocating for more parental involvement in the education system. Later that month, the Saskatchewan Party government introduced new education policies restricting sexual health education and requiring parental consent for children under 16 wishing to have their chosen names and pronouns affirmed at school; the government went on to introduce legislation titled the "Parents' Bill of Rights". Wilson supported the legislation and took credit for forcing the government to introduce it, and also for its willingness to invoke the notwithstanding clause to turn it into law after a court injunction against the policy was granted in September. On October 20, 2023, Wilson voted with the Saskatchewan Party to pass the bill.

On May 16, 2024, it was announced that Wilson had stepped down as leader of the SUP, and that Jon Hromek had been appointed as the new leader; Wilson stated that she still intended to run for the SUP in the 2024 provincial election. Wilson went on to lose the re-election bid in Saskatchewan Rivers, with Saskatchewan Party candidate Eric Schmalz winning the riding.

== Personal life ==
Before entering politics, Wilson studied social service work and was one of the first women working as a corrections worker in the Men's Provincial Correctional Centre in Prince Albert, Saskatchewan. Wilson was also a Saskatchewan 4-H club leader.

Wilson and her husband, Doug, reside north of Prince Albert. They have four children and ten grandchildren.

== Electoral record ==
2020 Saskatchewan general election: Saskatchewan Rivers
Party	Candidate	Votes	%
Saskatchewan	Nadine Wilson	4,401	62.22
New Democratic	Lyle Whitefish	1,839	26.00
Progressive Conservative	Shaun Harris	424	6.00
Buffalo	Fred Lackie	292	4.13
Green	Marcia Neault	117	1.65
Total		7,073	98.94
Source: Elections Saskatchewan

2016 Saskatchewan general election: Saskatchewan Rivers
Party	Candidate	Votes	%
Saskatchewan	Nadine Wilson	4,584	67.03
New Democratic	Lyle Whitefish	2,010	29.39
Liberal	Brenda McKnight	244	3.56
Total		6,838	100.0
Source: Elections Saskatchewan

2011 Saskatchewan general election: Saskatchewan Rivers
Party	Candidate	Votes	%
Saskatchewan	Nadine Wilson	4,749	65.92
New Democratic	Jeanette Wicinski-Dunn	2,247	31.19
Green	Paul-Emile L'Heureux	208	2.89
Total		7,204	100
Source: Elections Saskatchewan

2007 Saskatchewan general election: Saskatchewan Rivers
Party	Candidate	Votes	%
Saskatchewan	Nadine Wilson	4,294	54.92
New Democratic	Lon Borgerson	3,221	41.19
Liberal	Alyssa Fullerton	304	3.89
Total		7,819	100
Source: Elections Saskatchewan

== Cabinet Positions ==
Saskatchewan provincial government of Scott Moe
Cabinet post (1)
Predecessor	Office	Successor
con'd from Wall Ministry	Provincial Secretary of Saskatchewan; February 2, 2018–July 29, 2019	Todd Goudy
Saskatchewan provincial government of Brad Wall
Cabinet post (1)
Predecessor	Office	Successor
Wayne Elhard	Provincial Secretary of Saskatchewan; August 23, 2016–February 2, 2018	con'd into Moe Ministry
