= Jon Hromek =

Canadian politician

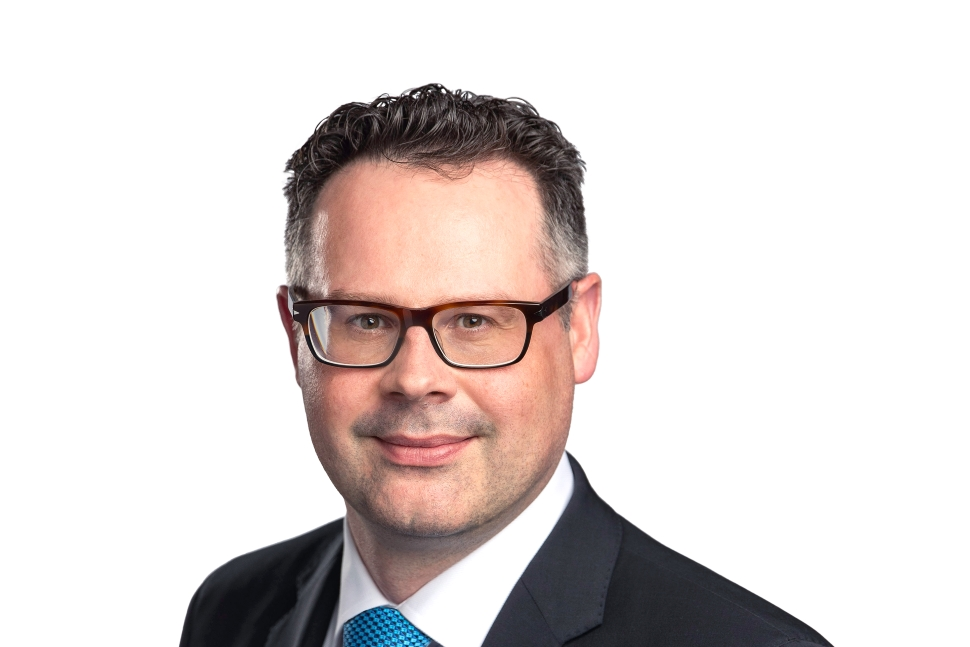
- Jon Hromek

Leader of the Saskatchewan United Party
- In office May 16, 2024 – December 30, 2024
- Preceded by: Nadine Wilson
- Succeeded by: Doug Forster

Deputy Leader of the Saskatchewan United Party
- In office October 3, 2023 – May 16, 2024

Personal details
- Party: Saskatchewan United Party
- Education: University of Regina
- Occupation: Business owner
- Profession: Petroleum engineering

Jonathan Hromek is a Canadian politician. Hromek was the leader of the Saskatchewan United Party from May to December 2024, leading the party in the 2024 Saskatchewan general election. Hromek was also the party's first election candidate when he ran in the 2023 Lumsden-Morse provincial by-election.

== Political career ==
Hromek launched his political career in the summer of 2023, when he became the first candidate to run for the Saskatchewan United Party (SUP), in the August Lumsden-Morse by-election. Running on a platform focused on "parental rights" in education, Hromek finished second to the Saskatchewan Party's Blaine McLeod with 23% of the vote, earning 35 more votes than the third place New Democratic Party candidate. Hromek spoke positively of the result and suggested that the party would fare better in a full general election campaign.

In 2023, Hromek contributed $200,000 to SUP through his company, Adonai Resources, representing roughly 40% of the total contributions for the party that year. When asked about the large contribution, Hromek stated that he was "a firm believer that you put your money where your mouth is and that’s why I did that." On October 3, 2023, Hromek was named the deputy leader of SUP.

=== SUP leader ===
On May 16, 2024, it was announced that party founder Nadine Wilson was stepping down as leader, and that Hromek had been appointed as the new SUP leader.

In October, Hromek launched SUP's campaign ahead of the 2024 provincial election. He stated that the party hoped to elect at least two members to the Legislative Assembly. Hromek pitched SUP as "a true conservative option" for the province, stating that the party would pursue increased privatization in the healthcare system, reintroduce standardized testing in the education system while placing greater limitations on sexual health education, and cut sales taxes and eliminate the provincial gas tax. To raise revenues, Hromek promised increased potash royalty rates. Hromek also stated that the party was committed to removing "ideology" from schools, including "genders" and discussion of the climate crisis. While Hromek conceded that humans were responsible for climate change "to a certain extent," he falsely claimed that carbon dioxide had been 'demonized' as a 'pollutant'.

SUP ultimately failed to have any candidates elected in the 2024 election; Wilson and Hromek finished third in their respective races, and the party finished a distant third overall, receiving nearly four percent of the popular vote. Hromek stated that SUP "can hold our head high and be proud of ourselves with what we accomplished", taking credit for pressuring the Saskatchewan Party to move further right in its policies, including a late campaign promise for a bathroom bill.

On December 30, 2024, Hromek announced that he was resigning as SUP leader. In January 2025, he expressed interest in running for the leadership of the Saskatchewan Party, stating that he had "always been a Sask. Party guy" but felt the party had drifted away from its base. Hromek stated that for him, the 2024 election made clear that political change could most easily be achieved through the Saskatchewan Party, and that there was an opportunity to take the party "back to its original roots". Noting that the party's 2025 annual general meeting would include a leadership review, Hromek encouraged SUP supporters to acquire Saskatchewan Party memberships to help force a leadership race, in which he would "absolutely" consider running in.

== Personal life ==
Hromek trained as a Petroleum engineer, graduating with a Bachelors of Applied Sciences in Petroleum Engineering from the University of Regina in 2003. He is the CEO and chairman of Adonai Resources II Corporation, an oil and gas exploration and production company. He is a member of both the Association of Professional Engineers and Geoscientists of Saskatchewan and the Saskatchewan Headquartered Oil Producers.

Hromek is married with four children, and lives in the Lumsden area.

== Electoral record ==
2024 Saskatchewan general election: Lumsden-Morse
Party	Candidate	Votes	%
Saskatchewan	Blaine McLeod	4,774	55.06
New Democratic	Chauntel Baudu	2,157	24.88
Saskatchewan United	Jon Hromek	1,371	15.81
Progressive Conservative	Megan Torrie	308	3.55
Green	Isaiah Hunter	61	0.70
Total		8,671	100.0
Source: Elections Saskatchewan

Saskatchewan provincial by-election, 10 August 2023: Lumsden-Morse (Resignation of Lyle Stewart)
Party	Candidate	Votes	%
Saskatchewan	Blaine McLeod	2,696	53.42
Saskatchewan United	Jon Hromek	1,145	22.69
New Democratic	Kaitlyn Stadnyk	1,110	21.99
Buffalo	Les Guillemin	56	1.11
Green	Isaiah Hunter	40	0.79
Total valid votes		5,047	100.00
Source: Elections Saskatchewan
