= Saskatoon University-Sutherland =

Saskatchewan electoral district

Provincial electoral district
- Legislature: Legislative Assembly of Saskatchewan
MLA
Tajinder Grewal
New Democratic
- District created: 2022
- First contested: 2024

Demographics
- Census division: Division No. 11
- Census subdivision: Saskatoon

Saskatoon University-Sutherland is a provincial electoral district for the Legislative Assembly of Saskatchewan, Canada.

The riding was created by redistribution in 2022, and was created from combining most of Saskatoon University with part of Saskatoon Silverspring-Sutherland. It was first contested in the 2024 Saskatchewan general election.

== Election results ==
2024 Saskatchewan general election
Party	Candidate	Votes	%	±%
New Democratic	Tajinder Grewal	3,960	55.92	+5.92
Saskatchewan	Ghislaine McLeod	2,662	37.59	-10.41
Saskatchewan United	Dawne Badrock	312	4.41	–
Green	Felipe Guerra	147	2.08	+0.08
Total valid votes		7,081	98.88	
Total rejected ballots		80	1.12	
Turnout		7,161	59.52	
Eligible voters		12,032		
Source: Elections Saskatchewan

2020 provincial election redistributed results
Party	%
New Democratic	50.0
Saskatchewan	48.0
Green	2.0
