= 29th Saskatchewan Legislature =

29th elected Legislature of the Canadian province of Saskatchewan

- Majority parliament
- November 30, 2020 – October 1, 2024

Parliament leaders
- Premier: Scott Moe; February 2, 2018 – present
- Leader of the Opposition: Ryan Meili; March 3, 2018 – June 26, 2022
- Carla Beck; June 26, 2022 – present

Party caucuses
- Government: Saskatchewan Party
- Opposition: New Democratic Party

Legislative Assembly
- Seating arrangements of the Legislative Assembly
- Speaker of the Assembly: Randy Weekes; November 30, 2020 – November 25, 2024
- Government House Leader: Jeremy Harrison; August 13, 2019 – May 24, 2024
- Opposition House Leader: Vicki Mowat; November 4, 2020 – October 5, 2022
- Nicole Sarauer; October 5, 2022 – present
- Members: 61 MLA seats

Sovereign
- Monarch: Elizabeth II; 6 February 1952 – 8 September 2022
- Charles III; 8 September 2022 – present
- Lieutenant Governor: Russell Mirasty; July 18, 2019 – January 31, 2025

Sessions
- 1st session 2020 – 2021
- 2nd session 2021 – 2022
- 3rd session 2022 – 2023
- 4th session 2023 – 2024
← 28th	→ 30th

The 29th Saskatchewan Legislature was elected at the 2020 Saskatchewan general election.

Notably, this is the first Saskatchewan Legislature in which some government members will sit on the Speaker's left. The Saskatchewan Legislature chamber is among the most spacious of all Westminster parliaments relative to its number of members, meaning that the entire government caucus is usually able to sit on the Speaker's right regardless of the size of its majority. However, due to the COVID-19 pandemic, desks have been spaced out as much as possible to satisfy physical distancing requirements, an arrangement which made it necessary to place a relatively equal number of desks on both sides of the aisle.

== Members ==
Name	Party	Riding	First elected / previously elected	No.# of term(s)	Notes
**Dana Skoropad**	SK Party	Arm River	2020	1st term	
Buckley Belanger	NDP	Athabasca	1995 (Note: First elected as a Liberal)	7th term	Resigned August 15, 2021
Jim Lemaigre	SK Party	Athabasca	2022	1st term	Elected February 15, 2022
Delbert Kirsch	SK Party	Batoche	2003	5th term	
Randy Weekes^{†}	SK Party	Biggar-Sask Valley	1999	6th term	Elected as member of Saskatchewan Party
Randy Weekes^{†}	Independent	Biggar-Sask Valley	1999	6th term	Elected as member of Saskatchewan Party
Daryl Harrison	SK Party	Cannington	2020	1st term	
Terry Dennis	SK Party	Canora-Pelly	2016	2nd term	
Fred Bradshaw	SK Party	Carrot River Valley	2007	4th term	
Doyle Vermette	NDP	Cumberland	2008	4th term	
Ryan Domotor	SK Party	Cut Knife-Turtleford	2020	1st term	Elected as member of Saskatchewan Party
Ryan Domotor	Independent	Cut Knife-Turtleford	2020	1st term	Elected as member of Saskatchewan Party
Doug Steele	SK Party	Cypress Hills	2016	2nd term	
**Lori Carr**	SK Party	Estevan	2016	2nd term	
**Donna Harpauer**	SK Party	Humboldt-Watrous	1999	6th term	
Don McMorris	SK Party	Indian Head-Milestone	1999	6th term	
Hugh Nerlien	SK Party	Kelvington-Wadena	2016	2nd term	
Ken Francis	SK Party	Kindersley	2018	2nd term	
Travis Keisig	SK Party	Last Mountain-Touchwood	2020	1st term	
Colleen Young	SK Party	Lloydminster	2014	3rd term	
Lyle Stewart	SK Party	Lumsden-Morse	1999	6th term	Resigned March 10, 2023
Blaine McLeod	SK Party	Lumsden-Morse	2023	1st term	Elected August 10, 2023
Terry Jenson	SK Party	Martensville-Warman	2020	1st term	
Jeremy Harrison	SK Party	Meadow Lake	2007	4th term	
Todd Goudy	SK Party	Melfort	2018	2nd term	
Warren Kaeding	SK Party	Melville-Saltcoats	2016	2nd term	
Tim McLeod	SK Party	Moose Jaw North	2020	1st term	
Greg Lawrence	SK Party	Moose Jaw Wakamow	2011	3rd term	Elected as member of Saskatchewan Party
Greg Lawrence	Independent	Moose Jaw Wakamow	2011	3rd term	Elected as member of Saskatchewan Party
Steven Bonk	SK Party	Moosomin	2016	2nd term	
Joe Hargrave	SK Party	Prince Albert Carlton	2016	2nd term	
Alana Ross	SK Party	Prince Albert Northcote	2020	1st term	
Mark Docherty	SK Party	Regina Coronation Park	2011	3rd term	Resigned February 10, 2023
Noor Burki	NDP	Regina Coronation Park	2023	1st term	Elected August 10, 2023
Nicole Sarauer	NDP	Regina Douglas Park	2016	2nd term	
Meara Conway	NDP	Regina Elphinstone-Centre	2020	1st term	
Gene Makowsky	SK Party	Regina Gardiner Park	2011	3rd term	
Carla Beck	NDP	Regina Lakeview	2016	2nd term	
Gary Grewal	SK Party	Regina Northeast	2020	1st term	
Muhammad Fiaz	SK Party	Regina Pasqua	2016	2nd term	
**Laura Ross**	SK Party	Regina Rochdale	2007	4th term	
Trent Wotherspoon	NDP	Regina Rosemont	2007	4th term	
Aleana Young	NDP	Regina University	2020	1st term	
Derek Meyers	SK Party	Regina Walsh Acres	2020	1st term	Died March 28, 2023
Jared Clarke	NDP	Regina Walsh Acres	2023	1st term	Elected August 10, 2023
**Christine Tell**	SK Party	Regina Wascana Plains	2007	4th term	
**Jim Reiter**	SK Party	Rosetown-Elrose	2007	4th term	
**Scott Moe**	SK Party	Rosthern-Shellbrook	2011	3rd term	
Nadine Wilson	SK Party	Saskatchewan Rivers	2007	4th term	Elected as member of Saskatchewan Party
Nadine Wilson	Sask United	Saskatchewan Rivers	2007	4th term	Elected as member of Saskatchewan Party
Betty Nippi-Albright	NDP	Saskatoon Centre	2020	1st term	
Lisa Lambert	SK Party	Saskatoon Churchill-Wildwood	2016	2nd term	
Matt Love	NDP	Saskatoon Eastview	2020	1st term	
Vicki Mowat	NDP	Saskatoon Fairview	2017	2nd term	
Ryan Meili	NDP	Saskatoon Meewasin	2017	2nd term	Resigned June 26, 2022
Nathaniel Teed	NDP	Saskatoon Meewasin	2022	1st term	Elected September 26, 2022
**Gordon Wyant**	SK Party	Saskatoon Northwest	2010	4th term	Resigned June 10, 2024
Erika Ritchie	NDP	Saskatoon Nutana	2020	1st term	
Marv Friesen	SK Party	Saskatoon Riversdale	2020	1st term	
Paul Merriman	SK Party	Saskatoon Silverspring-Sutherland	2011	3rd term	
**Don Morgan**	SK Party	Saskatoon Southeast	2003	5th term	
Bronwyn Eyre	SK Party	Saskatoon Stonebridge-Dakota	2016	2nd term	
Jennifer Bowes	NDP	Saskatoon University	2020	1st term	
David Buckingham	SK Party	Saskatoon Westview	2016	2nd term	
Ken Cheveldayoff	SK Party	Saskatoon Willowgrove	2003	5th term	
**Everett Hindley**	SK Party	Swift Current	2018	2nd term	
**Jeremy Cockrill**	SK Party	The Battlefords	2020	1st term	
**Dustin Duncan**	SK Party	Weyburn-Big Muddy	2006	5th term	
**Dave Marit**	SK Party	Wood River	2016	2nd term	
Greg Ottenbreit	SK Party	Yorkton	2007	4th term	

- Member in **bold italic** is the Premier of Saskatchewan.
- Members in **bold** are in the Cabinet of Saskatchewan.
- Members in italic are Leaders of the respective parties.
- Member with ^{†} denotes the Speaker of the Assembly.
- Members with ‡ are Legislative Secretaries to Cabinet Ministers.
