= Martensville-Blairmore =

Saskatchewan electoral district

Provincial electoral district
- Legislature: Legislative Assembly of Saskatchewan
MLA
Jamie Martens
Saskatchewan
- District created: 2022
- First contested: 2024

Demographics
- Census division: Division No. 11
- Census subdivision(s): Corman Park No. 344, Dalmeny, Martensville, Saskatoon

Martensville-Blairmore is a provincial electoral district for the Legislative Assembly of Saskatchewan, Canada.

The riding was created by redistribution in 2022, taking territory from Martensville-Warman, Saskatoon Fairview and Biggar-Sask Valley. It will be first contested in the 30th Saskatchewan general election. It is named after the city of Martensville, which includes most of the riding's population. The riding also includes the Blairmore neighbourhood of Saskatoon, the town of Dalmeny, and adjacent rural area.

== Election results ==
2024 Saskatchewan general election
Party	Candidate	Votes	%	±%
Saskatchewan	Jamie Martens	4,617	59.93	-6.87
New Democratic	Tammy Pike	2,929	38.02	+13.22
Green	Brittney Ricottone	158	2.05	-0.15
Total valid votes		7,704	99.16	
Total rejected ballots		65	0.84	
Turnout		7,769	56.21	
Eligible voters		13,822		
Saskatchewan hold		Swing		
Source: Elections Saskatchewan

2020 provincial election redistributed results
Party	%
Saskatchewan	66.8
New Democratic	24.8
Buffalo	5.6
Green	2.2
Progressive Conservative	0.6
