= Saskatoon Meewasin provincial by-election =

Saskatoon Meewasin provincial by-election may refer to:

- 2017 Saskatoon Meewasin provincial by-election
- 2022 Saskatoon Meewasin provincial by-election
