= Parents' Bill of Rights (Saskatchewan) =

Education Amendment Act, 2023

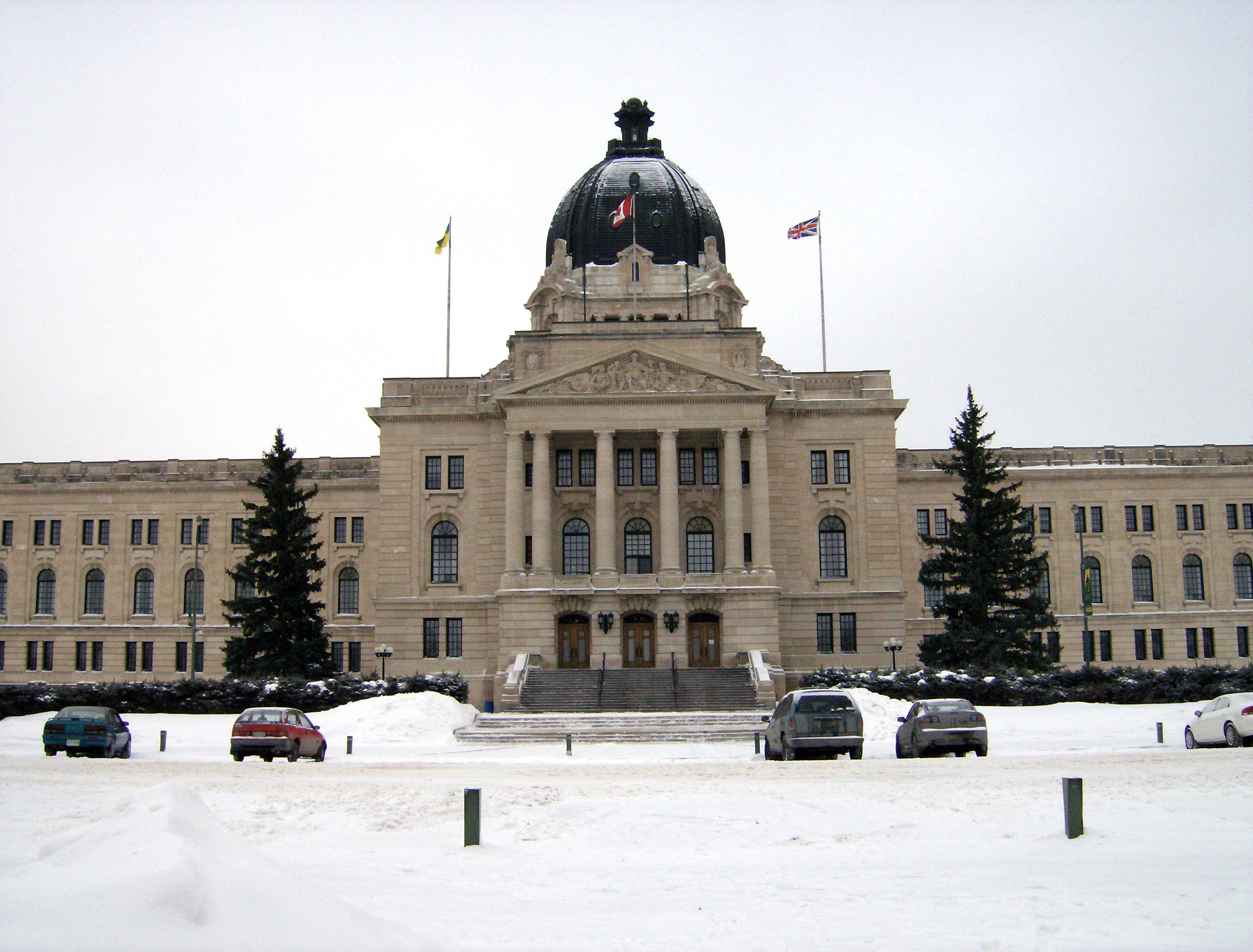

Legislative Assembly of Saskatchewan
- Long title: An Act to amend The Education Act, 1995 respecting parental rights
- Citation: S.S. 2023, c. 46
- Assented to: October 20, 2023

Legislative history
- Bill citation: Bill 137
- Introduced by: Jeremy Cockrill MLA, Education Minister
- Introduced: October 10, 2023
- First reading: October 12, 2023
- Second reading: October 19, 2023
- Third reading: October 20, 2023
- Status: In force

The Education (Parents' Bill of Rights) Amendment Act, 2023, commonly known as the Parents' Bill of Rights, is a 2023 piece of legislation amending the Saskatchewan Education Act. Also known as Bill 137, the legislation was introduced on October 10 during an emergency session of the 29th Saskatchewan Legislature, and it was passed on October 20 after a week of intensive debate in the Legislative Assembly. The provincial government, led by Premier Scott Moe, invoked the notwithstanding clause—Section 33 of the Canadian Charter of Rights and Freedoms—to pass the legislation and protect it from legal challenges based on Charter Rights.

Bill 137 requires parental notification and consent when students under the age of 16 wish to change their preferred names, nicknames or pronouns that could be related to gender expression while at school. In addition, the bill places restrictions on sexual health education, making provisions for parental consent and prohibiting outside party involvement in the teaching of sexual health education. In addition it requires teachers to not answer potentially controversial questions asked by students and to instead advise them to speak to their family. The bill, and the process used to pass it, drew criticism from legal and human rights experts. It also proved divisive among residents of the province, drawing large crowds at protests since the policies were first proposed in the summer of 2023. The bill was cited as an example of the encroachment of American "culture wars" into Canadian politics.

== Background ==
=== Introduction of new policies ===
The impetus for Bill 137 arose out of controversy surrounding new educational policies introduced in August 2023, only weeks before the start of the school year, by Minister of Education Dustin Duncan. On August 22, Duncan announced new policies that would require parental consent for students under 16 wishing to have their chosen names and pronouns affirmed at school; in addition, new policies would place restrictions on sexual health education, making it easier for parents to opt their children out of sexual health education and banning third parties, including experts in sexual assault, from participating in such education.

These policies were introduced less than two weeks after three provincial by-elections. While the governing Saskatchewan Party won the Lumsden-Morse by-election, the Saskatchewan United Party (SUP) finished second with nearly a quarter of the vote. SUP leader Nadine Wilson attributed the strong performance to her party's advocacy for more parental involvement in the education system. Moe stated afterwards that it was "up to our government to listen to and act on that message that has been sent here this week." Subsequently, the SUP was widely cited as an impetus for the new policies, and the party took credit for the policies on social media. At the same time, a national Christian lobbying group called "Action4Canada" took credit for influencing the Saskatchewan Party government towards the policy. The group claimed to have sent over 10,000 messages to Moe and Duncan and to have had an in-person meeting with Duncan's staff in April 2023.

In September, it was reported that the Ministry of Education took only nine days to create the policy, and did so without consulting students, school boards, the Saskatchewan Teachers' Federation, the province's youth advocate, or other experts. The government reported that it had received eighteen letters—seven of them from self-identified parents—in the spring and summer about the development of a similar policy in New Brunswick. Moe countered that while the directive to create the policy was made on August 9, the caucus had in fact been discussing the development of such a policy for months. However, emails obtained through a freedom of information request revealed that provincial employees were instructed on August 10 to conduct a "rush jurisdictional scan" of educational policies across Canada and the United States. Moe also stated that in his government's view, "the leading experts in children's upbringing are their parents". However, it was reported in October that the government had relied on the work of a single American clinical psychologist in developing the policy.

The day the new policies were announced, the Saskatchewan Advocate for Children and Youth, Lisa Broda, announced that the advocate's office would be reviewing the policy; Broda further stated that she was "deeply troubled by the impact this policy will have on the rights of children in Saskatchewan". The advocate's office released its findings on September 15, warning that the policy risked violating "a young person's rights under provincial, constitutional, and international human rights law" and that it could result in harm to vulnerable students. The Advocate recommended extensive revisions to the policy and warned that it risked placing further pressure on existing supports in schools. At the same time, there were repeated calls to pause and revise the policies, including from the Saskatchewan School Boards Association. Experts pointed to research concluding that the practice of social affirmation—including the use of preferred pronouns—leads to healthier outcomes for gender-diverse youth, while the absence of social affirmation had been linked to increased harm. Experts also criticized the potential negative health consequences of scaling back sexual health education.

=== Court challenge and injunction ===
On September 1, 2023, the UR Pride Centre for Sexuality and Gender Diversity at the University of Regina and Egale Canada—a national LGBTQ advocacy organization—filed a lawsuit against the Saskatchewan government over the policies. The group held their first meeting with the chief justice in Regina on September 5, and the first hearing was set for September 19. Specifically, UR Pride and Egale argued that the policies violate sections 7 and 15 of the Charter of Rights and Freedoms, those pertaining to the right to liberty, security of the person, and equality rights. The policies took effect with the start of the school year in early September, and before the first hearing occurred, Premier Moe mused openly about enshrining the policies in law and invoking the notwithstanding clause to protect them against further Charter challenges.

On September 28, Court of King's Bench Justice Michael Megaw granted an injunction against the policies, writing that the policies risked causing "irreparable harm" to vulnerable students and that "the protection of these youth surpasses that interest expressed by the Government, pending a full and complete hearing into the constitutionality of this Policy". Moe characterized the injunction as "judicial overreach". That characterization drew criticism from legal experts, and the Saskatchewan Trial Lawyers' Association released a statement expressing concern that Moe's statement was "premature" and had the "potential to erode public trust" in the judiciary; as such, the STLA urged the government "to respect the role of the judiciary and to allow the court to perform its constitutional role of judicial review".

== Legislative history ==
On September 28, the day an injunction was granted against the parental consent policy, Premier Moe stated his intent to enshrine the policy in law and to invoke the notwithstanding clause to protect it from further Charter challenges.

Moe instructed the lieutenant governor to recall the legislature early for an emergency debate on the legislation—the first such occurrence in a quarter of a century. The emergency session began on October 10, with debate set to last for 40 hours. The Opposition New Democratic Party (NDP) used most of the debate time; NDP members spent the time reading into the record collected accounts of people who would be affected by the law, highlighting the court injunction granted against the initial policy, and questioning the government's process. NDP education critic Matt Love also proposed two amendments to the bill: a "do no harm" clause that would void the consent requirement in cases where a mental health professional determined that there was no safe way to involve a parent, and a provision to enact a parental engagement strategy; both amendments were defeated by the government.

At the conclusion of 40 hours of debate on October 20, the Parents' Bill of Rights passed on a 40–12 vote, with all present NDP members voting against and the lone Saskatchewan United Party member voting in favour alongside the governing Saskatchewan Party; while long-time Saskatchewan Party cabinet ministers Don Morgan and Gordon Wyant were absent for the vote, Premier Moe stated that he was "100 per cent" confident that they supported the bill. After the vote, the bill was signed into law by Lieutenant Governor Russ Mirasty.

On October 24, the provincial government's legal representative in the case brought against it by UR Pride and Egale Canada instructed the court that with the passage of the law, the government had rescinded the policy that was the subject of the case; the government expected this to end the case. The following day, Moe stated that he was "not sure how a court case would continue with no policy." However, the applicants stated an intent to amend the case, and on December 1, they submitted an amended application focusing the case on the Parents' Bill of Rights.

In response to questions, Premier Moe stated on November 14 that it was up to school divisions to enforce the policies in the law, and that as such he did not know what consequences there might be for teachers that decide not to follow the law.

== Contents ==
=== Parental consent ===
The Parents' Bill of Rights stipulates that a parent has a right to be the primary decision-maker with respect to their child's education, including the right to withdraw their child from sexual health education and the right to withhold consent for the use of gender-related names or pronouns if the child is under 16 years of age. The bill also stipulates that if it can be reasonably expected that obtaining parental consent could result in harm to the student, that the school will direct the students to "appropriate professionals" within the school to get help devising a plan to inform their parents. Further, the bill stipulates that no legal action can be brought against the government for harm resulting from the enactment of the law.

=== Other provisions ===
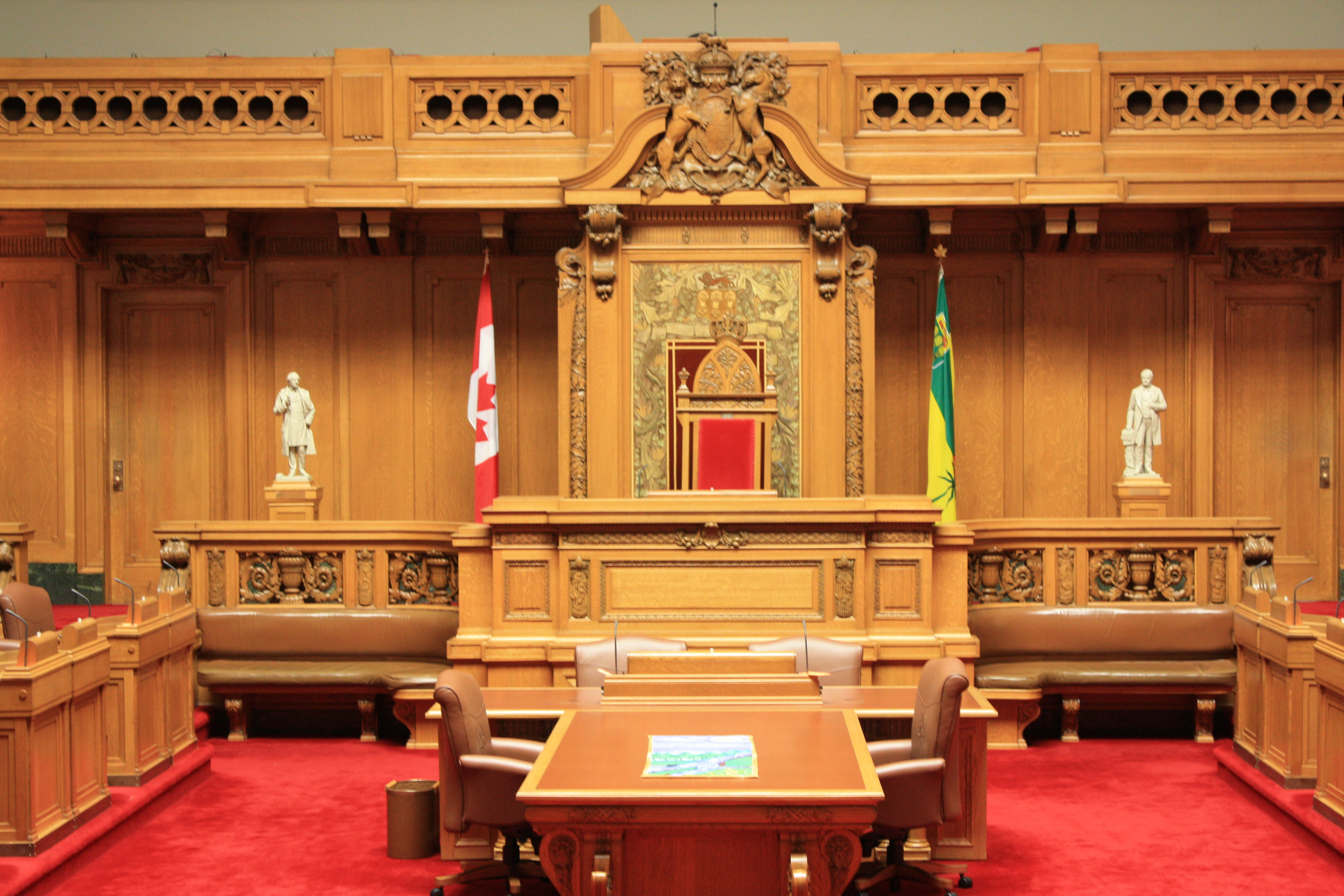
The flags of Canada and Saskatchewan inside the Legislative Chamber. Bill 137 makes it mandatory for schools in the province to fly both flags.

The Parents' Bill of Rights also includes an amendment making it mandatory for schools in the province to fly the flag of Saskatchewan alongside the flag of Canada.

=== Impetus and rationale ===
Premier Moe and ministers Duncan and Jeremy Cockrill persistently stated that the new policies and the Parents' Bill of Rights were meant to be inclusive rather than exclusive, and were about the importance of involving parents in their children's education. Moe also stated that the legislation was merely codifying policies that already existed across the province. Over time, the government pointed to two specific instances that apparently helped to inform the decision to create the policies. The first was a June 2023 incident when non-school approved sexual health education material was obtained by a student after a presentation by Planned Parenthood in a Lumsden high school. The province responded by suspending Planned Parenthood from presenting in schools; following the suspension, the organization expressed surprise and disappointment that the government did not discuss the issue with them. The second was the government's discovery of an active procedure in the Regina Public School Division, which it argued deviated from the norm by explicitly stating a respect for student confidentiality. However, the School Division responded that the province never inquired about the procedure, which had been established following extensive consultations that included parents.

In regards to the provision requiring schools to fly the provincial flag, Cockrill stated that the provision was meant to boost provincial identity and pride.

== Reaction ==
=== Parental consent provisions ===
The parental consent provisions of Bill 137 inspired widespread debate and protest. Many experts and parents critical of the bill called it transphobic, a common charge against the broader parental rights' movement. Critics alleged that the movement seeks to roll back social gains made by LGBTQ advocates. Experts similarly argued that the bill was influenced by far-right political ideologies.

Critics of the Bill argued that students forced to come out to non-supportive families could face harm. Moreover, professional support workers, including social workers, said that the law does not align with support workers' ethics or best practices. In April 2024, it was revealed that an early draft of the initial government policy provided discretion for teachers to use students' preferred pronouns if there were concerns that involving parents might compromise a student's safety; this provision was ultimately removed from the policy, which led critics to renew questions about the government's process.

Sexual assault experts expressed concerns at being excluded by the law from sexual health education, stating that the exclusion puts children "at risk". Critics said that Saskatchewan boasts high rates of sexually transmitted infections—particularly HIV/AIDS—along with high rates of sexual assault, intimate partner violence, and teenage pregnancy. At a November 2023 Saskatchewan medical association conference in Saskatoon, medical professionals questioned Minister of Mental Health and Addictions Tim McLeod and noted that they expected an escalated mental health crisis as a result of the law.

The government was questioned on the need for the consent policies. Education Minister Cockrill was criticized for incorrectly claiming on August 29 that "every single government MLA" had heard from constituents that they had children who had been using different pronouns without their knowledge; the claim was immediately refuted by MLA Everett Hindley when he was asked if he had heard the same, and Premier Moe stated in an October 3 interview that he had not been made aware of any such discussions with parents. Cockrill was further criticized for claiming, without providing evidence, that the government had heard from "tens of thousands" of people in support of the policy. Moe persistently cited the popularity of the policy as a justification for its enactment, while the government dismissed polling that suggested that more than half of residents supported teacher discretion over parental consent. Several of the eighteen letters that the government received in the spring and summer of 2023 incorrectly characterized issues of gender and sexuality as "theories" and "ideologies".

On October 17, while the bill was still being debated in the legislature, Saskatchewan's human rights commissioner, Heather Kuttai, resigned in protest of the policy. Kuttai characterized the parental consent policy as "an attack" on children's rights and criticized the government for its unwillingness to heed criticism and make changes to the legislation. Two days later, the Human Rights Commission released a statement urging the government to reconsider the legislation and to work with it and other experts to revise it. The Commission committed to reviewing the law, and in November began seeking public feedback as part of that review.

Teachers in the province expressed concerns about the enactment of such policies from the outset, and in November dozens of teachers signed a petition urging school divisions not to follow the law, and committing themselves not to do so. Provincial labour unions were also critical of the law. Labour groups, including the Saskatchewan Federation of Labour and the Saskatchewan Government Employees Union, organized a large demonstration against the legislation while it was being debated.

=== Emergency debate ===
The government was criticized for recalling the legislature early to hold an emergency debate on the legislation, the first such recall in the province for 25 years. The Opposition argued that the 40 hours of debate on the bill in a shortened time frame was in fact minimal compared to the debate that would have come if the legislation had been introduced in a regular session. Moe's insistence that the legislation was merely codifying rules that were already in place across the province "by policy or practice" further prompted questions as to why there was a need to hastily rush the bill through the legislature outside of the normal process. In addition, the emergency debate raised questions about the government's priorities and why it was not holding emergency debates on issues like the broader state of the education system—with the government at an impasse with teachers over a new collective agreement—or the strained health care system. Opposition members also accused government members of streaming online entertainment during the debate; while this was unconfirmed, observers did note government members wearing headphones during debate.

=== Use of the notwithstanding clause ===
The provincial government's decision to preemptively invoke the notwithstanding clause to pass Bill 137 drew widespread criticism. In September, federal Justice Minister Arif Virani called the clause a "blunt instrument" and argued that its preemptive use was not "appropriate"; he argued that the legal process should run its course before a government considers using the clause. Howard Leeson, who served as Saskatchewan's deputy minister of intergovernmental affairs under Allan Blakeney's government when it helped to create the notwithstanding clause, agreed; Leeson explained that the clause was intended for use in "exceptional circumstances" and only after court processes had been completed. He stated that it "would have been better for the government to wait until after the merits of the case itself had been argued." The day before the bill was passed, fourteen University of Saskatchewan law faculty members wrote a letter to the government urging it to allow "the normal legal process to take its course" before passing the bill, explaining that the government's use of the notwithstanding clause was "well outside of the normal legal process", which would allow judges to first rule on the constitutionality of the law.

In response to criticism, Saskatchewan's Minister of Justice Bronwyn Eyre defended the government's use of the notwithstanding clause and stated that the government was "willing to be judged" on the policy.

=== Flag controversy ===
The amendment to require schools to fly the flag of Saskatchewan alongside the Canadian flag also drew controversy. A report from the Regina Leader-Post suggested that the requirement could cost schools that need to source and install additional flag poles thousands of dollars; the government did not commit to providing such funding. Critics said that many schools already have second flag poles that fly a variety of flags, such as Treaty flags, pride flags, and Métis flags; as such, critics suggested that the policy is designed to act as a de facto ban on flying such flags. Critics also questioned whether the intent of the provision is to downplay Canadian identity among Saskatchewan residents—earlier in 2023, the provincial government passed the Saskatchewan First Act, which was meant to "confirm" the province's autonomy.

== See also ==
- New Brunswick Policy 713
- Florida Parental Rights in Education Act
