= Eric Schmalz =

Canadian politician

The Honourable Eric Schmalz ECS MLA

Member of the Saskatchewan Legislative Assembly for Saskatchewan Rivers
- Incumbent
- Assumed office October 28, 2024
- Preceded by: Nadine Wilson

Personal details
- Party: Saskatchewan Party

Eric Schmalz is a Canadian politician who was elected to the Legislative Assembly of Saskatchewan in the 2024 general election, representing Saskatchewan Rivers as a member of the Saskatchewan Party.

Prior to his election, he served as reeve of the Rural Municipality of Prince Albert No. 461. During the election, he defeated incumbent Nadine Wilson, founder and former leader of the Saskatchewan United Party (which she had formed after resigning from the Saskatchewan Party caucus).
