= Lumsden-Morse =

Provincial electoral district in Saskatchewan, Canada

Saskatchewan electoral district

Provincial electoral district
- Legislature: Legislative Assembly of Saskatchewan
MLA
Blaine McLeod
Saskatchewan
- District created: 2013
- First contested: 2016
- Last contested: 2020

Demographics
- Census division(s): Division No. 6, Division No. 7, Division No. 8
- Census subdivision(s): Avonlea, Baildon No. 131, Beaver Flat, Belle Plaine, Bratt's Lake No. 129, Briercrest, Buena Vista, Caron No. 162, Caronport, Chaplin, Chaplin No. 164, Coderre, Craven, Disley, Drinkwater, Elmsthorpe No. 100, Ernfold, Excelsior No. 166, Grand Coulee, Herbert, Hillsborough No. 132, Longlaketon No. 219, Lumsden, Lumsden Beach, Lumsden No. 189, Moose Jaw, Moose Jaw No. 161, Morse, Morse No. 165, Mortlach, Pense, Pense No. 160, Redburn No. 130, Regina, Regina Beach, Rodgers No. 133, Rouleau, Rush Lake, Saskatchewan Landing No. 167, Sherwood No. 159, Stewart Valley, Swift Current No. 137, Terrell No. 101, Waldeck, Wheatlands No. 163, Wilcox

Lumsden-Morse is a provincial electoral district for the Legislative Assembly of Saskatchewan, Canada. It was created mostly from parts of Thunder Creek plus six other ridings and was first contested in the 2016 election.

The riding hugs the rural area along the Trans-Canada Highway between Swift Current and Regina, excluding Moose Jaw. In the northeast, it stretches to the shores of Last Mountain Lake to include the towns of Lumsden and Regina Beach.

== Members of the Legislative Assembly ==
Lumsden-Morse
Legislature	Years	Member	Party
Indian Head-Milestone, Regina Qu'Appelle Valley, Regina Wascana Plains, Swift Current, Thunder Creek, Weyburn-Big Muddy, and Wood River prior to 2016
28th	2016–2020	Lyle Stewart	Saskatchewan
29th	2020–2023	Lyle Stewart	Saskatchewan
29th	2023–2024	Blaine McLeod	Saskatchewan
30th	2024–present	Blaine McLeod	Saskatchewan

== Election results ==
2024 Saskatchewan general election
Party	Candidate	Votes	%	±%
Saskatchewan	Blaine McLeod	4,774	55.06	+1.64
New Democratic	Chauntel Baudu	2,157	24.88	+2.89
Saskatchewan United	Jon Hromek	1,371	15.81	-6.88
Progressive Conservative	Megan Torrie	308	3.55	–
Green	Isaiah Hunter	61	0.70	-0.09
Total valid votes		8,671	99.48	
Total rejected ballots		45	0.52	
Turnout		8,716	65.75	
Eligible voters		13,256		
Saskatchewan hold		Swing		
Source: Elections Saskatchewan

Saskatchewan provincial by-election, 10 August 2023 Resignation of Lyle Stewart
Party	Candidate	Votes	%	±%
Saskatchewan	Blaine McLeod	2,696	53.42	-19.98
Saskatchewan United	Jon Hromek	1,145	22.69	
New Democratic	Kaitlyn Stadnyk	1,110	21.99	+4.01
Buffalo	Les Guillemin	56	1.11	-4.87
Green	Isaiah Hunter	40	0.79	-1.86
Total valid votes		5,047	99.88	
Total rejected ballots		6	0.12	-0.30
Turnout		5,053	37.73	-25.66
Eligible voters		13,391		
Saskatchewan hold		Swing		-21.33
Source: Elections Saskatchewan

2020 Saskatchewan general election
Party	Candidate	Votes	%	±%
Saskatchewan	Lyle Stewart	6,243	73.40	-1.69
New Democratic	Nic Lewis	1,529	17.98	-1.89
Buffalo	Les Guillemin	509	5.98	–
Green	Isaiah Hunter	225	2.65	+0.50
Total valid votes		8,506	99.58	
Total rejected ballots		36	0.42	+0.15
Turnout		8,542	63.39	-1.48
Eligible voters		13,476		
Saskatchewan hold		Swing		+0.10
Source: Elections Saskatchewan

2016 Saskatchewan general election
Party	Candidate	Votes	%
Saskatchewan	Lyle Stewart	6,256	75.08
New Democratic	Rhonda Phillips	1,655	19.86
Liberal	Gerald Hiebert	242	2.90
Green	Patricia Crowther	179	2.15
Total valid votes		8,332	99.72
Total rejected ballots		23	0.28
Turnout		8,355	64.87
Eligible voters		12,880	
Source: Elections Saskatchewan

== See also ==
- List of Saskatchewan provincial electoral districts
- List of Saskatchewan general elections
- Canadian provincial electoral districts
