= Saskatchewan United Party =

Provincial political party in Canada

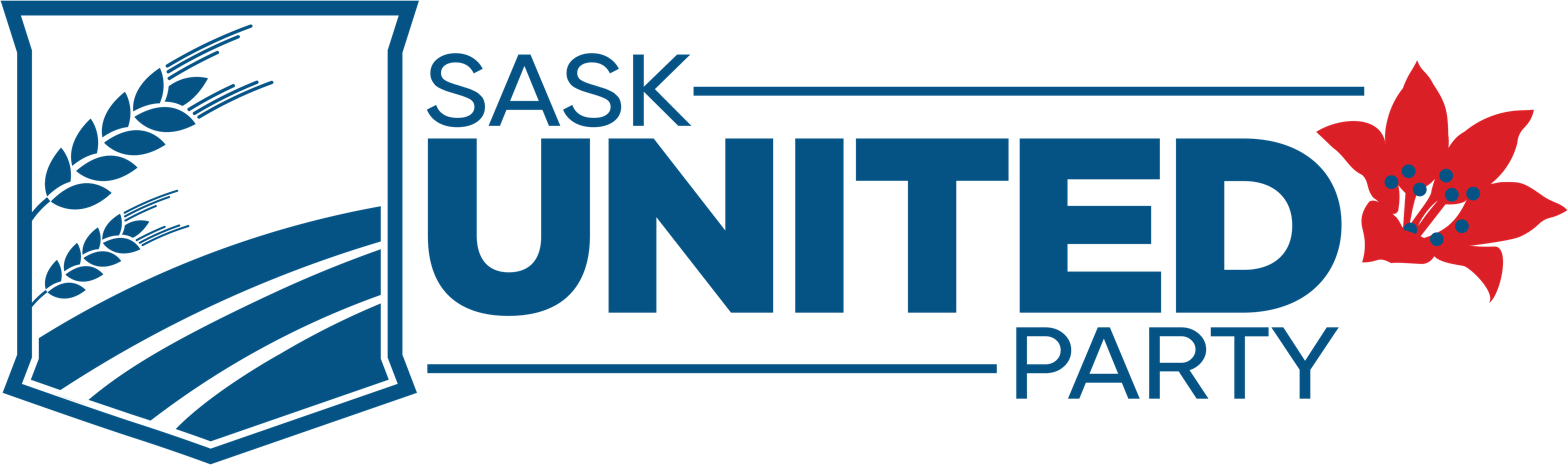
- Abbreviation: SUP
- Leader: Dwight Bunyan (interim)
- President: Dwight Bunyan
- Founders: Nadine Wilson; Gerry Ritz; Ken Rutherford
- Founded: 2022
- Registered: November 30, 2022; 3 years ago
- Split from: Saskatchewan Party
- Headquarters: Box 824 Stn Main; Regina, SK; S4P 3B1
- Ideology: Conservatism; Right-wing populism
- Political position: Right-wing
- Colours: Blue and red
- Slogan: Your conservative option for uniting Saskatchewan
- Seats in Legislature: 0 / 61

Website
- www.saskunited.ca

The Saskatchewan United Party (SUP) is a conservative political party in the Canadian province of Saskatchewan. The party was registered in November 2022. SUP was started by former Saskatchewan Party MLA Nadine Wilson, and has promoted right-wing populist ideology.

== History ==
=== Conception and foundation ===
Conservative organizers—including Independent and former Saskatchewan Party MLA Nadine Wilson, former Conservative Member of Parliament and federal agriculture minister Gerry Ritz, and former Maverick Party candidate Ken Rutherford—began holding meetings in early 2022 to try and establish another conservative political option for Saskatchewan. Wilson had become a vocal critic of the governing Saskatchewan Party's management of the COVID-19 pandemic, and resigned from the Saskatchewan Party caucus in September 2021 with the party revealing that she had lied about her COVID-19 vaccination status. An opposition to pandemic-related public health measures was at the centre of Wilson and Ritz's efforts in early 2022, and they worked alongside members of the anti-mandate group Unified Grassroots. The organizers also engaged with the organizers of the Christian conservative True North Saskatchewan as well as the Buffalo Party, discussing possible future mergers.

The Saskatchewan Progressive Conservative Party has alleged that these organizers attempted a "takeover" of the PC party with a plan to rebrand as the Saskatchewan Conservative Party with Wilson as its leader. In addition to the Conservative brand, such a move would have provided access to a $2.7 million trust fund. However, the takeover was rejected, and attention turned to establishing a new party. In 2023, the PCs alleged that Sask. United organizers stole a hard drive containing member and donor information, a charge those organizers denied.

The Saskatchewan United Party (SUP) was registered with Elections Saskatchewan on November 30, 2022, with Nadine Wilson appointed party leader and becoming its first member in the Legislature.

=== Nadine Wilson (2022–2024) ===
On Wilson's first day in the Legislature as SUP leader, she invited guests who purported to have suffered "vaccine injuries" and urged the government to meet with them.

The party hosted an official launch event on February 28, 2023 in Saskatoon, where it introduced its logo and policy agenda. The party's positions include promoting the agriculture, energy, and natural resource industries; promoting provincial sovereignty against federal and foreign powers; promoting gun rights; promoting "efficiency and opportunity" and less bureaucracy in health care; removing "ideologies" from school curricula; and increasing parental involvement in education.

The party ran a candidate for the first time in the August 2023 Lumsden-Morse by-election; SUP candidate Jon Hromek finished second to the Saskatchewan Party's Blaine McLeod with 23% of the vote. Wilson, who stated that she was "very pleased" with the result, attributed it to the party advocating for more parental involvement in the education system. In the fall of 2023, Hromek was named the deputy leader of SUP.

When, later in August 2023, the Saskatchewan Party introduced new education policies limiting sexual health education and requiring parental consent when students under the age of 16 desired to have their chosen names and pronouns affirmed at school, pressure from SUP was widely cited as the impetus. SUP took credit for forcing the government to adopt the policy in social media posts. The policies were ultimately enshrined in legislation called the Parents' Bill of Rights, with the government invoking the notwithstanding clause as part of the legislative process; Wilson voted in favour of the legislation.

=== Jon Hromek (2024) ===
On May 16, 2024, Wilson announced that she would step down as party leader, although she still intended to run for SUP in the 2024 election. Former deputy leader Jon Hromek, who had donated $200,000 to the party, was appointed as the new SUP leader. In September 2024, two more former Saskatchewan Party MLAs, Greg Brkich and Denis Allchurch, announced that they would run for SUP in the fall election. Brkich and Allchurch—the latter of whom had lost the Saskatchewan Party nomination to Scott Moe in Rosthern-Shellbrook before the 2011 election—expressed dissatisfaction with the direction of the Saskatchewan Party under Moe's leadership.

Hromek launched the party's campaign on October 2, 2024, stating that he hoped to have at least two candidates elected to the Legislative Assembly. However, no SUP candidates were elected, and Wilson lost the party's sole seat in the Saskatchewan Rivers riding to Saskatchewan Party candidate Eric Schmalz. The party received nearly four percent of the popular vote, which earned it a distant third-place finish. Hromek stated that SUP "can hold our head high and be proud of ourselves with what we accomplished", taking credit for pressuring the Saskatchewan Party to move further right in its policies.

On December 30, 2024, Hromek announced his resignation as SUP leader. In January 2025, he stated that after the election he believed that conservatives in the province saw the Saskatchewan Party as offering the best vehicle for right-wing politics in the province, and expressed an interest in running for the party's leadership, encouraging SUP supporters to sign up for Saskatchewan Party memberships.

=== Doug Forster (2025) ===
On January 28, 2025, Doug Forster became the interim leader. The party announced this on January 31. He was the SUP candidate in Yorkton in the 2024 election. He is a member of the City of Yorkton Planning Commission and a director at the Yorkton Chamber of Commerce.

On November 6, 2025, Forster left the role of interim leader. This move was announced by the party on November 27.

=== Dwight Bunyan (2025—present) ===
On December 4, 2025, Dwight Bunyan was listed as the new interim party leader. He also serves as president of the party.

== Ideology ==
Upon the launch of the party, Saskatoon StarPhoenix columnist Phil Tank noted the SUP's promotion of policy positions consistent with right-wing populist movements, such as stances against mass immigration, COVID-19 lockdowns, and vaccine mandates. The party has been labeled far-right, and has consistently claimed credit for encouraging the Saskatchewan Party to adopt more socially conservative policies. For its part, the SUP has promoted itself as a "true conservative option" for the province.

== Policies and positions ==
In its platform for the 2024 Saskatchewan general election, the party aimed to end the province's fuel tax and cut the provincial sales tax to 3%, cut property taxes for homeowners over the age of 65, and to institute a "full royalty framework review on potash". The party's health care strategy focused on privatization, offering retention bonuses to health care workers, providing tuition incentives for recruited health care students who agree to work in the province, and auditing health care administration. The SUP supports the removal of "ideology" and "indoctrination" from school curricula—with Hromek citing "genders" and the climate crisis as examples—and pledged to defund post-secondary institutions that do not "uphold and defend freedom of expression on campus". The party platform included a bathroom bill and a prohibition on "biological men" competing in women's sports. The party's platform also contained climate change denial, and positioned the party against green energy projects.

== Party leaders ==
† denotes acting or interim leader

#	Party Leader	Tenure	Notes
1	Nadine Wilson	November 30, 2022 – May 16, 2024	Wilson was a Saskatchewan Party MLA from 2007 to 2021, and an Independent MLA from 2021 to 2022. With the Saskatchewan Party, Wilson served as Provincial Secretary in the governments of Brad Wall and Scott Moe.
2	Jon Hromek	May 16, 2024 – December 30, 2024	Previously served as SUP deputy leader from 2023 to 2024.
†	Doug Forster	January 28, 2025 – November 6, 2025	SUP candidate in Yorkton in the 2024 election.
†	Dwight Bunyan	December 4, 2025 – present	Also serves as president of the party.

== Former Saskatchewan United Party MLAs ==
Member	District	Tenure	Notes
Nadine Wilson	Saskatchewan Rivers	2022–2024	Wilson was elected four times, always as a member of the Saskatchewan Party. Wilson served the last two years of the final term as a SUP member.

== Electoral performance ==
Election	Leader	Seats	Change	Place	Votes	%	Position
2024	Jon Hromek	0 / 61	Steady	▲3rd	18,023	3.9%	No seats

=== By-elections ===
By-election	Date	Candidate	Votes	%	Place
Lumsden-Morse	August 10, 2023	Jon Hromek	1,145	22.69%	2/5

== See also ==
- List of political parties in Saskatchewan
- Politics of Saskatchewan
