= 2017 Saskatoon Meewasin provincial by-election =

Saskatchewan legislative by-election

| ← 2016 | March 2, 2017 | 2020 → |

Riding of Saskatoon Meewasin
- Turnout: 41.55% (▼16.05%)
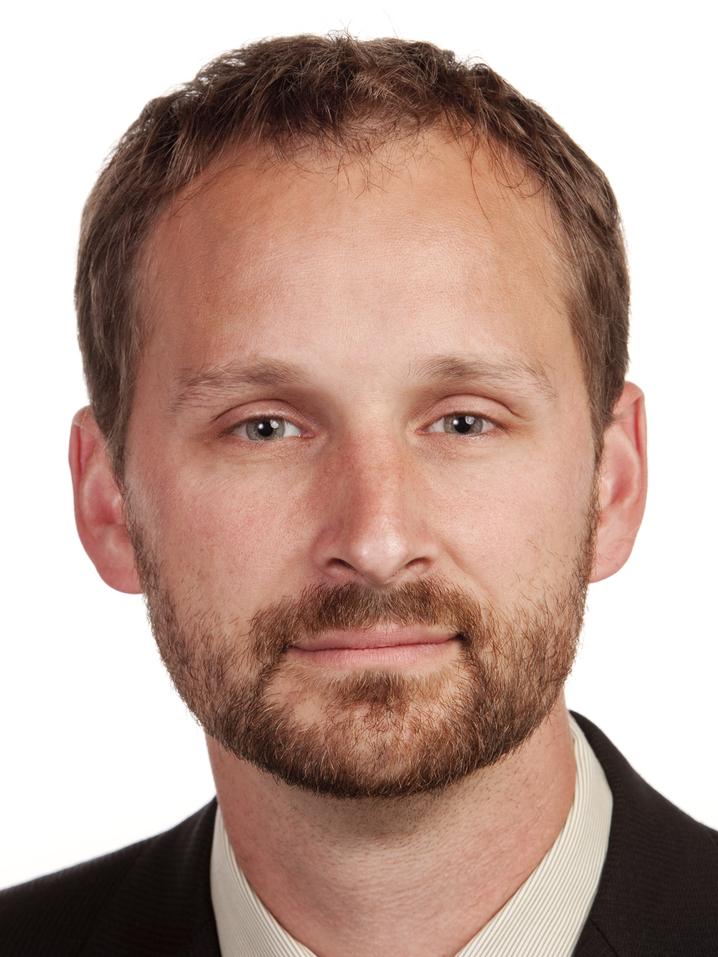
| | First party | Second party |
|---|---|---|
| | | SP |
| Candidate | Ryan Meili | Brent Penner |
| Party | New Democratic | Saskatchewan |
| Popular vote | 2,723 | 2,004 |
| Percentage | 54.17% | 39.86% |
| Swing | ▲11.22% | ▼10.63 |
- By-election results by polling division
MLA before election
Roger Parent
Saskatchewan
Elected MLA
Ryan Meili
New Democratic

The 2017 Saskatoon Meewasin provincial by-election was held on March 2, 2017 for the Legislative Assembly of Saskatchewan, in the province of Saskatchewan, Canada. The vote was called after the death of incumbent MLA Roger Parent of the Saskatchewan Party, who died of cancer on November 29, 2016.

Candidate Ryan Meili won the election, gaining the seat for the New Democratic Party.

== Background ==
On February 3, Chief Electoral Officer of Saskatchewan Dr. Michael Boda issued the writ for a March 2 by-election to Saskatoon Meewasin's returning officer Lloyd Howey. Candidate nominations would be accepted until February 14, with advance voting days set from February 24 to February 28. Premier Wall chose to hold the election before the Legislative Assembly of Saskatchewan returned for the spring period.

== Candidates ==
The New Democratic Party nominated Ryan Meili, who had previously run for the party's leadership in 2009 and 2013.

The Saskatchewan Party nominated Brent Penner, the executive director of Downtown Saskatoon. Penner defeated hopefuls Marv Friesen and Roxanne Kaminski at a party nomination meeting on January 30.

Liberal Party leader Darrin Lamoureux announced his candidacy for the by-election on January 18.

The Progressive Conservative Party nominated David Prokopchuk, the chairman of Saskatoon's Ukrainian Day in the Park.

The Green Party nominated their leader Shawn Setyo, who ran in the riding of Saskatoon Eastview in the previous provincial election.

== Results ==
Saskatchewan provincial by-election, March 2, 2017: Saskatoon Meewasin Death of Roger Parent
| Party | Candidate | Votes | % | ±% |
|---|---|---|---|---|
| New Democratic | Ryan Meili | 2,723 | 54.17 | +11.22 |
| Saskatchewan | Brent Penner | 2,004 | 39.86 | -10.63 |
| Liberal | Darrin Lamoureux | 183 | 3.64 | -0.79 |
| Progressive Conservative | David Prokopchuk | 64 | 1.27 | - |
| Green | Shawn Setyo | 53 | 1.05 | -1.08 |
| Total valid votes | | 5,027 | 99.82 | |
| Total rejected ballots | | 9 | 0.18 | -0.15 |
| Turnout | | 5,036 | 41.55 | -16.05 |
| Eligible voters | | 12,121 | | |
| New Democratic gain from Saskatchewan | | Swing | | +10.92 |

== See also ==
- 2022 Saskatoon Meewasin provincial by-election
