= 2023 Lumsden-Morse provincial by-election =

Provincial by-election in Saskatchewan, Canada

| August 10, 2023 |

District of Lumsden-Morse
- Turnout: 36.84%
| | First party | Second party | Third party |
|---|---|---|---|
| | SP | SUP | NDP |
| Candidate | Blaine McLeod | Jon Hromek | Kaitlyn Stadnyk |
| Party | Saskatchewan | Saskatchewan United | New Democratic |
| Popular vote | 2,696 | 1,145 | 1,110 |
| Percentage | 53.42% | 22.69% | 21.99% |
| Swing | ▼19.98 | New | ▲4.01 |
MLA before election
Lyle Stewart
Saskatchewan
Elected MLA
Blaine McLeod
Saskatchewan

A by-election was held in the provincial riding of Lumsden-Morse in Saskatchewan on August 10, 2023, to elect a new member of the Legislative Assembly of Saskatchewan following the resignation of Saskatchewan Party MLA Lyle Stewart.

It was held the same day as two others in the province; Regina Coronation Park and Regina Walsh Acres.

== Candidates ==
The list of candidates:

- Les Guillemin: Buffalo Party of Saskatchewan
- Kaitlyn Stadnyk: Saskatchewan New Democratic Party
- Isaiah Hunter: Saskatchewan Green Party
- Blaine McLeod: Saskatchewan Party
- Jon Hromek: Saskatchewan United Party

== Results ==
Saskatchewan provincial by-election, 10 August 2023: Lumsden-Morse Resignation of Lyle Stewart
| Party | Candidate | Votes | % | ±% |
|---|---|---|---|---|
| Saskatchewan | Blaine McLeod | 2,696 | 53.42 | -19.98 |
| Saskatchewan United | Jon Hromek | 1,145 | 22.69 | N/A |
| New Democratic | Kaitlyn Stadnyk | 1,110 | 21.99 | +4.01 |
| Buffalo | Les Guillemin | 56 | 1.11 | -4.87 |
| Green | Isaiah Hunter | 40 | 0.79 | -1.86 |
| Total valid votes | | 5,047 | 99.88 | |
| Total rejected ballots | | 6 | 0.12 | -0.30 |
| Turnout | | 5,053 | 37.73 | -25.66 |
| Eligible voters | | 13,391 | | |
| Saskatchewan hold | | Swing | | -21.33 |
Source: Elections Saskatchewan

== 2020 result ==
2020 Saskatchewan general election: Lumsden-Morse
| Party | Candidate | Votes | % | ±% |
|---|---|---|---|---|
| Saskatchewan | Lyle Stewart | 6,243 | 73.40 | -1.69 |
| New Democratic | Nic Lewis | 1,529 | 17.98 | -1.89 |
| Buffalo | Les Guillemin | 509 | 5.98 | – |
| Green | Isaiah Hunter | 225 | 2.65 | +0.50 |
| Total valid votes | | 8,506 | 99.58 | |
| Total rejected ballots | | 36 | 0.42 | +0.15 |
| Turnout | | 8,542 | 63.39 | -1.48 |
| Eligible voters | | 13,476 | | |
| Saskatchewan hold | | Swing | | +0.10 |
Source: Elections Saskatchewan

== See also ==
- List of Saskatchewan by-elections
