= Green Party of Saskatchewan =

Provincial political party in Canada

Saskatchewan Green Party
- Leader: Naomi Hunter
- President: Mike Hamm
- Deputy Leader: Victor Lau
- Founded: 1998
- Registered: 1999
- Headquarters: 301 227 Pinehouse Drive, Saskatoon, SK, S7K 6N9
- Ideology: Green politics
- Political position: Centre-left
- Colours: Green
- Seats in Legislature: 0 / 61

Website
- www.saskgreen.ca

The Saskatchewan Green Party is a Green political party in Saskatchewan, Canada. The party was founded as the New Green Alliance in 1998 by a coalition of environmental and social justice activists. In the twenty-first century, only the New Democratic Party and the Saskatchewan Party have fielded more candidates than the Greens in provincial elections, although no Greens have been elected to the Legislature. The current party leader is Naomi Hunter.

== History ==
=== Foundations and the New Green Alliance ===
In the mid-1990s, a number of environmental and social justice activists began to organize against the perceived rightward drift of the governing New Democrats (NDP) under Premier Roy Romanow, who were seen to have embraced Third Way politics. In April 1998, organizers held a news conference, stating their intention "... to create a political party committed to protect the environment from corporate plunder and to advance a social justice agenda," before officially registering the New Green Alliance (NGA) with Elections Saskatchewan in January 1999. Early on, the party debated focusing on community activism over electoralism—future party leader Victor Lau stated in 1998 that in his opinion, "... 20 per cent of the energy of the new party should be devoted to electoral politics and 80 per cent to promoting community projects like low-cost housing, new transit systems, or solar energy." Others looked to revive the democratic socialist politics of Tommy Douglas, the first CCF/NDP Premier of Saskatchewan, which they argued the NDP had drifted away from.

The party's first leader was anti-nuclear activist Neil Sinclair. In the 1999 provincial election, the NGA ran 16 candidates province-wide, earning 1% of the vote and approximately 4% of the vote on average where they ran. The NGA, whose platform was characterized as "counter-ideological" in contrast to the NDP and Saskatchewan Party, who were competing to form government, found it difficult to garner media attention during the campaign. In the 2003 election, under the leadership of Ben Webster, the party ran 27 candidates but actually lost support compared to 1999, earning only 0.6% of the vote province-wide.

=== Saskatchewan Green Party ===
In 2005, the NGA changed its name to come in line with the federal Greens, becoming the Green Party of Saskatchewan; however, the party maintained that it was only loosely affiliated with the Green Party of Canada. The party had several short-term leaders between 2005 and 2006, when antiwar and anti-vaccination activist Sandra Finley became leader ahead of the 2007 provincial election. The Greens ran a much larger campaign in 2007, fielding candidates in 48 out of 58 ridings. The party was able to capture 2.0% of the vote; Harold Johnson, running in the Cumberland riding, received 6.2% of the vote and secured the first third-place finish for the Greens.

On 6 September, 2011—the unofficial kickoff for the 2011 provincial election campaign—Green leader Larissa Shasko resigned her position to join the campaign of Regina South NDP candidate Yens Pedersen. Upon her resignation, Shasko cited frustrations with the "inner workings" of the party and concerns about a potential candidate. Her resignation triggered a visit to Saskatoon by federal Green leader Elizabeth May, who also announced that deputy leader Victor Lau had been elevated to become the provincial party's new leader—a decision that was reinforced by party members at a special leadership convention held on 25 September. Lau and the party ran a full slate of 58 candidates—a first for the party—43% of which were women. Although no Green candidates were elected, the party increased its vote share and emerged from the election as the third largest party in the province, surpassing the Liberals for the first time.

After the 2011 election, the party began an effort to organize on a constituency basis across the province. In March 2015, the party was rebranded as the Saskatchewan Green Party and ran a nearly full slate again in the 2016 provincial election under Lau, though fell back in vote share across the province, finishing in fourth place.

In March 2020, former federal Green candidate Naomi Hunter was named leader of the Greens ahead of the 2020 provincial election. In the election, the party increased its vote share, finishing with its second highest total after 2011, but again finished fourth, this time finishing behind the fledgling Buffalo Party. The party saw its vote share decline in the 2024 election, although it again finished in fourth place overall.

== Election results ==
Election	Leader	# of candidates	# of elected candidates	Votes	%	Place	Legislative role
1999	Neil Sinclair	16 / 58	0 / 58	4,101	1.01%	4th	No seats
2003	Ben Webster	27 / 58	0 / 58	2,323	0.55%	▼5th	No seats
2007	Sandra Finley	48 / 58	0 / 58	9,076	2.01%	▲4th	No seats
2011	Victor Lau	58 / 58	0 / 58	11,461	2.89%	▲3rd	No seats
2016	Victor Lau	58 / 61	0 / 61	7,967	1.83%	▼4th	No seats
2020	Naomi Hunter	60 / 61	0 / 61	10,033	2.25%	4th	No seats
2024	Naomi Hunter	58 / 61	0 / 61	7,957	1.80%	4th	No seats

=== By-elections ===
By-election	Date	Candidate	Votes	%	Place
Regina Dewdney	June 28, 1999	Victor Lau	333	9.86	4/4
Saskatoon Fairview	June 28, 1999	Neil Sinclair	70	2.40	4/4
Wood River	June 26, 2000	Peter Borch	431	6.40	4/4
Regina Elphinstone	February 26, 2001	Stanley Kline	82	2.48	4/5
Saskatoon Riversdale	March 19, 2001	Neil Sinclair	39	0.85	5/5
Saskatoon Idylwyld	November 8, 2001	Dave Greenfield	68	1.82	4/5
Saskatoon Fairview	March 17, 2003	Jason Hanson	82	2.71	4/4
Martensville	March 5, 2007	Sandra Finley	100	2.17	4/6
Cumberland	June 25, 2008	Tory McGregor	181	5.76	3/3
Regina Douglas Park	September 21, 2009	Victor Lau	471	7.60	3/3
Saskatoon Riversdale	September 21, 2009	Tobi-Dawne Smith	83	2.04	4/4
Saskatoon Northwest	October 18, 2010	Larissa Shasko	122	2.35	5/5
Lloydminster	November 26, 2014	Luke Bonsan	49	1.75	5/5
Saskatoon Meewasin	March 2, 2017	Shawn Setyo	53	1.05	5/5
Saskatoon Fairview	September 7, 2017	Taylor Bolin	61	1.34	5/5
Kindersley	March 1, 2018	Yvonne Potter-Pihach	74	1.95	3/3
Melfort	March 1, 2018	Shawn Setyo	77	1.85	3/3
Swift Current	March 1, 2018	Maria Rose Lewans	67	1.30	3/4
Regina Northeast	September 12, 2018	Jessica Schroeder	96	1.93	4/6
Saskatoon Meewasin	September 26, 2022	Jacklin Andrews	58	1.18	5/5
Regina Coronation Park	August 10, 2023	Kendra Anderson	122	3.39	4/5
Lumsden-Morse	August 10, 2023	Isaiah Hunter	40	0.79	5/5
Regina Walsh Acres	August 10, 2023	Joseph Reynolds	40	0.86	4/4

== Party leaders ==
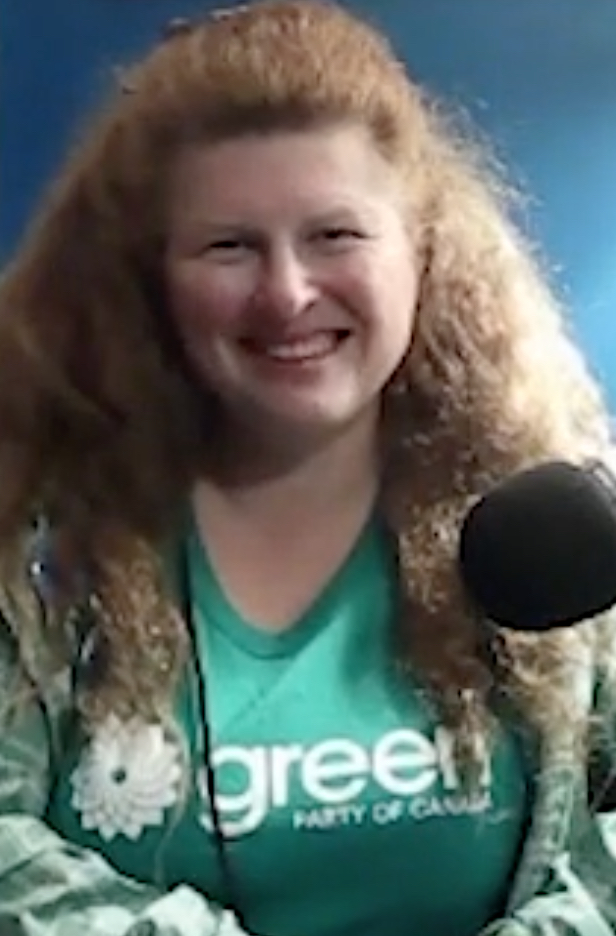
Naomi Hunter, party leader since 2020.

† Denotes interim leader

#	Party Leader	Highest Position	Tenure	Notes
1	Neil Sinclair	Party leader	1999 – 2002	
2	Ben Webster	Party leader	2002 – 2005	
3	Neal Anderson	Party leader	2005 – 2006	
†	Victor Lau	Party leader	2006	Interim
†	John Kern	Party leader	2006	Interim
4	Sandra Finley	Party leader	2006 – 2008	
5	Amber Jones	Party leader	2008 – 2009	
6	Larissa Shasko	Party leader	2009 – 2011	
7	Victor Lau	Party leader	2011 – 2016	First leader to organize a full slate of candidates for a general election.
8	Shawn Setyo	Party leader	2016 – 2019	
†	Richard Jack	Party leader	2019 – 2020	Interim
9	Naomi Hunter	Party leader	2020 – present	

== See also ==
- List of Green party leaders in Canada
- List of Green politicians who have held office in Canada
- List of Saskatchewan general elections
- List of political parties in Saskatchewan
- Politics of Saskatchewan
