= Buffalo Party of Saskatchewan =

- Abbreviation: BPSK
- Leader: Phillip Zajac
- President: Reese Hunstad
- Founded: 2020
- Registered: March 10, 2020
- Headquarters: PO Box 10 Kindersley, SK S0L 1S0
- Membership: >500 (2025)
- Ideology: Western separatism Populism
- Political position: Right-wing
- Colours: Yellow
- Seats in Legislature: 0 / 61

Website
- www.buffalopartybpsk.ca

The Buffalo Party of Saskatchewan (BPSK) is a conservative, populist, and separatist provincial political party in Saskatchewan. The party was established in 2020 as Wexit Saskatchewan and contested its first election that year. The party finished with the third highest vote share in the 2020 provincial election, although no party members were elected to the Legislative Assembly.

== History ==
=== Wexit Saskatchewan ===
The 2019 federal election provided the impetus for the organization of the Buffalo Party. The Conservative Party of Canada won every seat in Saskatchewan, and 54 out of 62 across the Prairie provinces, while the Liberal Party of Canada secured a minority government. The results stoked feelings of western alienation, or the sense that western Canadian perspectives were being ignored at the federal level. Immediately after the election, Saskatchewan Premier Scott Moe proposed a "New Deal" with the federal government. He called for an end to the federal carbon tax, renegotiation of the equalization formula, and the approval of new pipeline projects. In the weeks after the election, discussions began about the creation of a new western separatist party, a political strategy that had previously gained traction on the Prairies in the early 1980s, resulting in parties like the Western Canada Concept and the Unionest Party. The new movement was dubbed the "Wexit" movement, a portmanteau of "western" and "exit" and a play on Brexit. The movement adopted the slogan "The West Wants Out", the inverse of Preston Manning's Reform Party slogan from the 1980s, "The West Wants In".

In the fall of 2019, volunteers began collecting signatures to form a Wexit Party in Saskatchewan. The group emphasized that its priority was to pressure Moe to hold a referendum on separation for the province, and that, if he did not agree to do so they would form a party with that goal in mind. While the Saskatchewan Party government issued a statement that it was opposed to secession, former Sask Party MLA—and Reform Party MP—Allan Kerpan acted as a spokesperson for the Wexit Saskatchewan group.

On March 10, 2020, Wexit Saskatchewan was officially registered as a provincial party by Elections Saskatchewan, with Jake Wall serving as interim leader. Once registered, Wexit Saskatchewan proposed a referendum on independence in its platform.

=== Buffalo Party ===
In July 2020, the party announced that membership had voted to change its name to the Buffalo Party of Saskatchewan, and that Wall had stepped down as interim leader and had been replaced by Wade Sira, who was appointed by the party's board. The Buffalo name was derived from the early twentieth century proposal to create one large western province called Buffalo, before the federal government instead created two new provinces in Alberta and Saskatchewan. Sira stated that the party's priority remained independence, and that if a proposed referendum on separation failed to pass, the party would continue to advocate for greater sovereignty, including in the areas of immigration and natural resources. Sira pointed to Quebec's position within Confederation as something the province could aim to emulate.

Other Wexit parties similarly rebranded. Wexit Canada became the Maverick Party, while the Alberta party merged another, the Freedom Conservative Party, to form the Wildrose Independence Party.

On August 31, 2021, Sira was removed as interim leader of the party after a unanimous vote by the party's board. Sira, who missed the meeting, said he found out about his removal through media reports. After the decision was announced, nine party caucus members signed a letter criticizing the board decision and alleging that the board ignored conflicts of interest in making the decision; the members asserted that the caucus still had confidence in Sira's leadership. The party board accused Sira of making unapproved financial commitments, which Sira denied. The party planned to launch a formal leadership selection process at its annual general meeting in the fall of 2021. Shirley Huber was chosen to replace Sira as interim leader.

On March 25, 2022, Phillip Zajac, who finished second as a Buffalo candidate in the Estevan riding in the 2020 provincial election, became the first elected leader of the Buffalo Party, defeating Clint Arnason, the party's candidate in the 2022 by-election in the Athabasca riding. Zajac appeared to soften the party's stance on independence, stating that the party desired more autonomy, and that it sought smaller government and lower taxes.

In September 2024, ahead of the 2024 provincial election, the Buffalo Party was approached by the Progressive Conservative Party to discuss a merger that could enable a unified party to field a full slate of candidates. However, on September 12, PC leader Rose Buscholl announced that the talks had ended without an agreement, citing the Buffalo Party's "extensive focus on out-of-scope federal and international issues" as a deal-breaker. Zajac stated that he thought "the pros" of a merger "outweigh the cons", and that he was disappointed in the lack of an agreement.

In February 2025, the Buffalo Party faced online backlash opposing its scheduled March 1, 2025 fundraising event at the German Club in Regina, SK. The event, titled “Should Saskatchewan Become the 51st US State?”—has drawn online commenters to call for plans to protest—which prompted the political party to hire security and ask for a police presence in case protests do happen. The fundraiser will feature Lee Harding (has written for The Epoch Times and Western Standard) speaking, Lise Merle (has written for Rebel News) to speak in favour of removing “radical gender ideology from education”, to end with a panel discussion and a “mock audience vote” on whether to separate from Canada or not.

On April 12, 2025, Zajac was voted out of his position by a confidence vote at the party's annual general meeting. However, four days later, the party ruled that the meeting was declared unconstitutional.

==== Elections ====
The Buffalo Party ran seventeen candidates in the 2020 provincial election. The party ran on a platform opposing public health mandates—the 2020 election took place during the COVID-19 pandemic—and proposing tax cuts; during the campaign, Sira also claimed that the province was not being negatively impacted by climate change. The party surprised many by finishing second in four rural ridings and third in the provincial popular vote—with 2.6%—despite not running candidates in 44 of 61 districts. The party had second-place finishes to the Saskatchewan Party in Cypress Hills, Kindersley, Estevan, and Cannington—the only third party to secure a second-place finish in any district. Immediately after the election, in which Moe's Saskatchewan Party was re-elected, Moe made statements supporting greater independence and autonomy for Saskatchewan, stating that his government shared the "frustrations" and many of the "objectives" of Buffalo Party supporters. Moe would later adopt similar language to the Buffalo Party, calling for Saskatchewan to be recognized as a "nation within a nation" and for more autonomy in the areas of policing, immigration, and taxation.

The Buffalo Party contested a provincial by-election in September 2022 in Saskatoon Meewasin, with former People's Party of Canada candidate Mark Friesen as its candidate; Friesen, a prominent protester of public health measures who was sent to Ontario for intensive care treatment for COVID-19, finished fourth. The party contested another by-election in August 2023 in Lumsden-Morse, again finishing fourth.

Phillip Zajac launched Buffalo's 2024 election campaign on October 2, 2024, with two pronouncements—that the party wished to see the creation of a Ministry of Seniors and Veterans Affairs, and that the party supported the revival of the Saskatchewan Transportation Company, a crown corporation that was shut down by the Saskatchewan Party government in 2017. Zajac also committed to abolishing the provincial sales tax and bolstering rural hospitals. Ultimately, the party failed to build on its surprise 2020 third-place finish; Zajac finished third in his riding of Estevan-Big Muddy, the best result for any Buffalo candidate as the party dropped to sixth among the seven registered parties, receiving less than one percent of the vote province wide. Although Zajac stated that he was "disappointed" with the results, he asserted that "Buffalo's not going anywhere".

== Ideology ==
While the Buffalo Party's primary aim has been to secure a referendum on independence for Saskatchewan, much of its politics have been described as traditionally right-wing and populist. The party favours smaller government, lower taxes, and promotes individualism. In recent years, there has been a proliferation of right-wing political movements in the province, and Zajac has stated that he has invited other groups to join the Buffalo Party. These include members of Unified Grassroots, an anti-vaccine mandate group that ultimately played a role in the formation of another new party, the Saskatchewan United Party, in 2022, and the Christian conservative group True North Saskatchewan, who were also seeking party registration in 2022.

In 2023, the Buffalo Party listed the "True North Declaration" as one of its party documents; the document, written by a British Columbia resident, is a Christian conservative populist manifesto asserting self determination for provinces and territories.

== Electoral performance ==
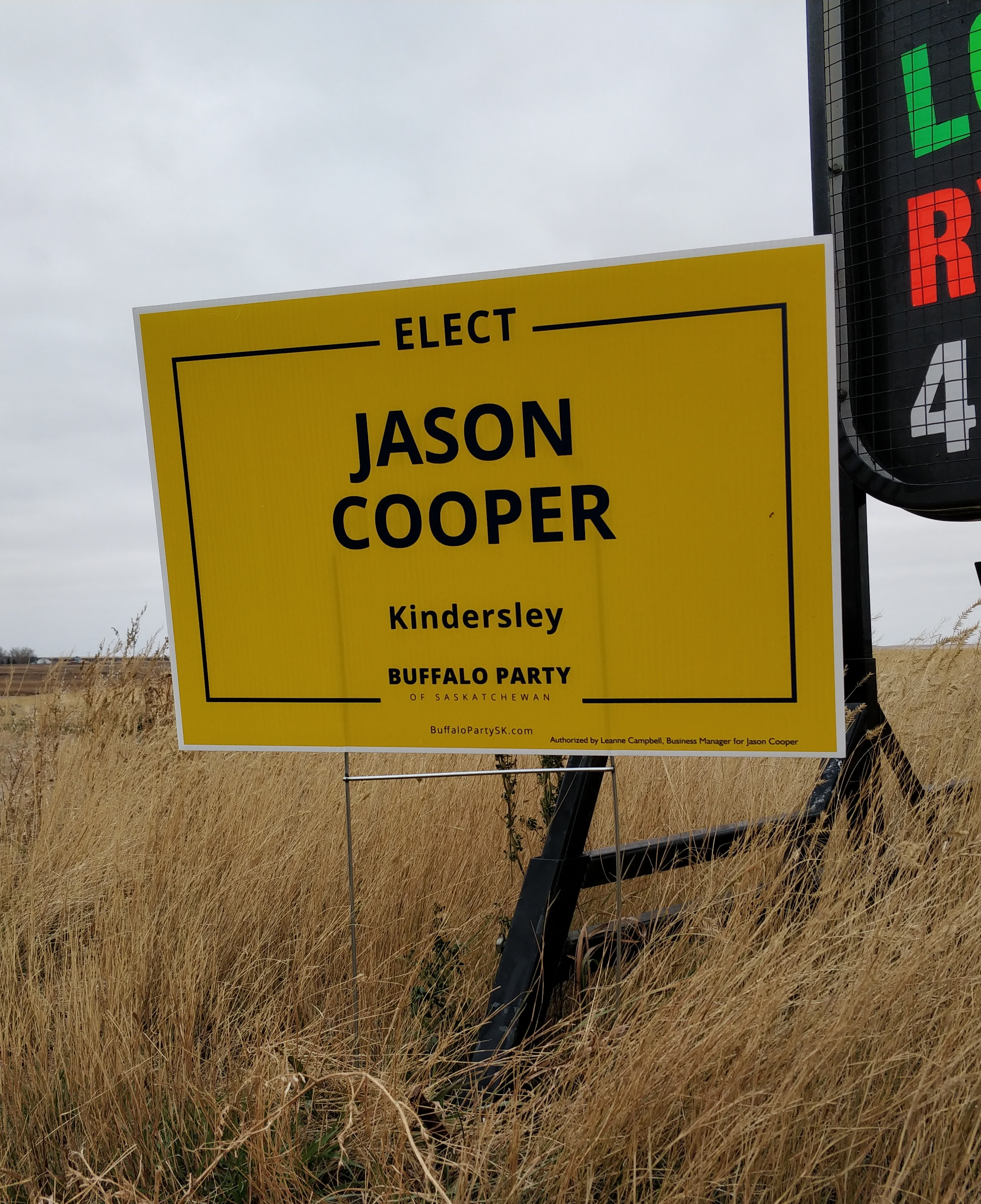
A lawn sign from the party's 2020 provincial election campaign.

The 2020 provincial election was the Buffalo Party's first.

Election	Leader	Seats	Change	Place	Votes	%	Position
2020	Wade Sira	0 / 61	0	▲3rd	11,298	2.56%	No seats
2024	Phillip Zajac	0 / 61	0	▼6th	3,267	0.7%	No seats

=== By-elections ===
By-election	Date	Candidate	Votes	%	Place
Athabasca	February 15, 2022	Clint Arnason	12	0.5%	4/4
Saskatoon Meewasin	September 26, 2022	Mark Friesen	112	2.36%	4/5
Lumsden-Morse	August 10, 2023	Les Guillemin	56	1.11%	4/5

== Party leaders ==
† Denotes vacancy or acting/interim leader

#	Party Leader	Highest Position	Tenure	Notes
†	Jake Wall	Party leader	March 10, 2020 – July 26, 2020	
†	Wade Sira	Party leader	July 26, 2020 – August 31, 2021	Led party in the 2020 provincial election
†	Shirley Huber	Party leader	August 31, 2021 – March 25, 2022	
1	Phillip Zajac	Party leader	March 25, 2022 – present	First elected leader of the party

== See also ==
- Politics of Saskatchewan
