= 2022 Saskatoon Meewasin provincial by-election =

- September 26, 2022

Riding of Saskatoon Meewasin
- Turnout: 37.51% (▼18.79%)
	First party	Second party
	NDP	SP
Candidate	Nathaniel Teed	Kim Groff
Party	New Democratic	Saskatchewan
Popular vote	2,624	1,712
Percentage	56.77%	37.04%
Swing	▲5.53%	▼9.12%
- A map of Saskatoon's provincial ridings, showing Saskatoon Meewasin highlighted in red.
MLA before election
Ryan Meili
New Democratic
Elected MLA
Nathaniel Teed
New Democratic

The 2022 Saskatoon Meewasin provincial by-election was held on September 26, 2022, for the Legislative Assembly of Saskatchewan, in Canada.

== Background ==
Ryan Meili was elected in the 2017 Saskatoon Meewasin provincial by-election. He resigned in June 2022.

== Candidates ==
Five parties registered candidates:

- Mark Friesen (Buffalo Party of Saskatchewan)
- Nathaniel Teed (Saskatchewan New Democratic Party)
- Kim Groff (Saskatchewan Party)
- Jeff Walters (Saskatchewan Liberal Party)
- Jacklin Andrews (Green Party of Saskatchewan)

== Election ==
Advance voting began on September 20.

Saskatchewan provincial by-election, September 27, 2022: Saskatoon Meewasin Resignation of Ryan Meili
Party	Candidate	Votes	%	±%
New Democratic	Nathaniel Teed	2,624	56.77	+5.53
Saskatchewan	Kim Groff	1,712	37.04	-9.12
Liberal	Jeff Walters	118	2.55	
Buffalo	Mark Friesen	112	2.42	
Green	Jacklin Andrews	56	1.21	-1.39
Total valid votes		4,622	99.89	
Total rejected ballots		5	0.11	-1.04
Turnout		4,627	37.51	-18.79
Eligible voters		12,336		
New Democratic hold		Swing		+7.32
Source: Elections Saskatchewan

== See also ==
- 2017 Saskatoon Meewasin provincial by-election
