= Blaine McLeod =

Canadian politician from Saskatchewan

Blaine McLeod MLA

Member of the Legislative Assembly of Saskatchewan for Lumsden-Morse
- Incumbent
- Assumed office August 10, 2023
- Preceded by: Lyle Stewart

Personal details
- Party: Saskatchewan Party
- Occupation: farmer

Blaine McLeod is a Canadian politician from the Saskatchewan Party, who was elected to the Legislative Assembly of Saskatchewan in the 2023 Lumsden-Morse provincial by-election.

Born and raised in rural Saskatchewan, McLeod has operated Caroncrest Dairy Farms for over 40 years. He has previously served as the Saskatchewan director of Dairy Farmers of Canada.

McLeod is married to his wife Marlie and has two sons and one daughter.
