= Elections Saskatchewan =

Agency that runs elections in Saskatchewan

- Logo since 2014

Agency overview
- Formed: 1959
- Jurisdiction: Elections and plebiscites in Saskatchewan
- Headquarters: 301-3303 Hillsdale Street; Regina, Saskatchewan
- Annual budget: $4,377,031
- Agency executive: Dr. Michael Boda, Chief Electoral Officer
- Website: Official website

Elections Saskatchewan is the non-partisan organization which oversees general elections and by-elections for the Legislative Assembly of Saskatchewan.
