= 27th Saskatchewan Legislature =

The 27th Legislative Assembly of Saskatchewan was elected in the 2011 Saskatchewan election, and was sworn in on November 30, 2011. It sat until March 8, 2016. It was controlled by the Saskatchewan Party under Premier Brad Wall.

== Members ==
Member	Party	District	First elected / previously elected	No.# of term(s)
Greg Brkich	Saskatchewan Party	Arm River-Watrous	1999	4th term
Buckley Belanger	New Democratic Party	Athabasca	1995 (Note: First elected as a Liberal)	5th term
Delbert Kirsch	Saskatchewan Party	Batoche	2003	3rd term
Randy Weekes	Saskatchewan Party	Biggar	1999	4th term
Dan D'Autremont	Saskatchewan Party	Cannington	1991 (Note: First elected as a Progressive Conservative)	6th term
Ken Krawetz	Saskatchewan Party	Canora-Pelly	1995	5th term
Fred Bradshaw	Saskatchewan Party	Carrot River Valley	2007	2nd term
Doyle Vermette	New Democratic Party	Cumberland	2008	2nd term
Larry Doke	Saskatchewan Party	Cut Knife-Turtleford	2011	1st term
Wayne Elhard	Saskatchewan Party	Cypress Hills	1999	5th term
Doreen Eagles	Saskatchewan Party	Estevan	1999	4th term
Donna Harpauer	Saskatchewan Party	Humboldt	1999	4th term
Don McMorris	Saskatchewan Party	Indian Head-Milestone	1999	4th term
June Draude	Saskatchewan Party	Kelvington-Wadena	1995	5th term
Bill Boyd	Saskatchewan Party	Kindersley	1991, 2007	5th term*
Glen Hart	Saskatchewan Party	Last Mountain-Touchwood	1999	4th term
Tim McMillan (Until September 30, 2014)	Saskatchewan Party	Lloydminster	2007	2nd term
Colleen Young (From November 14, 2014)	Saskatchewan Party	Lloydminster	2014	1st term
Nancy Heppner	Saskatchewan Party	Martensville	2007	3rd term
Jeremy Harrison	Saskatchewan Party	Meadow Lake	2007	2nd term
Kevin Phillips	Saskatchewan Party	Melfort	2011	1st term
Bob Bjornerud	Saskatchewan Party	Melville-Saltcoats	1995	5th term
Warren Michelson	Saskatchewan Party	Moose Jaw North	2007	2nd term
Greg Lawrence	Saskatchewan Party	Moose Jaw Wakamow	2011	1st term
Don Toth	Saskatchewan Party	Moosomin	1986	7th term
Darryl Hickie	Saskatchewan Party	Prince Albert Carlton	2007	2nd term
Victoria Jurgens	Saskatchewan Party	Prince Albert Northcote	2011	1st term
Mark Docherty	Saskatchewan Party	Regina Coronation Park	2011	1st term
Gene Makowsky	Saskatchewan Party	Regina Dewdney	2011	1st term
Russ Marchuk	Saskatchewan Party	Regina Douglas Park	2011	1st term
Warren McCall	New Democratic Party	Regina Elphinstone-Centre	2001	4th term
John Nilson	New Democratic Party	Regina Lakeview	1995	5th term
Kevin Doherty	Saskatchewan Party	Regina Northeast	2011	1st term
Laura Ross	Saskatchewan Party	Regina Qu'Appelle Valley	2007	2nd term
Trent Wotherspoon	New Democratic Party	Regina Rosemont	2007	2nd term
Bill Hutchinson	Saskatchewan Party	Regina South	2007	2nd term
Warren Steinley	Saskatchewan Party	Regina Walsh Acres	2011	1st term
Christine Tell	Saskatchewan Party	Regina Wascana Plains	2007	2nd term
Jim Reiter	Saskatchewan Party	Rosetown-Elrose	2007	2nd term
Scott Moe	Saskatchewan Party	Rosthern-Shellbrook	2011	1st term
Nadine Wilson	Saskatchewan Party	Saskatchewan Rivers	2007	2nd term
David Forbes	New Democratic Party	Saskatoon Centre	2001	4th term
Corey Tochor	Saskatchewan Party	Saskatoon Eastview	2011	1st term
Jennifer Campeau	Saskatchewan Party	Saskatoon Fairview	2011	1st term
Rob Norris	Saskatchewan Party	Saskatoon Greystone	2007	2nd term
Cam Broten	New Democratic Party	Saskatoon Massey Place	2007	2nd term
Roger Parent	Saskatchewan Party	Saskatoon Meewasin	2011	1st term
Gordon Wyant	Saskatchewan Party	Saskatoon Northwest	2010	2nd term
Cathy Sproule	New Democratic Party	Saskatoon Nutana	2011	1st term
Danielle Chartier	New Democratic Party	Saskatoon Riversdale	2009	2nd term
Ken Cheveldayoff	Saskatchewan Party	Saskatoon Silver Springs	2003	3rd term
Don Morgan	Saskatchewan Party	Saskatoon Southeast	2003	3rd term
Paul Merriman	Saskatchewan Party	Saskatoon Sutherland	2011	1st term
Brad Wall	Saskatchewan Party	Swift Current	1999	4th term
Herb Cox	Saskatchewan Party	The Battlefords	2011	1st term
Lyle Stewart	Saskatchewan Party	Thunder Creek	1999	4th term
Dustin Duncan	Saskatchewan Party	Weyburn-Big Muddy	2006	3rd term
Yogi Huyghebaert	Saskatchewan Party	Wood River	2000	4th term
Greg Ottenbreit	Saskatchewan Party	Yorkton	2007	2nd term

== Standings changes since the 27th general election ==
Number of members per party by date	2011	2014		2015	
Number of members per party by date	Nov 7	Sep 30	Nov 14	Mar 9	Dec 31
Saskatchewan Party	49	48	49	48	47
NDP	9				
Total Members	58	57	58	57	56
Vacant	0	1	0	1	2
Government Majority	40	39	40	39	38

Membership changes in the 27th Assembly
Date	Name	District	Party	Reason
November 7, 2011	See List of Members			Election day of the 27th Saskatchewan general election
September 30, 2014	Tim McMillan	Lloydminster	Saskatchewan Party	Resigned seat
November 14, 2014	Colleen Young	Lloydminster	Saskatchewan Party	Elected in a by-election
March 9, 2015	Darryl Hickie	Prince Albert Carlton	Saskatchewan Party	Resigned seat
October 18, 2015	Rob Norris	Saskatoon Greystone	Saskatchewan Party	Resigned seat
