= Lloydminster (electoral district) =

Provincial electoral district in Saskatchewan, Canada

Coordinates: 53°50′N 109°40′W

Saskatchewan electoral district

Provincial electoral district
- Legislature: Legislative Assembly of Saskatchewan
MLA
Colleen Young
Saskatchewan
- District created: 1908, re-created 1994
- First contested: 1995
- Last contested: 2020

Demographics
- Electors: 10,693
- Census division: Division No. 17
- Census subdivision(s): Beaver River No. 622, Big Island Lake Cree Territory, Britannia No. 502, Eldon No. 471, Frenchman Butte No. 501, Lloydminster, Loon Lake No. 561, Makoo 120, Marshall, Ministikwan 161, Ministikwan 161A, Onion Lake 119-1, Paradise Hill, Pierceland, Seekaskootch 119, Wilton No. 472

Lloydminster is a provincial electoral district for the Legislative Assembly of Saskatchewan, Canada. The riding was last contested in the 2020 general election, when it returned Saskatchewan Party MLA Colleen Young.

The constituency includes the Saskatchewan side of the city of Lloydminster and areas to the north and east of the city, including the towns of Marshall, Pierceland, and Paradise Hill.

== History ==
A district called Lloydminster was created for the 1908 general election and dissolved before the 1934 general election. From 1934 to 1995, the Lloydminster area was included in the Cut Knife constituency, which was renamed Cut Knife-Lloydminster in 1964.

The modern Lloydminster constituency was reconstituted for the 1995 general election, mostly from Cut Knife-Lloydminster, along with parts of Meadow Lake, Turtleford and Redberry, encompassing urban Lloydminster and areas directly east of the city including the towns of Turtleford, Maidstone and Paradise Hill.

The district was significantly reconfigured before the 2003 general election, losing most areas south and east of Lloydminster to the newly created Cut Knife-Turtleford while gaining a large area north of Lloydminster (along the Alberta border) from Meadow Lake. The district has not been significantly reconfigured since 2003, but it lost a small amount of territory to Meadow Lake before the 2016 general election, largely due to population growth in the city of Lloydminster. An area immediately southeast of the Lloydminster city limits (including the town of Marshall) will move to Cut Knife-Turtleford for the next general election for similar reasons.

Lloydminster originally returned an NDP member after its creation, but has returned Saskatchewan Party members since the 1999 general election.

== Members of the Legislative Assembly ==
Legislature	Years	Member	Party
23rd	1995–1999	Violet Stanger	New Democrat
24th	1999–2003	Milt Wakefield	Saskatchewan Party
25th	2003–2007	Milt Wakefield	Saskatchewan Party
26th	2007–2011	Tim McMillan	Saskatchewan Party
27th	2011–2014	Tim McMillan	Saskatchewan Party
27th	2014–2016	Colleen Young	Saskatchewan Party
28th	2016–2020	Colleen Young	Saskatchewan Party
29th	2020–2024	Colleen Young	Saskatchewan Party
30th	2024–present	Colleen Young	Saskatchewan Party

== Election results ==
2024 Saskatchewan general election
Party	Candidate	Votes	%	±%
Saskatchewan	Colleen Young	3,497	77.04	-5.37
New Democratic	Adam Tremblay	728	16.04	+4.68
Saskatchewan United	Joshua Bloom	276	6.08	
Green	Patrick McNally	38	0.84	-0.36
Total valid votes		4,539		
Total rejected ballots				
Turnout				
Eligible voters				
Saskatchewan hold		Swing		
Source: Elections Saskatchewan

2020 Saskatchewan general election
Party	Candidate	Votes	%	±%
Saskatchewan	Colleen Young	3,846	82.41	-3.74
New Democratic	Colleen Morrell Henning	530	11.36	+2.81
Buffalo	Steve Gessner	235	5.03	–
Green	Audra Kish	56	1.20	-0.08
Total valid votes		4,667	99.55	
Total rejected ballots		21	0.45	–
Turnout		4,688	–	–
Eligible voters		–		
Saskatchewan hold		Swing		–
Source: Elections Saskatchewan, Global News

2016 Saskatchewan general election
Party	Candidate	Votes	%	±%
Saskatchewan	Colleen Young	4,350	86.15	+21.93
New Democratic	Michelle Oleksyn	432	8.55	-20.25
Liberal	Dolores Pahtayken	202	4.00	+1.26
Green	Lisa Grant	65	1.28	-0.47
Total valid votes		5,049	100.0	
Eligible voters		–		
Saskatchewan hold		Swing		-
Source: Elections Saskatchewan, Global News

Saskatchewan provincial by-election, November 26, 2014 On the resignation of Tim McMillan
Party	Candidate	Votes	%	±%
Saskatchewan	Colleen Young	1,802	64.22	-2.20
New Democratic	Wayne Byers	808	28.80	-0.30
Liberal	Darrin Lamoureux	77	2.74	-
Progressive Conservative	Randall Edge	70	2.49	-
Green	Luke Bonsan	49	1.75	-2.74
Total valid votes		2,806	100.00	
Saskatchewan hold		Swing		-0.95

2011 Saskatchewan general election: Lloydminster electoral district
Party	Candidate	Votes	%	±%
Saskatchewan	Tim McMillan	2,797	66.42	+5.13
New Democratic	Wayne Byers	1,225	29.09	-7.68
Green	Meggan Hougham	189	4.49	–
Total		4,211	100.00	

2007 Saskatchewan general election: Lloydminster electoral district
Party	Candidate	Votes	%	±%
Saskatchewan	Tim McMillan	3,219	61.29%	+11.71%
New Democratic	Grant Whitstone	1,931	36.77%	-11.21%
Liberal	John M. MacGowan	102	1.94%	-0.50%
Total		5,252	100.00%	

2003 Saskatchewan general election: Lloydminster electoral district
Party	Candidate	Votes	%	±%
Saskatchewan	Milt Wakefield	1,990	49.58%	-3.54%
New Democratic	Wayne Byers	1,926	47.98%	+9.38%
Liberal	Richard Sparks	98	2.44%	-5.84%
Total		4,014	100.00%	

1999 Saskatchewan general election: Lloydminster electoral district
Party	Candidate	Votes	%	±%
Saskatchewan	Milton Wakefield	2,938	53.12%	–
New Democratic	Violet Stanger	2,135	38.60%	-5.12%
Liberal	Larry Ingram	458	8.28%	-9.12%
Total		5,531	100.00%	

1995 Saskatchewan general election: Lloydminster electoral district
Party	Candidate	Votes	%	±%
NDP	Violet Stanger	2,592	43.72%	–
Prog. Conservative	Steven Turnbull	2,326	39.24%	–
Liberal	Donald C. Young	1,010	17.04%	–
Total		5,928	100.00%	

== See also ==
- List of Saskatchewan provincial electoral districts
- List of Saskatchewan general elections
- Canadian provincial electoral districts
