= 2023 Regina Walsh Acres provincial by-election =

Provincial by-election in Saskatchewan, Canada

- August 10, 2023

District of Regina Walsh Acres
- Turnout: 37.64%
	First party	Second party
	NDP	SP
Candidate	Jared Clarke	Nevin Markwart
Party	New Democratic	Saskatchewan
Popular vote	2,535	1,842
Percentage	54.66%	39.71%
Swing	▲17.01	▼6.90
MLA before election
Derek Meyers
Saskatchewan
Elected MLA
Jared Clarke
New Democratic

A by-election was held in the provincial riding of Regina Walsh Acres in Saskatchewan on August 10, 2023 to elect a new member of the Legislative Assembly of Saskatchewan following the death of Saskatchewan Party MLA Derek Meyers.

It was held the same day as two others in the province; Lumsden-Morse and Regina Coronation Park.

== Candidates ==
The list of candidates:

- Jared Clarke: Saskatchewan New Democratic Party
- Joseph Reynolds: Saskatchewan Green Party
- Nevin Markwart: Saskatchewan Party
- Rose Buscholl: Progressive Conservative Party of Saskatchewan

== Result ==
Saskatchewan provincial by-election, 10 August 2023: Regina Walsh Acres Death of Derek Meyers
Party	Candidate	Votes	%	±%
New Democratic	Jared Clarke	2,535	54.66	+17.01
Saskatchewan	Nevin Markwart	1,842	39.72	-6.90
Progressive Conservative	Rose Buscholl	221	4.76	+0.84
Green	Joseph Reynolds	40	0.86	
Total valid votes		4,638	99.89	
Total rejected ballots		5	0.11	-0.68
Turnout		4,643	39.42	-17.07
Eligible voters		11,777		
New Democratic gain from Saskatchewan		Swing		+11.96
Source: Elections Saskatchewan

== 2020 result ==
2020 Saskatchewan general election: Regina Walsh Acres
Party	Candidate	Votes	%	±%
Saskatchewan	Derek Meyers	3,148	46.62	-4.68
New Democratic	Kelly Hardy	2,542	37.65	-5.06
Independent	Sandra Morin	797	11.80	-
Progressive Conservative	Ken Grey	265	3.92	-
Total valid votes		6,752	99.21	
Total rejected ballots		54	0.79	+0.61
Turnout		6,806	56.49	-2.09
Eligible voters		12,048		
Saskatchewan hold		Swing		+0.19
Source: Elections Saskatchewan

== See also ==
- List of Saskatchewan by-elections
