= Andrew James Macauley =

Canadian politician

MLA for Cut Knife
- In office 1934–1938
- Preceded by: George John McLean
- Succeeded by: William Roseland

Personal details
- Born: May 14, 1887 Harriston, Ontario, Canada
- Died: May 14, 1939 (aged 52) Saskatoon, Saskatchewan, Canada
- Party: Co-operative Commonwealth Federation
- Profession: Farmer, rancher

Andrew James Macauley (May 14, 1887 – May 14, 1939) was a farmer, rancher and political figure in Saskatchewan. He represented Cut Knife from 1934 to 1938 in the Legislative Assembly of Saskatchewan as a Farmer-Labour Group member. The FLG was affiliated with the national Co-operative Commonwealth Federation and would become the Saskatchewan Co-operative Commonwealth Federation (CCF) in 1935.

He was born in Harriston, Ontario and moved west in 1905. Macauley worked as a labourer on the Grand Trunk Pacific Railway and later operated a ranch at Waseca, Saskatchewan with his two brothers. They raised Aberdeen-Angus cattle and Clydesdale horses. In 1912, he joined the Saskatchewan Grain Growers. He was a director for the United Farmers of Canada and was president from 1931 to 1932. He was defeated by William Roseland when he ran for reelection to the provincial assembly in 1938. Macauley died in a Saskatoon hospital following an operation for a brain tumour.
