= Colleen Young =

Colleen Young may refer to:

- Colleen Young (politician), Canadian provincial politician
- Colleen Young (swimmer), American swimmer
