= Michael Chisholm (politician) =

Canadian provincial politician (born 1948)

MLA for Cut Knife-Turtleford
- In office November 5, 2003 – October 10, 2011
- Preceded by: first member
- Succeeded by: Larry Doke

Personal details
- Born: August 26, 1948 (age 77) North Battleford, Saskatchewan, Canada
- Party: Saskatchewan Party
- Occupation: accountant

Michael Chisholm (born August 26, 1948) is a Canadian provincial politician. He was a Saskatchewan Party member of the Legislative Assembly of Saskatchewan from 2003 to 2011, and is also a member of the federal Conservative Party of Canada. In 2003 he was elected for the newly created constituency of Cut Knife-Turtleford, and was re-elected in 2007. He is the vice-chair of the government's public-accounts committee.

== Personal life ==
Chisholm was born in North Battleford, Saskatchewan and grew up on a farm in Maidstone. Prior to running for public office in 2003, Chisholm was an accountant. He is married with three sons and three grandchildren.

== Controversy ==
Chisholm was involved in a minor controversy in May 2008, when he called NDP MLA Deb Higgins a "dumb bitch" during a debate. Chisholm did not directly say the statement to Higgins personally, but it was audible enough to be recorded as he sat back down. Chisholm resigned as legislative secretary a few days later.
