= Milton Wakefield =

Canadian politician

MLA for Lloydminster
- In office September 16, 1999 – November 7, 2007
- Preceded by: Violet Stanger
- Succeeded by: Tim McMillan

Personal details
- Born: 1939 or 1940 (age 85–86) Maidstone, Saskatchewan
- Party: Saskatchewan Party

Milton Wakefield (born 1939 or 1940) is a Canadian provincial politician. He was the Saskatchewan Party member of the Legislative Assembly of Saskatchewan for the constituency of Lloydminster from 1999 to 2007.
