= Robert Gavin Long =

Canadian politician

Robert Gavin Long (March 3, 1937 – June 4, 2011) was a farmer and political figure in Saskatchewan. He represented Cut Knife-Lloydminster from 1978 to 1982 in the Legislative Assembly of Saskatchewan as a New Democratic Party (NDP) member.

He was born in Maymont, Saskatchewan, the son of Donald Charles Long, and moved to the Lloydminster area with his family in 1947. Long was first employed as a heavy equipment operator but turned to farming in 1962. In 1964 he married Phyllis Joyce Murray, who died in 1974. In 1975, he remarried to Eva Marie Sych.

He served in the provincial cabinet as Minister of Highways and Transportation. He was defeated by Michael Hopfner when he ran for reelection to the Saskatchewan assembly in 1982. From 1988 to 1992, Long was president of the provincial NDP. He also served as district chair for the Saskatchewan Highway Traffic Board.

Long died in Lloydminster, Alberta at the age of 74.
