= Nevin Markwart =

Canadian ice hockey player (born 1964)

- Born: December 9, 1964 (age 61) Toronto, Ontario, Canada
- Height: 5 ft 10 in (178 cm)
- Weight: 180 lb (82 kg; 12 st 12 lb)
- Position: Left wing
- Shot: Left
- Played for: Boston Bruins; Calgary Flames; EHC Biel
- NHL draft: 21st overall, 1983; Boston Bruins
- Playing career: 1981–1993

Nevin Markwart (born December 9, 1964) is a Canadian former professional ice hockey winger who played 309 games in the National Hockey League.

== Early life ==
Markwart was born in Toronto, Ontario, but grew up in Regina, Saskatchewan. He played junior hockey with the Regina Blues and Regina Pats. Markwart graduated from Luther College in Saskatchewan in 1982. Markwart earned a Master of Business Administration from Northeastern University and a Master of Science in cybersecurity from Brown University.

== Career ==
Markwart was selected in first round, 21st overall, by the Bruins in the 1983 NHL entry draft. He played for the Boston Bruins and Calgary Flames between 1983 and 1992.

After retiring from hockey, Markwart has worked in finance and cybersecurity. Markwart ran for the Saskatchewan Party in the 2023 by-election in Regina Walsh Acres, losing to the New Democratic Party's Jared Clarke.

== Career statistics ==
=== Regular season and playoffs ===
			Regular season					Playoffs
Season	Team	League	GP	G	A	Pts	PIM	GP	G	A	Pts	PIM
1980–81	Regina Pat Canadians AAA	SMHL	65	43	78	121	193	—	—	—	—	—
1981–82	Regina Pat Blues	SJHL	45	18	36	54	185	—	—	—	—	—
1981–82	Regina Pats	WHL	25	2	12	14	56	20	2	2	4	82
1982–83	Regina Pats	WHL	43	27	39	66	91	1	0	0	0	0
1983–84	Boston Bruins	NHL	70	14	16	30	121	—	—	—	—	—
1984–85	Boston Bruins	NHL	26	0	4	4	36	1	0	0	0	0
1984–85	Hershey Bears	AHL	38	13	18	31	79	—	—	—	—	—
1985–86	Boston Bruins	NHL	65	7	15	22	207	—	—	—	—	—
1986–87	Boston Bruins	NHL	64	10	9	19	225	4	0	0	0	9
1986–87	Moncton Golden Flames	AHL	3	3	3	6	11	—	—	—	—	—
1987–88	Boston Bruins	NHL	25	1	12	13	85	2	0	0	0	2
1988–89	Maine Mariners	AHL	1	0	1	1	0	—	—	—	—	—
1989–90	Boston Bruins	NHL	8	1	2	3	15	—	—	—	—	—
1990–91	Boston Bruins	NHL	23	3	3	6	36	12	1	0	1	22
1990–91	Maine Mariners	AHL	21	5	5	10	22	—	—	—	—	—
1991–92	EHC Biel-Bienne	NDA	4	2	2	4	2	—	—	—	—	—
1991–92	Boston Bruins	NHL	18	3	6	9	44	—	—	—	—	—
1991–92	Maine Mariners	AHL	17	4	7	11	32	—	—	—	—	—
1991–92	Calgary Flames	NHL	10	2	1	3	25	—	—	—	—	—
1992–93	Springfield Indians	AHL	7	2	0	2	24	—	—	—	—	—
NHL totals			309	41	68	109	794	19	1	0	1	33

== Electoral record ==
Saskatchewan provincial by-election, 10 August 2023: Regina Walsh Acres Death of Derek Meyers
Party	Candidate	Votes	%	±%
New Democratic	Jared Clarke	2,535	54.66	+17.01
Saskatchewan	Nevin Markwart	1,842	39.72	-6.90
Progressive Conservative	Rose Buscholl	221	4.76	+0.84
Green	Joseph Reynolds	40	0.86	
Total valid votes		4,638	99.89	
Total rejected ballots		5	0.11	-0.68
Turnout		4,643	39.42	-17.07
Eligible voters		11,777		
New Democratic gain from Saskatchewan		Swing		+11.96
Source: Elections Saskatchewan

Preceded by Gord Kluzak	Boston Bruins first-round draft pick 1983	Succeeded by Dave Pasin
