= Cut Knife (electoral district) =

Former provincial electoral district in Saskatchewan, Canada

Coordinates: 53°00′N 109°25′W

Cut Knife is a former provincial electoral district for the Legislative Assembly of the province of Saskatchewan, Canada. This constituency was created before the 4th Saskatchewan general election in 1917. Redrawn to include the former district of Lloydminster in 1934, the constituency was renamed "Cut Knife-Lloydminster" in 1964.

This district was dissolved before the 23rd Saskatchewan general election in 1995. It is now part of the Lloydminster and Cut Knife-Turtleford constituencies.

== Members of the Legislative Assembly ==
=== Cut Knife (1917–1964) ===
#	MLA	Served	Party
1.	William Hamilton Dodds	1917–1929	Liberal
2.	George John McLean	1929–1934	Independent, Conservative
3.	Andrew James Macauley	1934–1938	Farmer-Labour
4.	William Roseland	1938–1944	Social Credit
5.	Isidore Nollet	1944–1964	CCF

=== Cut Knife-Lloydminster (1964–1995) ===
#	MLA	Served	Party
1.	Isidore Nollet	1964–1967	CCF
2.	Miro Kwasnica	1967–1978	New Democrat
3.	Robert Long	1978–1982	New Democrat
4.	Michael Hopfner	1982–1991	Progressive Conservative
5.	Violet Stanger	1991–1995	New Democrat

== Election results ==
1917 Saskatchewan general election: Cut Knife electoral district
Party	Candidate	Votes	%	±%
Liberal	William Hamilton Dodds	799	54.88%	–
Conservative	Samson J. Graham	657	45.12%	–
Total		1,456	100.00%	

1921 Saskatchewan general election: Cut Knife electoral district
Party	Candidate	Votes	%	±%
Liberal	William Hamilton Dodds	931	57.47%	+2.59
Independent	Tom C. Raymond	689	42.53%	–
Total		1,620	100.00%	

1925 Saskatchewan general election: Cut Knife electoral district
Party	Candidate	Votes	%	±%
Liberal	William Hamilton Dodds	829	50.67%	-6.80
Progressive	Ernest R. Reid	807	49.33%	–
Total		1,636	100.00%	

1929 Saskatchewan general election: Cut Knife electoral district
Party	Candidate	Votes	%	±%
Independent	George John McLean	1,452	56.67%	-
Liberal	John Allan Young	1,110	43.33%	-7.34
Total		2,562	100.00%	

1934 Saskatchewan general election: Cut Knife electoral district
Party	Candidate	Votes	%	±%
Farmer-Labour	Andrew James Macauley	3,268	46.13%	–
Liberal	Robert James Gordon	2,718	38.36%	-4.97
Conservative	George John McLean	1,099	15.51%	-41.16
Total		7,085	100.00%	

1938 Saskatchewan general election: Cut Knife electoral district
Party	Candidate	Votes	%	±%
Social Credit	William Roseland	2,471	37.35%	–
Liberal	John A. Gordon	2,379	35.96%	-2.40
CCF	Andrew James Macauley	1,766	26.69%	-19.44
Total		6,616	100.00%	

1944 Saskatchewan general election: Cut Knife electoral district
Party	Candidate	Votes	%	±%
CCF	Isidore Nollet	2,726	59.97%	+33.28
Liberal	John A. Gordon	1,820	40.03%	+4.07
Total		4,546	100.00%	

1948 Saskatchewan general election: Cut Knife electoral district
Party	Candidate	Votes	%	±%
CCF	Isidore Nollet	3,027	48.82%	-11.15
Social Credit	Fred F. Wilson	1,642	26.48%	-
Liberal	William Bradley	1,531	24.70%	-15.33
Total		6,200	100.00%	

1952 Saskatchewan general election: Cut Knife electoral district
Party	Candidate	Votes	%	±%
CCF	Isidore Nollet	3,598	52.69%	+3.87
Liberal	E.C. Burlingham	2,268	33.21%	+8.51
Social Credit	William R. Appleton	963	14.10%	-12.38
Total		6,829	100.00%	

1956 Saskatchewan general election: Cut Knife electoral district
Party	Candidate	Votes	%	±%
CCF	Isidore Nollet	3,338	50.70%	-1.99
Liberal	Guy Powers	1,862	28.29%	-4.92
Social Credit	Stanley Phillips	1,383	21.01%	+6.91
Total		6,583	100.00%	

1960 Saskatchewan general election: Cut Knife electoral district
Party	Candidate	Votes	%	±%
CCF	Isidore Nollet	2,396	42.38%	-8.32
Liberal	Hans V. Nielson	1,844	32.61%	+4.32
Prog. Conservative	Charles W. Taylor	785	13.88%	-
Social Credit	Stanley Phillips	629	11.13%	-9.88
Total		5,654	100.00%	

=== Cut Knife-Lloydminster (1964 – 1995) ===
1964 Saskatchewan general election: Cut Knife-Lloydminster electoral district
Party	Candidate	Votes	%	±%
CCF	Isidore Nollet	2,927	45.99%	+3.61
Liberal	Raymond R. Rooney	1,821	28.61%	-4.00
Prog. Conservative	Gordon Goodfellow	1,617	25.40%	+11.52
Total		6,365	100.00%	

1967 Saskatchewan general election: Cut Knife-Lloydminster electoral district
Party	Candidate	Votes	%	±%
NDP	Miro Kwasnica	2,862	44.47%	-1.52
Liberal	Ben Gulak	2,121	32.95%	+4.34
Prog. Conservative	Gordon Goodfellow	1,289	20.03%	-5.37
Social Credit	Walter B. Hoover	164	2.55%	-
Total		6,436	100.00%	

1971 Saskatchewan general election: Cut Knife-Lloydminster electoral district
Party	Candidate	Votes	%	±%
NDP	Miro Kwasnica	3,748	59.59%	+15.12
Liberal	Ben Gulak	2,542	40.41%	+7.46
Total		6,290	100.00%	

1975 Saskatchewan general election: Cut Knife-Lloydminster electoral district
Party	Candidate	Votes	%	±%
NDP	Miro Kwasnica	2,794	40.01%	-19.58
Prog. Conservative	Fred Baynton	2,113	30.26%	-
Liberal	Sam Herman	2,076	29.73%	-10.68
Total		6,983	100.00%	

1978 Saskatchewan general election: Cut Knife-Lloydminster electoral district
Party	Candidate	Votes	%	±%
NDP	Robert Long	3,828	52.44%	+12.43
Prog. Conservative	Bob Kent	3,213	44.01%	+13.75
Liberal	Bill Taylor	259	3.55%	-26.18
Total		7,300	100.00%	

1982 Saskatchewan general election: Cut Knife-Lloydminster electoral district
Party	Candidate	Votes	%	±%
Progressive Conservative	Michael Hopfner	4,968	54.95%	+10.94
NDP	Robert Long	3,963	43.84%	-8.60
Liberal	L. Allison Henderson	109	1.21%	-2.34
Total		9,040	100.00%	

1986 Saskatchewan general election: Cut Knife-Lloydminster electoral district
Party	Candidate	Votes	%	±%
Progressive Conservative	Michael Hopfner	4,526	52.32%	-2.63
NDP	Robert Long	3,677	42.50%	-1.34
Liberal	Virginia Fox	448	5.18%	+3.97
Total		8,651	100.00%	

1991 Saskatchewan general election: Cut Knife-Lloydminster electoral district
Party	Candidate	Votes	%	±%
NDP	Violet Stanger	3,843	47.59%	+5.09
Prog. Conservative	Michael Hopfner	2,899	35.90%	-16.42
Liberal	Aldo Del Frari	1,333	16.51%	+11.33
Total		8,075	100.00%	

== See also ==
- List of Saskatchewan provincial electoral districts
- List of Saskatchewan general elections
- Canadian provincial electoral districts
