= Miro Kwasnica =

Canadian politician

Miro Kwasnica (June 13, 1935 – December 24, 2023) was an educator, driving instructor and political figure in Saskatchewan. He represented Cut Knife from 1967 to 1975 and Cut Knife-Lloydminster from 1975 to 1978 in the Legislative Assembly of Saskatchewan as a New Democratic Party (NDP) member.

He was born in Wakaw, Saskatchewan, the son of Peter Kwasnica and Alice Bayers – both emigrants from Ukraine – and was educated in Wakaw, at the Saskatoon Teacher's College and at the University of Saskatchewan. He settled in Lloydminster. In 1955, Kwasnica married Patricia Alice Guggenmos; the couple later divorced.
