= Jared Clarke =

Canadian politician from Saskatchewan

Jared Clarke MLA

Member of the Legislative Assembly of Saskatchewan for Regina Walsh Acres
- Incumbent
- Assumed office August 10, 2023
- Preceded by: Derek Meyers

Deputy Caucus Chair of the Saskatchewan New Democratic Party
- Incumbent
- Assumed office November 13, 2024

Shadow Minister of Municipal Affairs and Environment
- Incumbent
- Assumed office November 13, 2024
- Preceded by: Erika Ritchie

Personal details
- Born: Regina, Saskatchewan
- Party: Saskatchewan New Democratic Party
- Occupation: Teacher

Jared Clarke is a Canadian politician from the Saskatchewan New Democratic Party, who was elected to the Legislative Assembly of Saskatchewan in the 2023 Regina Walsh Acres provincial by-election.

As of June 22, 2024, he serves as the Official Opposition critic for Environment and for Rural and Remote Health.

== Career ==
Before entering politics, Clarke worked as a teacher. He was the Saskatchewan NDP candidate for the riding of Indian Head-Milestone in the 2020 Saskatchewan provincial election, where he placed second. He was elected to the Legislative Assembly of Saskatchewan in the 2023 Regina Walsh Acres provincial by-election; and subsequently re-elected in the 2024 provincial election.

== Electoral record ==
2024 Saskatchewan general election: Regina Walsh Acres
Party	Candidate	Votes	%	±%
New Democratic	Jared Clarke	4,700	56.99	+2.33
Saskatchewan	Liaqat Ali	3,073	37.26	–2.46
Saskatchewan United	Bonnie Farrell	352	4.27	–
Green	Dianna Holigroski	122	1.48	+0.62
Total valid votes		8,247	99.42	
Total rejected ballots		48	0.58	+0.47
Turnout		8,295		
Eligible voters		–		
Source: Elections Saskatchewan

Saskatchewan provincial by-election, 10 August 2023: Regina Walsh Acres Death of Derek Meyers
Party	Candidate	Votes	%	±%
New Democratic	Jared Clarke	2,535	54.66	+17.01
Saskatchewan	Nevin Markwart	1,842	39.72	-6.90
Progressive Conservative	Rose Buscholl	221	4.76	+0.84
Green	Joseph Reynolds	40	0.86	–0.89
Total valid votes		4,638	99.89	
Total rejected ballots		5	0.11	-0.68
Turnout		4,643	39.42	-17.07
Eligible voters		11,777		
New Democratic gain from Saskatchewan		Swing		+11.96
Source: Elections Saskatchewan

2020 Saskatchewan general election: Indian Head-Milestone
Party	Candidate	Votes	%	±%
Saskatchewan	Don McMorris	5,626	67.02	-0.33
New Democratic	Jared Clarke	2,371	28.24	+3.92
Progressive Conservative	Elvin Mandziak	251	2.99	+0.03
Green	Billy Patterson	147	1.75	-0.13
Total valid votes		8,395	99.55	
Total rejected ballots		38	0.45	–
Turnout		8,433	–	–
Eligible voters		–		
Saskatchewan hold		Swing		–
Source: Elections Saskatchewan
