= Violet Stanger =

Canadian politician (1940–2023)

Member of the Legislative Assembly of Saskatchewan
- In office 1991–1995
- Preceded by: Michael Hopfner
- Succeeded by: riding dissolved
- Constituency: Cut Knife-Lloydminster
- In office 1995–1999
- Preceded by: first member
- Succeeded by: Milton Wakefield
- Constituency: Lloydminster

Personal details
- Born: 1940 Rama, Saskatchewan, Canada
- Died: February 6, 2023 (aged 82)
- Party: New Democrat

Violet Laverne Stanger (1940 – February 6, 2023) was a Canadian politician, who sat in the Legislative Assembly of Saskatchewan from 1991 to 1999. A member of the Saskatchewan New Democratic Party caucus, she represented the electoral district Cut Knife-Lloydminster from 1991 to 1995, and Lloydminster from 1995 to 1999.

Stanger was a supporter of Paul Dewar in the federal 2012 New Democratic Party leadership election, and of Trent Wotherspoon in the provincial 2013 Saskatchewan New Democratic Party leadership election. She died on February 6, 2023, at the age of 82.
