= William Roseland =

Canadian politician (1892–1946)

William Roseland (April 18, 1892 – 1946) was an American-born farmer and political figure in Saskatchewan. He represented Cut Knife from 1938 to 1944 in the Legislative Assembly of Saskatchewan as a Social Credit member.

He was born in Zumbrota, Minnesota, the son of Peter Roseland and Caroline Munson, was educated in St. Paul and came to Canada in 1906. He continued his education at Brandon College. In 1915, Roseland married a Miss Bennett. He served on the Lloydminster Hospital board, the council for the Rural Municipality of Britannia No. 502, and as a school treasurer and postmaster for the unincorporated community of Landrose; he reportedly formed the town's name by reversing his own. Roseland lived in Marshall, Saskatchewan.
