= Regina—Lewvan =

Federal electoral district in Saskatchewan, Canada

Saskatchewan electoral district
- Interactive map of riding boundaries from the 2025 federal election

Federal electoral district
- Legislature: House of Commons
MP
Warren Steinley
Conservative
- District created: 2013
- First contested: 2015
- Last contested: 2025
- District webpage: profile, map

Demographics
- Population (2011): 79,587
- Electors (2011): 61,879
- Area (km²): 58
- Pop. density (per km²): 1,372.2
- Census division: Division No. 6
- Census subdivision: Regina (part)

Regina—Lewvan is a federal riding in Saskatchewan, made up of parts of the former Palliser and Regina—Lumsden—Lake Centre ridings within the city limits of Regina.

== History ==
Regina—Lewvan was created in the 2012 federal electoral boundaries redistribution and legally defined in the 2013 representation order. It was first contested in the 2015 Canadian federal election, held on 19 October 2015.

=== Historical boundaries ===
2013 representation order

2023 representation order

== Demographics ==
Panethnic groups in Regina—Lewvan (2011−2021)
| Panethnic group | 2021 | | 2016 | | 2011 | |
| Panethnic group | Pop. | % | Pop. | % | Pop. | % |
|---|---|---|---|---|---|---|
| European (Note: Statistic includes all persons that did not make up part of a visible minority or an indigenous identity.) | 65,700 | 67.38% | 68,510 | 75.12% | 64,980 | 82.82% |
| South Asian | 8,810 | 9.03% | 5,260 | 5.77% | 1,980 | 2.52% |
| Indigenous | 8,350 | 8.56% | 6,970 | 7.64% | 5,830 | 7.43% |
| Southeast Asian (Note: Statistic includes total responses of "Filipino" and "Southeast Asian" under visible minority section on census.) | 6,765 | 6.94% | 4,490 | 4.92% | 2,375 | 3.03% |
| African | 3,785 | 3.88% | 2,090 | 2.29% | 1,165 | 1.48% |
| East Asian (Note: Statistic includes total responses of "Chinese", "Korean", and "Japanese" under visible minority section on census.) | 2,130 | 2.18% | 2,030 | 2.23% | 1,070 | 1.36% |
| Middle Eastern (Note: Statistic includes total responses of "West Asian" and "Arab" under visible minority section on census.) | 795 | 0.82% | 945 | 1.04% | 350 | 0.45% |
| Latin American | 595 | 0.61% | 525 | 0.58% | 450 | 0.57% |
| Other/multiracial (Note: Statistic includes total responses of "Visible minority, n.i.e." and "Multiple visible minorities" under visible minority section on census.) | 585 | 0.6% | 385 | 0.42% | 230 | 0.29% |
| Total responses | 97,510 | 99% | 91,195 | 98.67% | 78,460 | 98.58% |
| Total population | 98,492 | 100% | 92,426 | 100% | 79,587 | 100% |
Notes: Totals greater than 100% due to multiple origin responses. Demographics based on 2012 Canadian federal electoral redistribution riding boundaries.

According to the 2016 Canadian census

Languages: 83.5% English, 2.4% Tagalog, 1.5% French, 1.2% Urdu, 1.2% Punjabi
Religions (2011): 69.3% Christian (30.9% Catholic, 12.1% United Church, 7.9% Lutheran, 3.7% Anglican, 2.1% Baptist, 1.9% Christian Orthodox, 1.0% Pentecostal 9.7% Other), 1.6% Muslim, 26.6% None.
Median income: $46,549 (2015)
Average income: $55,871 (2015)

== Members of Parliament ==
This riding has elected the following members of Parliament:

| Parliament | Years | Member | Party |
|---|---|---|---|
Regina—Lewvan; Riding created from Palliser and Regina—Lumsden—Lake Centre
| 42nd | 2015–2018 | Erin Weir | New Democratic |
| 42nd | 2018–2018 | Erin Weir | Independent |
| 42nd | 2018–2019 | Erin Weir | Co-operative Commonwealth |
| 43rd | 2019–2021 | Warren Steinley | Conservative |
| 44th | 2021–2025 | Warren Steinley | Conservative |
| 45th | 2025–present | Warren Steinley | Conservative |

== Election results ==
Graph of election results in Regina—Lewvan (minor parties that never got 2% of the vote or didn't run consistently are omitted)

=== 2023 representation order ===
2025 Canadian federal election
** Preliminary results — Not yet official **
| Party | Candidate | Votes | % | ±% | Expenditures |
|---|---|---|---|---|---|
| Conservative | Warren Steinley | 21,988 | 50.00 | +3.84 | |
| Liberal | Mac Hird | 18,881 | 42.94 | +28.64 | |
| New Democratic | Ray Aldinger | 2,573 | 5.85 | –28.96 | |
| Green | Michael Wright | 282 | 0.64 | –0.60 | |
| People's | Godwin Ezizor | 249 | 0.57 | –2.93 | |
| Total valid votes/expense limit | | | | | |
| Total rejected ballots | | | | | |
| Turnout | | 43,973 | 71.30 | | |
| Eligible voters | | 61,677 | | | |
| Conservative notional hold | | Swing | | –12.40 | |
Source: Elections Canada

2021 federal election redistributed results
| Party | Vote | % |
|---|---|---|
| Conservative | 18,497 | 46.16 |
| New Democratic | 13,950 | 34.81 |
| Liberal | 5,729 | 14.30 |
| People's | 1,401 | 3.50 |
| Green | 498 | 1.24 |

=== 2013 representation order ===
2021 Canadian federal election
| Party | Candidate | Votes | % | ±% | Expenditures |
|---|---|---|---|---|---|
| Conservative | Warren Steinley | 21,375 | 46.8 | -5.68 | $70,909.12 |
| New Democratic | Tria Donaldson | 15,763 | 34.5 | +5.89 | $86,148.83 |
| Liberal | Susan Cameron | 6,310 | 13.8 | +0.57 | $92,934.72 |
| People's | Roderick Kletchko | 1,635 | 3.6 | +2.49 | $1,751.64 |
| Green | Michael Wright | 560 | 1.2 | -2.87 | $5,827.19 |
| Total valid votes/expense limit | | 45,643 | 99.7 | – | $105,939.93 |
| Total rejected ballots | | 179 | 0.03 | -0.57 | |
| Turnout | | 45,822 | 67.06 | -8.45 | |
| Eligible voters | | 68,237 | | | |
| Conservative hold | | Swing | | -5.78 | |
Source: Elections Canada

2019 Canadian federal election
| Party | Candidate | Votes | % | ±% | Expenditures |
|---|---|---|---|---|---|
| Conservative | Warren Steinley | 27,088 | 52.48 | +17.55 | $75,743.62 |
| New Democratic | Jigar Patel | 14,767 | 28.61 | -6.60 | $58,571.02 |
| Liberal | Winter Fedyk | 6,826 | 13.23 | -14.25 | $27,612.69 |
| Green | Naomi Hunter | 2,099 | 4.07 | +2.31 | $5,891.53 |
| People's | Trevor Wowk | 573 | 1.11 | – | none listed |
| Independent | Don Morgan | 201 | 0.39 | – | none listed |
| National Citizens Alliance | Ian Bridges | 60 | 0.12 | – | none listed |
| Total valid votes/expense limit | | 51,614 | 99.40 | | |
| Total rejected ballots | | 312 | 0.60 | +0.22 | |
| Turnout | | 51,926 | 75.51 | +0.86 | |
| Eligible voters | | 68,770 | | | |
| Conservative gain from New Democratic | | Swing | | +12.07 | |
Source: Elections Canada Canadian Broadcasting Corporation

2015 Canadian federal election
| Party | Candidate | Votes | % | ±% | Expenditures |
|---|---|---|---|---|---|
| New Democratic | Erin Weir | 16,843 | 35.21 | -9.97 | $92,223.66 |
| Conservative | Trent Fraser | 16,711 | 34.94 | -8.93 | $72,236.17 |
| Liberal | Louis Browne | 13,143 | 27.48 | +19.28 | $70,367.24 |
| Green | Tamela Friesen | 839 | 1.75 | -1.00 | $1,285.24 |
| Libertarian | Wojciech K. Dolata | 298 | 0.62 | – | $5,634.21 |
| Total valid votes/expense limit | | 47,834 | 99.62 | | $198,699.60 |
| Total rejected ballots | | 181 | 0.38 | – | |
| Turnout | | 48,015 | 77.64 | – | |
| Eligible voters | | 64,325 | | | |
| New Democratic notional hold | | Swing | | −0.52 | |
Source: Elections Canada

2011 federal election redistributed results
| Party | Vote | % |
|---|---|---|
| New Democratic | 17,400 | 45.18 |
| Conservative | 16,894 | 43.87 |
| Liberal | 3,157 | 8.20 |
| Green | 1,060 | 2.75 |

== See also ==
- List of Canadian electoral districts
- Historical federal electoral districts of Canada
