= Marshall, Saskatchewan =

Town in Saskatchewan, Canada

Marshall
- Town
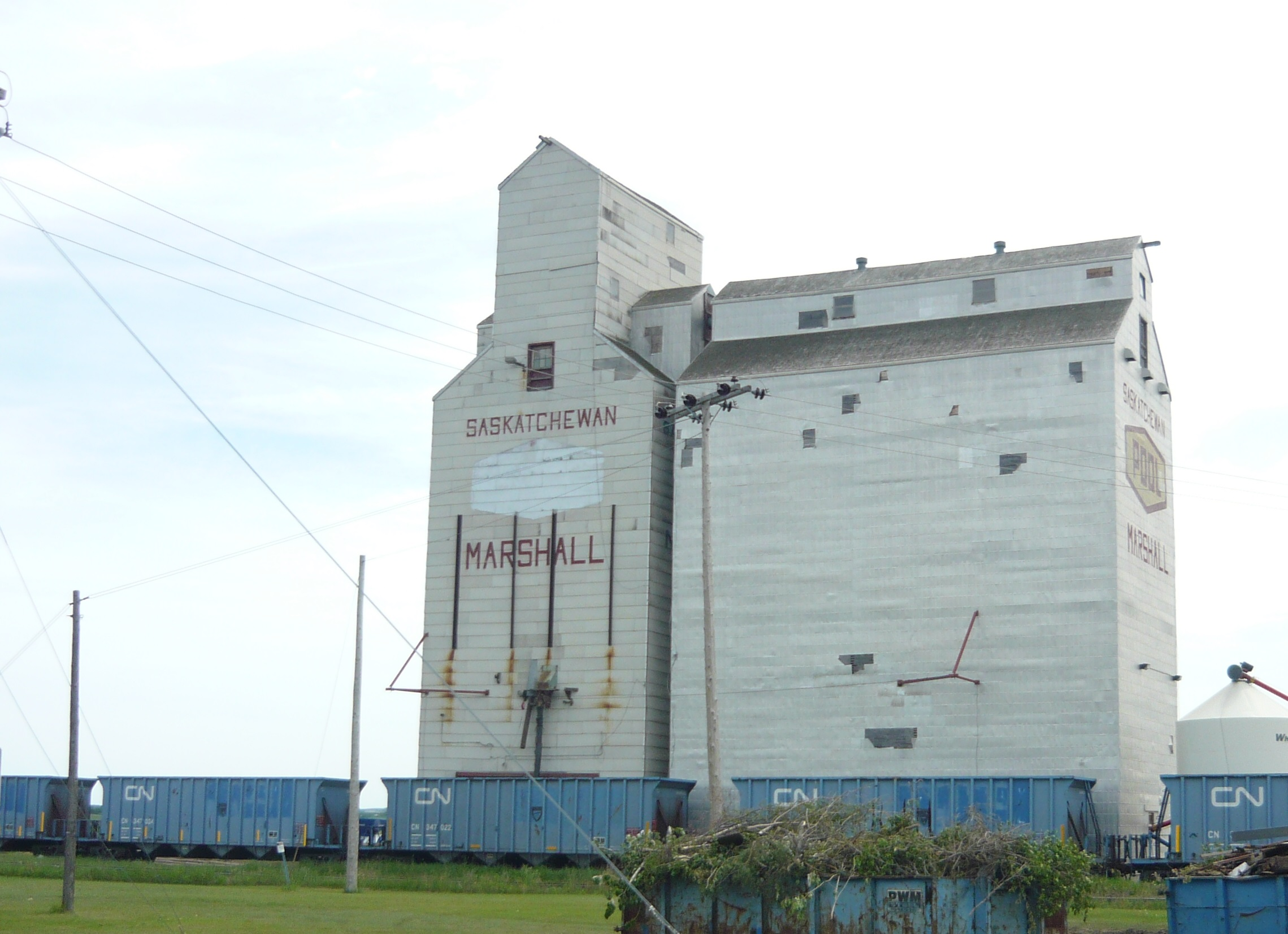
- Grain elevator

- Location of Marshall in Saskatchewan Marshall (Canada)
- Coordinates: 53.189°N 109.772°W
- Country: Canada
- Province: Saskatchewan
- Census division: 17
- Rural Municipality: Wilton
- Post office Founded: 1904

Government
  - Mayor: Darlene Puckey
  - Town Manager: Lorne Kachur
  - Governing body: Marshall Town Council
  - MLA Lloydminster: Colleen Young
  - MP Battlefords-Lloydminster: Gerry Ritz

Area
  - Total: 1.01 km^{2} (0.39 sq mi)

Population (2011)
  - Total: 533
  - Density: 527.7/km^{2} (1,367/sq mi)
- Time zone: UTC−7 (MST)
  - Summer (DST): UTC−6 (MDT)
- Postal code: S0M 1R0
- Area code: 306
- Highways: Highway 16
- Website: Official Website

Marshall is a town in Saskatchewan, Canada, 19 km (12 miles) from Lloydminster on Highway 16.

== Demographics ==
In the 2021 Census of Population conducted by Statistics Canada, Marshall had a population of 522 living in 198 of its 210 total private dwellings, a change of −11.7% from its 2016 population of 591. With a land area of 1.15 km^{2} (0.44 sq mi), it had a population density of 453.9/km^{2} (1,175.6/sq mi) in 2021.

== Notable people ==
Braden Holtby — NHL goaltender

== See also ==
- List of communities in Saskatchewan
- List of towns in Saskatchewan
