= Waseca, Saskatchewan =

Village in Saskatchewan, Canada

Waseca
- Village
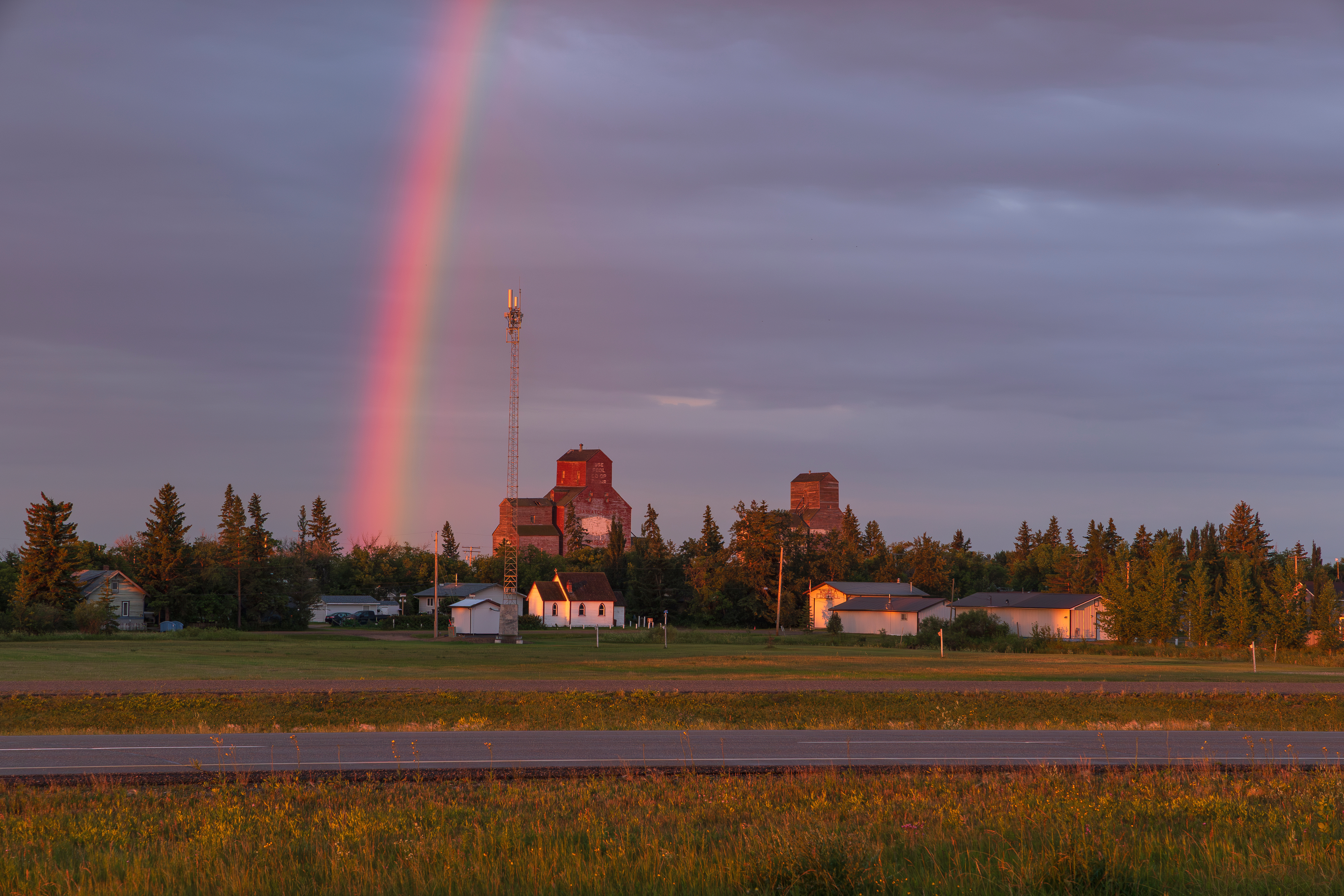
- Waseca in 2025

- Location within Saskatchewan Location within Canada
- Coordinates: 53°06′0″N 109°28′0″W
- Country: Canada
- Province: Saskatchewan
- Rural Municipality (RM): Eldon No. 471
- Post office founded: 1907-01-15

Government
  - Mayor: Rodney Weisner

Area
  - Total: 0.68 km^{2} (0.26 sq mi)
- Elevation: 642 m (2,106 ft)

Population (2021)
  - Total: 113
  - Density: 225.9/km^{2} (585/sq mi)
- Time zone: UTC−7 (MST)
  - Summer (DST): UTC−6 (MDT)
- Postal code: S0M 3A0
- Area code: 306

Waseca (2016 population: 149) is a village in the Canadian province of Saskatchewan within the Rural Municipality of Eldon No. 471 and Census Division No. 17. Waseca is located on Highway 16, the Yellowhead Highway, in the west central part of Saskatchewan. Waseca is located east of Lashburn and west of Maidstone.

== History ==
Waseca incorporated as a village on March 15, 1911. The village was probably named after Waseca, Minnesota. A former resident of the Waseca area (1923–1942) has stated she was told that Waseca was an Indigenous name meaning "looking upwards" and the name was assigned when the CN railway station was built.

== Demographics ==
Population history (1981–2016)
Year	Pop.	±%
1981	169	—
1986	190	+12.4%
1991	152	−20.0%
1996	153	+0.7%
2001	169	+10.5%
2006	144	−14.8%
2011	154	+6.9%
2016	149	−3.2%
Source: Statistics Canada via Saskatchewan Bureau of Statistics

In the 2021 Census of Population conducted by Statistics Canada, Waseca had a population of 113 living in 51 of its 66 total private dwellings, a change of −24.2% from its 2016 population of 149. With a land area of 0.65 km^{2} (0.25 sq mi), it had a population density of 173.8/km^{2} (450.3/sq mi) in 2021.

In the 2016 Census of Population, the Village of Waseca recorded a population of 149 living in 64 of its 75 total private dwellings, a −3.4% change from its 2011 population of 154. With a land area of 0.68 km^{2} (0.26 sq mi), it had a population density of 219.1/km^{2} (567.5/sq mi) in 2016.

== Climate ==
Climate data for Waseca
Month	Jan	Feb	Mar	Apr	May	Jun	Jul	Aug	Sep	Oct	Nov	Dec	Year
Record high °C (°F)	10 (50)	10 (50)	17.8 (64.0)	32.8 (91.0)	36.7 (98.1)	37.8 (100.0)	37.2 (99.0)	38 (100)	35 (95)	28.9 (84.0)	19.5 (67.1)	10.6 (51.1)	38 (100)
Mean daily maximum °C (°F)	−11.7 (10.9)	−7.7 (18.1)	−1 (30)	10.1 (50.2)	17.6 (63.7)	21.3 (70.3)	23.2 (73.8)	22.9 (73.2)	16.7 (62.1)	9.9 (49.8)	−2.5 (27.5)	−9.6 (14.7)	7.4 (45.3)
Daily mean °C (°F)	−16.4 (2.5)	−12.4 (9.7)	−6 (21)	4.1 (39.4)	10.8 (51.4)	14.9 (58.8)	16.8 (62.2)	16 (61)	10.5 (50.9)	4.1 (39.4)	−6.7 (19.9)	−14 (7)	1.8 (35.2)
Mean daily minimum °C (°F)	−21 (−6)	−17.2 (1.0)	−10.9 (12.4)	−2.1 (28.2)	4 (39)	8.4 (47.1)	10.3 (50.5)	9.1 (48.4)	4.1 (39.4)	−1.7 (28.9)	−10.8 (12.6)	−18.5 (−1.3)	−3.9 (25.0)
Record low °C (°F)	−50 (−58)	−48.3 (−54.9)	−40 (−40)	−30 (−22)	−10.6 (12.9)	−7.8 (18.0)	−3.9 (25.0)	−3.3 (26.1)	−13.3 (8.1)	−25 (−13)	−35 (−31)	−45.6 (−50.1)	−50 (−58)
Average precipitation mm (inches)	20.4 (0.80)	11.9 (0.47)	21.3 (0.84)	27.9 (1.10)	40.1 (1.58)	73.3 (2.89)	80 (3.1)	57.2 (2.25)	35.2 (1.39)	17.2 (0.68)	19.9 (0.78)	20.8 (0.82)	424.9 (16.73)
Source: Environment Canada

== See also ==
- List of communities in Saskatchewan
- List of villages in Saskatchewan
