= Ryan Domotor =

Canadian politician

Member of the Saskatchewan Legislative Assembly for Cut Knife-Turtleford
- In office October 26, 2020 – October 1, 2024
- Preceded by: Larry Doke
- Succeeded by: James Thorsteinson

Personal details
- Born: 1966 or 1967 (age 58–59)
- Party: Independent (2023-present)
- Other political affiliations: Saskatchewan Party (before 2023)

Ryan Domotor (born 1966 or 1967) is a Canadian politician, who was elected to the Legislative Assembly of Saskatchewan in the 2020 Saskatchewan general election. He represented the electoral district of Cut Knife-Turtleford as a member of the Saskatchewan Party until 2023 and latterly as an independent until 2024.

Domotor was ejected from the Saskatchewan Party caucus and stripped of all committee appointments on November 17, 2023, after he was charged with communicating for the purposes of obtaining sexual services.

Regina Police Service told the Saskatoon StarPhoenix newspaper that Domotor was arrested on the afternoon of November 16, 2023 at a business. The charges stemmed from an investigation into sexual exploitation and human trafficking that led to the arrests of 16 people.
