= Michael Hopfner =

Canadian hotel owner, electrical contractor, and politician

Member of the Legislative Assembly of Saskatchewan
- In office 1982–1991
- Preceded by: Robert Gavin Long
- Succeeded by: Violet Stanger
- Constituency: Cut Knife-Lloydminster

Personal details
- Born: January 25, 1947 Humboldt, Saskatchewan, Canada
- Died: April 19, 2009 (aged 62)
- Party: Progressive Conservative Party of Saskatchewan
- Occupation: hotel owner, contractor

Michael Alfred Hopfner (January 25, 1947 – April 19, 2009) was a Canadian politician in the province of Saskatchewan. He represented Cut Knife-Lloydminster from 1982 to 1991 in the Legislative Assembly of Saskatchewan as a Progressive Conservative. He was a hotel owner and electrical contractor by profession.

He was born in Humboldt, Saskatchewan, in 1947 and was educated in Lake Lenore and at the Moose Jaw technical school. He served on the town council for Lashburn, also serving as mayor. Hopfner served as government whip in the assembly. He was defeated by Violet Stanger when he ran for reelection in 1991.

Hopfner was found guilty of fraud in for his actions in the Saskatchewan Progressive Conservative scandal of the 1980s and was sentenced to 18 months in jail and ordered to pay $56,000 in restitution. He died on April 19, 2009.
