= Regina Walsh Acres =

Provincial electoral district in Saskatchewan, Canada

Saskatchewan electoral district
- Coordinates: 50.483°N 104.658°W

Provincial electoral district
- Legislature: Legislative Assembly of Saskatchewan
MLA
Jared Clarke
New Democratic
- District created: 2003
- First contested: 2003
- Last contested: 2024

Demographics
- Electors: 9,382
- Census division: Division No. 6
- Census subdivision: Regina

Regina Walsh Acres is a provincial electoral district for the Legislative Assembly of Saskatchewan, Canada. Originally created for the 16th Saskatchewan general election in 1967 from parts of Regina North and Regina West, this constituency has changed boundaries many times.

This district currently includes the Regina neighbourhoods of Normanview, Regent Park, Sherwood-McCarthy, McCarthy Park, and Walsh Acres. It will gain portions of Coronation Park and Argyle Park west of Argyle Street for the next general election.

The riding was created prior to the 2003 election from parts of Regina Sherwood, Regina Coronation Park, Regina Elphinstone, and Regina Qu'Appelle Valley.

== Members of the Legislative Assembly ==
Legislature	Years	Member	Party
Regina Walsh Acres
25th	2003–2007	Sandra Morin	New Democrat
26th	2007–2011	Sandra Morin	New Democrat
27th	2011–2016	Warren Steinley	Saskatchewan Party
28th	2016–2019	Warren Steinley	Saskatchewan Party
28th	2019–2020	Vacant
29th	2020–2023	Derek Meyers	Saskatchewan Party
29th	2023–2024	Jared Clarke	New Democrat
30th	2024–present	Jared Clarke	New Democrat

== Election results ==
2024 Saskatchewan general election
Party	Candidate	Votes	%	±%
New Democratic	Jared Clarke	4,700	56.99	+10.75
Saskatchewan	Liaqat Ali	3,073	37.26	–12.24
Saskatchewan United	Bonnie Farrell	352	4.27	–
Green	Dianna Holigroski	122	1.48	+0.98
Total valid votes		8,247	99.42	
Total rejected ballots		48	0.58	+0.47
Turnout		8,295		
Eligible voters		–		
Source: Elections Saskatchewan

2020 provincial election redistributed results
Party	%
Saskatchewan	49.5
New Democratic	46.2
Green	0.5

Saskatchewan provincial by-election, 10 August 2023 Death of Derek Meyers
Party	Candidate	Votes	%	±%
New Democratic	Jared Clarke	2,535	54.66	+17.01
Saskatchewan	Nevin Markwart	1,842	39.72	-6.90
Progressive Conservative	Rose Buscholl	221	4.76	+0.84
Green	Joseph Reynolds	40	0.86	–
Total valid votes		4,638	99.89	
Total rejected ballots		5	0.11	–0.68
Turnout		4,643	39.42	–17.07
Eligible voters		11,777		
New Democratic gain		Swing		
Source: Elections Saskatchewan

2020 Saskatchewan general election
Party	Candidate	Votes	%	±%
Saskatchewan	Derek Meyers	3,148	46.62	-4.68
New Democratic	Kelly Hardy	2,542	37.65	-5.06
Independent	Sandra Morin	797	11.80	-
Progressive Conservative	Ken Grey	265	3.92	-
Total valid votes		6,752	99.21	
Total rejected ballots		54	0.79	+0.61
Turnout		6,806	56.49	-2.09
Eligible voters		12,048		
Saskatchewan hold		Swing		+0.19
Source: Elections Saskatchewan

2016 Saskatchewan general election
Party	Candidate	Votes	%	±%
Saskatchewan	Warren Steinley	3,575	51.30	-6.88
New Democratic	Gloria Patrick	2,976	42.70	+3.36
Liberal	Reina Sinclair	312	4.48	-
Green	Leonie Williams	106	1.52	-0.96
Total valid votes		6,969	99.81	
Total rejected ballots		13	0.19	-0.10
Turnout		6,982	58.58	-9.02
Eligible voters		11,919		
Saskatchewan hold		Swing		-5.12
Source: Elections Saskatchewan

2011 Saskatchewan general election
Party	Candidate	Votes	%	±%
Saskatchewan	Warren Steinley	3,679	58.18	-
New Democratic	Sandra Morin	2,488	39.34	-22.65
Green	Bart Soroka	157	2.48	-0.96
Total valid votes		6,324	99.72	
Total rejected ballots		18	0.28	-8.52
Turnout		6,342	67.60	-5.16
Eligible voters		9,382		
Saskatchewan gain from New Democratic		Swing		+40.41

2007 Saskatchewan general election
Party	Candidate	Votes	%	±%
New Democratic	Sandra Morin	3,942	61.99	-0.86
Liberal	Marie-France Magnin	2,198	34.57	+24.08
Green	Kelsey Pearson	219	3.44	+2.57
Saskatchewan	~~Dan Harder~~^{1}	-	-	-
Total valid votes		6,359	91.19	
Total rejected ballots		614	8.81	+8.72
Turnout		6,973	72.76	-0.30
Eligible voters		9,584		
New Democratic hold		Swing		-12.47

^{1} Dan Harder, the Saskatchewan Party candidate, withdrew his candidacy on October 27, 2007, after the party learned the details of a complaint of inappropriate conduct made against him by employees of Big Brothers of Regina in 2006 while he was executive director of the organization. See Brownlee, Karen (29 October 2007). "Sask. Party rejects Regina candidate". Regina Leader-Post. Archived from the original on 30 October 2007.

2003 Saskatchewan general election
Party	Candidate	Votes	%
New Democratic	Sandra Morin	4,594	62.85
Saskatchewan	Mike Shenher	1,693	23.16
Liberal	Perry Juttla	766	10.48
Independent	Lindy Kasperski^{1}	192	2.63
New Green	Nigel Taylor	64	0.88
Total valid votes		7,309	99.92
Total rejected ballots		6	0.08
Turnout		7,315	73.06
Eligible voters		10,013	

^{1} Lindy Kasperski was suspended from the 24th Assembly's NDP caucus after being charged with fraud. Following Kasperski's acquittal, he was offered reinstatement — but refused in the face of a difficult re-nomination fight in this constituency.

== See also ==
- List of Saskatchewan provincial electoral districts
- List of Saskatchewan general elections
- Canadian provincial electoral districts
