= James Thorsteinson =

Canadian politician

James Thorsteinson MLA

Member of the Saskatchewan Legislative Assembly for Cut Knife-Turtleford
- Incumbent
- Assumed office October 28, 2024
- Preceded by: Ryan Domotor

President of the Saskatchewan Party
- In office November 8, 2014 – March 18, 2023
- Preceded by: Gary Meschishnick
- Succeeded by: Derek Tallon (interim)

Personal details
- Party: Saskatchewan Party

James Thorsteinson is a Canadian politician who was elected to the Legislative Assembly of Saskatchewan in the 2024 general election, representing Cut Knife-Turtleford as a member of the Saskatchewan Party.

Prior to elected politics, Thorsteinson served as the President of the Saskatchewan Party from November 8, 2014 until March 18, 2023.
