= Rural Municipality of Eldon No. 471 =

Rural municipality in Saskatchewan, Canada

Eldon No. 471
- Rural municipality
- Rural Municipality of Eldon No. 471
- Location of the RM of Eldon No. 471 in Saskatchewan
- Coordinates: 53.318°N 109.396°W
- Country: Canada
- Province: Saskatchewan
- Census division: 17
- SARM division: 6
- Formed: December 13, 1909

Government
  - Reeve: Larry Lundquist
  - Governing body: RM of Eldon No. 471 Council
  - Administrator: Lee Torrance
  - Office location: Maidstone

Area (2016)
  - Land: 1,007.59 km^{2} (389.03 sq mi)

Population (2016)
  - Total: 750
  - Density: 0.7/km^{2} (1.8/sq mi)
- Time zone: CST
  - Summer (DST): CST
- Area codes: 306 and 639

The Rural Municipality of Eldon No. 471 (2016 population: 750) is a rural municipality (RM) in the Canadian province of Saskatchewan within Census Division No. 17 and SARM Division No. 6.

== History ==
The RM of Eldon No. 471 incorporated as a rural municipality on December 13, 1909. It was originally formed as Local Improvement District 24-5-3 on April 26, 1907.

== Geography ==
=== Communities and localities ===
The following urban municipalities are surrounded by the RM.

Towns

- Maidstone

Villages

- Waseca

== Silver Lake Regional Park ==
Silver Lake Regional Park (53.2284°N 109.2679°W) is in the RM of Eldon on the eastern part of Silver Lake. At over 105 ha (260 acres), the park has a campground with 128 campsites, a 9-hole golf course, beach, ball diamonds, mini golf, laundry facilities, hiking trails, and a picnic area. Access is from Highway 21, about 12 kilometres (7.5 mi)} north of Maidstone.

In 1961, a swimming area was established on Silver Lake. By 1963, there had a picnic area, playground, sports ground, and a concession. One year later, in 1964, it was established as a regional park. Since then, the park has expanded and added more amenities. At about 85 ha (210 acres), Silver Lake is a small lake that has its outflow into the neighbouring Big Gully Creek. In 1971, a dyke was built at the lake's outflow to stabilise water levels and improve the beach.

Silver Lake Golf Club is a 9-hole, par 36 course totalling 3,160 yards with grass greens. The clubhouse is licensed and serves food. There are also a pro shop and club and cart rentals.

== Demographics ==
Population history (1981–2016)
Year	Pop.	±%
1981	964	—
1986	1,010	+4.8%
1991	882	−12.7%
1996	838	−5.0%
2001	766	−8.6%
2006	750	−2.1%
2011	751	+0.1%
2016	750	−0.1%
Source: Statistics Canada via Saskatchewan Bureau of Statistics

In the 2021 Census of Population conducted by Statistics Canada, the RM of Eldon No. 471 had a population of 700 living in 277 of its 303 total private dwellings, a change of −6.7% from its 2016 population of 750. With a land area of 991.15 km^{2} (382.69 sq mi), it had a population density of 0.7/km^{2} (1.8/sq mi) in 2021.

In the 2016 Census of Population, the RM of Eldon No. 471 recorded a population of 750 living in 275 of its 314 total private dwellings, a −0.1% change from its 2011 population of 751. With a land area of 1,007.59 km^{2} (389.03 sq mi), it had a population density of 0.7/km^{2} (1.9/sq mi) in 2016.

== Government ==
The RM of Eldon No. 471 is governed by an elected municipal council and an appointed administrator that meets on the second Wednesday of every month. The reeve of the RM is Larry Lundquist while its administrator is Lee Torrance. The RM's office is located in Maidstone.
