= Larry Doke =

Canadian provincial politician

The Honourable Larry Doke ECS

Member of the Saskatchewan Legislative Assembly for Cut Knife-Turtleford
- In office November 7, 2011 – September 29, 2020
- Preceded by: Michael Chisholm
- Succeeded by: Ryan Domotor

Personal details
- Party: Saskatchewan Party

Larry Doke is a Canadian provincial politician, who served as the Member of the Legislative Assembly of Saskatchewan for the riding of Cut Knife-Turtleford from 2011 to 2020 as a member of the Saskatchewan Party. He was first elected in the 2011 election, and subsequently re-elected in the 2016 election. He did not run for re-election in the 2020 election.

== Electoral results ==
=== 2016 Saskatchewan general election ===
2016 Saskatchewan general election: Cut Knife-Turtleford
Party	Candidate	Votes	%	±%
Saskatchewan	Larry Doke	5,710	79.87%	+16.60%
New Democratic	Danica Lorer	950	13.29%	-20.05%
Liberal	Rod Gopher	252	3.52%	+0.13%
Progressive Conservative	Rick Cline	147	2.06%	+2.06%
Green	Tammy Fairley Saunders	90	1.26%	+1.26%
Total valid votes		–	100.0	
Eligible voters		–		
Saskatchewan hold		Swing		-
Source: Elections Saskatchewan, Global News.

=== 2011 Saskatchewan general election ===
2011 Saskatchewan general election: Cut Knife-Turtleford
Party	Candidate	Votes	%	±%
Saskatchewan	Larry Doke	3,977	63.27	+2.24
New Democratic	Bernadette Gopher	2,096	33.34	+1.89
Green	Vinessa Currie	213	3.39	+1.29
Total valid votes		6,286	100.0	
Saskatchewan hold		Swing		+0.18

== Cabinet positions ==
Saskatchewan provincial government of Brad Wall
Cabinet posts (2)
Predecessor	Office	Successor
Donna Harpauer	Minister of Government Relations; August 30, 2017–February 2, 2018	Warren Kaeding
Donna Harpauer	Minister of First Nations, Métis and Northern Affairs; August 30, 2017–February 2, 2018	Warren Kaeding
