= Sandra Morin =

Canadian politician

The Honourable Sandra Morin ECS

Member of the Saskatchewan Legislative Assembly for Regina Walsh Acres
- In office November 5, 2003 – October 10, 2011
- Preceded by: Lindy Kasperski
- Succeeded by: Warren Steinley

Personal details
- Party: New Democratic Party (until 2020)

Sandra Morin is a Canadian provincial politician. She served as the Saskatchewan New Democratic Party member of the Legislative Assembly of Saskatchewan for the constituency of Regina Walsh Acres from 2003 until 2011, and as Minister of Culture, Youth and Recreation in the government of Lorne Calvert from May 2007 until the government's defeat in the 2007 Saskatchewan general election. Morin herself lost her seat in the 2011 Saskatchewan general election to Saskatchewan Party candidate Warren Steinley. She chose not to run in the 2016 Saskatchewan general election because of her civilian position with the Royal Canadian Mounted Police.

Morin was nominated to run in Regina Walsh Acres in the 2020 Saskatchewan general election but her nomination was overturned when party leader Ryan Meili declined to endorse her candidacy in August 2020 due to findings of a "confidential vetting process". Morin subsequently announced that she would be running as an independent. However, she did not win the election.
