= Rural Municipality of Wilton No. 472 =

Rural municipality in Saskatchewan, Canada

Wilton No. 472
- Rural municipality
- Rural Municipality of Wilton No. 472
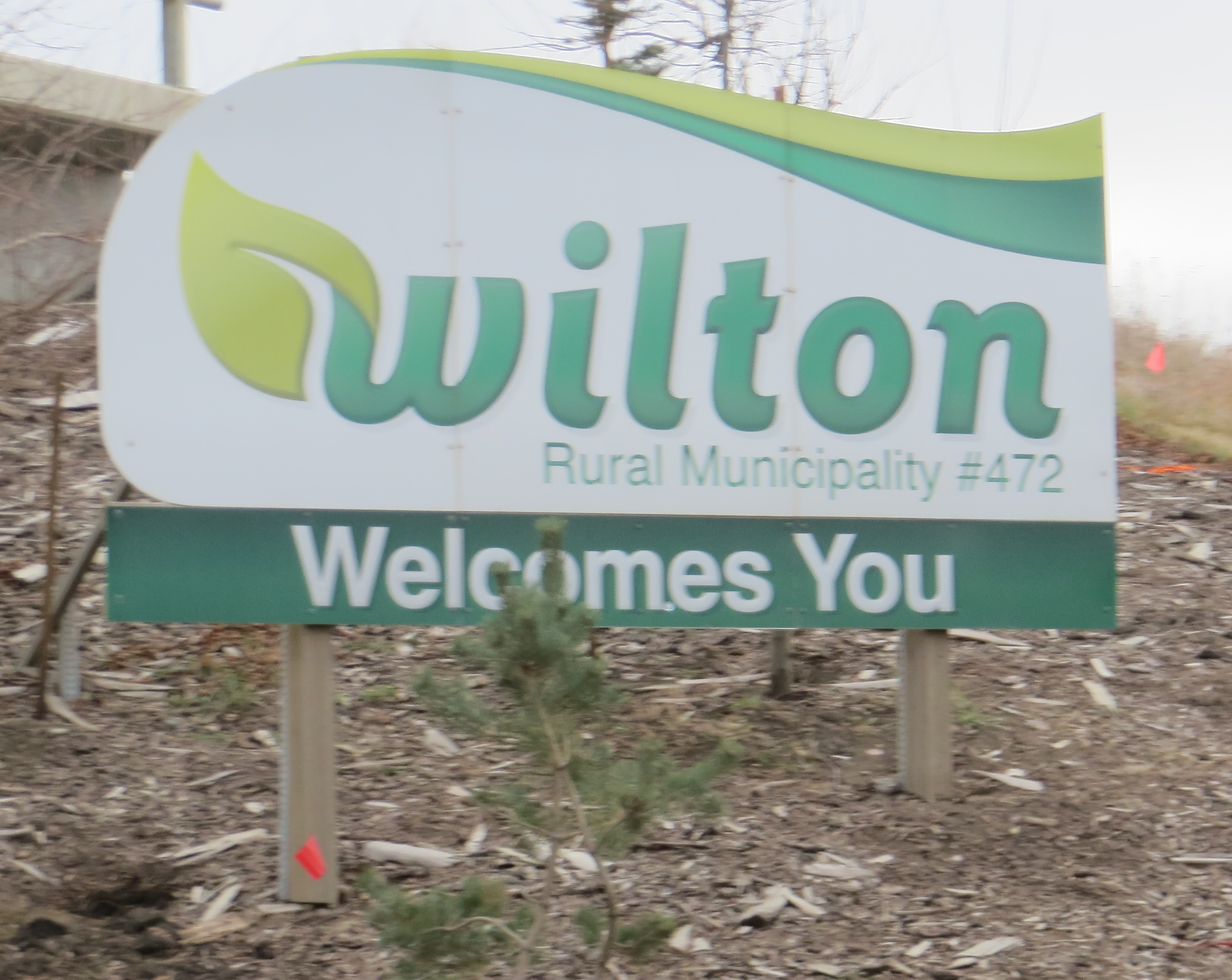
- Welcome sign

- Location of the RM of Wilton No. 472 in Saskatchewan
- Coordinates: 53.047°N 109.809°W
- Country: Canada
- Province: Saskatchewan
- Census division: 17
- SARM division: 6
- Formed: December 13, 1909

Government
  - Reeve: Glen Dow
  - Governing body: RM of Wilton No. 472 Council
  - Administrator: Darren Elder
  - Office location: Marshall

Area (2016)
  - Land: 1,041.27 km^{2} (402.04 sq mi)

Population (2016)
  - Total: 1,629
  - Density: 1.6/km^{2} (4.1/sq mi)
- Time zone: MST
  - Summer (DST): MST
- Area codes: 306 and 639
- Website: Official website

The Rural Municipality of Wilton No. 472 (2016 population: 1,629) is a rural municipality (RM) in the Canadian province of Saskatchewan within Census Division No. 17 and SARM Division No. 6. It is located in the west-central portion of the province.

== History ==
The RM of Wilton No. 472 incorporated as a rural municipality on December 13, 1909.

== Demographics ==
Population history (1981–2016)
Year	Pop.	±%
1981	1,884	—
1986	1,910	+1.4%
1991	1,651	−13.6%
1996	1,564	−5.3%
2001	1,560	−0.3%
2006	1,473	−5.6%
2011	1,494	+1.4%
2016	1,629	+9.0%
Source: Statistics Canada via Saskatchewan Bureau of Statistics

In the 2021 Census of Population conducted by Statistics Canada, the RM of Wilton No. 472 had a population of 1,473 living in 539 of its 595 total private dwellings, a change of −9.6% from its 2016 population of 1,629. With a land area of 1,022.9 km^{2} (394.9 sq mi), it had a population density of 1.4/km^{2} (3.7/sq mi) in 2021.

In the 2016 Census of Population, the RM of Wilton No. 472 recorded a population of 1,629 living in 589 of its 646 total private dwellings, a 9% change from its 2011 population of 1,494. With a land area of 1,041.27 km^{2} (402.04 sq mi), it had a population density of 1.6/km^{2} (4.1/sq mi) in 2016.

== Geography ==
=== Communities and localities ===
The following urban municipalities are surrounded by or adjacent to the RM.

Cities

- Lloydminster

Towns

- Lashburn

Villages

- Marshall

The following unincorporated communities are within the RM.

Organized hamlets

- Lone Rock

== Government ==
The RM of Wilton No. 472 is governed by an elected municipal council and an appointed administrator that meets on the third Thursday of every month. The reeve of the RM is Glen Dow. The RM's office is located in Marshall.

== See also ==
- List of rural municipalities in Saskatchewan
