= Cut Knife-Turtleford =

Provincial electoral district in Saskatchewan, Canada

Coordinates: 52°50′N 109°00′W

Saskatchewan electoral district

Provincial electoral district
- Legislature: Legislative Assembly of Saskatchewan
MLA
James Thorsteinson
Saskatchewan
- District created: 2002
- First contested: 2003
- Last contested: 2024

Demographics
- Electors: 8,363
- Census division(s): Division 12, 13, 17, 16

Cut Knife-Turtleford is a provincial electoral district for the Legislative Assembly of Saskatchewan, Canada. Located in northwest Saskatchewan, this constituency has an economy based primarily on farming — while oil and gas development is rising. The Battlefords Provincial Park is located here. Communities in the riding include the towns of Cut Knife (population 610), Maidstone (1,037), Lashburn (914), and Turtleford (461); and the villages of Neilburg, Meota, Glaslyn, Marsden, and Edam.

The riding was last contested in the 2024 general election. It sent Saskatchewan Party candidate James Thorsteinson to represent the district in the Legislature.

== History ==
This constituency was created by the Representation Act, 2002 (Saskatchewan) mostly from the former Battleford-Cut Knife riding, along with parts of Lloydminster and North Battleford. It was first contested in the 2003 general election and has seen only minor boundary changes since its formation.

Cut Knife-Turtleford has elected Saskatchewan Party members since its creation. It is considered a safe seat for the Saskatchewan Party, and typically returns members of that party with large majorities.

== Members of the Legislative Assembly ==
This riding has elected the following members of the Legislative Assembly:

Legislature	Years	Member	Party
Cut Knife-Turtleford; Riding created from Battleford-Cut Knife and Turtleford
25th	2003–2007	Michael Chisholm	Saskatchewan
26th	2007–2011	Michael Chisholm	Saskatchewan
27th	2011–2016	Larry Doke	Saskatchewan
28th	2016–2020	Larry Doke	Saskatchewan
29th	2020–2023	Ryan Domotor	Saskatchewan
29th	2023–2024	Ryan Domotor	Independent
30th	2024–present	James Thorsteinson	Saskatchewan

== Election results ==
2024 Saskatchewan general election
Party	Candidate	Votes	%	±%
Saskatchewan	James Thorsteinson	5,597	71.27	-5.13
New Democratic	Clayton Poole	1,536	19.56	+5.66
Saskatchewan United	Steve Gessner	566	7.21	
Green	Holly Ennis	154	1.96	+0.06
Total valid votes		7,853		
Total rejected ballots				
Turnout				
Eligible voters				
Saskatchewan hold		Swing		
Source: Elections Saskatchewan

2020 provincial election redistributed results
Party	%
Saskatchewan	76.4
New Democratic	13.9
Buffalo	7.8
Green	1.9

2020 Saskatchewan general election
Party	Candidate	Votes	%	±%
Saskatchewan	Ryan Domotor	5,517	76.91	-2.92
New Democratic	Matt Fedler	943	13.15	-0.11
Buffalo	Richard Nelson	572	7.97	–
Green	Patrick McNally	141	1.97	+0.72
Total valid votes		7,173	99.46	
Total rejected ballots		39	0.54	+0.09
Turnout		7,212	86.24	+28.28
Eligible voters		8,363		
Saskatchewan hold		Swing		–
Source: Elections Saskatchewan, Global News

2016 Saskatchewan general election
Party	Candidate	Votes	%	±%
Saskatchewan	Larry Doke	5,765	79.83	+16.56
New Democratic	Danica Lorer	958	13.26	–20.08
Liberal	Rod Gopher	255	3.53	-
Progressive Conservative	Rick Cline	154	2.13	–
Green	Tammy Fairley Saunders	90	1.25	–2.14
Total valid votes		7,222	99.55	
Total rejected ballots		33	0.45	–
Turnout		7,255	57.96	–
Eligible voters		12,538		
Saskatchewan hold		Swing		–
Source: Elections Saskatchewan, Global News

2011 Saskatchewan general election
Party	Candidate	Votes	%	±%
Saskatchewan	Larry Doke	3,977	63.27	+2.24
New Democratic	Bernadette Gopher	2,096	33.34	+1.89
Green	Vinessa Currie	213	3.39	+1.29
Total valid votes		6,286	100.0	
Saskatchewan hold		Swing		+0.18

2007 Saskatchewan general election
Party	Candidate	Votes	%	±%
Saskatchewan	Michael Chisholm	4,060	61.03	+12.55
New Democratic	Roger Emberley	2,092	31.45	–7.35
Liberal	Margaret MacGowan	294	4.42	–5.60
Green	Vinessa Currie	140	2.10	–
Western Independence	John Nesdoly	66	0.99	–1.71
Total valid votes		6,652	100.0	
Saskatchewan hold		Swing		+9.95

2003 Saskatchewan general election
Party	Candidate	Votes	%
Saskatchewan	Michael Chisholm	3,130	48.48
New Democratic	John Vinek	2,505	38.80
Liberal	Larry Ingram	647	10.02
Western Independence	Josiah Rise	174	2.70
Total valid votes		6,456	100.0
Saskatchewan pickup new district.			

== See also ==
- List of Saskatchewan provincial electoral districts
- List of Saskatchewan general elections
- Canadian provincial electoral districts
