= Warren Steinley =

Canadian politician (born 1981/82)

Warren Steinley MP
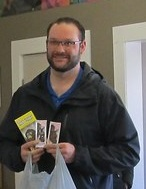

Member of Parliament for Regina—Lewvan
- Incumbent
- Assumed office October 21, 2019
- Preceded by: Erin Weir

Member of the Saskatchewan Legislative Assembly for Regina Walsh Acres
- In office November 7, 2011 – September 11, 2019
- Preceded by: Sandra Morin
- Succeeded by: Derek Meyers

Personal details
- Born: April 27, 1982 (age 44) Rush Lake, Saskatchewan, Canada
- Party: Conservative Party of Canada
- Other political affiliations: Saskatchewan Party
- Website: https://warrensteinley.com

Warren Steinley MP (born April 27, 1982) is a Canadian politician, who was elected Member of Parliament for the riding of Regina—Lewvan in the 2019 Canadian federal election. He represents the riding of Regina—Lewvan in the House of Commons as a Member of the Conservative Party.

Steinley serves as the Associate Shadow Minister for Agriculture, Agri-Food, and Food Security and he is also a member of the Standing Committee on Agriculture and Agri-Food.

== Early life ==
Warren grew up on a dairy and beef farm near Rush Lake, Saskatchewan. His family was very involved with the showing of Holstein cattle across Western Canada. The Steinley Brothers proudly exhibited animals as a family for decades, and the Park Lane prefix was a fixture on the dairy show circuits for decades.

Warren is a longtime athlete and sports enthusiast, and played competitive football, track and field, and hockey in his youth. Warren played in the Saskatchewan Senior Bowl for the top High School Graduating football players. After High School, He spent some time playing for the La Ronge Ice Wolves in the Saskatchewan Junior Hockey League.

== Education and career ==
Steinley graduated with an honours degree in political science from the University of Regina, where he competed for the University of Regina Cougars Track and Field team. He also co-founded the local Saskatchewan Party Campus Club. After University, Warren completed an internship with Hon. Gerry Ritz, the Minister of Agriculture in Ottawa and then worked in the office of Hon. Lynne Yelich, the Minister of Western Economic Diversification. Warren then returned to Saskatchewan in 2009 to work in the Saskatchewan Public Service within the Ministry of Executive Council as a Researcher. He served as the Director of Research within Government Caucus before being elected as an MLA in the 2011 Saskatchewan general election.

Steinley has been involved in numerous Saskatchewan Party and Conservative Party of Canada leadership races. He served as Andrew Scheer's Saskatchewan leadership campaign chair in 2017, and co-chaired Erin O'Toole's successful 2020 leadership bid.

== Member of Legislative Assembly ==
Steinley served as a Member of the Saskatchewan Legislative Assembly from 2011 to 2019 as the MLA for Regina Walsh-Acres. In addition to his duties as MLA, Steinley served as Deputy Caucus Chair, Chair of the Private Bills House Committee, member of the Standing Committee of Intergovernmental Affairs and Justice, and member of the Standing Committee of Human Services. Steinley was also a board member of Innovation Saskatchewan, the Provincial Capital Commission and served on the 2013 Grey Cup Executive Committee.

Steinley was succeeded as MLA in 2020 by Derek Meyers.

== 2019 federal election ==
Steinley resigned his provincial seat on September 11, 2019, the same day the Writs of election were issued for the 2019 Canadian federal election. Saskatchewan's Premier Scott Moe subsequently indicated that a by-election would not be held to fill the resulting vacancy in the Legislature. He argued that it was in order to save the by-election expenses, and due to the proximity to the upcoming 2020 Saskatchewan provincial election.

== Personal life ==
In 2009 Warren married his wife Larissa. They have three young children. In 2018, Steinley obtained a master's degree in Public Administration from the University of Regina through the Johnson Shoyama School of Public Policy. At the time of the 2025 Canadian federal election, he lived in Grand Coulee, Saskatchewan.

== Electoral record ==
=== Federal ===
2025 Canadian federal election: Regina—Lewvan
** Preliminary results — Not yet official **
Party	Candidate	Votes	%	±%	Expenditures
Conservative	Warren Steinley	21,988	50.00	+3.84	
Liberal	Mac Hird	18,881	42.94	+28.64	
New Democratic	Ray Aldinger	2,573	5.85	–28.96	
Green	Michael Wright	282	0.64	–0.60	
People's	Godwin Ezizor	249	0.57	–2.93	
Total valid votes/expense limit					
Total rejected ballots					
Turnout		43,973	71.30		
Eligible voters		61,677			
Conservative notional hold		Swing		–12.40	
Source: Elections Canada

2021 Canadian federal election: Regina—Lewvan
Party	Candidate	Votes	%	±%	Expenditures
Conservative	Warren Steinley	21,375	46.8	-5.68	$70,909.12
New Democratic	Tria Donaldson	15,763	34.5	+5.89	$86,148.83
Liberal	Susan Cameron	6,310	13.8	+0.57	$92,934.72
People's	Roderick Kletchko	1,635	3.6	+2.49	$1,751.64
Green	Michael Wright	560	1.2	-2.87	$5,827.19
Total valid votes/expense limit		45,643	99.7	–	$105,939.93
Total rejected ballots		179	0.03	-0.57	
Turnout		45,822	67.06	-8.45	
Eligible voters		68,237			
Conservative hold		Swing		-5.78	
Source: Elections Canada

2019 Canadian federal election: Regina—Lewvan
Party	Candidate	Votes	%	±%	Expenditures
Conservative	Warren Steinley	27,088	52.48	+17.55	$75,743.62
New Democratic	Jigar Patel	14,767	28.61	-6.60	$58,571.02
Liberal	Winter Fedyk	6,826	13.23	-14.25	$27,612.69
Green	Naomi Hunter	2,099	4.07	+2.31	$5,891.53
People's	Trevor Wowk	573	1.11	–	none listed
Independent	Don Morgan	201	0.39	–	none listed
National Citizens Alliance	Ian Bridges	60	0.12	–	none listed
Total valid votes/expense limit		51,614	99.40		
Total rejected ballots		312	0.60	+0.22	
Turnout		51,926	75.51	+0.86	
Eligible voters		68,770			
Conservative gain from New Democratic		Swing		+12.07	
Source: Elections Canada Canadian Broadcasting Corporation

=== Provincial ===
2016 Saskatchewan general election: Regina Walsh Acres
Party	Candidate	Votes	%	±%
Saskatchewan	Warren Steinley	3,575	51.30	-6.88
New Democratic	Gloria Patrick	2,976	42.70	+3.36
Liberal	Reina Sinclair	312	4.48	-
Green	Leonie Williams	106	1.52	-0.96
Total valid votes		6,969	99.81	
Total rejected ballots		13	0.19	-0.10
Turnout		6,982	58.58	-9.02
Saskatchewan hold		Swing		-5.12
Source: Elections Saskatchewan

2011 Saskatchewan general election: Regina Walsh Acres
Party	Candidate	Votes	%	±%
Saskatchewan	Warren Steinley	3,679	58.18	-
NDP	Sandra Morin	2,488	39.34	-22.65
Green	Bart Soroka	157	2.48	-0.96
Total valid votes		6,324	99.72	
Total rejected ballots		18	0.28	-8.52
Turnout		6,342	67.60	-5.16
Saskatchewan gain from New Democratic		Swing		+40.41
