= Maidstone, Saskatchewan =

Town in Saskatchewan, Canada

Maidstone
- Town
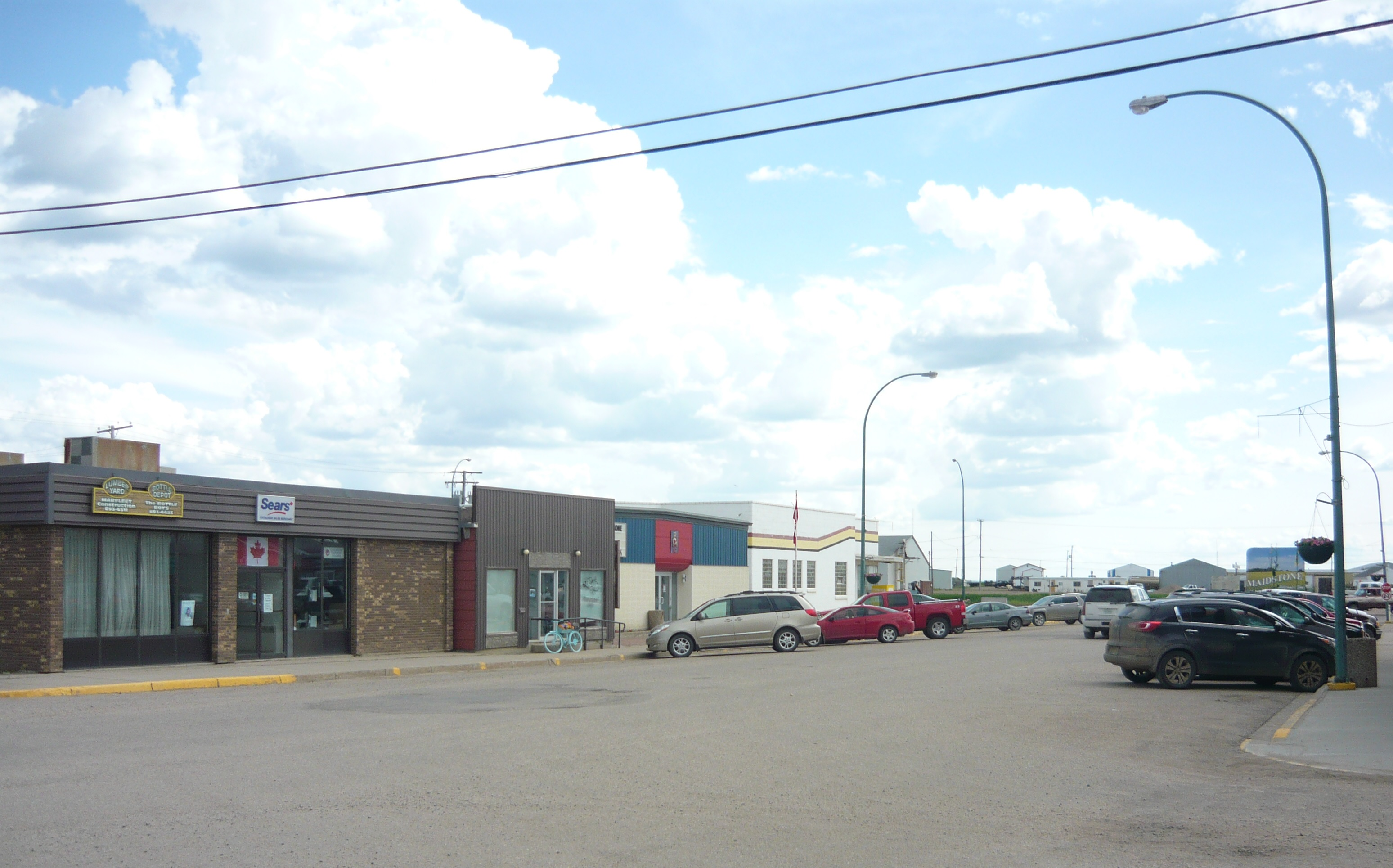
- Main Street

- Location of Maidstone in Saskatchewan Maidstone (Canada)
- Coordinates: 53.092°N 109.294°W
- Country: Canada
- Province: Saskatchewan
- Census division: 17
- Rural Municipality: Eldon
- Post office Founded: 1905 (as Sayers)

Government
  - Mayor: Brennan Becotte
  - Town Administrator: Amanda Flasch
  - Governing body: Maidstone Town Council
  - MLA Cut Knife-Turtleford: James Thorsteinson
  - MP Battlefords-Lloydminster: Rosemarie Falk

Area
  - Total: 4.39 km^{2} (1.69 sq mi)

Population (2021)
  - Total: 1,209
  - Density: 275.1/km^{2} (713/sq mi)
- Time zone: UTC−7 (MST)
  - Summer (DST): UTC−6 (MDT)
- Postal code: S0M 1M0
- Area code: 306
- Highways: Highway 16 / Highway 21
- Website: Official Website

Maidstone is a town in west central Saskatchewan, Canada about 57 km (35 miles) east of Lloydminster and 84 km (52 miles) west of North Battleford at the junction of Highway 16 and Highway 21. The community was named after Maidstone, Kent, England.

It is mentioned in Joni Mitchell's "Song For Sharon" from her Hejira album and is one of the places in western Canada in which she lived as a young child. The song's seventh verse begins: "When we were kids in Maidstone, Sharon/I went to every wedding in that little town/To see the tears and the kisses/And the pretty lady in the white lace wedding gown..."

== History ==
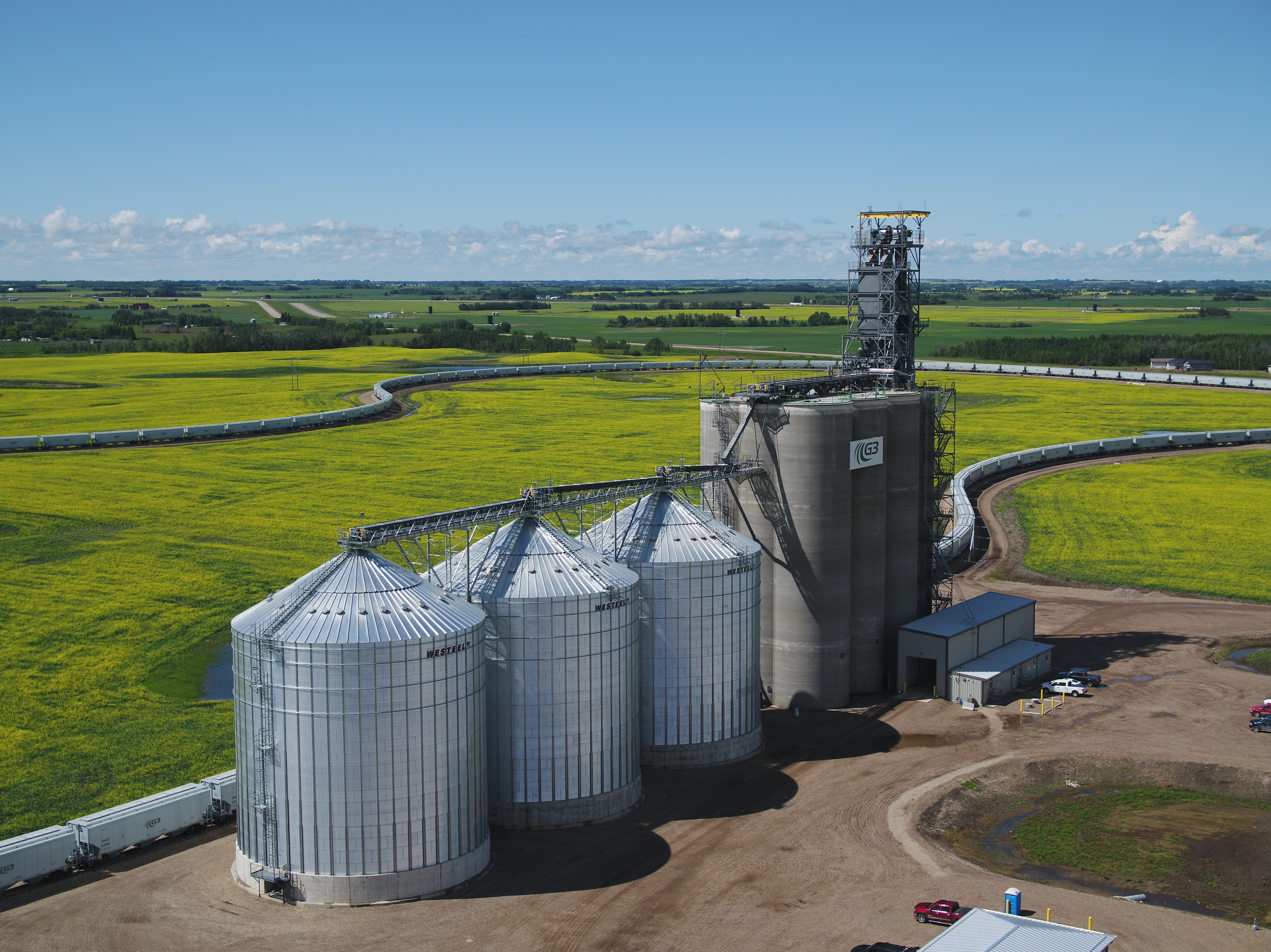
G3 Canada grain elevator at Maidstone, opened in 2019

In the spring of 1903, settlers began arriving in the Maidstone area, many of whom were Barr Colonists. These settlers would be followed by African American settlers from the U.S. and a significant number of Mennonites after the construction of the Canadian Northern Railway through the region in 1905. John Henry "Jack" Wesson settled in the area in 1907. He became one of Saskatchewan's foremost farm leaders and became the first president of the Canadian Federation of Agriculture in 1936 and the president of the Saskatchewan Wheat Pool in 1937.

In 1955 Maidstone officially became a town. Oil and gas development in the 1970s created conditions for growth in the community. The booming economy resulted in the town's population growing from less than 700 at the beginning of the decade to over 1,000 by 1981.

== Shiloh people ==
African Americans from Oklahoma settled in the Eldon district near Maidstone in 1909 creating the first and only African-American farming community in the province. In 1907 Oklahoma and the Indian Territory merged to become a State. The new government enacted segregation and laws disenfranchising African Americans. As a result, many decided to emigrate to Western Canada to take advantage of offers of free homesteads. About 10 or 12 families, led by Julius Caesar Lane and Joseph Mayes founded the Shiloh colony in the RM of Eldon. At its height in the late 1920s, the colony boasted between 50 and 75 African American families. Today, all that remains of the Shiloh community is a log building called Shiloh Baptist Church, built in 1911 and abandoned in 1940, as well as a graveyard known as the Shiloh Baptist Cemetery located about 29 km northeast of Maidstone. In 1991 the church and cemetery were designated a heritage property.

Charlow (Shiloh) Baptist Church located north of Maidstone in the RM of Eldon was built in 1912. It was founded by 12 African American families from Oklahoma in 1910.

== Demographics ==
In the 2021 Census of Population conducted by Statistics Canada, Maidstone had a population of 1,209 living in 462 of its 515 total private dwellings, a change of 2% from its 2016 population of 1,185. With a land area of 4.39 km^{2} (1.69 sq mi), it had a population density of 275.4/km^{2} (713.3/sq mi) in 2021.

Canada census – Maidstone community profile

	2021	2016	2011
Population	1,209 (+2.0% from 2016)	1,185 (2.5% from 2011)	1,156 (+11.5% from 2006)
Land area	4.39 km^{2} (1.69 sq mi)	4.56 km^{2} (1.76 sq mi)	4.56 km^{2} (1.76 sq mi)
Population density	275.1/km^{2} (713/sq mi)	259.8/km^{2} (673/sq mi)	253.5/km^{2} (657/sq mi)
Median age	39.6 (M: 37.2, F: 42.4)	36.2 (M: 36.0, F: 36.3)	36.2 (M: 37.3, F: 34.8)
Private dwellings	515 (total) 462 (occupied)	525 (total)	510 (total)
Median household income	$75,000

References: 2021 2016 2011

== Attractions ==
- CNR Station in Maidstone was built in 1905.
- Charlow (Shiloh) Baptist Church and Cemetery located north of Maidstone was built in 1912.
- Silver Lake Regional Park and Silver Lake Golf Club (9-hole golf course)
- Delfrari-Victoria Park where the Maidstone & District Museum is located.

== Transportation ==
The community is served by Maidstone Aerodrome which is located 1.2 NM (2.2 km; 1.4 mi) northwest.

== Sports ==
Maidstone is the home of the Maidstone Jets of the Saskatchewan Prairie Hockey League.

== See also ==
- List of communities in Saskatchewan
- List of towns in Saskatchewan
