= Lloydminster =

City in Alberta and Saskatchewan, Canada

- City
- City of Lloydminster
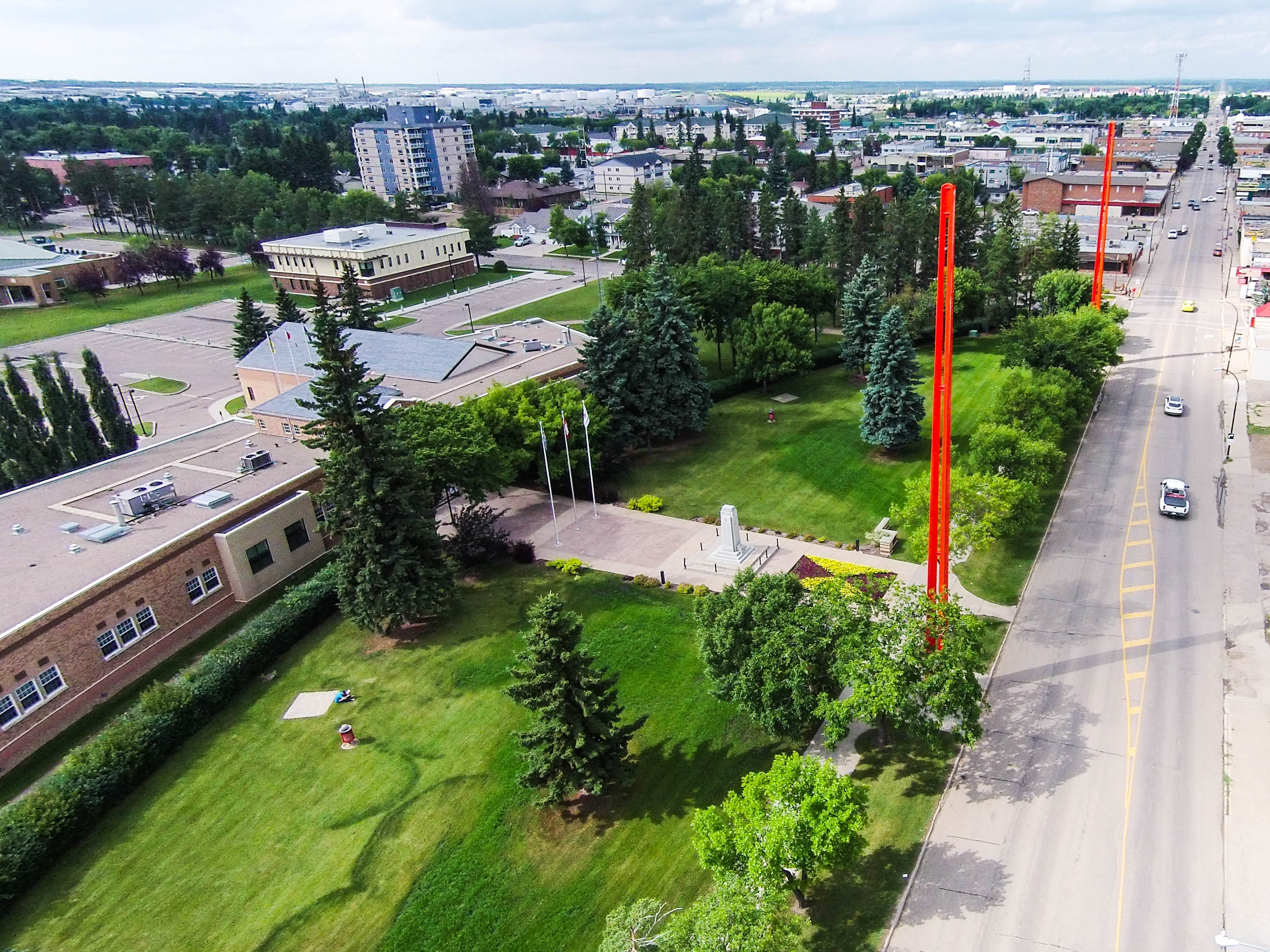
- An aerial view of Lloydminster City Hall looking north along the Alberta / Saskatchewan border

- Flag Logo
- Nicknames: "Border City" or "Canada's Border City", "Heavy Oil Capital of Canada"
- Boundaries of Lloydminster

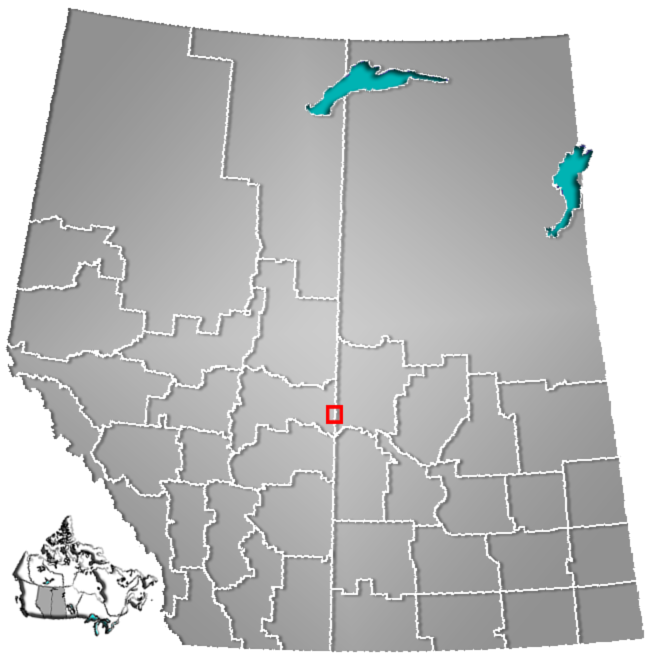
- Location in Alberta and Saskatchewan
- Coordinates: 53°16′41″N 110°00′00″W
- Country: Canada
- Provinces: Alberta (AB); Saskatchewan (SK)
- Regions: Central Alberta, West Central Saskatchewan
- Census divisions: 10 (AB), 17 (SK)
- Adjacent municipal district: County of Vermilion River
- Adjacent rural municipalities: RM of Wilton No. 472; RM of Britannia No. 502
- Incorporated
  - Village (SK): November 25, 1903
  - Village (AB): July 6, 1906
  - Town (SK): April 1, 1907
  - Amalgamation: May 22, 1930
  - City: January 1, 1958

Government
  - Mayor: Gerald Aalbers
  - Governing body: Lloydminster City Council: Jason Whiting; Lorelee Marin; David Lopez; Michael Diachuk; Jonathan Torresan; (one vacancy)
  - City Manager: Dion Pollard
  - MP: Shannon Stubbs (C); Rosemarie Falk (C)
  - MLA: Garth Rowswell (AB, UCP); Colleen Young (SK, SP)

Area (2021)
  - Land: 42.04 km^{2} (16.23 sq mi)
- Elevation: 645 m (2,116 ft)

Population (2021)
  - Total: 31,582; – 19,739 (AB); – 11,843 (SK)
  - Density: 751.2/km^{2} (1,946/sq mi)
  - Municipal census (2015): 31,377; – 19,740 (AB); – 11,637 (SK)
- Time zone: UTC−06:00 (CST, ABT)
- Forward sortation areas: T9V (AB), S9V (SK)
- Area codes: 780, 587, 825, 368 (AB); 306, 639 (SK)
- Website: lloydminster.ca

Lloydminster is a city in Alberta and Saskatchewan, Canada. The city is incorporated by both provinces as a single city with a single municipal administration.

== History ==
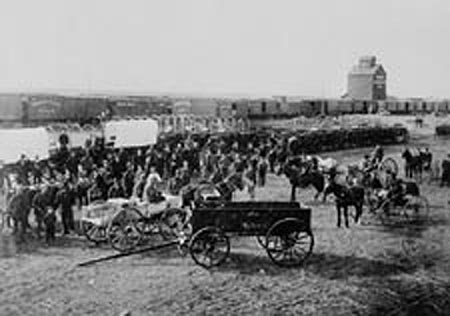
Barr colonists in 1903

Intended to be an exclusively British utopian settlement centred on the idea of sobriety, Lloydminster was founded in 1903 by the Barr Colonists, who came directly from the United Kingdom. At a time when the area was still part of the North-West Territories, the town was located astride the Fourth Meridian of the Dominion Land Survey. This meridian was intended to coincide with the 110° west longitude, although the imperfect surveying methods of the time led to the surveyed meridian being placed a few hundred metres (yards) west of this longitude.

The town was named for George Lloyd, an Anglican priest who would become Bishop of Saskatchewan in 1922. Lloyd was a strong opponent of non-British immigration to Canada. During a nearly disastrous immigration journey, which was badly planned and conducted, he distinguished himself with the colonists and replaced the Barr Colony's leader and namesake Isaac Montgomery Barr during the colonists' journey to the eventual townsite.

The town developed rapidly: by 1904, there was a telegraph office as well as a log church; in 1905, the Lloydminster Daily Times started publication and the first train arrived on July 28. Its main north–south street, today named Meridian Avenue (or 50th Avenue), along which stores, businesses and the post office began locating, was situated right on the Fourth Meridian, although the actual road right-of-way was located in Saskatchewan. To comply with temperance principles, alcohol was not available in Lloydminster for the first few years after its founding.

Beginning in 1900, calls for provincial autonomy in Western Canada grew, including from Frederick Haultain and James Hamilton Ross, two members of the Legislative Assembly of the North-West Territories. Haultain and Ross initially proposed that the districts of Alberta, Saskatchewan, Assiniboia, and Athabasca be merged to create one province. However, feeling that such a large province would be too large to administer, Parliament chose to create the two new provinces of Alberta and Saskatchewan in 1905.

When Alberta and Saskatchewan were created, the Fourth Meridian was selected as the border, bisecting the town right along its main street. Lloydminster residents petitioned for the new border to be revised so as to encompass the entire town within Saskatchewan, without success. Lloydminster functioned as two towns with separate municipal administrations until the provincial governments agreed in 1930 to amalgamate the towns into a single town under shared jurisdiction. The provinces, again jointly, reincorporated Lloydminster as a city in 1958.

Commemorating Lloydminster's distinctive bi-provincial status, a monument consisting of four 30-metre (100 ft) survey markers was erected in 1994 near the city's downtown core.

The majority of Lloydminster's population lived on the Saskatchewan side until recent decades; in the 2011 Canadian Census, nearly two-thirds of the city's population lived on the Alberta side. In 2000, the city hall and municipal offices were moved from Saskatchewan to an Alberta location on Meridian Avenue, also known as 50th Avenue, which runs along the Fourth Meridian.

Despite its bi-provincial status, Lloydminster was not exempted from anti-smoking legislation passed by the Legislative Assembly of Saskatchewan. Citizens responded by initiating a referendum against the wishes of the mayor, as permitted in the charter, which resulted in the enactment of a citywide anti-smoking bylaw. The matter became moot when Alberta enacted its own anti-smoking legislation, which was the solution that the mayor and council preferred.

== Geography ==
The provincial border runs north to south, falling directly on 50th Avenue (Meridian Avenue) in the centre of Lloydminster. Meridian Avenue north of the Yellowhead Highway (also named 44th Street) remains the main downtown street for stores, offices and businesses, with some also located on the intersecting east–west streets. Addresses east of 50th Avenue are considered to be in Lloydminster, Saskatchewan and addresses west of 50th Avenue are considered to be in Lloydminster, Alberta. The city is bordered by the County of Vermilion River, Alberta, on the west, the Rural Municipality (R.M.) of Britannia No. 502, Saskatchewan, on the northeast and the R.M. of Wilton No. 472, Saskatchewan, on the southeast. The majority of the large retail properties serving the city, including larger stores, gas stations and hotels, are located in its Alberta portion, in particular along the Yellowhead Highway west of Meridian Avenue and along the Alberta side of 50th Avenue south of the Yellowhead Highway.

Lloydminster's distinctive situation is reflected in other legal matters; the provincial line divides the city in two aspects related to communications. Telephones on the Saskatchewan side are assigned to area codes 306 and 639, the two area codes assigned to that province, while land lines on the Alberta side have numbers in the 780 and 587 area codes, the two area codes assigned to northern Alberta. Similarly, Saskatchewan addresses have a postal code with a forward sortation area designation (first three characters) of "S9V", and addresses in Alberta have postal codes beginning with "T9V". All postal codes in Canada beginning with the letter "S" are assigned to Saskatchewan, and those beginning with "T" belong to Alberta.

The city invoked an option in Saskatchewan's Time Act to opt out of the province's 1966 adoption of permanent Central Standard Time (CST, UTC−06:00), choosing to observe Mountain Time and daylight saving time with the rest of Alberta instead. This meant that clocks in Lloydminster only matched the rest of Saskatchewan during the summer months, as Mountain Daylight Time (MDT) has the same offset as CST. During the winter months, Lloydminster and Alberta were on Mountain Standard Time (MST UTC−07:00), putting it one hour behind Saskatchewan. In 2026, Alberta announced that it would adopt permanent DST as Alberta Time beginning November 1, 2026; Saskatchewan subsequently passed the Time Act, 2026 to place Lloydminster under permanent CST, meaning that time in Lloydminster would match Alberta and Saskatchewan year-round.

=== Climate ===
Lloydminster experiences a humid continental climate (Köppen climate classification Dfb), which approaches a subarctic climate (Köppen Dfc) due to May and September being only marginally above 10 °C (50 °F). Winters are long, cold and dry, while summers are short, warm and moderately wet. Year-round precipitation is fairly low, with an average of 408 mm (16.06 in), whilst the dry winters restrict snowfall to 98 cm (38.6 in).

The coldest temperature ever recorded was −50.0 °C (−58.0 °F) on 13 January 1911. The highest temperature ever recorded in Lloydminster was 38.1 °C (100.6 °F) on 12 July 2002. The record high daily minimum was 21.0 °C (69.8 °F) recorded July 10, 2001. The record highest dew point was 22.4 °C (72.3 °F) recorded July 28, 1987. The most humid month was July 2012 with an average dew point of 14.1 °C (57.4 °F). The warmest month was July 2007 with an average mean temperature of 20.6 °C (69.1 °F).

Climate data for Lloydminster Airport, 1991–2020 normals, extremes 1904–present (Note: Extreme high and low temperatures in the table are from Lloydminster (June 1904 to December 1970), Lloydminster North (January 1971 to June 1976), Lloydminster 12E (July 1976 to March 1982), and Lloydminster Airport (April 1982 to present).)
Month	Jan	Feb	Mar	Apr	May	Jun	Jul	Aug	Sep	Oct	Nov	Dec	Year
Record high humidex	10.4	8.2	18.6	27.1	34.7	39.0	42.5	38.9	34.0	26.5	17.8	9.5	42.5
Record high °C (°F)	10.6 (51.1)	13.5 (56.3)	18.6 (65.5)	32.8 (91.0)	36.7 (98.1)	37.8 (100.0)	38.1 (100.6)	37.4 (99.3)	33.0 (91.4)	28.9 (84.0)	19.5 (67.1)	10.0 (50.0)	38.1 (100.6)
Mean maximum °C (°F)	4.9 (40.8)	4.5 (40.1)	9.6 (49.3)	21.5 (70.7)	27.4 (81.3)	28.4 (83.1)	30.2 (86.4)	30.7 (87.3)	27.1 (80.8)	20.3 (68.5)	9.2 (48.6)	4.2 (39.6)	32.0 (89.6)
Mean daily maximum °C (°F)	−9.8 (14.4)	−7.3 (18.9)	−1.5 (29.3)	9.0 (48.2)	17.0 (62.6)	20.6 (69.1)	23.2 (73.8)	22.5 (72.5)	17.2 (63.0)	8.6 (47.5)	−1.8 (28.8)	−8 (18)	7.5 (45.5)
Daily mean °C (°F)	−14.3 (6.3)	−12.1 (10.2)	−6.1 (21.0)	3.2 (37.8)	10.3 (50.5)	14.7 (58.5)	17.2 (63.0)	16.2 (61.2)	11.0 (51.8)	3.2 (37.8)	−5.9 (21.4)	−12.3 (9.9)	2.1 (35.8)
Mean daily minimum °C (°F)	−18.8 (−1.8)	−16.8 (1.8)	−10.8 (12.6)	−2.6 (27.3)	3.6 (38.5)	8.7 (47.7)	11.1 (52.0)	9.8 (49.6)	4.6 (40.3)	−2.1 (28.2)	−10 (14)	−16.6 (2.1)	−3.3 (26.1)
Mean minimum °C (°F)	−33.6 (−28.5)	−29.2 (−20.6)	−25.5 (−13.9)	−11.8 (10.8)	−3.8 (25.2)	2.8 (37.0)	5.8 (42.4)	3.5 (38.3)	−3.6 (25.5)	−11.3 (11.7)	−21.6 (−6.9)	−29.5 (−21.1)	−35.8 (−32.4)
Record low °C (°F)	−50 (−58)	−48.3 (−54.9)	−36.7 (−34.1)	−28.9 (−20.0)	−16.7 (1.9)	−6.7 (19.9)	−3.3 (26.1)	−5 (23)	−13.9 (7.0)	−24 (−11)	−34.4 (−29.9)	−46.7 (−52.1)	−50 (−58)
Record low wind chill	−54.6	−54.5	−49.8	−36.7	−15.7	−4.9	0.0	−6.1	−14.7	−35.8	−50.9	−54	−54.6
Average precipitation mm (inches)	17.7 (0.70)	11.5 (0.45)	15.0 (0.59)	31.6 (1.24)	45.3 (1.78)	82.5 (3.25)	76.7 (3.02)	58.9 (2.32)	34.2 (1.35)	19.0 (0.75)	17.1 (0.67)	14.7 (0.58)	424.2 (16.70)
Average rainfall mm (inches)	0.7 (0.03)	0.4 (0.02)	1.7 (0.07)	14.8 (0.58)	41.2 (1.62)	82.5 (3.25)	76.7 (3.02)	58.8 (2.31)	33.7 (1.33)	12.9 (0.51)	1.5 (0.06)	0.2 (0.01)	324.9 (12.79)
Average snowfall cm (inches)	18.2 (7.2)	11.6 (4.6)	14.0 (5.5)	16.7 (6.6)	3.8 (1.5)	0.0 (0.0)	0.0 (0.0)	0.1 (0.0)	0.6 (0.2)	6.3 (2.5)	16.3 (6.4)	15.4 (6.1)	102.9 (40.5)
Average precipitation days (≥ 0.2 mm)	10.0	8.2	7.8	8.1	9.8	14.0	12.9	9.6	8.3	7.1	9.0	9.7	114.2
Average rainy days (≥ 0.2 mm)	0.55	0.38	1.1	4.7	9.3	14.0	12.9	9.6	8.2	5.2	1.2	0.37	67.4
Average snowy days (≥ 0.2 cm)	9.6	8.1	7.0	4.7	1.3	0.04	0.0	0.04	0.38	2.8	8.3	9.6	51.9
Average relative humidity (%)	74.3	72.1	66.7	48.3	40.7	50.0	53.7	50.1	49.7	55.9	73.3	75.6	59.2
Average dew point °C (°F)	−17.0 (1.4)	−15.1 (4.8)	−9.8 (14.4)	−3.9 (25.0)	1.0 (33.8)	7.8 (46.0)	11.5 (52.7)	9.9 (49.8)	4.4 (39.9)	−2.1 (28.2)	−8.8 (16.2)	−15.1 (4.8)	−3.1 (26.4)
Source 1: Environment and Climate Change Canada
Source 2: weatherstats.ca (for dewpoint and monthly&yearly average absolute maximum&minimum temperature)

== Demographics ==
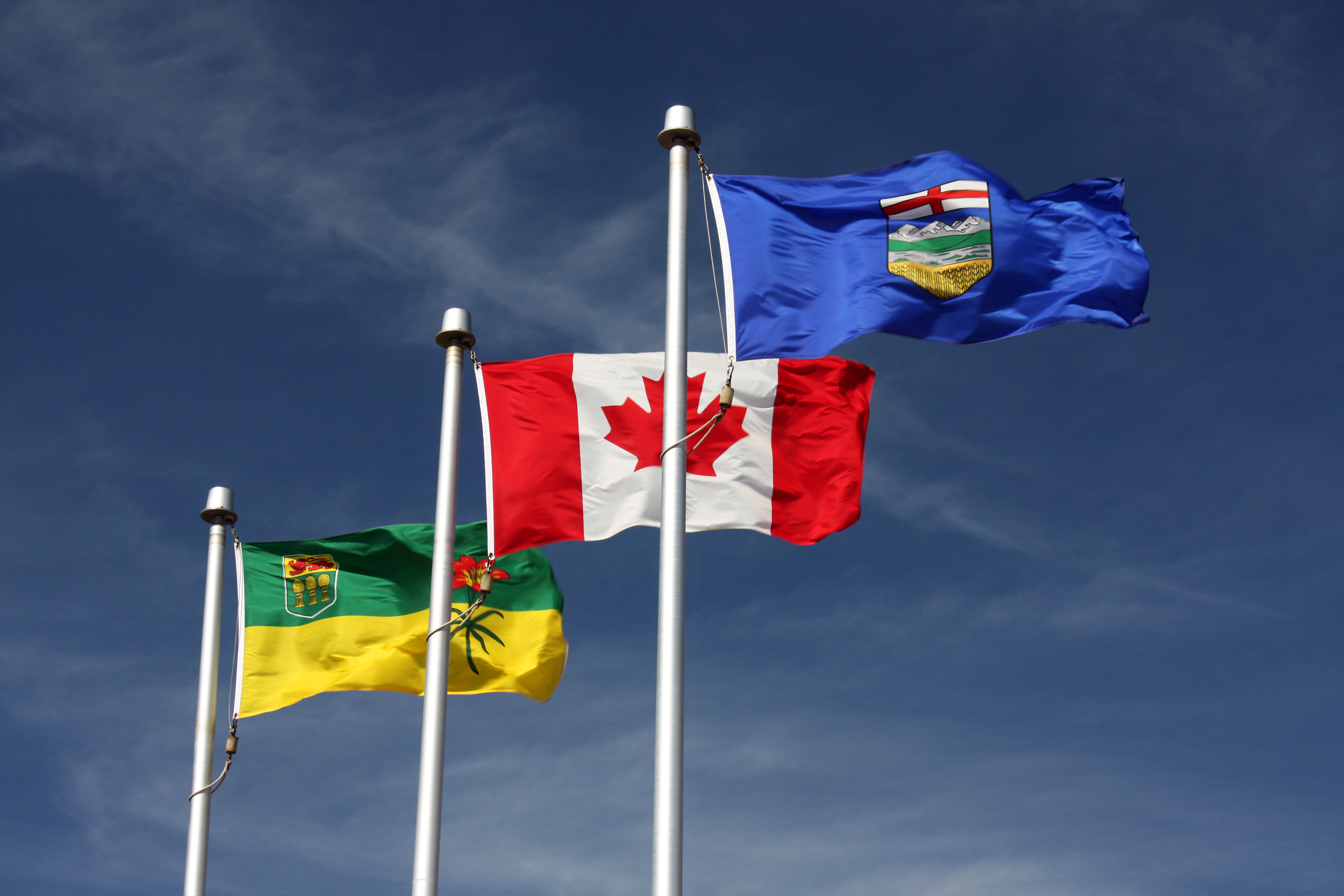
The flags of Saskatchewan and Alberta flanking the flag of Canada in Lloydminster

Federal census population history
Year	Pop.	±%
1906	519	—
1911	663	+27.7%
1916	788	+18.9%
1921	755	−4.2%
1926	1,247	+65.2%
1931	1,516	+21.6%
1936	1,420	−6.3%
1941	1,624	+14.4%
1946	1,833	+12.9%
1951	3,938	+114.8%
1956	5,077	+28.9%
1961	5,667	+11.6%
1966	7,071	+24.8%
1971	8,691	+22.9%
1976	10,311	+18.6%
1981	15,031	+45.8%
1986	17,356	+15.5%
1991	17,283	−0.4%
1996	18,953	+9.7%
2001	20,988	+10.7%
2006	24,028	+14.5%
2011	27,804	+15.7%
2016	31,410	+13.0%
2021	31,582	+0.5%
Source: Statistics Canada

In the 2021 Census of Population conducted by Statistics Canada, the Alberta portion of the City of Lloydminster had a population of 19,739 living in 7,636 of its 8,530 total private dwellings, a change of 0.5% from its 2016 population of 19,645. With a land area of 23.98 km^{2} (9.26 sq mi), it had a population density of 823.1/km^{2} (2,131.9/sq mi) in 2021. The Saskatchewan portion of Lloydminster had a population of 11,843 living in 4,443 of its 5,002 total private dwellings, a change of 0.7% from its 2016 population of 11,765. With a land area of 18.06 km^{2} (6.97 sq mi), it had a population density of 655.8/km^{2} (1,698.4/sq mi) in 2016. Overall, the entire City of Lloydminster had a population of 31,582 living in 12,079 of its 13532 total private dwellings, a change of 0.5% from its 2016 population of 31,410. With a land area of 42.04 km^{2} (16.23 sq mi), it had a population density of 751.2/km^{2} (1,945.7/sq mi) in 2016.

In the 2016 Census of Population, the Alberta portion of the City of Lloydminster had a population of 19,645 living in 7,444 of its 8,444 total private dwellings, a change of 8.9% from its 2011 population of 18,032. With a land area of 24.04 km^{2} (9.28 sq mi), it had a population density of 817.2/km^{2} (2,116.5/sq mi) in 2016. Meanwhile, the Saskatchewan portion of Lloydminster had a population of 11,765 living in 4,392 of its 4,909 total private dwellings, a change of 20.4% from its 2011 population of 9,772. With a land area of 18.28 km^{2} (7.06 sq mi), it had a population density of 643.6/km^{2} (1,666.9/sq mi) in 2016. Overall, the entire City of Lloydminster had a population of 31,410 living in 11,836 of its 13,353 total private dwellings in the 2016 Census of Population, a change of 13% from its 2011 population of 27,804. With a land area of 42.32 km^{2} (16.34 sq mi), it had a population density of 742.2/km^{2} (1,922.3/sq mi) in 2016.

The City of Lloydminster's 2015 municipal census counted a population of 31,377, a change of −0.3% from its 2013 municipal census population of 31,483. Of the 31,377 residents, 19,740 (63%) lived on the Alberta side and 11,637 (37%) lived on the Saskatchewan side.

There are substantial demographic differences between the populations on each side of the border, with the population on the Saskatchewan side being substantially younger; the median age on the Saskatchewan side is 26.6, nearly seven years less than the median age of 33.2 on the Alberta side. Even when combining the median ages for both sides of the city, Lloydminster has the youngest median age in all of Canada. Also, the specific age group of 20–24 is much more concentrated on the Saskatchewan side. The two sides of the city have virtually identical numbers of people in that age group (1,220 in Saskatchewan, 1,230 in Alberta) even though the total population on the Alberta side is nearly twice that of the Saskatchewan side. This situation has been attributed in part to differential car insurance rates for drivers; because Saskatchewan has a public auto insurance system while Alberta relies on conventional private insurance, young drivers with the highest insurance rates can save thousands of dollars by living in Saskatchewan rather than Alberta.

The census agglomeration of Lloydminster includes both parts of the city, as well as the rural municipality of Wilton No. 472, the town of Lashburn, and the village of Marshall, Saskatchewan.

=== Language ===
About 94% of residents identified English as their first language. More than 1.4% of the population identified French as their first language, while 0.8% identified German, 0.7% identified Ukrainian, and 0.5% identified Cree as their first language learned. The next most common languages were Chinese and Spanish at about 0.3% each.

=== Ethnicity ===
More than 8% of residents identified themselves as aboriginal at the time of the 2006 census.

Panethnic groups in the City of Lloydminster (2001–2021)
Panethnic group	2021		2016		2011		2006		2001	
Panethnic group	Pop.	%	Pop.	%	Pop.	%	Pop.	%	Pop.	%
European (Note: Statistic includes all persons that did not make up part of a visible minority or an indigenous identity.)	21,470	69.28%	22,600	73.1%	23,400	85.51%	21,180	89.16%	18,130	87.52%
Indigenous	4,135	13.34%	3,320	10.74%	2,100	7.67%	1,980	8.34%	2,000	9.65%
Southeast Asian (Note: Statistic includes total responses of "Filipino" and "Southeast Asian" under visible minority section on census.)	3,370	10.87%	2,635	8.52%	1,005	3.67%	85	0.36%	250	1.21%
South Asian	1,005	3.24%	1,130	3.66%	330	1.21%	120	0.51%	105	0.51%
African	400	1.29%	510	1.65%	125	0.46%	70	0.29%	35	0.17%
East Asian (Note: Statistic includes total responses of "Chinese", "Korean", and "Japanese" under visible minority section on census.)	200	0.65%	240	0.78%	150	0.55%	160	0.67%	100	0.48%
Middle Eastern (Note: Statistic includes total responses of "West Asian" and "Arab" under visible minority section on census.)	150	0.48%	200	0.65%	30	0.11%	60	0.25%	60	0.29%
Latin American	130	0.42%	160	0.52%	165	0.6%	80	0.34%	30	0.14%
Other/multiracial (Note: Statistic includes total responses of "Visible minority, n.i.e." and "Multiple visible minorities" under visible minority section on census.)	105	0.34%	140	0.45%	40	0.15%	10	0.04%	20	0.1%
Total responses	30,990	98.13%	30,915	98.42%	27,365	98.42%	23,755	98.86%	20,715	98.7%
Total population	31,582	100%	31,410	100%	27,804	100%	24,028	100%	20,988	100%
Note: Totals greater than 100% due to multiple origin responses

=== Religion ===
More than 78% of residents identified as Christian at the time of the 2001 census, while over 18% indicated that they had no religious affiliation. For specific denominations Statistics Canada found that 31% of residents identified as Roman Catholic, and 44% Protestants of which, 18% identified with the United Church of Canada, more than 7% identified as Anglican, about 5% identified as Lutheran, almost 3% identified as Pentecostal, about 2% identified as Baptists, and just over 1% of the population identified as Eastern Orthodox.

== Economy ==
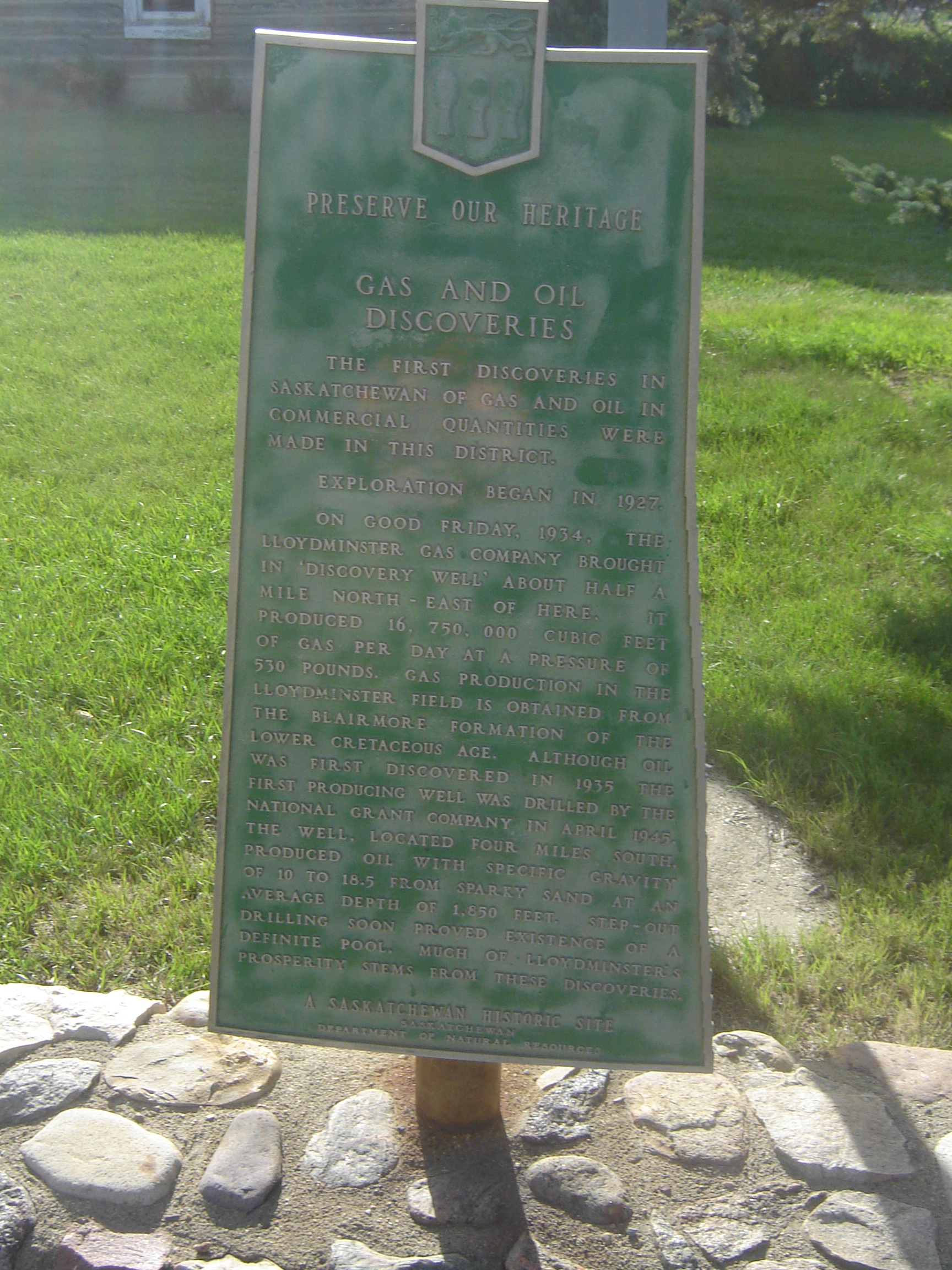
Oil and Gas plaque at the Barr Colony Heritage Cultural Centre

The local economy is driven primarily by the petroleum industry. Agriculture remains an important economic activity. The Husky Lloydminster Refinery is also located in the community. An issue in business is the sales tax. The only sales tax applicable in Alberta is the federal Goods and Services Tax (GST). Saskatchewan has, in addition to GST, a provincial sales tax (PST). To ensure that business will not float away from the Saskatchewan side in favour of lower prices in Alberta, PST does not apply in the Saskatchewan side of the city with the exception of hotels, vehicle registration and utility services.

== Government ==
Lloydminster is governed by a seven-member city council, consisting of a mayor and six city councillors. The city follows the Saskatchewan schedule when voting in municipal elections.

Residents on the Alberta side are in the electoral district of Lakeland for elections to the federal House of Commons, and Vermilion-Lloydminster-Wainwright for elections to the Legislative Assembly of Alberta. Residents in Saskatchewan are in Battlefords—Lloydminster federally, and Lloydminster for the Legislative Assembly of Saskatchewan.

=== Taxation ===
Lloydminster's bi-provincial status has resulted in special provisions regarding provincial taxation within the city limits. The Saskatchewan side of the city is exempt from that province's sales tax, preventing businesses located there from being placed at a disadvantage relative to businesses in Alberta, which has no provincial sales tax. There is no exemption for provincial income tax, which is based solely on the taxpayer's province of residence. Other differences surrounding interprovincial costs are reflected within the treatment of automobile insurance, and housing taxes. For example, a driver under age 25 who lives on the Alberta side will pay approximately 2–3 times the average amount required of a Saskatchewan driver of the same age.

== Infrastructure ==
=== Health care ===
Lloydminster relies on health care resources from both Alberta Health Services and the Saskatchewan Health Authority. The Lloydminster Hospital was constructed in 1987 on the Saskatchewan side of the border.

In 2013, an independent report found that Lloydminster was underserved by health care services in comparison to similar catchment areas in Alberta. In 2007, Lloydminster was deemed to have outgrown the capacity of its hospital; calls for more operating rooms, acute care beds, and a dedicated MRI unit did not come to fruition, resulting in patients sometimes having to travel to larger cities such as Saskatoon for operations. Due to health data privacy laws in both provinces, the Lloydminster Hospital does not have direct access to AHS patient records, which have led to Alberta-based patients sometimes bringing their own paper records or receiving diagnostic tests a second time.

The city's contracts with WPD to provide ambulance service in Lloydminster have faced criticism over unsatisfactory performance, with some patients having had to wait up to 40 minutes for help to arrive; in August 2021, AHS pulled out of the contract and signed with a different provider, but WPD invoked an arbitration clause in Saskatchewan law that has prevented the SHA from immediately exiting the contract.

=== Transportation ===
The city is served by Lloydminster Airport. The Yellowhead Highway (Alberta Highway 16 and Saskatchewan Highway 16) passes through the city from west to east, and Highway 17 (which is considered part of both Alberta's and Saskatchewan's highway system and is maintained by both provinces) travels along the provincial border from south to north. There is no local public transport serving the city.

== Education ==
Elementary and secondary schools on both sides of the border all use Saskatchewan's curriculum. Lloydminster provides public and catholic education up to grade 12 as well as post-secondary education through Lakeland College, offering one and two year certificate and diploma programs.

== Media ==
Newspapers

- Lloydminster Meridian Booster, serves Lloydminster and area, circulating to 15,000 homes. Published Monday, Wednesday and Friday each week.
- Lloydminster Source is a free weekly newspaper, distributed each Tuesday and Thursday.

Radio

Frequency	Call sign	Branding	Format	Owner	Notes
AM 540	CBK	CBC Radio One	Talk radio, public radio	Canadian Broadcasting Corporation	
FM 95.9	CKSA-FM	Real Country 95.9	Country music	Stingray Group	
FM 97.5	CKUA-FM-15	CKUA Radio	Variety, public radio	CKUA Radio Foundation	Rebroadcaster of CKUA-FM (Edmonton)
FM 98.9	CILR-FM	–	Tourist information	Stingray Group	
FM 106.1	CKLM-FM	106.1 The Goat	Active rock	Vista Radio	

Television

Lloydminster was served by two broadcast television stations, operated as part of a twinstick operation owned by Stingray Radio. Both stations ceased broadcasting on May 13, 2025.

OTA virtual channel (PSIP)	OTA channel	Call sign	Network	Notes
2.1	2 (VHF)	CKSA-DT	Citytv	Privately owned affiliate
4.1	4 (VHF)	CITL-DT	CTV	Privately owned affiliate

== Notable people ==
- Ron Adam – Canadian Football League (CFL) defensive back
- Colby Armstrong – National Hockey League (NHL) forward
- Calvin Ayre – founder of the online gambling company Bodog
- Garnet "Ace" Bailey – NHL forward and scout, died on United Airlines Flight 175
- Leon Benoit – Canadian politician
- Samuel Delbert Clark – sociologist
- Joan Crockatt – Canadian politician, journalist
- Cory Cross – NHL defenceman
- David Dziurzynski – NHL forward
- Rosemarie Falk – Canadian politician
- Scott Hartnell – NHL forward
- Braden Holtby – NHL goaltender
- Skip Krake – NHL forward who now lives in Lloydminster
- Clarke MacArthur – NHL forward
- Lucella MacLean – AAGPBL utility
- James Hanna McCormick – Northern Irish politician
- Keith Morrison – journalist, newscaster
- Wade Redden – NHL defenceman
- Richard Starke – Canadian politician
- James Till – biophysicist who helped demonstrate the existence of stem cells
- Lance Ward – NHL defenceman
- Tyler Weiman – NHL goaltender
- Colleen Young – Saskatchewan politician
- Tanner Novlan – actor

== See also ==
- Flin Flon, a town split between Manitoba and Saskatchewan
- List of communities in Alberta
- List of communities in Saskatchewan
- List of cities in Alberta
- List of cities in Saskatchewan
