= Derek Meyers =

Canadian politician (1977–2023)

Member of the Saskatchewan Legislative Assembly for Regina Walsh Acres
- In office October 26, 2020 – March 28, 2023
- Preceded by: Warren Steinley
- Succeeded by: Jared Clarke

Personal details
- Born: September 4, 1977
- Died: March 28, 2023 (aged 45) Regina, Saskatchewan, Canada
- Party: Saskatchewan Party

Derek Meyers (September 4, 1977 – March 28, 2023) was a Canadian politician, who was elected to the Legislative Assembly of Saskatchewan in the 2020 Saskatchewan general election. He represented the electoral district of Regina Walsh Acres as a member of the Saskatchewan Party. Meyers died of cancer on March 28, 2023, at the age of 45.
