= Colleen Young (politician) =

Canadian provincial politician

The Honourable Colleen Young ECS MLA

Member of the Saskatchewan Legislative Assembly for Lloydminster
- Incumbent
- Assumed office November 14, 2014
- Preceded by: Tim McMillan

Personal details
- Party: Saskatchewan Party

Colleen Young is a Canadian provincial politician who currently serves as the member of the Legislative Assembly of Saskatchewan for the district of Lloydminster. She was first elected in a by-election on November 14, 2014. She is a member of the Saskatchewan Party caucus. She was re-elected in the 2016 general election and 2020 general election. On May 20, 2024, Young was appointed to cabinet as Minister of Advanced Education.

Prior to her election to the legislature, Young was chair of the Lloydminster Public School Board, and served on the senate of the University of Saskatchewan.

== Electoral history ==
=== 2016 Saskatchewan general election ===
2016 Saskatchewan general election: Lloydminster
Party	Candidate	Votes	%	±%
Saskatchewan	Colleen Young	4,340	–	–
New Democratic	Michelle Oleksyn	410	–	–
Liberal	Dolores Pahtayken	191	–	–
Green	Lisa Grant	64	–	–
Total valid votes		–	100.0	
Eligible voters		–		
Saskatchewan hold		Swing		-
Source: Elections Saskatchewan, Global News.

=== 2014 Lloydminster provincial by-election ===
Saskatchewan provincial by-election, November 26, 2014 On the resignation of Tim McMillan
Party	Candidate	Votes	%	±%
Saskatchewan	Colleen Young	1,802	64.22	-2.20
New Democratic	Wayne Byers	808	28.80	-0.30
Liberal	Darrin Lamoureux	77	2.74	
Progressive Conservative	Randall Edge	70	2.49	
Green	Luke Bonsan	49	1.75	-2.74
Total valid votes		2,806	100.00	
Saskatchewan hold		Swing		-0.95

== Cabinet Positions ==
Saskatchewan provincial government of Scott Moe
Cabinet post (1)
Predecessor	Office	Successor
Gordon Wyant	Minister of Advanced Education; May 17, 2024–	Incumbent
