= 2018 Saskatchewan Party leadership election =

Provincial party election in Canada

- January 27, 2018
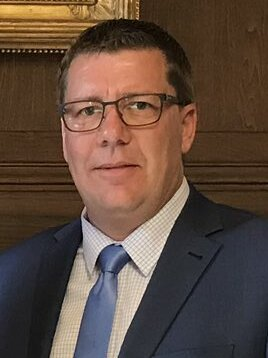
Candidate	Scott Moe	Alanna Koch
Runoff	8,075 (53.87%)	6,914 (46.13%)
First ballot	4,483 (26.13%)	4,529 (26.39%)
Leader before election
Brad Wall
Leader after election
Scott Moe

2018 Saskatchewan Party leadership election
- Date: January 27, 2018
- Convention: Saskatoon
- Resigning leader: Brad Wall
- Won by: Scott Moe
- Ballots: 5
- Candidates: 6
- Entrance fee: $25,000
- Spending limit: $250,000

The Saskatchewan Party held a leadership election on January 27, 2018, to elect a replacement for party leader and Premier Brad Wall. Wall had announced on August 10, 2017 that he would be retiring from politics once his successor was chosen. The winner, Scott Moe, succeeded Wall as Premier of Saskatchewan on February 2, 2018.

The leadership election was conducted by a one member-one vote preferential ballot system with voters able to either mail-in ballots or vote in person. Candidates had a $250,000 campaign expense limit and were required to disclose the names of contributors who donate $250 or more. The deadline for membership sales for those wanting to vote was on December 8, 2017. Patrick Bundrock was the Chief Electoral Officer.

== Timeline ==
- August 10, 2017 – Party leader and premier, Brad Wall, announces his decision to resign as soon as his successor is chosen.
- August 18, 2017 – The Saskatchewan Party's provincial council met to discuss the convention date and location, nomination filing fees, the voting system, campaign expense limits, and timelines. Wall's successor will be chosen using a one-member, one-vote election.
- August 28, 2017 – Deadline given by Premier Wall to members of his cabinet to announce whether or not they intended to run for leader and resign from cabinet if they are.
- October 19, 2017, 7 pm – Leadership debate in Swift Current.
- October 26, 2017, 7 pm – Leadership debate in Melfort.
- November 3–5, 2017 – Saskatchewan Party policy convention held in Saskatoon.
  - November 4, 2017, 2 pm – Leadership debate held at Saskatchewan Party convention.
- November 16, 2017, 7 pm – Leadership debate in North Battleford.
- November 24, 2017, noon – Deadline for candidates to file their nomination papers along with a $25,000 entry fee. In order to qualify, candidates must be nominated by at least 250 party members in total from at least 25 different constituencies.
- November 30, 2017, 7 pm – Leadership debate in Weyburn.
- December 7, 2017, 7 pm – Leadership debate in Regina.
- December 8, 2017, 5 pm – Membership deadline for eligibility to vote in the election.
- January 26, 2018, 5 pm – Deadline for mail-in ballots to be returned.
- January 27, 2018 – In-person voting. Ballots counted and winner announced.

== Declared candidates ==
=== Tina Beaudry-Mellor ===
Background

Tina Beaudry-Mellor was most recently, Minister of Social Services and Minister Responsible for the Status of Women (2016–2017), and MLA for Regina University (2016–2020)

Date campaign launched: August 15, 2017
Campaign website:

Supporters:

- MLAs:
- MPs:
- Municipal politicians:
- Former MLAs:
- Former MPs:
- Other prominent individuals:
- Organizations:
- Media:

Other information:

=== Ken Cheveldayoff ===
Background

Ken Cheveldayoff was most recently Minister of Parks, Culture, Sport and Minister responsible for the Public Service Commission (2016–2017) and was previously Minister of Crown Corporations (2007–2009), Minister of Enterprise (2009–2010), Minister of First Nations and Métis Relations (2010–2012), Minister of Environment, Responsible for SaskWater and the Water Security Agency (2012–2014), Government House Leader (2014–2016). He was first elected as the MLA for Saskatoon Silver Springs (2003–2016) and is currently the MLA for Saskatoon Willowgrove (2016–present)

Date announced: August 28, 2017
Campaign website: chevyforleader.ca

Supporters:

- MLAs: Randy Weekes, Laura Ross, Eric Olauson, David Buckingham, Greg Brkich, Delbert Kirsch, Warren Steinley, Colleen Young, Warren Michelson
- MPs: Brad Trost
- Municipal politicians:
- Former MLAs: Darryl Hickie
- Former MPs: Rob Clarke
- Other prominent individuals: Norm Rebin
- Organizations: RightNow
- Media:

Other information:

=== Alanna Koch ===
Background

Alanna Koch has served as Deputy Minister to the Premier (2016–2017) and Deputy Minister of Agriculture (2007–2016). Before entering the civil service she was executive director of the Western Canadian Wheat Growers and as president of the Canadian Agri-Food Trade Alliance, among other organizations.

Date announced: August 28, 2017
Campaign website: AlannaForLeader

Supporters:

- MLAs: (2) Don McMorris (Indian Head-Milestone), Dan D'Autremont (Cannington)
- MPs:
- Municipal politicians:
- Former MLAs:
- Former MPs:
- Other prominent individuals:
- Organizations:
- Media:

Other information:

=== Scott Moe ===
Background

Scott Moe was most recently Minister of the Environment (2016–2017). He was previously Minister of Advanced Education (2015–2016). Moe has been MLA for Rosthern-Shellbrook since 2011.

Date announced: September 1, 2017
Campaign website: standwithscott.ca

Supporters

- MLAs: (21) Jeremy Harrison, Bronwyn Eyre, Dave Marit, Donna Harpauer, Doug Steele, Dustin Duncan, Fred Bradshaw, Greg Lawrence, Greg Ottenbreit, Hugh Nerlien, Jim Reiter, Joe Hargrave, Kevin Doherty, Lori Carr, Paul Merriman, Muhammad Fiaz, Nadine Wilson, Nancy Heppner, Steven Bonk, Terry Dennis, Warren Kaeding
- MPs:
- Municipal politicians:
- Former MLAs:
- Former MPs:
- Other prominent individuals:
- Organizations:
- Media:

Other information:

Moe has promised to fight the federally imposed carbon tax.

=== Gordon Wyant ===
Background

Gordon Wyant was the Minister of Justice (2012–2017), and was MLA for Saskatoon Northwest (2010–2024)

Date announced: August 25, 2017
Campaign website: gordwyant.ca

Supporters

- MLAs: (3) Lyle Stewart (Lumsden-Morse), Mark Docherty (Regina Coronation Park), Glen Hart (Last Mountain-Touchwood)
- MPs:
- Municipal politicians:
- Former MLAs: (5) June Draude (Kelvington-Wadena), Victoria Jurgens (Prince Albert Northcote), Rod Gantefoer (Melfort), Russ Marchuk (Regina Douglas Park), Yogi Huyghebaert (Wood River)
- Former MPs: (1) Carol Skelton (Saskatoon—Rosetown—Biggar)
- Other prominent individuals:
- Organizations:
- Media:

Other information:

== Withdrawn candidates ==
- Jeremy Harrison, MLA for Meadow Lake (2007–present), Minister of the Economy (2016–2017), Minister Responsible for Tourism, Innovation, Trade and the Saskatchewan Liquor and Gaming Commission (2016-2017), Government House Leader (2011–2014), Minister of Enterprise (2010–2012), Minister of Municipal Affairs (2009–2012, Federal Tory MP for Desnethé—Missinippi—Churchill River; Endorsed Scott Moe

Date announced: August 19, 2017
Date withdrew: September 1, 2017
Subsequently endorsed: Scott Moe

- Rob Clarke, former MP for Desnethé—Missinippi—Churchill River; Endorsed Ken Cheveldayoff

Date announced: November 15, 2017
Date withdrew: December 13, 2017 (As Clarke withdrew after the deadline his name remained on the ballot)

== Declined ==
- Don Atchison, Mayor of Saskatoon (2003–2016)
- Kelly Block, Conservative MP for Saskatoon—Rosetown—Biggar (2008–2015) and Carlton Trail—Eagle Creek (2015–present)
- Steven Bonk, Minister of the Economy (2017–present), MLA for Moosomin (2016–present)
- Kevin Doherty, Minister of Finance (2015–2017), MLA for Regina Northeast (2011–2018)
- Dustin Duncan, Minister of Tourism, Parks, Culture and Sport (2009–2010), Minister of the Environment (2010-2012), Minister of Health (2012-2016), Minister of Energy & Resources (2016–2017), MLA for Weyburn-Big Muddy (2006–2024)
- Rob Norris, former Minister of Advanced Education, Employment and Labour (2007–2010), Minister of Advanced Education, Employment and Immigration and for SaskPower and Innovation (2010-2012), MLA for Saskatoon Greystone (2007–2016)
- Jim Reiter, Minister of Highways and Infrastructure (2009–2012), Minister of Government Relations and Minister of First Nations, Métis and Northern Affairs (2012-2016), Minister of Health (2016–present), MLA for Rosetown-Elrose (2007–present)
- Gerry Ritz, federal Minister of Agriculture (2007-2015), Reform, Canadian Alliance, and then Conservative Party of Canada MP for Battlefords—Lloydminster (1997–2017).
- Brad Trost, Conservative Party of Canada MP for Saskatoon—University, Saskatchewan (2015–2019), had represented Saskatoon—Humboldt, Saskatchewan (2004–2015), and was appointed Official Opposition Critic for Canada–U.S. Relations (2015–2016) following the 2015 election. 2017 federal Conservative Party leadership candidate. endorsed Cheveldayoff

== Results ==
= Eliminated from next round
= Winner

Candidate	Ballot 1	Ballot 2		Ballot 3		Ballot 4		Ballot 5	
Name	Votes	Votes	+/- (pp)	Votes	+/- (pp)	Votes	+/- (pp)	Votes	+/- (pp)
Alanna Koch	4,529; 26.39%	4,533; 26.42%	+4 +0.03%	4,598; 26.82%	+65 +0.4%	5,591; 34.06%	+993 +7.24%	6,914; 46.13%	+1,323 +12.07%
Scott Moe	4,483; 26.13%	4,495; 26.20%	+12 +0.07%	4,544; 26.51%	+49 +0.31%	5,980; 36.46%	+1,436 +9.95%	8,075; 53.87%	+2,095 +17.44%
Ken Cheveldayoff	4,177; 24.34%	4,202; 24.49%	+25 +0.15%	4,221; 24.62%	+19 +0.13%	4,844; 29.51%	+623 +4.89%	eliminated	
Gordon Wyant	3,696; 21.54%	3,698; 21.56%	+2 +0.02%	3,780; 22.05%	+82 +0.49%	eliminated			
Tina Beaudry-Mellor	226; 1.32%	228; 1.33%	+2 +0.02%	eliminated					
Rob Clarke	48; 0.28%	withdrew before balloting, endorsed Cheveldayoff							
