= Denis Allchurch =

Canadian provincial politician

Member of the Saskatchewan Legislative Assembly for Rosthern-Shellbrook Shellbrook-Spiritwood (1999-2003)
- In office September 16, 1999 – November 7, 2011
- Preceded by: Lloyd Johnson
- Succeeded by: Scott Moe

Personal details
- Born: 1953 (age 72–73)
- Party: Saskatchewan Party (former), Saskatchewan United Party (starting 2024)

Denis Arthur Allchurch (born 1953) is a Canadian provincial politician. He is a member of the Saskatchewan United Party, and was formerly a member of the Saskatchewan Party.

== Career ==
Allchurch was elected to Legislative Assembly of Saskatchewan from 1999 from constituencies of Shellbrook-Spiritwood, unseating Lloyd Johnson of the then-governing New Democratic Party in a close race. In 2003 much Allchurch's riding was redistributed into Rosthern-Shellbrook. Running in a new district that included locales historically much less friendly to the NDP, Allchurch was re-elected by comfortable margins in 2003 and 2007.

However, Allchurch had difficulty retaining the loyalty of his own party's membership. He managed to defeat a challenge for his party nomination prior to the 2007 election. However, on March 3, 2011, Allchurch lost the party nomination for his constituency. Newcomer Scott Moe, a businessperson from Shellbrook, Saskatchewan, ran as the Saskatchewan Party candidate in the 2011 provincial election. Nomination challenges against sitting lawmakers are relatively uncommon in Canada, and successful such challenges are considered rare events. Allchurch's successor would go on to become Premier of Saskatchewan in 2018, an office he still holds as of 2026.

=== Saskatchewan United Party ===
In September 2024, it was announced that Allchurch would be a candidate in the 2024 Saskatchewan election under the Saskatchewan United Party banner in the Meadow Lake constituency.

== Election results ==
2007 Saskatchewan general election Rosthern-Shellbrook
Party	Candidate	Votes	%	±%
Saskatchewan	Denis Allchurch	4,134	57.50	–
NDP	Ron Blocka	2,553	35.51	
Liberal	Linda Neher	339	4.72	
Green	Margaret-Rose Uvery	163	2.27	–
Total		7,189	100.00	

2003 Saskatchewan general election: Rosthern-Shellbrook
Party	Candidate	Votes	%
Saskatchewan	Denis Allchurch	3,421	48.36
New Democratic	John Serheinko	2,585	36.54
Liberal	George Cameron	744	10.52
Western Independence	Laverne Isaac	324	4.58
Total		7,074	100.00
Source: Saskatchewan Archives Board – Election Results by Electoral Division, pg. 2.14–101

1999 Saskatchewan general election Shellbrook-Spiritwood
Party	Candidate	Votes	%	±%
Saskatchewan	Denis Allchurch	2,895	48.36	–
NDP	Lloyd Johnson	2,594	36.54	
Liberal	Walter Krushelniski	1,223	10.52	
