= Executive Council of Saskatchewan =

Cabinet of the Canadian province of Saskatchewan

The Executive Council of Saskatchewan, often informally referred to as the Cabinet of Saskatchewan, is the cabinet of the Canadian province of Saskatchewan.

Typically made up of members of the Legislative Assembly of Saskatchewan (MLAs), the Cabinet is similar in structure and role to the Cabinet of Canada, although it is smaller in size. As federal and provincial responsibilities differ, there are a number of different portfolios between the federal and provincial governments.

The Lieutenant Governor of Saskatchewan, as representative of the King in Right of Saskatchewan, formally heads the council. The lieutenant-governor does not normally attend its meetings and in practice the Premier of Saskatchewan is its most powerful member, although its documents are often referred to as being issued by the Governor-in-Council. Other members of the Cabinet, the ministers, are selected by the Premier of Saskatchewan and appointed by the Lieutenant-Governor. Most cabinet ministers are the heads of ministries, but this is not always the case.

As at the federal level, the most important Cabinet post after that of the Premier is Minister of Finance. The next most powerful position is, arguably, Minister of Health, since the Ministry has a vast budget and is of central political import. Other powerful portfolios include Justice, Education, and Energy and Resources. The government at times establishes and disbands particular ministries.

== Honorifics ==
In 2019, all then-living former Executive Council members were automatically appointed honorary members of the Executive Council and styled "The Honourable" with the post-nominal letters “ECS” for life. This also applied to all current members and applies to all future members. Honorary membership is also automatically terminated upon conviction for an indictable offence.

== Current Cabinet ==
The current ministry has been in place since 2007, when the Saskatchewan Party won the general election of that year under the leadership of Brad Wall. The government was returned to office after the elections of 2011 and 2016. On February 2, 2018, Scott Moe succeeded Wall as Premier, and a new cabinet was formed. Moe's government was returned to office after the elections of 2020 and 2024. The current cabinet was established on November 7, 2024, after the 2024 general election.

Members are listed in order of precedence.

Lieutenant Governor
Her Honour the Honourable Bernadette McIntyre		2025–present	
Portfolio	Minister	Cabinet Minister since:	Portfolio since:
Premier of Saskatchewan; President of the Executive Council & Minister of Intergovernmental Affairs	Scott Moe	2015–2017; 2018–present	2018–present
Deputy Premier & Minister of Finance & Minister of Immigration and Careers Training & Minister of Labour Relations and Workplace Safety	Jim Reiter	2009–present	2024–present
Minister of Justice and Attorney General &Minister of Corrections, Policing and Public Safety &Minister Responsible for the Firearms Secretariat	Tim McLeod	2022–present	2024–present
Minister of Health	Jeremy Cockrill	2022–present	2024–present
Minister of Education	Everett Hindley	2020–present	2024–present
Minister of Crown Investments Corporation & Minister Responsible for all major Crown corporations & Minister Responsible for the Public Service Commission &Minister Responsible for Lotteries and Gaming Saskatchewan Corporation	Jeremy Harrison	2009–2012; 2014–2017; 2018–present	2024–present
Minister of Agriculture	Daryl Harrison	2024–present	2024–present
Minister of Social Services	Terry Jenson	2024–present	2024–present
Minister of Energy and Resources	Colleen Young	2024–present	2024–present
Minister of Trade and Export Development & Minister Responsible for Innovation	Warren Kaeding	2018–2022; 2024–present	2024–present
Minister of Government Relations & Minister Responsible for First Nations, Métis and Northern Affairs & Minister Responsible for the Provincial Capital Commission	Eric Schmalz	2024–present	2024–present
Minister of Parks, Culture and Sport & Minister Responsible for the Status of Women & Minister Responsible for Tourism Saskatchewan & Minister Responsible for Saskatchewan Liquor and Gaming Authority	Alana Ross	2024–present	2024–present
Minister of Mental Health and Addictions, Seniors and Rural and Remote Health	Lori Carr	2018–present	2024–present
Minister of Highways & Minister of SaskBuilds and Procurement & Minister Responsible for the Global Transportation Hub Authority	Dave Marit	2016–present	2024–present
Minister of Environment	Travis Keisig	2024–present	2024–present
Minister of Advanced Education	Ken Cheveldayoff	2007–2020; 2024–present	2024–present
