= Cheveldayoff =

Cheveldayoff is a surname. Notable people with the surname include:

- Ken Cheveldayoff (born 1965), Canadian politician
- Kevin Cheveldayoff (born 1970), Canadian ice hockey defenceman, brother of Ken
- Ty Cheveldayoff (born 2003), Canadian ice hockey player
