= GTH =

GTH may refer to:

- Global Telecom Holding, a Dutch telecommunications company
- Global Transportation Hub Authority, a crown corporation of Saskatchewan, Canada
- GMM Tai Hub, a defunct Thai film studio
