= Jim Reiter =

Canadian politician

The Honourable Jim Reiter ECS MLA

Deputy Premier of Saskatchewan
- Incumbent
- Assumed office November 7, 2024
- Premier: Scott Moe
- Preceded by: Donna Harpauer

Minister of Finance
- Incumbent
- Assumed office November 7, 2024
- Leader: Scott Moe

Member of the Saskatchewan Legislative Assembly for Rosetown-Delisle Rosetown-Elrose (2007-2024)
- Incumbent
- Assumed office November 7, 2007
- Preceded by: Elwin Hermanson

Personal details
- Born: Tramping Lake, Saskatchewan, Canada
- Party: Saskatchewan Party

James Reiter is a Canadian politician. He represents the electoral district of Rosetown-Delisle in the Legislative Assembly of Saskatchewan as a member of the Saskatchewan Party. Reiter was first elected in the 2007 general election.

On May 29, 2009, Reiter was appointed Minister of Highways & Infrastructure by Saskatchewan Premier Brad Wall.

Saskatchewan General Election 2007: Rosetown-Elrose
Party	Candidate	Votes	%	±%
Saskatchewan	Jim Reiter	5,669	71.18%	–
NDP	Eric Anderson	1,592	19.99%	
Liberal	Tracey Kowalchuk	485	6.09%	
Green	Kirk Friggstad	218	2.74%	–
Total		7,964	100.00%	

== Cabinet positions ==
Saskatchewan provincial government of Scott Moe
Cabinet posts (3)
Predecessor	Office	Successor
Bronwyn Eyre	Minister of Energy and Resources; May 31, 2022–	Incumbent
Ken Cheveldayoff	Minister of SaskBuilds and Procurement; November 9, 2020–May 31, 2022	Incumbent
con'd from Wall Ministry	Minister of Health; February 2, 2018–November 9, 2020	Paul Merriman
Saskatchewan provincial government of Brad Wall
Cabinet posts (5)
Predecessor	Office	Successor
Dustin Duncan	Minister of Health; August 23, 2016–February 2, 2018	con'd into Moe Ministry
Don McMorris	Minister of Crown Investments; August 8, 2016–August 23, 2016	Joe Hargrave
Laura Ross	Minister of Government Relations; May 25, 2012–August 23, 2016	Donna Harpauer
Ken Cheveldayoff	Minister of First Nations, Métis and Northern Affairs; May 25, 2012–August 23, 2016	Donna Harpauer
Wayne Elhard	Minister of Highways and Infrastructure; May 29, 2009–May 25, 2012	Don McMorris
