= Scott Moe =

Premier of Saskatchewan since 2018

The Honourable Scott Moe ECS MLA
- Moe in 2026

15th Premier of Saskatchewan
- Incumbent
- Assumed office February 2, 2018
- Monarchs: Elizabeth II; Charles III
- Lieutenant Governor: Vaughn Solomon Schofield; W. Thomas Molloy; Russell Mirasty; Bernadette McIntyre
- Deputy: Gordon Wyant; Donna Harpauer; Jim Reiter
- Preceded by: Brad Wall

Leader of the Saskatchewan Party
- Incumbent
- Assumed office January 27, 2018
- President: James Thornsteinson
- Preceded by: Brad Wall
Saskatchewan Executive Council
Minister of Environment
In office August 23, 2016 – August 30, 2017
| Premier | Brad Wall |
| Preceded by | Herb Cox |
| Succeeded by | Dustin Duncan |
In office June 5, 2014 – May 21, 2015
| Premier | Brad Wall |
| Preceded by | Ken Cheveldayoff |
| Succeeded by | Herb Cox |
Minister of Advanced Education
In office May 21, 2015 – August 23, 2016
| Premier | Brad Wall |
| Preceded by | Kevin Doherty |
| Succeeded by | Bronwyn Eyre |

Member of the Legislative Assembly of Saskatchewan for Rosthern-Shellbrook
- Incumbent
- Assumed office November 7, 2011
- Preceded by: Denis Allchurch

Personal details
- Born: July 31, 1973 (age 53) Prince Albert, Saskatchewan
- Party: Saskatchewan
- Spouse: Krista Moe
- Children: 2
- Website: www.saskatchewan.ca/premier

Scott Moe (born July 31, 1973) is a Saskatchewanian politician serving as the 15th premier since February 2, 2018. He is a member of the Legislative Assembly of Saskatchewan for the riding of Rosthern-Shellbrook, first elected in 2011.

Moe served in the Saskatchewan Party cabinet from 2014 to 2017 under the premiership of Brad Wall, twice as minister of environment and also as minister of advanced education. In January 2018, he was chosen to succeed Wall as leader of the Saskatchewan Party. He led the party to its fourth and fifth consecutive majority governments in 2020 and 2024, respectively. Since becoming premier, Moe has consistently been ranked among the most popular first ministers in Canada.

Moe's tenure has been defined by an adversarial relationship with the federal government, including a failed court challenge against federal carbon pricing, calls for a re-set to provincial-federal relations, and expanded powers for the province, such as in the realms of policing and taxation. His time in office has also been defined by the COVID-19 pandemic. While Saskatchewan was one of the hardest hit provinces in Canada, Moe prioritized limiting public health measures throughout the pandemic, and twice made Saskatchewan the first province to lift its pandemic-related public health orders. With the rise of new populist conservative parties in the province since he became premier, commentators have noted that Moe has increasingly adopted right-wing populist rhetoric. This has resulted in controversial legislation such as the Saskatchewan First Act and the Parents' Bill of Rights.

== Early life ==
Scott Moe was born in Prince Albert on July 31, 1973, the eldest of five children, and raised on a farm near Shellbrook. After high school he briefly moved to Yellowknife before returning to Saskatchewan and attending the University of Saskatchewan. He graduated with a Bachelor of Science in agriculture.

In the mid-1990s, while still attending university, Moe and his wife established a farming business, buying equipment and renting land. By early 2000, Moe had filed for bankruptcy with $208,500 in assets and $320,900 in liabilities. He has also owned gas stations and a pharmacy. After the bankruptcy, Moe moved to Vermilion, Alberta, where he worked selling farm equipment. He returned to Saskatchewan in 2003 and has worked in various community initiatives in and near Shellbrook including the Economic Development Corporation and the Shellbrook and District Physician Recruitment committee, which seeks to attract general practitioners to rural areas of the province without convenient access to local medical facilities.

During the 1990s, Moe was charged on two occasions for impaired driving. In 1992, Moe received a conviction for impaired driving while under the legal drinking age. In 1994, Moe was again charged with impaired driving as well as leaving the scene of an accident. The charges were ultimately stayed.

On May 29, 1997, Scott Moe ran a stop sign and caused a collision that killed Joanne Balog. Balog was travelling in another vehicle. Balog's 18-year-old son, Steve Balog, was the only other passenger and survived the collision with dislocated ribs and lacerations. Moe later stated that he could not specifically recall the collision. An RCMP investigation determined that Moe had attempted to cross the highway when it was unsafe and gave Moe a ticket for driving without due care and attention. Moe has stated that alcohol was not a factor in the collision, and that the collision had shaped his life since.

== Early political career ==
=== MLA and cabinet minister ===
Moe was first elected to the Legislative Assembly as a Saskatchewan Party MLA for Rosthern-Shellbrook in the 2011 election. Moe won the party nomination for the riding against an incumbent MLA, Denis Allchurch, who was seeking re-election.

Moe was appointed to the legislature's Standing Committee on Crown and Central Agencies and was deputy chair of the legislature's Standing Committee on Public Accounts. Moe entered Cabinet on June 5, 2014, as Minister of Environment and Minister responsible for SaskWater and the Water Security Agency. On May 21, 2015, he was appointed as Minister of Advanced Education.

Moe was re-elected in Rosthern-Shellbrook in the 2016 election and on August 23, 2016, Moe returned to his former role as Minister of Environment. It was in this second stint on the Environment file that Moe first drew national attention. On October 3, 2016, provincial Environment Ministers were meeting with Federal Environment Minister Catherine McKenna to work on a national agreement to reduce greenhouse gas emissions. On the same day, Prime Minister Justin Trudeau announced the federal government's plan to introduce a federal carbon tax for provinces that refused to implement their own. Moe, along with his counterparts from Nova Scotia and Newfoundland and Labrador, walked out of their meeting with McKenna in protest, with Moe describing the federal government's actions as reminiscent of a 'national energy program 2.0.' This signaled the beginning of a long battle between Saskatchewan, and eventually a number of other provinces, and the federal government over the tax. When an agreement was reached on a Pan-Canadian Framework for addressing climate change, Saskatchewan refused to sign because of the inclusion of carbon pricing, which meant the province left more than $60 million in federal funding on the table.

=== Saskatchewan Party leadership campaign ===
With the Saskatchewan Party falling in polls after forwarding a severe austerity budget in March 2017, Brad Wall announced in August of that year that he would be retiring, triggering a leadership race. On September 1, 2017, after resigning from Cabinet, Moe formally launched an unexpected campaign for the leadership of the party with the backing of 21 cabinet and caucus members, primarily from rural Saskatchewan. Moe's campaign promises included a balanced budget by 2019, restoring $30 million of the $50 million in education funding that had recently been cut from Saskatchewan schools, reinstating the PST exemption on health, life, and accident insurance products, and a renewed focus on trade and exports including through a new Ministry of Export and Trade. In addition, he vowed to continue to fight against a federal carbon tax.

During his campaign, Moe stated that he did not personally support abortion, and that he would support a discussion of parental notification and parental consent for women to have an abortion. In an interview with the anti-abortion group "Right Now", Moe suggested he would be open to legislation to limit the time frame in which a woman could have an abortion.

On January 27, 2018, at the Saskatchewan Party convention in Saskatoon, Moe was elected the party's new leader in a six-person contest with 54% of the vote on the fifth ballot. He defeated Alanna Koch, who had served as deputy minister to the Premier under Wall, and who held a narrow lead on each of the first four ballots.

== Premier of Saskatchewan (2018–present) ==
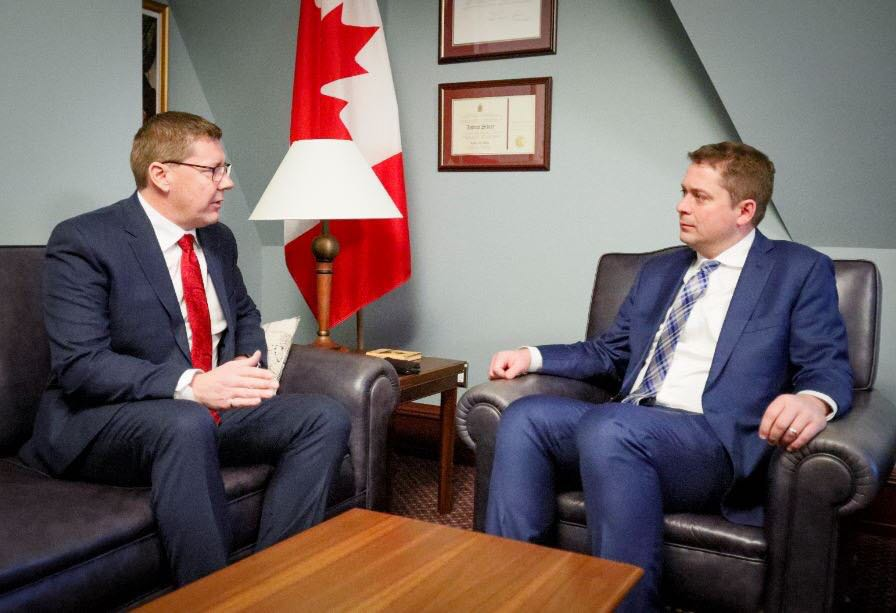
Moe with Andrew Scheer in November 2019.

Moe was sworn in as Saskatchewan's 15th Premier and appointed his first Cabinet on February 2, 2018. Notably, Alanna Koch was not returned as deputy minister to the Premier after narrowly losing her party leadership bid. Until 2020, Moe consistently ranked at the top of the table as Canada's most popular premier. His ranking dropped substantially in the summer of 2020 after the onset of the COVID-19 pandemic. However, this pandemic-related hit was short-lived, and in the summer of 2023 Moe was tied as the most popular premier in the country, with Nova Scotia's Tim Houston. A year later, while his overall approval rating dropped from above 60% to below 50%, Moe continued to rank among the most popular premiers.

Moe led the Saskatchewan Party into the 2020 provincial election in October 2020. Moe had mused publicly about calling a snap election in the spring of 2020, but abandoned the idea with the onset of the COVID pandemic. He based his first campaign as leader on an economic recovery from the pandemic, including an avoidance of reinstating any business closures, and a promise to balance the provincial budget by 2024. As part of his pitch, Moe touted the province's success in handling the pandemic. He also appealed to homeowners with promises of rebates on energy bills and a home renovation tax credit. On October 26, the Saskatchewan Party was re-elected to its fourth consecutive majority government. Moe was re-elected in Rosthern-Shellbrook with nearly 80% of the vote. Moe again led the Saskatchewan Party to victory in the 2024 Saskatchewan general election—the party's fifth consecutive victory matched the run of Tommy Douglas' CCF when it held power from 1944 until 1964. However, Moe's majority was significantly reduced as the party was nearly swept from the major urban centres of Regina and Saskatoon, retaining just one Saskatoon seat by a margin of 136 votes as the Opposition NDP made large urban gains.

=== Economic policy ===
Moe's earliest policies included restoring $30 million in education funding and a PST exemption on life, health, and accident insurance products. His 2018 budget, the first after the deeply unpopular 2017 austerity budget, ran a $365 million deficit and added $2.3 billion of provincial debt. Moe also replaced the Ministry of the Economy with the Ministry of Trade and Export Development, and has undertaken international trade missions in the United States, China, India, Japan, and South Korea.

The Premier had to quickly retreat again from his promise to balance the budget. In March 2021, ahead of the release of the new provincial budget, Moe's finance minister, Donna Harpauer, signaled that the government would not balance the budget by 2024. Moe admitted that the economic recovery period from the pandemic was uncertain and therefore would no longer commit to a date for when the budget would be balanced. In 2025, he signed agreements with other provinces, to reduce interprovincial trade barriers in the midst of the United States trade war with Canada.

=== Environment ===
Moe and the Saskatchewan Party have long-opposed the federal government's institution of a federal carbon tax. As part of the Greenhouse Gas Pollution Pricing Act (GGPPA), any province which did not implement its own tax rate on greenhouse gas pollution by January 2019 would have a rate set by the federal government. Saskatchewan launched a court challenge in April 2018, arguing to the Saskatchewan Court of Appeal that the GGPPA was unconstitutional. Polling showed widespread support for the challenge within the province at 88%. More than a year later and after a federal tax rate had already been implemented in Saskatchewan for refusing to institute its own, the Saskatchewan court released its decision in May 2019, upholding the federal law. The provinces of Ontario and Alberta followed Saskatchewan's lead and launched their own constitutional challenges against the carbon pricing act; in June 2019 Ontario's Court of Appeal also upheld the federal law, while in February 2020 the Alberta Court of Appeal ruled that the law was unconstitutional. Saskatchewan acted as an intervenor in the other challenges, and each case was referred to the Supreme Court. After Saskatchewan's Supreme Court case was initially delayed with the onset of the COVID-19 pandemic, it was eventually heard in September 2020, although the Court adjourned without a decision, stating that it would release a decision at a later date after hearing challenges from Ontario and Alberta. Moe continued his vocal opposition to carbon pricing when the federal government announced in December 2020 that the federal tax would be increasing to $170 per tonne by the year 2030, reiterating that the scheme is unconstitutional despite the pending Supreme Court decision. In March 2021, the Supreme Court ruled that the Greenhouse Gas Pollution Pricing Act is constitutional. As a result of the ruling, Moe signaled that the province would develop its own carbon pricing scheme to succeed the federal scheme. Moe re-opened the debate over the carbon tax in November 2023, after the federal government provided a limited exemption for home-heating oil; Moe charged that it was unfair to exempt certain heating source and not others, and ultimately introduced a law meant to enable the province's utilities to stop remitting the federal tax on natural gas bills. Moe later extended this to electric home heating as well.

Moe has based his approach to climate and environment on technology like carbon capture and storage and on agriculture. However, this approach, encapsulated in the province's "Prairie Resilience" climate change strategy, has been criticized by environmental experts and organizations, including the Saskatchewan Environmental Society, as inadequate, especially in failing to reduce the province's greenhouse gas emissions, which are the highest per capita in Canada. Moe has also been a staunch advocate for the building of new pipelines, and in February 2020 he formed a cabinet committee tasked with assessing how the government could help the cause.

=== Federal relations ===
While energy issues including carbon pricing and pipelines have been at the core of Moe's adversarial relationship with the federal government, he has been a frequent critic of the Liberal government in other areas and has expressed a desire to set new terms for relations with the federal government. In the wake of the Liberals' 2019 election victory, in which they did not win a seat in Saskatchewan, Moe released a statement calling for "A New Deal with Canada," including a revised formula for equalization payments. He further stated that he would explore how Saskatchewan could gain more control over taxation and immigration, citing Quebec's unique powers in these areas as an example. While other conservative provincial governments denounced western separatist rhetoric and signaled a willingness to work with Ottawa, Moe maintained a hard line approach and has been accused of stoking separatist sentiment. After the 2020 provincial election, in which the separatist Buffalo Party received more than 2.5% of the popular vote despite running candidates in only 17 of 61 ridings, Moe stated, "[w]e share your frustrations, and we share many of your objectives," and he called for more "independence" and "autonomy" for the province. Moe has also criticized federal firearms legislation, and in anticipation of a provision allowing cities to ban handguns, Moe's government passed its own legislation banning municipalities from setting independent gun laws.

Moe criticized Justin Trudeau's decision to call a snap election, causing the 2021 Canadian federal election, calling it "the most pointless election in Canadian history." In November 2021, Moe again brought up the issue of more autonomy for Saskatchewan after the Liberals announced a future cap on oil and gas emissions at COP 26. Moe again referenced Quebec's relationship with the federal government and suggested that Saskatchewan should be considered a "nation within a nation," seeking more autonomy including in areas such as taxation and policing. Moe's statements were applauded by both the federal separatist Maverick Party and the provincial separatist Buffalo Party; the latter thanked Moe "for taking the time to read our platform, and marketing it for us."

In October 2022, Moe released a white paper on provincial autonomy titled "Drawing the Line: Defending Saskatchewan's Economy Autonomy." The paper claimed that the province stood to lose more than $100 billion by 2035 due to federal environmental policies, asserted that the province was prepared to attempt further court actions against pollution regulation, and reiterated Moe's desire for more provincial power in taxation, immigration, and other areas. The paper was widely criticized. An Alberta-based economist called the economic analysis "incredibly weak," while economists in Saskatchewan criticized it for ignoring carbon pricing rebates and the costs of climate change. A number of academics and Indigenous leaders took issue with the paper failing to mention anything about Indigenous peoples and rights. The tenets of the white paper were ultimately enshrined in legislation when Moe's government introduced and passed the Saskatchewan First Act, a bill meant to "confirm" the province's autonomy and exclusive jurisdiction over natural resources.

Moe endorsed Pierre Poilievre's Conservative Party ahead of the 2025 federal election. In January 2026, he accompanied Prime Minister Mark Carney during a state visit to China. During the meeting, Carney and Chinese leader Xi Jinping agreed to lower tariffs on Canadian canola oil from 85% to 15%.

=== Wascana Park protests ===
In February 2018, protestors set up a teepee camp in Wascana Park near the Legislature to raise awareness about anti-Indigenous racism, and in particular the disproportionate apprehension of Indigenous children by Child and Family Services. Campers were seeking changes to the welfare system as well as updates to the police and coroner's act. Moe refused to meet with organizers at the camp, which was dubbed "Justice For Our Stolen Children." Rather, Moe repeatedly argued that the camp was violating local bylaws and, concerned over potential disruptions to Canada Day celebrations, the government issued an eviction notice in early June. On June 18, six people from the camp were arrested and the camp was dismantled. However, the camp was set back up on June 21 with an even larger presence. Moe renewed calls for the police to remove the camp, and although representatives from the government agreed to meet with camp organizers in early July, Moe opted not to join them. The camp unsuccessfully requested further meetings, and the province and the camp each filed court cases, with the province seeking removal of the camp and the camp seeking for the June arrests to be deemed an infringement of charter rights. While a decision was reserved on the latter question, the court ordered the camp to disband in September. The camp disbanded on September 12, 197 days after it was first erected. Camp organizers expressed dismay that park bylaws proved to be a bigger priority than addressing the issues the camp brought forward.

In July 2020, another camp was set up in Wascana Park. This was an effort to address a suicide crisis in northern Saskatchewan after the Saskatchewan Party voted unanimously against a suicide prevention bill in June 2020. Moe refused to meet with the organizer of what was dubbed the "Walking With Our Angels" camp, Tristen Durocher, and the government filed a court case to evict the camp for violating park bylaws. In this case the court ruled against the government, striking down the bylaws for infringing on constitutional protections. Moe continued to call the camp illegal despite the decision, and he did not meet with Durocher before his 44-day protest ended.

=== COVID-19 pandemic ===
Saskatchewan's first case of COVID-19 was confirmed on March 12, 2020. Opposition leader Ryan Meili called for an all-party committee, including medical and economic experts, to be formed to handle the emerging pandemic, but Moe rejected the overture. Despite both the pandemic and the province's fixed-election law, Moe mused openly about calling a spring election ahead of the scheduled October election. However, on March 18 Moe declared a state of emergency, giving the province the power to institute far-reaching public health measures. The province mandated a wide range of businesses to close temporarily to slow the onset of the pandemic in the province, and with relatively low case numbers most businesses were allowed to re-open by July. In the fall, Moe vowed not to instate a "lockdown", arguing that doing so would be detrimental to business in the province. Saskatchewan proved to be one of the hardest hit provinces in a second wave of cases beginning in the fall of 2020, and by early 2021 the province had the highest case rate in the country. The province introduced new public health measures during this second wave, but Moe persistently rejected calls for a short-term closure of businesses, opting to keep most establishments open at reduced capacities, even as some businesses argued that they would benefit from a stricter approach. Moreover, despite prioritizing keeping the economy open, Saskatchewan posted the highest number of job losses in the country between March 2020 and March 2021. Moe's popularity began to wane as a result, and he was criticized for his handling of the second wave.

Moe was further criticized for unusually long adjournments of the Legislature during the pandemic, and accused of avoiding democratic accountability. Moe himself persistently criticized the federal government for its handling of vaccine procurement. On multiple occasions Moe defended Saskatchewan's chief medical health officer, Dr. Saqib Shahab, after Shahab was subjected to racist insults and protests at his home by anti-mask protestors.

On March 9, 2021, Moe moved to once again ease public health restrictions as cases trended downwards. However, public health experts criticized this move, particularly with the arrival of known variants-of-concern in the province. The province was subsequently subjected to a third wave that raised concerns among health care workers that the province's health care system was strained.

With vaccines widely available and the third wave receding by May 2021, Moe angled to make Saskatchewan the first province to lift all public health measures related to the pandemic. On July 11, Moe announced that all remaining public health measures were lifted, and stated that "Instead of trying to control the infection rate through government-imposed restrictions and government rules, we can now control COVID through vaccines." At the time Moe also announced that regular public updates would end. However, despite this optimism, by August it was clear that Saskatchewan had the lowest vaccination rates of any province and was in the early stages of a fourth wave driven by infections predominantly among unvaccinated people. Local health experts renewed calls for public health measures to help curb the growth of cases, culminating in an August 26 letter signed by provincial medical health officers requesting specific measures such as mask mandates and a reinstatement of mandatory isolation for positive cases. Moe publicly rejected these requests, stating that it would be "grossly unfair" to vaccinated people to reinstate public health measures. By early September Saskatchewan's case rate was three times higher than the Canadian average. Health care workers continued speaking publicly, detailing the strain the fourth wave was placing on the health care system and accusing the government of downplaying a crisis in emergency departments in particular. In addition, municipal leaders, including the mayors of Saskatoon and Prince Albert, publicly called for more action from the provincial government.

After weeks of spurning calls for a provincial response and amid record case and hospitalization numbers, Moe announced on September 16, 2021, that the province would reinstate certain public health measures as well as a proof-of-vaccination system for certain venues and businesses. Moe was criticized both for waiting too long to introduce the measures and for refusing accountability for having lifted all measures approximately two months prior. By mid-October Moe admitted that the province could have acted sooner in instating public health measures, and said he was "sorry" to those in the province whose health care procedures were cancelled or deferred indefinitely due to triaging in the overwhelmed health care system. That month, Saskatchewan began airlifting ICU patients to Ontario in a bid to relieve its strained hospital capacity. Criticism of Moe's handling of the fourth wave continued to build even after some public health measures were instated, with health care professionals and organizations such as the Canadian Medical Association calling openly for the province to do more, such as imposing gathering restrictions and other measures initially recommended in the August 26 letter from provincial medical health officers. On October 26 the province's chief medical health officer stated that these requests were "closely aligned" with the recommendations that he had been making, which were being rejected by the government.

In January 2022, with cases in the province surging to new heights in a fifth wave, Moe resisted calls for increased public health measures, rejecting gathering limits as more harmful than helpful despite repeated public recommendations by the chief medical health officer to avoid non-essential gatherings. Moe stated without evidence on numerous occasions that gathering limits were proving ineffective against the omicron variant in other provinces. On January 12 Moe pointed to Saskatchewan hospitalizations remaining stable as proof that no new restrictions were needed; however, by January 26 hospitalizations had reached levels not seen since the peak of the fourth wave. Saskatchewan also moved to restrict PCR testing, advising those who tested positive on self-administered RAT tests but who were experiencing no or only mild symptoms to merely isolate. This was criticized both for potentially obscuring the official case count and because the province's Workers' Compensation Board would not accept RAT test results as proof of diagnosis. On January 13, 2022, Moe announced that he had tested positive for COVID-19 on an at-home Rapid antigen test. He stated that he was asymptomatic but would be isolating for five days. This revelation came one day after Moe repeatedly removed his mask to speak to reporters at a COVID-19 press conference.

On January 26, 2022, Moe announced that the province was likely to end both close contact isolation in schools and the proof-of-vaccination system, suggesting that they had "run their course." On January 29, Moe published a letter in support in support of the so-called Freedom Convoy protest seeking to end all COVID-related public health measures in Canada, stating that Saskatchewan would soon be ending its public health orders. Then, on February 2, Moe posted a video to social media in which he reiterated that Saskatchewan would be ending all such measures "very soon," stating that public health orders had been government restrictions on "rights and freedoms." Saskatchewan subsequently became the first province to lift all public health measures, on February 28. By April, the province had a hospitalization rate four times those of British Columbia and Ontario, which epidemiologists warned showed no signs of slowing down.

=== Education ===
In August 2022, more than 30 former students of a private Christian school in Saskatoon came forward to allege that they had been abused at the school. The revelation led to calls for restrictions on funding to independent and religious schools, which the Saskatchewan Party government had begun in 2012. While Moe's government declined to stop funding the schools, the government did appoint administrators to run the school and two others with staff from the original school to provide oversight and review policies. In December 2022, the provincial government was added as a defendant in a $25-million class-action lawsuit launched by former students against the school.

In August 2023, Moe's Education Minister, Dustin Duncan, introduced a new policy requiring parental consent for children under the age of 16 who wished to change their preferred pronouns while at school, while also banning third-party groups from participating in sexual health education, including experts on sexual assault. Moe made clear that the policy was inspired by the socially-conservative parental rights movement, and he defended charges that the government had not consulted experts in designing the policy—they had notably not consulted with school boards, the Saskatchewan Teachers' Federation, or the province's children and youth advocate—by arguing that parents were the only "experts" needing to be consulted. Under multiple freedom of information requests, it was revealed that the government had received eighteen letters that summer about a similar policy developed in New Brunswick. At the same time, a national Christian lobbying group, Action4Canada, claimed that it had sent more than 10,000 messages to Moe and Duncan and met with Duncan's staff earlier in 2023 to push for such a policy in Saskatchewan.

The new policy was widely denounced by educational and human rights experts. The province's Child Advocate reviewed the policy and issued a report on September 15, expressing concern that the policy could violate student's human rights, and recommending extensive revisions to the policy. UR Pride, a University of Regina organization supporting sexual and gender diversity, filed a lawsuit against the government in an effort to scrap the policy. In response, Moe stated that the government would be moving to turn the policy into law in the fall Legislative session, and that the government would be willing to invoke the notwithstanding clause to defend it, which drew further criticism from human rights experts along with federal Justice Minister Arif Virani. On September 28, a Regina Court of King's Bench judge granted an injunction against the policy, stating that "the protection of these youth surpasses that interest expressed by the government, pending a full and complete hearing." In the wake of the injunction, Moe reiterated his willingness to use the notwithstanding clause to enact the policy. Moe then recalled the Legislature two weeks early in October 2023, in a move to pass the legislation, entitled the Parents' Bill of Rights, as quickly as possible. The bill was passed into law on October 20.

== Controversies ==
=== Environment Minister ===
While he was Minister of the Environment and responsible for the Water Security Agency, Moe met with fellow Saskatchewan Party MLA Bill Boyd regarding Boyd's personal irrigation projects. The projects, which were reviewed by Moe, were later found to have illegally cultivated protected grasslands and involved building irrigation infrastructure into a river without obtaining the proper licensing permits. Regarding the process, Moe commented that he did not discuss the matter with Boyd after he was made aware that the project was in contravention of the Wildlife Habitat Protection Act, but that "[t]here was a failure in following the law." When asked about specifics of the meeting with Boyd, such as when it was, who had attended, and how it came about, Moe said he could not recall or did not know. Boyd was fined a total of $35,000 in relation to two charges laid in 2017 and ordered to remediate the shoreline violation. He was also removed from the Saskatchewan Party caucus by then-premier Brad Wall over the matter, and eventually resigned his position as MLA.

=== Vehicle crash ===
During the 2020 election, the son of Joanne Balog, who was killed in a 1997 car collision with Moe, revealed that Moe had never apologized to them. Steve Balog, who was injured in the crash, claimed that he only learned that Moe was the at-fault driver in the incident when the Premier was asked about the crash by the media during the election campaign, as the police did not disclose his identity at the time of the crash. Although Moe had publicly apologized for the crash previously, he declined to speak directly with the Balogs during the election campaign, stating it would be an inappropriate time to do so. Steve Balog criticized Moe for "flip-flopping" after he had suggested publicly that he would be reaching out to the Balogs. In the midst of this criticism, Moe revealed previously undisclosed stayed charges from a 1994 incident for impaired driving and leaving the scene of a crash or a collision.

=== Municipal infringement ===
In January 2021, after the executive committee for Regina's City Council adopted an amendment to its sponsorship policy that may have restricted the ability for some energy companies to advertise on City buildings and at City events, Moe released a statement threatening to withhold municipal surcharges from Crown energy companies SaskPower and SaskEnergy if City Council didn't reject the amendment. Moe's comments were criticized by Regina city councilors and the Municipalities of Saskatchewan for infringing on the city government's autonomy. The debate spurred significant backlash from the oil and gas industry lobby, and Council ultimately voted unanimously against the amendment.

=== COVID-19 remarks and measures ===
In February 2021, Moe sparked controversy when he suggested that those calling for stricter measures to address the COVID-19 pandemic were those able to work from home. Polling at the time showed that 67% of people polled in Saskatchewan saw the need for stricter measures. Moe's comments drew particular criticism from health care workers, many of whom have persistently called for stricter measures. The president of the Saskatchewan Federation of Labour, Lori Johb, responded by stating that the "numbers of people dying and becoming sick every day from COVID-19 are a direct reflection on the lack of action from our provincial government."

In April 2021, Moe and his Health Minister, Paul Merriman, rejected an invitation to tour an intensive care unit at Regina General Hospital. Moe had been criticized for downplaying the impact of the pandemic on Saskatchewan ICUs and health care workers at Regina General Hospital who invited Moe for a tour were quoted as saying, "‘If only the leadership would come and see what's really going on here, they would understand what we're dealing with."

In September 2021, Moe courted further controversy when he singled out northern and Indigenous communities for low vaccination rates and seemingly placed the blame on the federal government, incorrectly describing such communities as areas of "exclusive federal jurisdiction." Moe was called out by federal politicians, the Opposition, and by First Nations leadership, many of whom made the point that a number of southern and non-Indigenous communities in the province in fact had the lowest vaccination rates in the province, some as low as 12%.

In December 2021, Moe was criticized for phoning and engaging in an hour-long conversation with Nadine Ness, the head of the group "Unified Grassroots," known for its opposition to public health measures and its links to protests at hospitals and COVID conspiracy theories. Ness and Unified Grassroots had previously taken the province to court in a bid to reverse its proof-of-vaccination policy.

In January 2022, Moe dismissed a peer-reviewed study from the Royal Society of Canada regarding excess mortality in Canada during the pandemic as "some of the most egregious misinformation" of the pandemic. The study notes that Saskatchewan is well out-of-date for reporting deaths and as such may have substantially more COVID deaths than have been made public to date. Moe was widely criticized for this characterization of the study.

Moe stirred further controversy in January 2022 by writing a letter in support of the Freedom Convoy protest seeking to end all COVID-related public health measures in Canada. Moe was subsequently the only Premier thanked in a news conference by convoy organizers. In his letter, Moe wrote that an "unvaccinated trucker does not pose any greater risk of transmission than a vaccinated trucker." This was one of several statements Moe made downplaying the effectiveness of vaccines at reducing COVID transmission. These statements drew widespread condemnation and were called "unprecedented" in coming from a sitting Premier.

=== Education policies ===
Policy introduced ahead of the 2023–2024 school year requiring parental consent for students under the age of 16 wanting their chosen name or gender identity affirmed at school drew widespread criticism from education and human rights experts concerned that the policy violated the human rights of children and could result in harm to students. Moe's willingness to use the notwithstanding clause to enforce the policy also drew criticism. A national Christian lobbying organization claimed to have influenced the government towards developing the policy. It was later reported that the policy was developed in only 9 days and without consultation with school divisions. Moreover, an affidavit submitted to court revealed that the government's defense relied heavily on the submission of one person, an American clinical psychologist. A report from The Economist noted that the policy represented an encroachment of American-style "culture wars" into the Canadian political scene.

In October 2023, the Saskatchewan Trial Lawyers' Association criticized Moe for characterizing an injunction against the policy as "judicial overreach". The Association argued that such a charge could erode public trust in the judiciary. The same month, the province's human rights commissioner, Heather Kuttai, resigned in protest against the policy and the government's unwillingness to heed criticism; Kuttai characterized the Parents' Bill of Rights as "an attack" on the rights of kids. After Kuttai's resignation, the interim commission, Barry Wilcox, requested on behalf of the Commission that the government reconsider the legislation and work with experts in drafting policy. In addition, more than a dozen law faculty members from the University of Saskatchewan wrote a letter criticizing Moe's use of the notwithstanding clause, and urging him to allow the "normal legal process to take its course". Provincial labour unions also called for the repeal of the policy.

During the 2024 provincial election, Moe spontaneously announced a bathroom bill, stating that his "first order of business" after the election would be to enact rules requiring school students to use change rooms corresponding to their "biological sex". After winning the election, Moe stated that he "misspoke" and that the bathroom bill was not in fact a top priority, and would be subject to consultations with school boards. However, it was known that the proposal had been made in response to a story published in the Western Standard, which reported that a student at a school in southern Saskatchewan was uncomfortable with two transgender student peers using the girls' change room. The Canadian Press reported that the two students from the story were the children of a NDP candidate, which spurred calls from that party for Moe to apologize. Moe claimed he was unaware Clarke's children were the subject of the complaint. After the election, NDP MLA Jared Clarke accused Moe in the Legislature of targeting his children in the controversy, stating that Moe's "legacy is attacking vulnerable kids". NDP leader Carla Beck later stated that the issue was "a bar that never should have been crossed", adding that the two leaders had an agreement not to target candidate's families during the election campaign.

== Personal life ==
Moe is married to Krista Moe and the couple have two children. Moe is an avid fisherman and golfer.

== Electoral history ==
Electoral history of Sask Party under Scott Moe
| Year | Party | Votes | | | Seats | | Position |
| Year | Party | Total | % | ±% | Total | ± | Position |
|---|---|---|---|---|---|---|---|
| 2020 | Saskatchewan | 269,996 | 61.1% | –1.41% | 48 / 61 | –3 | Majority government |
| 2024 | Saskatchewan | 244,037 | 52.2% | –8.88% | 34 / 61 | –14 | Majority government |

Constituency elections

2024 Saskatchewan general election: Rosthern-Shellbrook
| Party | Candidate | Votes | % |
|---|---|---|---|
| Saskatchewan | Scott Moe | 5,279 | 62.34 |
| New Democratic | Mark Thunderchild | 2,069 | 24.43 |
| Saskatchewan United | Cody Lockhart | 1,031 | 12.18 |
| Green | Janice Dongworth | 89 | 1.05 |
| Total | | 8,468 | 100.0 |
Source: Elections Saskatchewan

2020 Saskatchewan general election: Rosthern-Shellbrook
| Party | Candidate | Votes | % |
|---|---|---|---|
| Saskatchewan | Scott Moe | 5,341 | 79.54 |
| New Democratic | Trina Miller | 1,084 | 16.14 |
| Green | Larry Neufeld | 146 | 2.17 |
| Progressive Conservative | Yvonne Choquette | 144 | 2.14 |
| Total valid votes | | 6,715 | 99.99 |
Source: Elections Saskatchewan

2016 Saskatchewan general election: Rosthern-Shellbrook
| Party | Candidate | Votes | % |
|---|---|---|---|
| Saskatchewan | Scott Moe | 4,724 | 71.59 |
| New Democratic | Rose Freeman | 1,288 | 19.52 |
| Liberal | Orrin Murray Greyeyes | 468 | 7.09 |
| Green | Jade Duckett | 119 | 1.80 |
| Total valid votes | | 6,599 | 100.0 |
Source: Saskatchewan Archives - Election Results by Electoral Division; Elections Saskatchewan

2011 Saskatchewan general election: Rosthern-Shellbrook
| Party | Candidate | Votes | % |
|---|---|---|---|
| Saskatchewan | Scott Moe | 4,724 | 71.59 |
| New Democratic | Clay DeBray | 2,174 | 31.84 |
| Green | Margaret-Rose Uvery | 212 | 3.10 |
| Total valid votes | | 6,828 | 100.0 |
Source: Saskatchewan Archives - Election Results by Electoral Division

== See also ==
- List of premiers of Saskatchewan
- Saskatchewan Party
