= Saskatoon Silver Springs =

Former provincial electoral district in Saskatchewan, Canada

Coordinates: 52°09′20″N 106°34′55″W

Saskatchewan electoral district
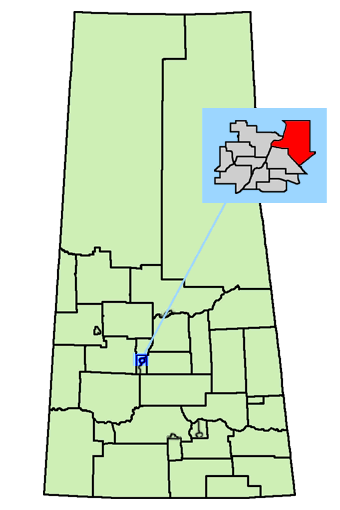

Defunct provincial electoral district
- Legislature: Legislative Assembly of Saskatchewan
- District created: 2002
- First contested: 2003
- Last contested: 2011

Demographics
- Electors: 16,180
- Census division(s): Division 11
- Census subdivision(s): Saskatoon

Saskatoon Silver Springs was a provincial electoral district for the Legislative Assembly of Saskatchewan, Canada. The district included the neighbourhoods of Silverspring, Forest Grove, Evergreen, Willowgrove, Erindale, and Arbor Creek.

This constituency was created by the Representation Act, 2002 (Saskatchewan) out of portions of the Saskatoon Meewasin and Saskatoon Sutherland ridings. It was dissolved by the Representation Act, 2013 (Saskatchewan) into Saskatoon Silverspring-Sutherland and Saskatoon Willowgrove.

== Election results ==
2011 Saskatchewan general election
Party	Candidate	Votes	%	±%
Saskatchewan	Ken Cheveldayoff	7,736	74.59	+12.79
NDP	Cindy Lee Sherban	2,242	21.62	-5.85
Green	D'Arcy Hande	230	2.22	+0.10
Liberal	Rod Stoesz	163	1.57	-7.04
Total		10,371	100.00	

2007 Saskatchewan general election
Party	Candidate	Votes	%	±%
Saskatchewan	Ken Cheveldayoff	6,884	61.80	+17.06
NDP	Gord Bedient	3,060	27.47	-11.52
Liberal	Karen Parhar	959	8.61	-7.66
Green	Cameron McRae	236	2.12	+2.12
Total		11,139	100.00	

2003 Saskatchewan general election
Party	Candidate	Votes	%	±%
Saskatchewan	Ken Cheveldayoff	4,005	44.74	–
NDP	Russell Scott	3,490	38.99	–
Liberal	Shawn Flett	1,457	16.27	–
Total		8,952	100.00	

== See also ==
- List of Saskatchewan provincial electoral districts
- List of Saskatchewan general elections
- Canadian provincial electoral districts
