= Rosthern-Shellbrook =

Provincial electoral district in Saskatchewan, Canada

Coordinates: 53°00′N 107°10′W

Saskatchewan electoral district

Provincial electoral district
- Legislature: Legislative Assembly of Saskatchewan
MLA
Scott Moe
Saskatchewan
- District created: 2002
- First contested: 2003
- Last contested: 2020

Demographics
- Electors: 11,022
- Census division(s): Division 12, 15, 16

Rosthern-Shellbrook is a provincial electoral district for the Legislative Assembly of Saskatchewan, Canada. The riding was last contested in the 2020 election, when incumbent Saskatchewan Party MLA and Premier Scott Moe was re-elected.

Communities in the district include the towns of Rosthern, Shellbrook, Hafford, Blaine Lake, and Spiritwood; and the villages of Canwood, Laird, Medstead, Leask, and Shell Lake.

== History ==
The constituency was created in 2002 from portions of Shellbrook-Spiritwood, Redberry Lake, and Rosthern, and was first contested in the 2003 general election. Rosthern-Shellbrook will gain significant territory from Biggar-Sask Valley for the next general election, in what will be the riding's first major boundary reconfiguration since its creation.

== Members of the Legislative Assembly ==
Legislature	Years	Member	Party
25th	2003 – 2007	Denis Allchurch	Saskatchewan Party
26th	2007 – 2011	Denis Allchurch	Saskatchewan Party
27th	2011 – 2016	Scott Moe	Saskatchewan Party
28th	2016 – 2020	Scott Moe	Saskatchewan Party
29th	2020 – 2024	Scott Moe	Saskatchewan Party
30th	2024 – present	Scott Moe	Saskatchewan Party

== Election results ==
2024 Saskatchewan general election
Party	Candidate	Votes	%	±%
Saskatchewan	Scott Moe	5,279	64.18	-15.36
New Democratic	Mark Thunderchild	1,826	22.20	+6.06
Saskatchewan United	Cody Lockhart	1,031	12.53	
Green	Janice Dongworth	89	1.08	-1.09
Total valid votes		8,225		
Total rejected ballots				
Turnout				
Eligible voters				
Saskatchewan hold		Swing		
Source: Elections Saskatchewan

2020 Saskatchewan general election
Party	Candidate	Votes	%	±%
Saskatchewan	Scott Moe	5,341	79.54	+7.96
New Democratic	Trina Miller	1,084	16.14	-3.37
Green	Larry Neufeld	146	2.17	+0.37
Progressive Conservative	Yvonne Choquette	144	2.15	–
Total valid votes		6,715	99.67	
Total rejected ballots		22	0.33	–
Turnout		6,737	–	–
Eligible voters		–		
Saskatchewan hold		Swing		–
Source: Elections Saskatchewan, Global News

2016 Saskatchewan general election
Party	Candidate	Votes	%	±%
Saskatchewan	Scott Moe	4,724	71.58	+6.52
New Democratic	Rose Freeman	1,288	19.51	-12.33
Liberal	Orrin Murray Greyeyes	468	7.09	-
Green	Jade Duckett	119	1.80	-1.30
Total valid votes		6,599	100.0	
Eligible voters		–		
Saskatchewan hold		Swing		–
Source: Elections Saskatchewan, Global News

2011 Saskatchewan general election: Rosthern-Shellbrook
Party	Candidate	Votes	%	±%
Saskatchewan	Scott Moe	4,442	65.06	+7.56
NDP	Clay DeBray	2,174	31.84	-3.67
Green	Margaret-Rose Uvery	212	3.10	+0.83
Total		6,828	100.00	
Saskatchewan hold		Swing		–

2007 Saskatchewan general election: Rosthern-Shellbrook
Party	Candidate	Votes	%	±%
Saskatchewan	Denis Allchurch	4,134	57.50	+6.81
NDP	Ron Blocka	2,553	35.51	-1.03
Liberal	Linda Neher	339	4.72	-5.79
Green	Margaret-Rose Uvery	163	2.27	–
Total		7,189	100.00	
Saskatchewan hold		Swing		–

2003 Saskatchewan general election
Party	Candidate	Votes	%
Saskatchewan	Denis Allchurch	3,421	48.36
New Democratic	John Serheinko	2,585	36.54
Liberal	George Cameron	744	10.52
Western Independence	Laverne Isaac	324	4.58
Total		7,074	100.00
Source: Saskatchewan Archives Board – Election Results by Electoral Division, pg. 2.14–101

== See also ==
- List of Saskatchewan provincial electoral districts
- List of Saskatchewan general elections
- Canadian provincial electoral districts
