= University of Alberta Botanic Garden =

Botanical garden in Alberta, Canada

- Devonian Botanic Garden (1959–2017)
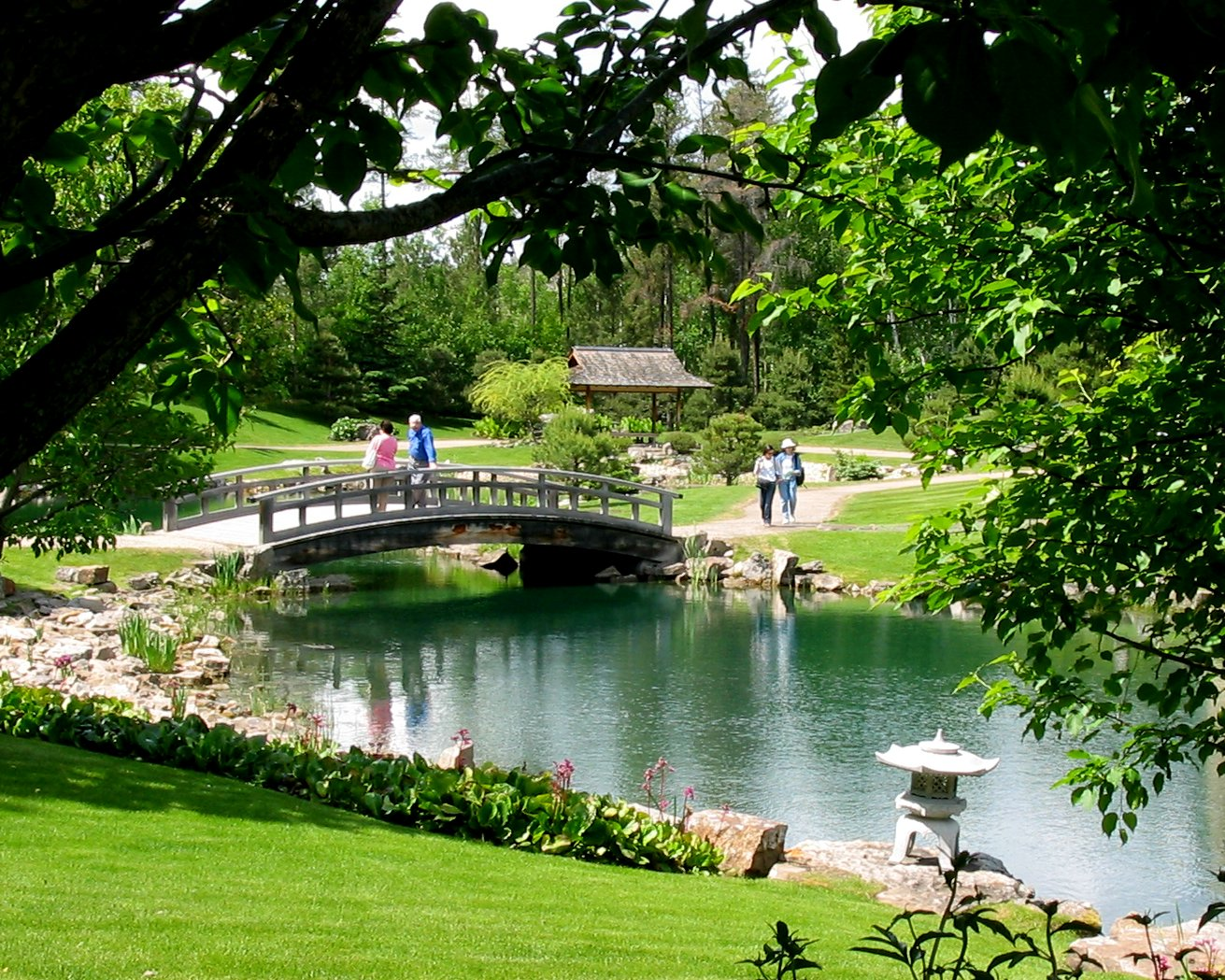
- Water feature and bridge in the Japanese garden
- Interactive map of University of Alberta Botanic Garden
- Type: Arboreta/Botanic gardens
- Location: Parkland County, Alberta
- Nearest city: Edmonton, Alberta
- Coordinates: 53.4081°N 113.7568°W
- Area: 0.97 km^{2} (0.37 mi^{2})
- Created: 1959
- Operator: University of Alberta
- Visitors: 70,000 (2018)
- Open: May 1–September 1
- Website: ualberta.ca/en/botanic-garden/index.html

The University of Alberta Botanic Garden (formerly the Devonian Botanic Garden) is Alberta's largest botanical garden. It was established in 1959 by the University of Alberta. It is located approximately 11.5 km (7.1 mi) from the west edge of the city of Edmonton and 5.9 km (3.7 mi) north of the town of Devon, in Parkland County.

== History ==
The garden was created in 1959 and established on donated land.

The garden was originally designated the "Botanic Garden and Field Laboratory" of the department of botany at the U of A. In the 1970s, after the garden was severely damaged by floods, a donation from the Devonian Foundation, along with funds raised by the Friends of the Garden, helped to repair the damage, create a system of canals and ponds, construct a headquarters building, and purchase more land. In recognition of the donation, the name was changed to the Devonian Botanic Garden.

The Friends of the Devonian Botanic Garden was founded in 1971 as a fundraising group to support the aims and objectives of the garden.

In conjunction with an enhanced memorandum of understanding signed between the Aga Khan University and the University of Alberta in 2009, the University of Alberta requested the Aga Khan IV to develop an Islamic garden within the grounds. Planning the garden took nearly a decade, and construction lasted 18 months. It was designed by the architectural firm Nelson Byrd Woltz Landscape Architects. The Aga Khan garden opened to the public in July 2018, and its Diwan Pavilion was opened in 2022.

Throughout the 2018 season, gardeners completed the planting of over 25,000 new perennials, trees, shrubs, and wetland plants, and add finishing touches on landscaping. The total cost of the Aga Khan Garden was $25 million. The garden is tagged as the "most northerly Islamic garden in the world".

The botanical facility was renamed as the University of Alberta Botanic Garden in 2017. In September 2017, it invested $4.9 million to renovate its front entrance and parking lot.

== Features ==
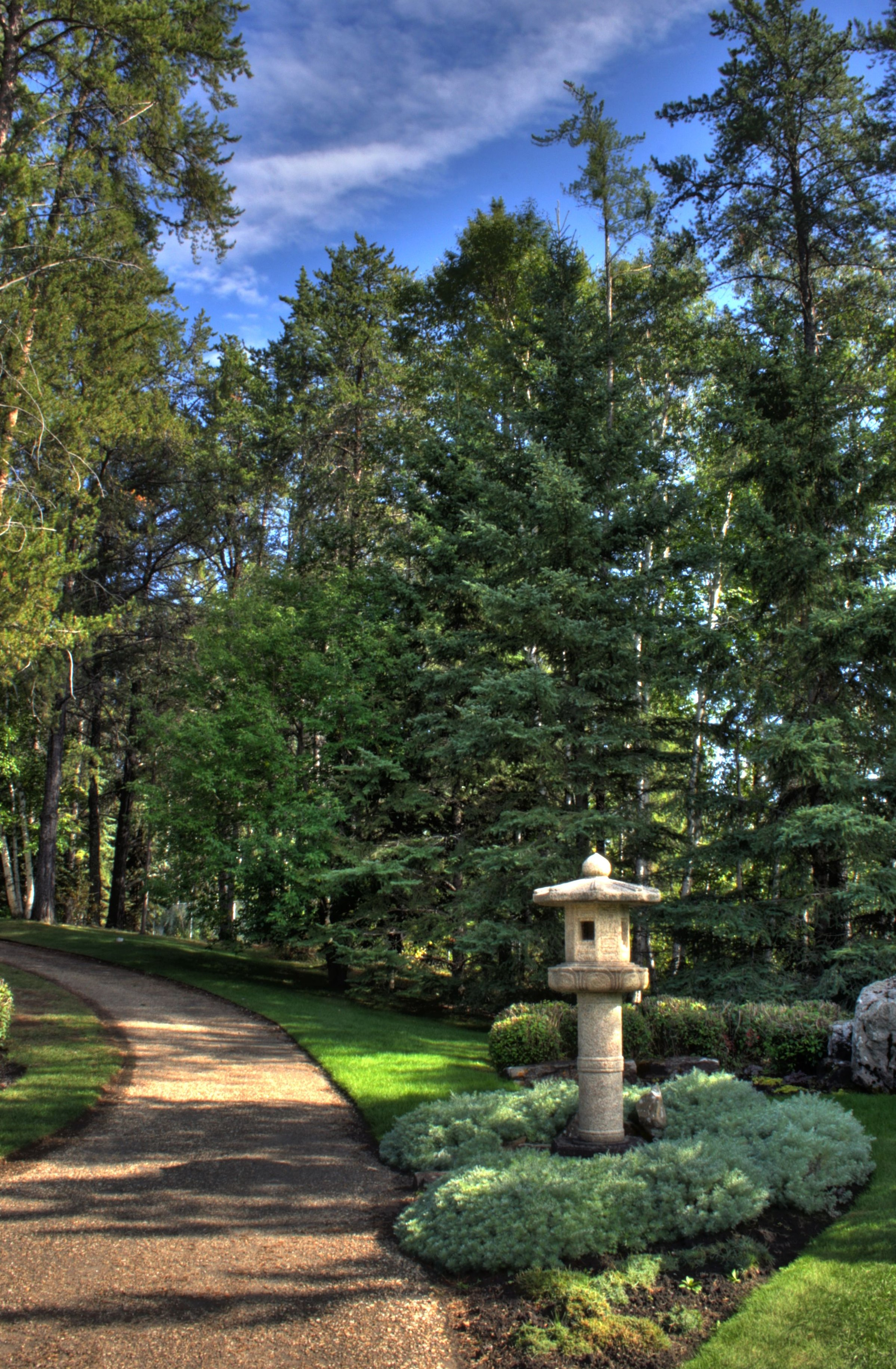
A lamp and forest path in the Japanese garden

The gardens extend over 32 ha (80 acres) of 12,000-year-old sand dune shoreline of pre-glacial Lake Edmonton and include an additional 65 ha (160 acres) of natural areas. They are linked to the North Saskatchewan River via the Parkland County trail.

Highlights of the garden include:

- The Aga Khan Garden features secluded forest paths, fruit orchards, and more than 25,000 trees, shrubs, perennials, annuals, and wetland plants.
- The Kurimoto Japanese Garden is a five-acre space with ornaments and structures such as lanterns, a pagoda, a traditional Japanese entrance gate, a belfry, and more.
- The Patrick Seymour Alpine Garden is a five-acre space containing plants adapted to grow above mountain treelines.
- The Native Peoples Garden contains plants traditionally used by Indigenous North Americans for medicinal, dietary, and ornamental purposes.
- Dyde House, designed by Arthur Erickson
- The Indoor Showhouses include a tropical, arid, and temperate assortment of plants.
- The University of Alberta Botanic Garden Collections house ornamental plants, fruits, and vegetables.

As a unit of the Faculty of Agricultural, Life and Environmental Sciences, the garden is also a site for research, including plant conservation and diversity. A fully digitized herbarium contains a large collection of bryophyte specimens that is used for research and teaching, as well as horticultural plants grown at the garden.

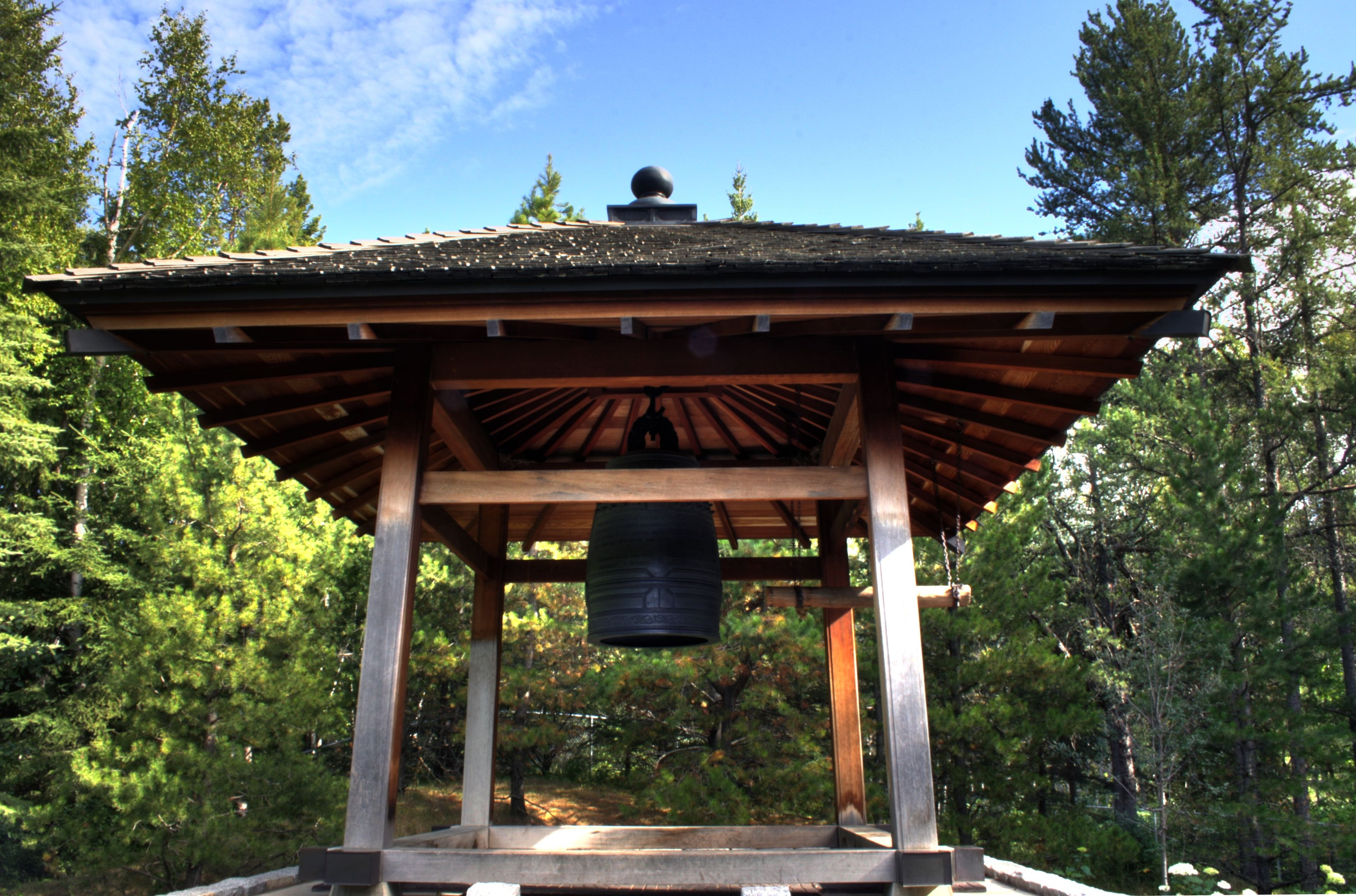
Bell in the Japanese Garden

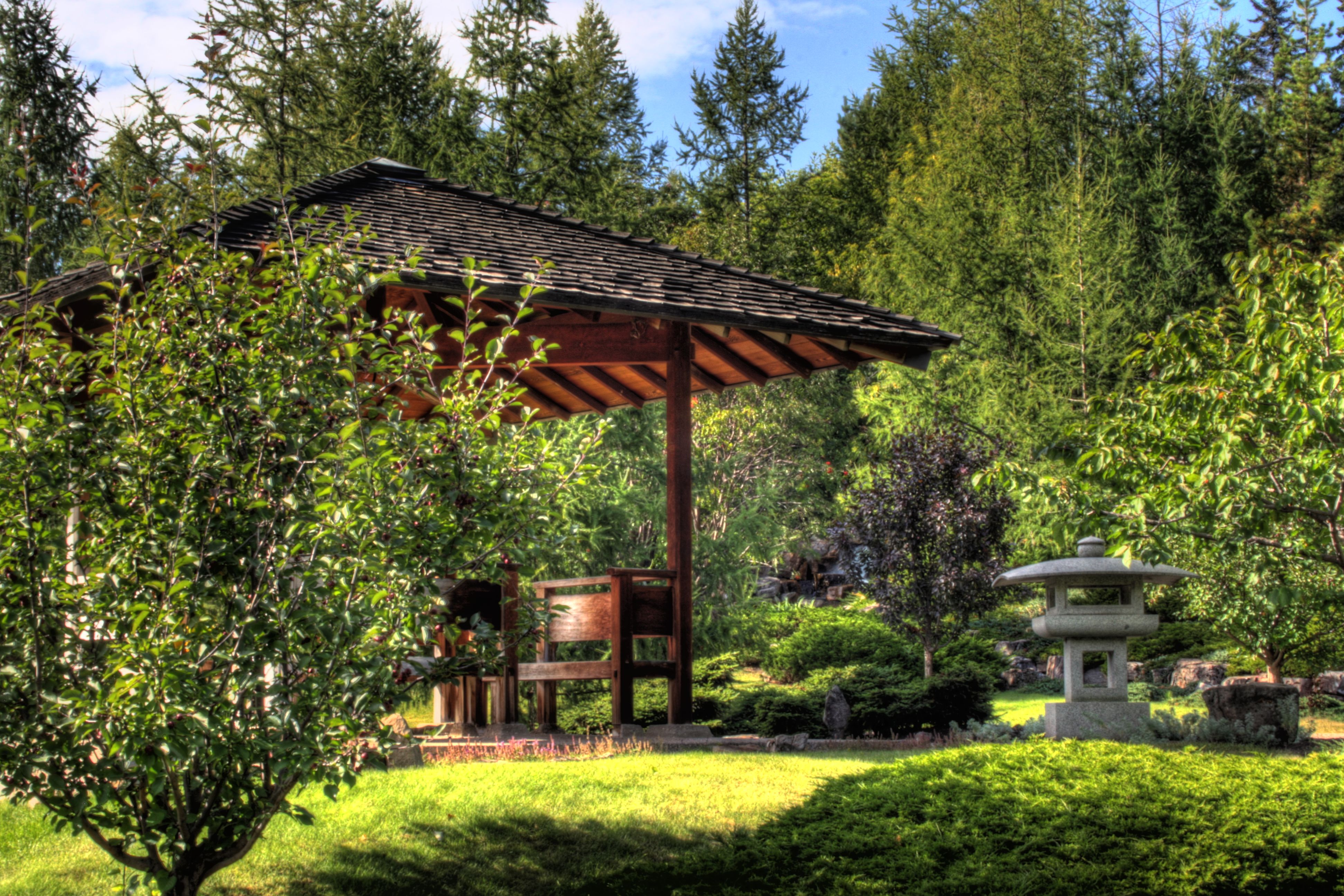
Viewing spot in the Japanese Garden

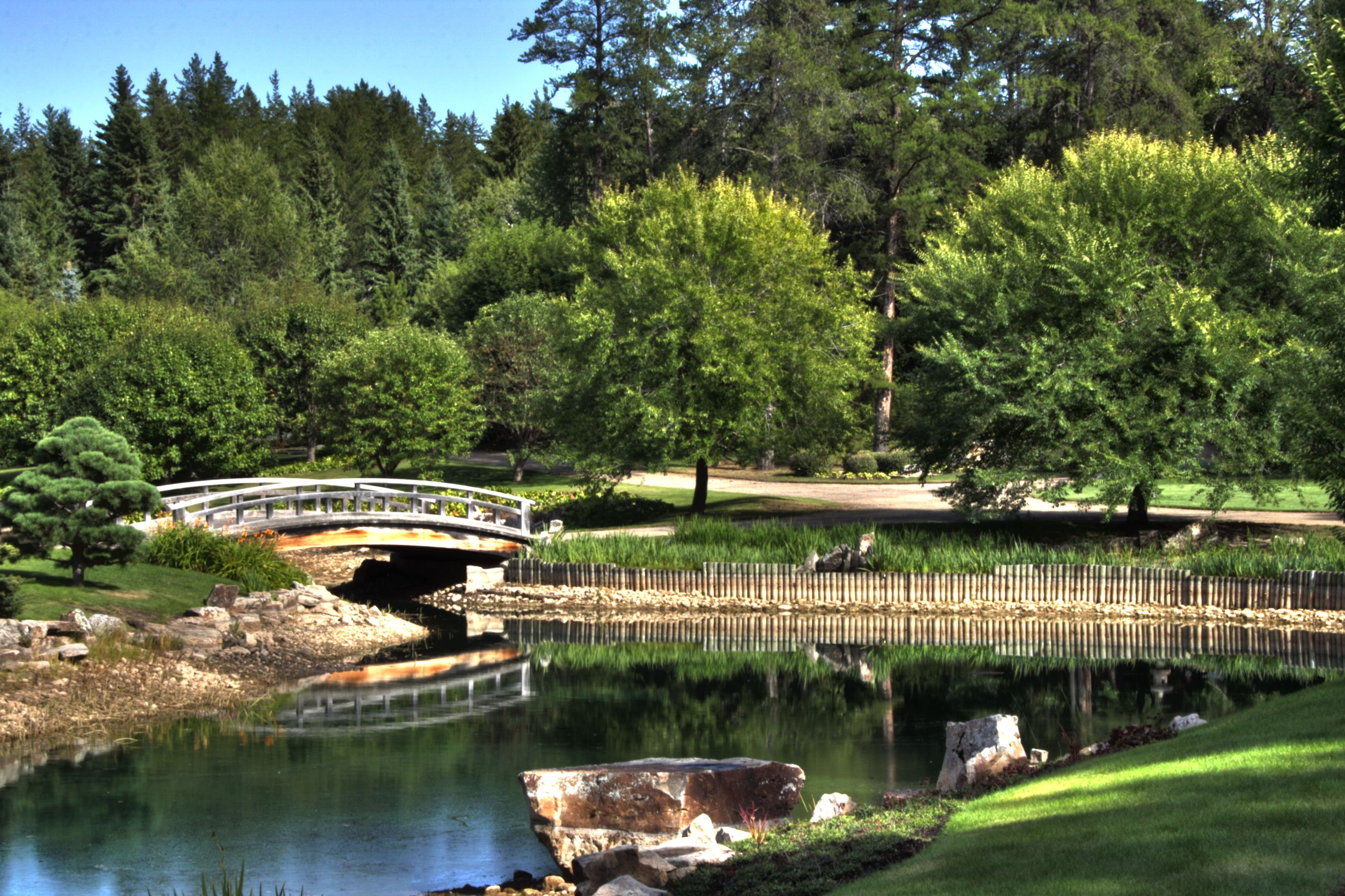
Pond and bridge in the Japanese Garden

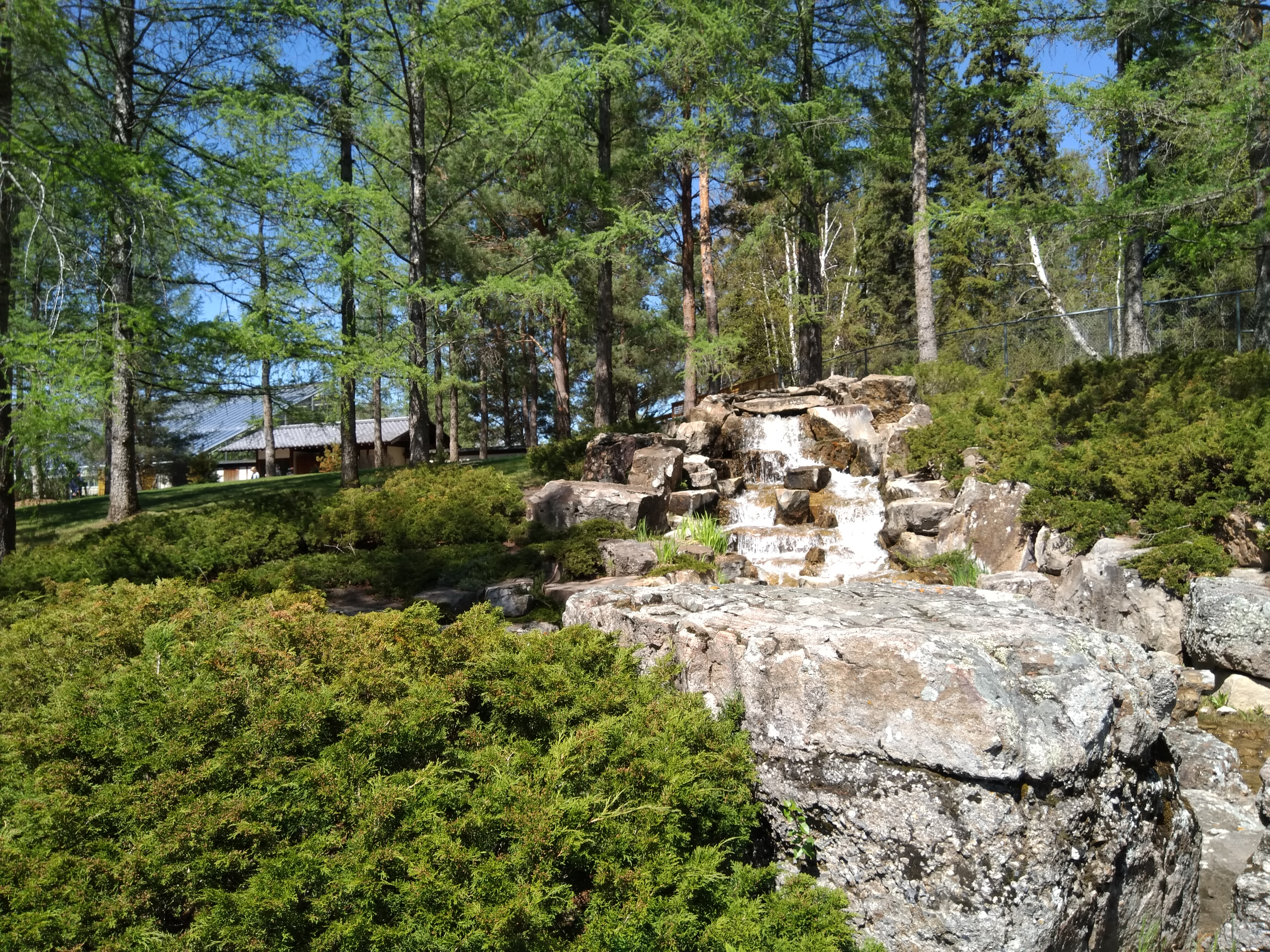
A cascade in the Japanese Garden.

== Awards ==
- 2013: Alberta Emerald Award, for its outdoor environmental education programs
- 2014: Botanical Garden of the Year, awarded by the Canadian Garden Council.

== See also ==
- List of botanical gardens in Canada
