= Rundle's Mission =

Coordinates: 53.0770°N 114.1429°W

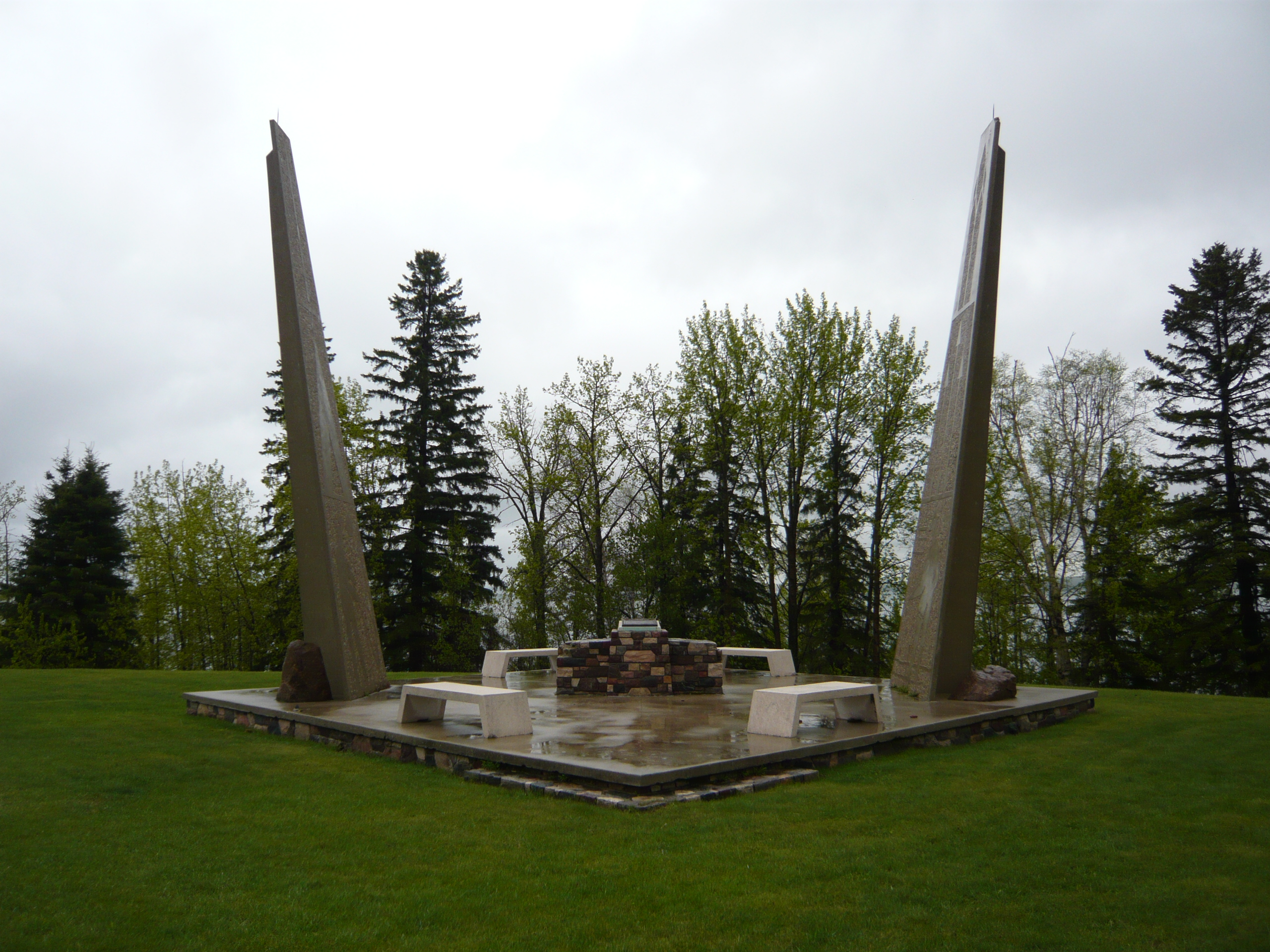
- Interactive map of Rundle's Mission
- Type: Methodist Mission
- Location: Thorsby, Alberta, Canada

History
- Established: 1847
- Founder: Robert Rundle

Site notes
- Governing body: Parks Canada
- Website: "Seeking the story of Mission Beach"

National Historic Site of Canada

Rundle's Mission was established in 1847 on the shores of Pigeon Lake near Thorsby, Alberta, Canada, by a Methodist missionary named Robert Rundle. From the mission Rundle taught Cree people about Christianity and agriculture, refusing to acquiesce to pressures from the Hudson's Bay Company or the government to further influence local First Peoples.

== History ==
In the mid-19th century Pigeon Lake was a gathering place for First Nations peoples and the missionaries who were attempting to convert them to Christianity. After working out of Fort Edmonton from 1840, in 1847 Rev. Robert Rundle received permission to establish a mission on Pigeon Lake from the Hudson's Bay Company and the Wesleyan Missionary Society. After initially focusing on the Assiniboine, Rundle began to focus on the Cree. He translated hymns and biblical scriptures into written and spoken Cree.

There was a Hudson's Bay Company post at the lake, as well as a number of agricultural enterprises fostered by the mission. However, Rundle did not view his role as that of a "company man" or government representative. Instead, he sought to help the Aboriginal people around him survive in the face of incoming European settlement. When the Hudson's Bay Company pressured him to establish mission schools, he spent some time looking for an appropriate site - but intentionally did not establish the mission school.

Robert Rundle permanently departed to England only a year later after he took a bad fall from his horse and seriously injured his arm. When it did not heal properly, he decided to return home to England to seek proper medical attention. After he left, a follower named Benjamin Sinclair took charge, only for the church to be abandoned in 1850. Methodist Reverend Thomas Woolsey opened it for a short time after 1855, and abandoned again due to the area's poor suitability for farming.

== Modern facilities ==
In 1948 the Reverend Dr. Gerald Hutchinson moved to Pigeon Lake, and inquired why a local lake access point was called "Mission Beach". After finding no suitable explanation he spent the next fifty years researching the answer. In 1965, Hutchinson's work exploring Rundle's Mission was recognized, and the site was dedicated as a National Historic Monument; in 1997 the 2-acre (8,100 m^{2}) site where early mission buildings and native burial grounds are located was recognized as The Benjamin and Margaret Sinclair Provincial Historic Site. Rundle's Mission is now held by the Government of Alberta and managed by the nonprofit Rundle's Mission Society. In 2001 Hutchinson was recognized for his work at Rundle's Mission by Museums Alberta with a "Lifetime Achievement" award.

Due directly to Hutchinson's labor, today Rundle's Mission is home to a hand-hewn log lodge, two bungalows and an interpretive boardwalk with a natural artesian spring. There is also a beach area on the lake, called Mission Beach, and a nature reserve next door.

== Bibliography ==
- Hutchinson, G.M. (1990) The Meeting Place: Rundle's Mission at Pigeon Lake. Rundle's Mission Conference Centre.
- Robert Rundle: Writings and excerpts. Heritage Community Foundation Alberta Online Encyclopedia.

== See also ==
- History of Alberta
