= Ken Cheveldayoff =

Canadian provincial politician

The Honourable Ken Cheveldayoff ECS MLA

Member of the Saskatchewan Legislative Assembly for Saskatoon Willowgrove Saskatoon Silver Springs (2003-2016)
- Incumbent
- Assumed office November 5, 2003
- Preceded by: Riding Established

Leader of the Government in the Legislative Assembly of Saskatchewan
- In office June 5, 2014 – August 23, 2016
- Premier: Brad Wall
- Preceded by: Jeremy Harrison
- Succeeded by: Paul Merriman

Dean of the Legislative Assembly of Saskatchewan
- Incumbent
- Assumed office October 28, 2024
- Preceded by: Donna Harpauer

Personal details
- Born: April 1, 1965 (age 61) Saskatoon, Saskatchewan
- Party: Saskatchewan Party
- Other political affiliations: Progressive Conservative Party of Canada
- Spouse: Trish Cheveldayoff (née Lamers) (m. 1996)
- Occupation: Business

Ken Cheveldayoff (born April 1, 1965) is a Canadian provincial politician. He is the Saskatchewan Party member of the Legislative Assembly of Saskatchewan (MLA) for the constituency of Saskatoon Willowgrove. First elected to the Legislative Assembly in 2003, Cheveldayoff has been a cabinet minister in the governments of both Brad Wall and Scott Moe.

== Early life and career ==
Cheveldayoff holds a B.A. (Honours) in Economics and Political Science and a Masters of Business Administration. He was a parliamentary page in the House of Commons and won the Queen Elizabeth II scholarship for excellence in Parliamentary Studies. Prior to being elected to public office, Cheveldayoff worked with Western Economic Diversification as a senior business advisor. He is also the majority shareholder in a real estate company developing several Saskatoon properties.

== Politics ==
=== 1993 federal election ===
Cheveldayoff's first run for political office came in the 1993 Canadian federal election as a member of the Progressive Conservative Party in the riding of The Battlefords—Meadow Lake. The incumbent, Len Taylor of the New Democratic Party, held the seat, with Cheveldayoff finishing fourth.

=== Saskatchewan Party MLA (2003–2017) ===
Ten years after running federally, Cheveldayoff turned to provincial politics with the Saskatchewan Party, a new conservative party that had formed in 1997. First elected in November 2003, Cheveldayoff was the Opposition Critic for Finance, Deputy Critic for Learning, and served on a number of committees. Cheveldayoff was re-elected in the 2007 general election, after which the Saskatchewan Party formed government for the first time, and Cheveldayoff was named to Cabinet by Premier Brad Wall as Minister of Crown Corporations.

In a 2009 cabinet shuffle, he became Minister of Enterprise, and in 2010, he was appointed Minister of First Nations and Métis relations. In 2012, Cheveldayoff was appointed Minister of Environment, Responsible for SaskWater and the Water Security Agency. In 2014, Cheveldayoff was dropped from cabinet but was appointed Government House Leader. In 2016, Cheveldayoff returned to cabinet when he was named Minister of Parks, Culture, Sport and Minister responsible for the Public Service Commission.

=== Sask Party leadership bid (2017–2018) ===
Wall announced that he was retiring from politics on August 10, 2017. On August 23, Cheveldayoff confirmed that he would be resigning from cabinet in order to pursue the Saskatchewan Party leadership. On August 28, Cheveldayoff officially launched his leadership campaign. At his launch, Cheveldayoff stated that he would be willing to consider privatizing provincial crown corporations. While Cheveldayoff called himself a "centrist" and "very much a moderate" at the outset of the race, he drew scrutiny throughout the campaign for his stances on social issues. In a November interview, Cheveldayoff denied that racism was an issue in the province. The same month, Cheveldayoff received the endorsement of a national anti-abortion lobbying group, who rated him the most "pro-life" of all leadership candidates. Cheveldayoff said that he would support "anything that emphasizes that life begins at conception", and stated that not even rape victims should have legal access to abortion services.

At the Saskatchewan Party leadership convention, held on January 27, 2018, Cheveldayoff finished third; he was eliminated on the fourth ballot, having received 30% of votes. The contest was won by Scott Moe.

=== Sask Party MLA (2018–present) ===
Moe was sworn in as the 15th Premier of Saskatchewan on February 2, 2018. Moe named Cheveldayoff to his cabinet as Minister of Central Services and the minister responsible for the public service and provincial capital commission. After he was re-elected in the 2020 general election, Cheveldayoff was dropped from cabinet.

The 2024 general election saw Cheveldayoff win his sixth consecutive term, making him the assembly’s current longest-serving member. Cheveldayoff was the only Saskatchewan Party candidate to win or retain a seat in either of the province's major urban centres, narrowly winning the Saskatoon Willowgrove seat over New Democratic Party challenger Alana Wakula by a margin of 136 votes. After the election, Cheveldayoff returned to cabinet as Minister of Advanced Education.

== Personal life ==
Cheveldayoff’s wife Trish formerly worked as a news anchor at CTV Saskatoon. The couple have two children. Cheveldayoff and his family are members of various community organizations, along with the Lakeview Free Methodist Church.

Cheveldayoff is the older brother of Kevin Cheveldayoff, the general manager of the National Hockey League's Winnipeg Jets. On May 20, 2018, Cheveldayoff was photographed trying to sell tickets outside a Jets home playoff game; he stated that he had bought the tickets for a friend, but when the friend could not use the tickets, he sold them on the street.

== Electoral history ==
=== Provincial ===
2024 Saskatchewan general election: Saskatoon Willowgrove
Party	Candidate	Votes	%	±%
Saskatchewan	Ken Cheveldayoff	4,895	49.02	-19.38
New Democratic	Alana Wakula	4,759	47.66	+17.66
Saskatchewan United	William Hughes	251	2.51	–
Green	Tawe Morin	80	0.80	-0.80
Total valid votes		9,985	98.88	
Total rejected ballots		113	1.12	
Turnout		10,098	64.58	
Eligible voters		15,637		
Saskatchewan hold		Swing		
Source: Elections Saskatchewan

2020 Saskatchewan general election: Saskatoon Willowgrove
Party	Candidate	Votes	%
Saskatchewan	Ken Cheveldayoff	7,509	66.38
New Democratic	Kaitlyn Harvey	3,600	31.82
Green	David Greenfield	203	1.80
Total		11,312	100.0
Source: Elections Saskatchewan

2016 Saskatchewan general election: Saskatoon Willowgrove
Party	Candidate	Votes	%
Saskatchewan	Ken Cheveldayoff	6,603	72.10
New Democratic	Tajinder Grewal	2,196	23.98
Liberal	Jason Gorin	229	2.50
Green	Sarah Risk	129	1.40
Total		9,157	100.0
Source: Saskatchewan Archives - Election Results by Electoral Division; Elections Saskatchewan

2011 Saskatchewan general election: Saskatoon Silver Springs
Party	Candidate	Votes	%
Saskatchewan	Ken Cheveldayoff	7,736	74.59
New Democratic	Cindy Lee Sherban	2,242	21.62
Green	D'Arcy Hande	230	2.22
Liberal	Rod Stoesz	163	1.57
Total		10,371	100.0
Source: Saskatchewan Archives - Election Results by Electoral Division

2007 Saskatchewan general election: Saskatoon Silver Springs
Party	Candidate	Votes	%
Saskatchewan	Ken Cheveldayoff	6,884	61.80
New Democratic	Gord Bedient	3,060	27.47
Liberal	Karen Parhar	959	8.61
Green	Cameron McRae	236	2.12
Total		11,139	100.0
Source: Saskatchewan Archives - Election Results by Electoral Division

2003 Saskatchewan general election: Saskatoon Silver Springs
Party	Candidate	Votes	%
Saskatchewan	Ken Cheveldayoff	4,005	44.74
New Democratic	Russell Scott	3,490	38.99
Liberal	Shawn Flett	1,457	16.27
Total		8,952	100.0
Source: Saskatchewan Archives - Election Results by Electoral Division

=== Federal ===
1993 Canadian federal election: The Battlefords—Meadow Lake
Party	Candidate	Votes	%
New Democratic	Len Taylor	9,772	31.23
Reform	Delon Bleakney	9,043	28.90
Liberal	Neil Currie	7,364	23.54
Progressive Conservative	Ken Cheveldayoff	4,299	13.74
Independent	Chretien, Leon W.	609	1.95
Canada Party	Peter Franklin	202	0.65
Total		31,289	100.00
Source: Parliament of Canada

== Cabinet positions ==
Saskatchewan provincial government of Scott Moe
Cabinet posts (2)
Predecessor	Office	Successor
Colleen Young	Minister of Advanced Education; November 7, 2024 –	Incumbent
Christine Tell	Minister of Central Services; February 2, 2018 – November 9, 2020	Ministry Abolished
Saskatchewan provincial government of Brad Wall
Cabinet posts (5)
Predecessor	Office	Successor
Mark Docherty	Minister of Parks, Culture and Sport; August 23, 2016 – August 28, 2017	Gene Makowsky
Dustin Duncan	Minister of Environment; May 25, 2012 – June 5, 2014	Scott Moe
Bill Hutchinson	Minister of First Nations and Métis Relations; June 29, 2010 – May 25, 2012	Jim Reiter
Jeremy Harrison	Minister of Enterprise; May 29, 2009 – June 29, 2010	Lyle Stewart
Ministry Established	Minister of Crown Corporations; November 21, 2007 – May 29, 2009	Ministry Abolished
