= Saskatchewan Party =

Provincial political party in Canada

- Abbreviation: SP; Sask Party
- Leader: Scott Moe
- President: Joe Hargrave
- Founded: August 8, 1997; 29 years ago
- Registered: September 17, 1997; 29 years ago
- Split from: Progressive Conservative Party; Liberal Party
- Headquarters: 6135 Rochdale Boulevard; Regina, Saskatchewan; S4X 2R1
- Membership: ▲27,125 (2017)
- Ideology: Conservatism (Canadian); Economic liberalism
- Political position: Centre-right to right-wing
- Colours: Green
- Seats in Legislature: 34 / 61

Website
- www.saskparty.com

The Saskatchewan Party (SP or Sask Party) is a conservative political party in the Canadian province of Saskatchewan. The party was founded in 1997 by a coalition of former provincial Progressive Conservative and Liberal Party members who sought to unite opposition to the governing New Democratic Party. Since 2007, the Saskatchewan Party has been the province's governing party, and both the party and the province are currently led by Premier Scott Moe.

Since first being elected to a majority government in 2007, the Saskatchewan Party has enjoyed a run of electoral success not seen in the province since the days of Tommy Douglas's Co-operative Commonwealth Federation. In 2024, the SP was elected to its fifth consecutive majority government, a feat not achieved since the CCF led five majority governments between 1944 and 1964. This success has led observers to declare the SP the province's new natural governing party.

Brad Wall was the first SP leader to become Premier in 2007. The party took power at a time of soaring natural resource prices, which helped to spur economic and population growth. A downturn in resource prices beginning in 2014 created challenges for the province's economy, and in the years since the provincial debt has reached historic levels. Wall announced his retirement in 2017 and he was succeeded by Moe in 2018. Under Wall's early leadership, the SP was considered to be a centre-right party, albeit one with a neoliberal and Christian conservative basis. In later years (and particularly under Moe's leadership), the party is considered to have taken a turn further to the right. Under both premiers, and especially since the election of a Liberal federal government in 2015, the party has increasingly focused its attention on the federal government and espoused sentiments of western alienation within the Canadian federation.

== History ==
=== Party foundations (1997–1998) ===
The Saskatchewan Party arose from a distinct political climate in the 1990s. The Progressive Conservatives led two consecutive majority governments from 1982 to 1991 under the leadership of Grant Devine. However, economic challenges, the party's profligate spending (which left the province on the brink of bankruptcy), a close association with Brian Mulroney's unpopular federal PCs, and a major expense fraud scandal that resulted in prison time for several members of the party all severely damaged the PCs. Under the leadership of Bill Boyd, the PCs lost nearly half of their vote share in 1995 compared to 1991, and the party was reduced to five MLAs. The Liberal Party, meanwhile, despite returning to Official Opposition status in 1995 for the first time since 1975, was being weakened by internal disputes. The New Democratic Party (NDP) under Roy Romanow took power in 1991, and rapidly addressed the fiscal crisis, balancing the province's finances by 1995. However, this process involved numerous cuts to services that were seen as disproportionately affecting rural residents, deepening an urban-rural divide in the province that had already been widened by the PC emphasis on rural issues throughout the 1980s.

With neither the PCs nor the Liberals seeing a clear path to defeating the NDP, discussions about a merger began within the caucuses in July 1997. Although unsuccessful at first, four MLAs from each party, all representing rural districts, agreed to walk away from their parties and form a new one. In August 1997, PC MLAs Boyd, Dan D'Autremont, Ben Heppner, and Don Toth joined former Liberal MLAs Bob Bjornerud, June Draude, Rod Gantefoer, and Ken Krawetz in announcing the founding of the Saskatchewan Party. The new party was officially registered on September 17, and with eight sitting MLAs, took over the status of Official Opposition. Krawetz, who had been serving as the leader of the Opposition with the Liberals, maintained that role when he became the interim leader of the new party. Its formation was challenged by Reform Party members who planned to establish a provincial affiliate, accusing the new party of performative populism. Concerned about possible right-wing competition, the November founding convention adopted grassroots provisions on voter recall, fixed election dates, free votes for party MLAs and referendums on abortion and VLT. While the SP embraced some Reform Party policies and thereby won the favour of their political operatives, its formulation has been described as a movement by political elites.

Neither the PCs nor the Liberals disbanded after this merger of former party MLAs. However, while the Liberals ran a full slate of candidates in the 1999 election, with four being elected, the Progressive Conservatives effectively went dormant, running only paper candidates to keep the party registered over the next election cycles. This, along with the broad migration of PC members and staff to the new party, led to accusations by the NDP and the Liberal Party that the new party was merely a rebranding of the scandal-plagued PCs. Romanow often referred to the new party as the "Saskatories".

=== Elwin Hermanson (1998–2004) ===
In April 1998, former Member of Parliament and Reform Party house leader Elwin Hermanson was elected the party's first leader. Hermanson defeated former Liberal MLA Gantefoer and political newcomer Yogi Huyghebaert for the position. Since Hermanson did not have a seat in the legislature, Krawetz remained as interim house Opposition leader. The new leader stated that while people "know I have the best interests of the agriculture industry and rural Saskatchewan at heart because that's where I still live", the new party was "not anti-urban." Hermanson declined to run in a 1998 Saskatoon by-election, instead waiting for the next general election to run for a seat. Under Hermanson, the party put forward an ambitious fiscal conservative platform, calling for major corporate and income tax cuts. These policies were joined by a number of controversial and social conservative policies, from a commitment to consider privatizing crown corporations to work-for-welfare policies and an end to public affirmative action. Limited attention was paid to federal-provincial relations, while proposing to Romanow and Melenchuck to act as a "united front" to exert pressure on agricultural issues.

Hermanson led the fledgling party into its first election in 1999 on this platform. The party had a strong showing, narrowly edging out the NDP in the popular vote and sweeping rural districts across the province, demonstrating the growing cleavage between urban and rural areas; the party won only a single urban seat. Overall, the SP won 25 seats and reduced the NDP—which won 29—to a minority government.

The party acknowledged the need to broaden its appeal to urban areas, and discussed moderating its social conservative image. It tabled or defeated motions at its annual conventions dealing with taxation of Indigenous residents and publicly funded abortions. Ahead of the 2003 provincial election, the party again campaigned on a platform of tax reductions and decreased government involvement in the economy. However, it remained bogged down by questions about its conservatism and in particular its plans for crown corporations, with Hermanson continuing to state that he would be willing to entertain offers for them. The SP still led polling going into the election, and ultimately increased its seat count to 28. However, the NDP increased its share of the vote and won 30 seats, returning to a majority. The result was seen as a major letdown for the Saskatchewan Party, and Hermanson resigned as leader shortly afterward.

=== Brad Wall (2004–2018) ===
==== In opposition (2004–2007) ====
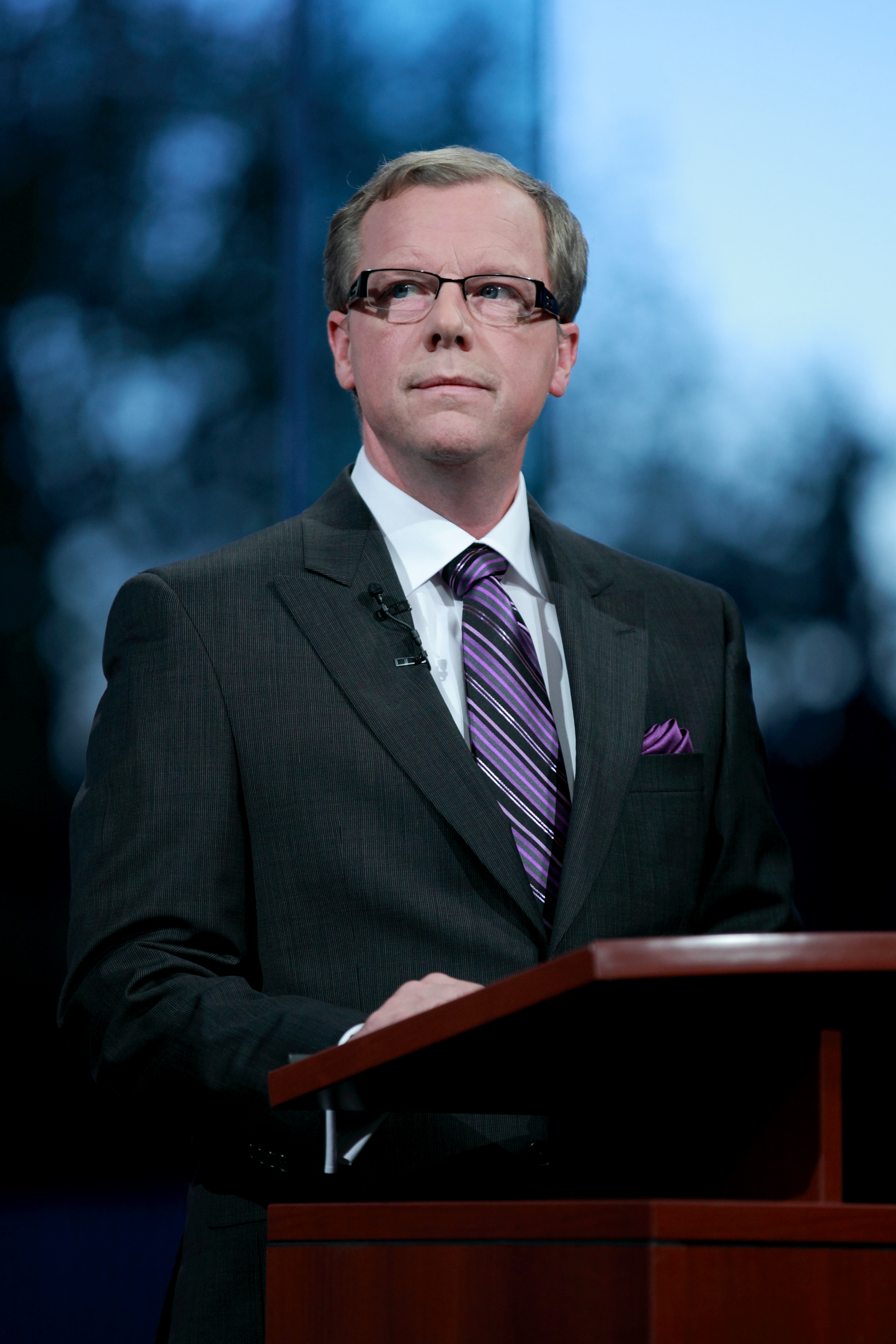
Brad Wall was acclaimed Sask. Party leader in 2004, and became the first SP premier in 2007.

Brad Wall, a former ministerial assistant in the Devine government who helped launch the party and was first elected as a MLA for Swift Current in 1999, was acclaimed as the new party leader on March 15, 2004 after no one else entered the race to succeed Hermanson. Wall launched a review of party policies with a view to moderating the party's image. Through the review, the party abandoned many of its social conservative policies, such as "boot camp" correctional sentences and any discussion of abortions. Reform-based populist policies were removed, with the exception of fixed election dates. Wall instead focused on economic issues and improvements to healthcare. Still facing questions about the Progressive Conservative expense fraud scandal, the party also drafted a Code of Ethics in 2006, intending to commit members to a standard of ethical conduct under threat of suspension. When it was revealed in 2006 that the party had received a $10,000 donation from Imperial Tobacco, Wall created a policy banning such donations. In the lead-up to the 2007 election, Wall also sought to put to rest fears about privatization, stating that "Crowns are not going to be privatized and (subsidiaries) are not going to be wound down".

In 2007, the Saskatchewan Party was sued by the Progressive Conservatives over access to the nearly-$3 million PC trust fund. The PCs alleged the fund's trustees—three of whom were active in the Saskatchewan Party—conspired with the Saskatchewan Party to deny them access to their funds as they tried to re-launch the party from its dormancy. The case was not settled until 2014, when PC leader Rick Swenson announced that his party had been given control of the fund.

By 2007, Wall's efforts to broaden the party's appeal appeared poised to pay off. In the 2007 provincial election on November 7, the Saskatchewan Party won 38 seats to form a majority government, making Wall the province's 14th premier.

==== Majority government (2007–2018) ====
By all accounts, the Saskatchewan Party formed government at an opportune time, inheriting a strong economy buoyed by still-rising commodity prices, including oil, potash, and agricultural products. Wall's government immediately used rising revenues to institute significant tax cuts, particularly income tax cuts, and to service debt reduction—in its first full fiscal year, the government paid down close to $3 billion in debt. The government released a plan for growth, calling for annually balanced budgets and for provincial debt to be halved by 2017. However, the government's next three budgets ran deficits. The government also explored the idea of setting up a new "rainy day fund", something the NDP had done in the 1970s, building an investment fund out of windfall resource prices; the government ultimately opted not to, despite the report it commissioned recommending it do so.

Wall's government also immediately introduced labour reforms with two bills in 2007, with one restricting unionization and the other the right to strike for more than 65,000 workers deemed to be working in "essential services". The latter law faced legal challenges, and in 2015 the Supreme Court of Canada ruled that the law was unconstitutional. Although Wall suggested a willingness to use the notwithstanding clause to keep the law, the government never did so.

In 2010, Wall and his government rose to national prominence for their opposition to a proposed takeover of Saskatoon-based PotashCorp—the world's largest potash producer—by Australian mining company BHP. The proposed deal, worth nearly $40 billion, stood to become the largest takeover in Canadian history. However, Wall argued that the province would lose significant resource revenues, and that the takeover was against Canada's strategic interests. The federal government blocked the deal.

The Saskatchewan Party government also significantly increased immigration to the province, making it a central policy goal, bolstering a process that had begun under the NDP—the revamped immigration process was laid out in a report written by former MLA Pat Lorje. Consequently, most of the population growth observed in the province since 2007 is attributable to immigration; inter-provincial migration has remained a net loss for the province. One area in which the Saskatchewan Party did not follow the NDPs lead was in renewable energy. Former MLA Peter Prebble had helped to launch an energy conservation office and written a report outlining a path to increased renewable energy development, but these initiatives were halted by Wall's government.

During this term, the Saskatchewan Party began pursuing privatization of some of its assets. It sold its 49% share of SaskFerco, a significant nitrogen fertilizer producer; it began contracting out SaskTel and internal information technology services; it instructed crowns to divest of out-of-province holdings and investments; it introduced SaskBuilds to pursue public-private partnerships on infrastructure development; and it began introducing limited private-sector involvement in the healthcare system. The government also applied the Lean program, designed to find cost savings, to the health care system; a 2016 report found that the controversial program cost the province more than $1,500 for every dollar saved. In 2012, the province also began providing public funding to independent private schools; while such private schools are expected to teach the provincial curriculum, it has been reported that a number of Christian private schools employ the controversial Accelerated Christian Education curriculum.

In the 2011 provincial election, Wall and the Saskatchewan Party won a landslide victory, winning 49 of 58 seats and more than 60% of the popular vote—the highest share in the province's history. It was during this second term that a bust in commodity prices would begin to strain provincial finances, although some of the most serious effects would not become clear for several years. In fact, in 2014—the year of a significant oil price crash—the province was awarded a AAA credit rating. It was also during this term that Justin Trudeau's Liberals formed a majority federal government, which led to frequent clashes between Regina and Ottawa. Shortly after the new federal government announced a plan to bring 25,000 Syrian refugees to Canada, Wall wrote to Trudeau and asked him to suspend the program, citing security concerns. Another significant development during the term was the opening of a carbon capture facility at the Boundary Dam coal power plant in Estevan, the first such industrial-scale facility in the world. Throughout this term, Wall persistently polled as the most popular premier in the country.

Wall and the Saskatchewan Party won a third term in the 2016 provincial election, with results closely aligning with the previous election. The Party was faced with major challenges early in this term, including a significant scandal involving questionable land deals during the development of the Global Transportation Hub, an inland port outside of Regina. Concerns resulted in an RCMP investigation, and although no criminal charges were laid, the Party refused to launch a public inquiry and made efforts to keep GTH-related information from the public. By 2020, the GTH had fallen $46 million into debt. Also during this term, the province frequently clashed with the federal government over resource and climate change policy. Saskatchewan refused to sign onto the Pan-Canadian climate change framework, leaving millions of dollars of funding on the table. In particular, the government expressed staunch opposition to the imposition of a federal carbon tax.

By 2017, the economic challenges facing the province became more clear. Although the government had had success in paying down debt in its early years, debt had risen to nearly $15 billion. The province's credit rating was downgraded to AA. The Saskatchewan Party responded with a severe austerity budget in 2017—which ran the sixth deficit out of ten budgets since 2007—introducing expansions to the provincial sales tax and cuts to spending in a wide range of areas, including education, social services, libraries—the only cuts the province reversed in response to public protests—and grants to municipalities. The budget also brought the closure of the Saskatchewan Transportation Company. The budget was criticized for its disproportionate impact on the public sector, with corporate taxes remaining low. The unpopularity of the budget translated to Wall and the Saskatchewan Party, and in August Wall announced that he would be retiring from politics, with a plan to step away when a new leader was chosen and sworn in as premier in early 2018.

=== Scott Moe (2018–present) ===
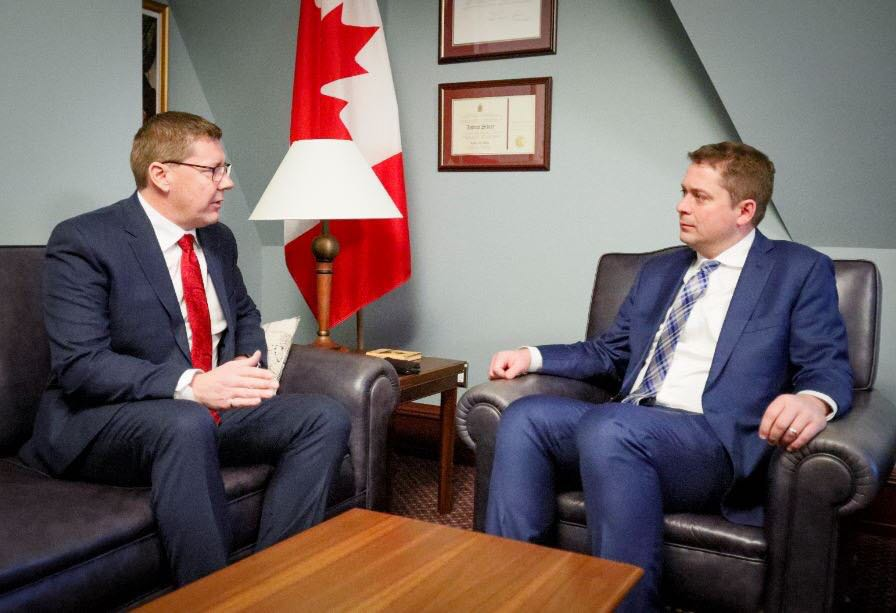
Scott Moe succeeded Wall as party leader and premier in 2018. He is seen here with federal Conservative leader Andrew Scheer.

The leadership race to succeed Wall as premier ultimately featured five candidates: first-term Regina MLA Tina Beaudry-Mellor; veteran Saskatoon MLA Ken Cheveldayoff, civil servant Alanna Koch, who had served as the deputy minister to the premier; MLA and environment minister Scott Moe; and another veteran Saskatoon MLA, Gordon Wyant. A sixth candidate, former MP Rob Clarke, withdrew from the race, but his name still appeared on the ballot. At the party's 2018 leadership convention, Moe was elected leader on the fifth ballot. He was sworn in as premier on February 2, 2018.

Under Moe's leadership, the Saskatchewan Party has continued its focus on federal relations, charging the federal Liberal government with harming the province's economic interests. Only weeks after he took office, Moe's government challenged the federal carbon tax in court, which ultimately made its way to the Supreme Court. In March 2021, the tax was ruled to be constitutional. Moe has consistently called for greater provincial autonomy, calling for a "New Deal with Canada" and referring to Saskatchewan as a "nation within a nation", and asserting a desire for more control over taxation, immigration, and policing. In October 2022, the party issued a white paper on its stance against "federal intrusion". The following month, the party passed the Saskatchewan First Act into law; the act reasserts provincial jurisdiction over natural resources. The act is currently facing a legal challenge by Onion Lake First Nation.

The Saskatchewan Party government led the province's response to the COVID-19 pandemic, rejecting an early call for the establishment of an all-party committee, including non-partisan experts. While the government instituted a broad range of public health measures throughout much of the first two years of the pandemic, the province was twice the first in Canada to lift all pandemic-related public health mandates, first in July 2021, and then in February 2022. Particularly once vaccines became widely available, Moe argued that the need for public health measures was diminished. By early 2022, Moe was vocal in his support of people protesting public health mandates, including the convoy that occupied downtown Ottawa. Overall, Saskatchewan was one of the hardest hit provinces; the provincial health care system was heavily strained by the pandemic, and Moe's government was accused of failing to follow the recommendations of its public health officers.

In early 2020, Moe considered calling a snap election, despite the fixed election law that the party passed in 2008. However, the 2020 provincial election ultimately proceeded in the fall, and the Saskatchewan Party under Moe was re-elected to its fourth majority.

Since 2020, observers have noted a further rightward shift by the Saskatchewan Party, owing at least in part to the emergence of new right-wing provincial parties including the separatist Buffalo Party and the Saskatchewan United Party. The latter was founded and first led by former Saskatchewan Party MLA Nadine Wilson, who resigned from the caucus after it was revealed that she lied about her COVID vaccination status. Both parties have managed second-place finishes in rural ridings, and Moe has openly addressed their supporters. The Saskatchewan Party's response is evident in new education policies unveiled just weeks before the new school year in the summer of 2023. The policies restrict sexual health education, including a prohibition on the involvement of third parties like sexual health centres, and require parental consent for students under 16 wishing to have their chosen names and pronouns affirmed at school. When an injunction was granted against the policy over concerns about harm to students, the government legislated the policy in the Parents' Bill of Rights and invoked the notwithstanding clause to protect the law against Charter challenges. Moreover, Moe has publicly entertained conspiracy theories, including stating at a town hall meeting that he would "do some more work looking into" concerns about chemtrails.

In 2024, Speaker Randy Weekes alleged in the Legislature that the Saskatchewan Party caucus was rife with bullying behaviour, and that he had been met with intimidation tactics in his role as Speaker, particularly by then-House Leader Jeremy Harrison. Weekes ultimately resigned his party membership. In the lead-up to the 2024 Saskatchewan general election, a number of other former party members disavowed the direction of the party and endorsed the NDP.

In the 2024 provincial election, the Saskatchewan Party saw its support drop; however, the party won enough seats to form its fifth consecutive majority government. That majority was reduced from seventeen seats to three by a resurgent NDP, which achieved its best electoral performance since 2003 in taking all of Regina's districts and all but one in Saskatoon.

== Ideology ==
Since its inception, the Saskatchewan Party has been variously described as centre-right, right-wing, populist, neoliberal, and Christian conservative; however, there have been some consistent trends over time, with more moderate labels generally giving way to more conservative ones since the party first formed government. The party has also been described as right-wing populist.

Although there was some tendency to describe the party at its inception as centre-right, owing to the party's foundation that joined former Conservative and Liberal Party members, the earliest days of the party were dominated by discussions of its conservatism. The party had to work hard to moderate its image to achieve greater electoral success. It was successful, and in its early years in power it was commonly labelled centre-right. Moreover, there appeared to be a consensus that during his time as leader, Wall and the Saskatchewan Party became virtually synonymous, and that the party's popularity was bolstered by Wall's populist appeal. Wall was known to claim that people in Saskatchewan are "not really interested in ideology." Early on, the party also pursued policies that were not strictly traditionally conservative, including an opposition to a foreign takeover of Saskatoon-based PotashCorp, earning the government a reputation as "pragmatic". The most significant exception to this was the party's labour policy, which has been seen as traditionally conservative since the party first gained power.

Over time, there has been a notable decrease in Liberal influence in the party, which may be partly attributable to the continued presence of the provincial Liberal Party. (Note: In 2023, the Liberal Party was renamed the Saskatchewan Progress Party.) However, it has been noted that during their first decade in government, most party members with Liberal backgrounds retired or left the party. This was evident during the party's 2018 leadership race, when social conservative issues like restricting abortion access became a topic of discussion for the first time since the party's earliest days. There has been an increasing tendency to describe the Saskatchewan Party as right-wing and neoliberal, especially since the party began pursuing austerity policies when faced with economic challenges in the mid-2010s. Moreover, observers have noted that the party in recent years appears to be increasingly influenced by trends found in American conservative and far-right movements, including through its tendency to promote "culture wars", or issues with stark ideological contrasts.

The Saskatchewan Party has professed to be a free-market party. Political scientist Charles Smith has argued that this position has been somewhat tempered by strong Saskatchewan traditions of supporting crown corporations and unionization. As a consequence, the Saskatchewan Party has pursued a process of "active incrementalism," whereby the party works to weaken popular support for particular institutions in order to privatize them—in whole or in part—or wind them down over time. The party has also increasingly pursued public-private partnerships for new developments. By pursuing such a strategy, the party has been successful in realizing a privatization agenda since its early days in power.

== Policies and positions ==
=== Economy ===
Since coming to power in 2007, the Saskatchewan Party has maintained a commitment to the lowest corporate tax rates in the country. The province has remained among the provinces with the lowest minimum wage. In 2022, the government sent $500 tax credit cheques to residents.

The party has pursued the privatization and closure of a wide range of public assets. In 2017, the party passed a bill that would allow the government to privatize up to 49% of a crown corporation without public consultation; however, the law was repealed in 2018 in the face of public backlash. The party has also focused on bolstering direct trade relationships with other countries, establishing trade offices and conducting trade missions around the globe.

The party has tended to run deficits, and provincial debt is forecast to exceed $30 billion in 2024.

=== Education ===
The Saskatchewan Party has favoured decentralization of administration in the education system. In 2012, the party introduced public funding for qualified independent schools. The Saskatchewan Teachers' Federation has accused the Saskatchewan Party of pursuing a privatization agenda by 'siphoning' funds from the public system into the private sector.

In 2023, the party introduced a Parents' Bill of Rights, which regulated the use of pronouns and gendered names in schools by requiring staff to inform parents if the student wants to go by a different name or gender identity, requiring parental consent for children under the age of 16 who wished to change their preferred pronouns while at school and placed restrictions on sexual health education in schools. During the 2024 provincial election, Moe announced his intent to immediately enact rules requiring school students to use the changing rooms that correspond to their biological sex. After winning the election, party leader Moe stated that he "misspoke" and that the bathroom bill was not in fact a top priority, and would be subject to consultations with school boards.

=== Environment ===
The Saskatchewan Party has favoured investment in technology to achieve greenhouse gas emissions reductions, including carbon capture and small modular nuclear reactors. Under the party, the province has the highest GHG emissions per capita in the nation. The party has opposed federal environmental regulation, including the federal carbon tax. The province released its own climate change strategy in 2017, which has been criticized by experts for its weak targets and lack of enforcement mechanisms. While the province touts high standards of environmental regulation, much of this regime is self-monitored on the part of industry. A lack of oversight was blamed for the 2016 Husky pipeline spill of over 200,000 litres of oil into the North Saskatchewan River.

=== Federal relations ===
The Saskatchewan Party has advocated for greater autonomy for the province, citing areas like policing, immigration, and taxation as priorities. Its 2022 Saskatchewan First Act re-asserted the province's constitutional rights to natural resources. The province has challenged federal efforts at regulating the environment and resource development, including the carbon tax and environmental assessments.

=== Healthcare ===
The Saskatchewan Party introduced the Lean program to the healthcare system in a bid to cut costs. The party has persistently expanded the use of private clinics and privatized services within the public system. In 2023, the government paid a private Calgary clinic $10 million to perform surgeries for Saskatchewan residents.

=== Immigration ===
The Saskatchewan Party has increased immigration to the province, and has advocated for greater provincial control over the immigration process.

== Federal affiliation ==
The Saskatchewan Party is not officially affiliated with any federal political party. However, the party has long been attached with federal conservatives, who since the turn of the twenty-first century have largely dominated federal politics in Saskatchewan. The populist Reform Party of Canada was often cited as an inspiration for the formulation of the Saskatchewan Party, and many Reform members were involved in its establishment. The Saskatchewan Party's first leader, Elwin Hermanson, had been a Reform MP. In 2000, Reform rebranded as the Canadian Alliance, and in 2003 the Alliance merged with the Progressive Conservatives to form the new Conservative Party of Canada, which since its inception has had significant overlap with the Saskatchewan Party.

A number of Conservative MPs have been involved with the Saskatchewan Party. Examples include Carol Skelton, who served on Elwin Hermanson's constituency executive; Tom Lukiwski, who served as a General Manager of the Saskatchewan Party; Garry Breitkreuz, who supported the formation of the party; and Lynne Yelich, who worked for Allan Kerpan while Kerpan served as MP and received funding from him in the 2006 federal election. Warren Steinley and Corey Tochor are Conservative MPs who previously served as Saskatchewan Party MLAs. Brad Wall was considered a contender for leadership of the federal Conservatives ahead of leadership elections in 2017 and 2019, but both times he declined to enter the race. Wall did, however, play a behind-the-scenes role in founding an American-style political action committee called the Buffalo Project in 2018. The project was designed to lobby and fund political candidates with the aim of electing conservatives provincially and federally.

As recently as the 2023 Saskatchewan Party convention, the Saskatchewan and Conservative parties endorsed each other. At that convention, Conservative leader Pierre Poilievre praised the Saskatchewan Party for its legal battles against the federal government over resource and environmental policies, while Moe endorsed Poilievre and the Conservatives ahead of the next federal election.

== Election results ==
=== Legislative Assembly ===
Election	Leader	Votes	%	Seats	+/–	Position	Status
1999	Elwin Hermanson	160,603	39.6	25 / 58	▲25	▲2nd	Opposition
2003	Elwin Hermanson	168,144	39.4	28 / 58	▲3	2nd	Opposition
2007	Brad Wall	230,671	50.9	38 / 58	▲10	▲1st	Majority
2011	Brad Wall	258,598	64.3	49 / 58	▲11	1st	Majority
2016	Brad Wall	270,776	62.6	51 / 61	▲2	1st	Majority
2020	Scott Moe	269,996	60.7	48 / 61	▼3	1st	Majority
2024	Scott Moe	244,037	52.3	34 / 61	▼14	1st	Majority

== Party leaders ==
† denotes acting or interim leader

#	Party Leader	Highest Position	Tenure	Notes
†	Ken Krawetz	Leader of the Opposition	1997–1998	Interim leader before the party's first leadership election in 1998.
1	Elwin Hermanson	Leader of the Opposition	1998–2004	First elected leader; joined the Legislature in 1999 election.
†	Lyle Stewart	Leader of the Opposition	2004	
2	Brad Wall	Premier	2004–2018	Acclaimed leader; first Saskatchewan Party Premier.
3	Scott Moe	Premier	2018–present	

== Current Saskatchewan Party MLAs ==
Member	District	Elected	Notes
Chris Beaudry	Kelvington-Wadena	2024	
Terri Bromm	Carrot River Valley	2024	
Lori Carr	Estevan-Big Muddy	2016	
David Chan	Yorkton	2024	
Ken Cheveldayoff	Saskatoon Willowgrove	2003	Unsuccessful candidate in the 2018 Saskatchewan Party leadership election.
Jeremy Cockrill	The Battlefords	2020	
Brad Crassweller	White City-Qu'appelle	2024	
Kim Gartner	Kindersley-Biggar	2024	
Todd Goudy	Melfort	2018	
Daryl Harrison	Cannington	2020	
Jeremy Harrison	Meadow Lake	2007	
Racquel Hilbert	Humboldt-Watrous	2024	
Everett Hindley	Swift Current	2018	
Terry Jenson	Warman	2020	
Warren Kaeding	Melville-Saltcoats	2016	
Kevin Kasun	Prince Albert Carlton	2024	
Travis Keisig	Last Mountain-Touchwood	2020	
Barret Kropf	Dakota-Arm River	2024	
Dave Marit	Wood River	2016	
Jamie Martens	Martensville-Blairmore	2024	
Blaine McLeod	Lumsden-Morse	2023	
Tim McLeod	Moose Jaw North	2020	
Scott Moe	Rosthern-Shellbrook	2011	Party leader and Premier, 2018–present.
Megan Patterson	Moose Jaw Wakamow	2024	
Jim Reiter	Rosetown-Elrose	2007	
Alana Ross	Prince Albert Northcote	2020	
Darlene Rowden	Batoche	2024	
Eric Schmalz	Saskatchewan Rivers	2024	
Doug Steele	Cypress Hills	2016	
James Thorsteinson	Cut Knife-Turtleford	2024	Party president, 2014–2023.
Kevin Weedmark	Moosomin-Montmartre	2024	
Michael Weger	Weyburn-Bengough	2024	
Sean Wilson	Canora-Pelly	2024	
Colleen Young	Lloydminster	2014	

== See also ==
- Politics of Saskatchewan
- Saskatchewan Party leadership elections
