= Saskatoon Willowgrove =

Provincial electoral district in Saskatchewan, Canada

Saskatchewan electoral district

Provincial electoral district
- Legislature: Legislative Assembly of Saskatchewan
MLA
Ken Cheveldayoff
Saskatchewan
- District created: 2013
- First contested: 2016
- Last contested: 2024
- Communities: Saskatoon

Saskatoon Willowgrove is a provincial electoral district for the Legislative Assembly of Saskatchewan, Canada. It succeeded the former Saskatoon Silver Springs riding and was first contested in the 2016 election.

== Members of the Legislative Assembly ==
Legislature	Years	Member	Party
District created from Saskatoon Silver Springs
28th	2016–2020	Ken Cheveldayoff	Saskatchewan Party
29th	2020–2024	Ken Cheveldayoff	Saskatchewan Party
30th	2024–present	Ken Cheveldayoff	Saskatchewan Party

== Election results ==
2024 Saskatchewan general election
Party	Candidate	Votes	%	±%
Saskatchewan	Ken Cheveldayoff	4,895	49.02	-19.38
New Democratic	Alana Wakula	4,759	47.66	+17.66
Saskatchewan United	William Hughes	251	2.51	–
Green	Tawe Morin	80	0.80	-0.80
Total valid votes		9,985	98.88	
Total rejected ballots		113	1.12	
Turnout		10,098	64.58	
Eligible voters		15,637		
Saskatchewan hold		Swing		
Source: Elections Saskatchewan

2020 provincial election redistributed results
Party	%
Saskatchewan	68.4
New Democratic	30.0
Green	1.6

2020 Saskatchewan general election
Party	Candidate	Votes	%	±%
Saskatchewan	Ken Cheveldayoff	7,509	66.38	-5.72
New Democratic	Kaitlyn Harvey	3,600	31.82	+7.84
Green	David Greenfield	203	1.80	+0.40
Total valid votes		11,312	99.05	
Total rejected ballots		108	0.95	–
Turnout		11,420	–	–
Eligible voters		–		
Saskatchewan hold		Swing		–
Source: Elections Saskatchewan

2016 Saskatchewan general election
Party	Candidate	Votes	%	±%
Saskatchewan	Ken Cheveldayoff	6,603	72.10	–
New Democratic	Tajinder Grewal	2,196	23.98	–
Liberal	Jason Gorin	229	2.50	–
Green	Sarah Risk	129	1.40	–
Total valid votes		9,157	100.0	
Eligible voters		–		
Source: Elections Saskatchewan

== See also ==
- List of Saskatchewan provincial electoral districts
- List of Saskatchewan general elections
- Canadian provincial electoral districts
