= Global Transportation Hub Authority =

Inland port near Regina, Saskatchewan, Canada

- Company type: Crown corporation
- Industry: Transportation
- Founded: June 29, 2009
- Headquarters: Regina, Saskatchewan, Canada
- Products: Inter-modal transportation facilities
- Website: http://www.thegth.com/

Global Transportation Hub Authority located in Regina, Saskatchewan is one of Canada's several inland ports, along with Centre Port in Manitoba and Port Alberta in Edmonton, Alberta. As a Crown corporation of the Government of Saskatchewan, the authority is responsible for marketing, financing, planning, and attracting investment for an inter-modal transfer and logistics facility in Regina.

The port consists of a 1,800-acre logistics park a few kilometres from the city of Regina. It is situated on the Canadian Pacific Railway mainline and near the Trans-Canada Highway and Highway 11.

As an autonomous government entity, the GTH operates much like a municipality. It is responsible for its own land-use planning and development regulations, governance structure, sub-division approvals, permitting, and enforcement services.

The Global Transportation Hub is also one of nine Foreign Trade Zone points in the country, and the only FTZ in Saskatchewan.

As of July 2024 the hub has 18 business, with 1010.2 acres of land sold since its inception while 497 acres remain for sale. The Hub Authority has been criticized for showing maps where all of the land is full.

Notable tenants at the hub include:

- Canadian Pacific Railway inter-modal facility capable of 250,000 TEU lifts annually
- Loblaw Western Canada Distribution Centre - consisting of one-million square foot distribution facility handling 1,400 trucks per week
- Consolidated Fastfrate (CFF) intermodal and distribution facility
- Cargill (Canola crushing Facility)
- 4Tracks
- Amazon Canada Fulfillment services (Purchased 14.35 acres in 2022)

The Global Transportation Hub has become the subject of controversy over its involvement in a land purchase that disproportionately benefited businessmen with personal ties to Sask Party MLA Bill Boyd.
