= Premier of Saskatchewan =

Head of government of Saskatchewan

- Premier ministre de la Saskatchewan
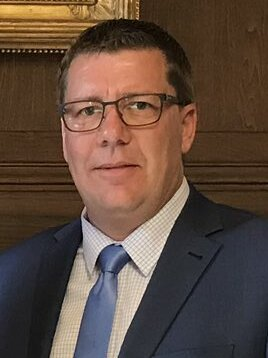
- Incumbent; Scott Moe since February 2, 2018
- Office of the Premier
- Style: The Honourable (formal); Premier (informal)
- Status: Head of Government
- Member of: Legislative Assembly; Executive Council
- Reports to: Legislative Assembly; Lieutenant Governor
- Seat: Legislative Building, Regina
- Appointer: Lieutenant Governor of Saskatchewan; with the confidence of the Saskatchewan Legislature
- Term length: At His Majesty's pleasure; contingent on the premier's ability to command confidence in the legislative assembly
- Formation: September 12, 1905
- First holder: Thomas Walter Scott
- Deputy: Deputy Premier of Saskatchewan
- Salary: $173,885: Member's indemnity of $100,668 plus additional allowance of $73,217
- Website: Office of the Premier

The premier of Saskatchewan is the first minister and head of government for the Canadian province of Saskatchewan. The current premier of Saskatchewan is Scott Moe, who was sworn in as premier on February 2, 2018, after winning the 2018 Saskatchewan Party leadership election. The first premier of Saskatchewan was Liberal Thomas Walter Scott, who served from 1905 to 1916. Since Saskatchewan was created as a province in 1905, 15 individuals have served as premier.

== Legal status ==
Although the premier is the day-to-day leader of the provincial government, they receive the authority to govern from the Crown, represented in Saskatchewan by the lieutenant governor. Formally, the executive branch of government in Saskatchewan is said to be vested in the lieutenant governor acting by and with the advice of the premier. The executive branch of the Saskatchewan government consists of the premier, the lieutenant governor, the Cabinet and the Public Service.

The political party that wins the largest number of seats in a general election is usually invited by the lieutenant governor to form the government. The governing party's leader becomes the head of the provincial government and is known as the premier. The position of premier is not described in Canadian constitutional statutes. Instead, the premier's power and authority largely depend on their relationship with other members of the Legislative Assembly, political party, and the public.

== Formal responsibilities ==
The premier's responsibilities are varied. They serve as president of the Executive Council and head of the provincial Cabinet. The Executive Council is the formal name of the Cabinet when it is acting in its legal capacity, as well as the head of the provincial government. The premier is a leader concerning the development and implementation of government policies, as well as communicating and coordinating priorities within the province as well as within the country. In addition to the political duties with the province of Saskatchewan, the premier is also the leader of one of the province's main political parties and represents their constituency in the Legislative Assembly.

== See also ==
- Prime Minister of Canada
- Premier (Canada)
- List of premiers of Saskatchewan
- List of premiers of Saskatchewan by time in office
