= Ed Tchorzewski =

Canadian politician

President of the New Democratic Party of Canada
- In office 1997–1999
- Preceded by: Iain Angus
- Succeeded by: Dave MacKinnon

Member of the Legislative Assembly of Saskatchewan for Humboldt
- In office 1971–1982
- Preceded by: Mathieu Breker (Liberal)
- Succeeded by: Louis Domotor (PC)

Member of the Legislative Assembly of Saskatchewan for Regina Northeast
- In office 1985–1991
- Preceded by: Russell Sutor (PC)
- Succeeded by: riding abolished

Member of the Legislative Assembly of Saskatchewan for Regina Dewdney
- In office 1991–1999
- Preceded by: new riding
- Succeeded by: Kevin Yates (NDP)

Personal details
- Born: April 22, 1943 Alvena, Saskatchewan
- Died: June 6, 2008 (aged 65) Regina, Saskatchewan
- Party: Saskatchewan New Democratic Party/New Democratic Party of Canada

Edwin Laurence Tchorzewski (April 22, 1943 – June 6, 2008) was a Canadian politician, former Saskatchewan finance minister and member of the Legislative Assembly for 25 years.

As a member of the Saskatchewan New Democratic Party, he was MLA from the Humboldt electoral district from 1971 to 1982. He later represented Regina Northeast from 1985 to 1991, and Regina Dewdney from 1991 to 1999.

Tchorzewski was born in Alvena, Saskatchewan and was educated in Hudson Bay and at the University of Saskatchewan. He taught school in Humboldt. In 1966, he married Shirley Stasiuk. Tchorzewski served in the provincial cabinet as Minister of Finance, as Provincial Secretary, as Minister of Education and as Minister of Municipal Government. In 1997, he became president of the federal NDP. He resigned his seat in the Saskatchewan assembly in 1999 to become chief of staff for Alexa McDonough. Tchorzewski became special adviser to Lorne Calvert in 2002. In 2006, he became secretary for the provincial NDP.

Tchorzewski died in Regina at the age of 65.
