= Frank Stephen Krenn =

Canadian politician

Frank Stephen Krenn (July 30, 1911 – after 1965) was a civil servant, journalist and political figure in Saskatchewan. He represented Watrous from 1938 to 1944 in the Legislative Assembly of Saskatchewan as a Liberal.

He was born in Wilmont, Saskatchewan, the son of Joseph Krenn and Mary Winkels, both of German descent, and was educated at St. Peter's College. His parents had both died when he was seven. In 1937, Krenn married Sybilus Smith. He lived in Bruno, Saskatchewan. Krenn resigned from a civil service job to seek the Liberal candidacy for Watrous in 1938. He ran unsuccessfully for a seat in the Canadian House of Commons in a 1943 by-election held in the Humboldt riding. Krenn was defeated by James Andrew Darling when he ran for reelection to the Saskatchewan assembly in 1944. He later ran as an independent in the British Columbia riding of Fraser Valley in the 1965 Canadian Election, receiving 272 votes.
