= Kevin Yates =

Kevin Yates may refer to:

- Kevin Yates (rugby union)
- Kevin Yates (politician)
- Kevin Yates (artist)
