= Joseph William Burton =

Canadian politician (1892–1960)

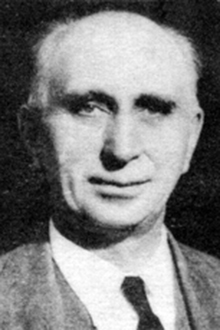

Saskatchewan Provincial Secretary
- In office October 24, 1952 – July 27, 1956
- Premier: Tommy Douglas
- Preceded by: Charles Cromwell Williams
- Succeeded by: Russell Brown

Member of the Legislative Assembly of Saskatchewan for Humboldt
- In office June 11, 1952 – June 20, 1956
- Preceded by: Arnold Loehr
- Succeeded by: Mary Batten
- In office August 4, 1938 – 1943
- Preceded by: James Chisholm King
- Succeeded by: Ben Putnam

Canadian Member of Parliament for Humboldt
- In office August 9, 1943 – June 26, 1949
- Preceded by: Harry Raymond Fleming
- Succeeded by: Joseph Ingolph Hetland

Personal details
- Born: October 12, 1892 Pittsburg, Kansas, US
- Died: August 1, 1960 (aged 67)
- Party: Co-operative Commonwealth Federation
- Children: John Burton
- Occupation: Farmer

Joseph William Burton (1892–1960) was a Canadian politician and farmer.

Burton was born on October 12, 1892, in Pittsburg, Kansas. Burton was a grand knight of the Knights of Columbus and a staunch Roman Catholic and socialist who argued during political meetings in Humboldt, Saskatchewan, that the Co-operative Commonwealth Federation was more in line with the demands for social justice made in papal encyclicals than other parties.

He was elected to the Saskatchewan Legislative Assembly in a 1938 provincial by-election becoming the only Catholic MLA in the province. In an August 9, 1943 federal by-election, he was elected to the House of Commons of Canada representing Humboldt for the CCF. He was re-elected in the 1945 general election but defeated in 1949.

During a 1947 debate in the House, Burton explained the compatibility of his religious and political views:

The Church to which I belong, condemns in no uncertain terms the type of socialism that interferes with a person's religious beliefs, which is opposed to the ownership of private property. None of these are policies of the CCF. As the years have gone by, we have seen many kinds of socialism throughout the world and for want of a better term we have applied to the philosophy and principles of the CCF the expression "socialist" because the fundamental principles of our policy are to build laws around the protection of society rather than the protection of capital.

After losing his federal seat, Burton returned to provincial politics as a Saskatchewan CCF MLA in the 1952 provincial election and served as Provincial Secretary in Tommy Douglas' cabinet from 1952 until the 1956 provincial election when he was defeated by Mary Batten of the Saskatchewan Liberal Party. He died on August 1, 1960.
