= Yens Pedersen =

Canadian politician and lawyer

Member of the Saskatchewan Legislative Assembly for Regina Northeast
- In office September 12, 2018 – September 29, 2020
- Preceded by: Kevin Doherty
- Succeeded by: Gary Grewal

Personal details
- Party: New Democratic Party
- Occupation: Lawyer

Yens Pedersen is a Canadian politician and lawyer, who served in the Legislative Assembly of Saskatchewan from 2018 to 2020 representing the constituency of Regina Northeast. He is a former candidate in the Saskatchewan New Democratic Party leadership race. Before entering the leadership race, he served as the president of the Saskatchewan New Democratic Party.

== Early life and career ==
Pedersen was raised on a family farm near Cut Knife, Saskatchewan. He attended and earned his law degree from Osgoode Hall Law School and has been a Regina lawyer for over 20 years, specializing in work with individual families and small to mid-size businesses. He has been the chair of the Taxation section of the Canadian Bar Association in Regina and also the president of the Regina Business Association. He also served on the board of directors for Saskatchewan Express (musical theatre group) and for The Royal Lifesaving Society (Saskatchewan Branch).

== Political career ==
Pedersen was the NDP candidate in the constituency of Regina South in the 2007 and 2011 provincial elections. In both elections, he placed second to the Bill Hutchinson of the Saskatchewan Party.

On January 22, 2009, Pedersen announced his bid to succeed Lorne Calvert as the leader of the Saskatchewan NDP at the party's June 2009 leadership convention. He finished third at the convention. After Deb Higgins was eliminated on the first ballot, Pedersen threw his support behind Ryan Meili, the second place finisher on the first ballot.

On May 2, 2018, Pedersen won the NDP nomination for an upcoming provincial by-election in Regina Northeast. He won the by-election with 54% of the vote on September 12, 2018.
