= Regina Gardiner Park =

Provincial electoral district in Saskatchewan, Canada

Saskatchewan electoral district

Defunct provincial electoral district
- Legislature: Legislative Assembly of Saskatchewan
- District created: 2013
- First contested: 2016
- Last contested: 2020
- Communities: Regina

Regina Gardiner Park is a provincial electoral district for the Legislative Assembly of Saskatchewan, Canada. It was first contested in the 2016 election. The constituency essentially supersedes the electoral district of Regina Dewdney. It was dissolved into Regina University, Regina Northeast, Regina Wascana Plains and Regina Douglas Park before the 30th Saskatchewan general election.

== Members of the Legislative Assembly ==
Legislature	Years	Member	Party
District created from Regina Dewdney
28th	2016–2020	Gene Makowsky	Saskatchewan Party
29th	2020–2024	Gene Makowsky	Saskatchewan Party

== Election results ==
2020 Saskatchewan general election
Party	Candidate	Votes	%	±%
Saskatchewan	Gene Makowsky	4,342	60.78	+1.21
New Democratic	Faycal Haggui	2,542	35.58	+1.19
Green	Helmi Scott Uguh	142	1.99	+0.06
Progressive Conservative	David Teece	118	1.65	–
Total valid votes		7,144	99.15	
Total rejected ballots		61	0.85	–
Turnout		7,205	–	–
Eligible voters		–		
Saskatchewan hold		Swing		–
Source: Elections Saskatchewan

2016 Saskatchewan general election
Party	Candidate	Votes	%	±%
Saskatchewan	Gene Makowsky	4,259	59.57	–
New Democratic	Faycal Haggui	2,459	34.39	–
Liberal	Jesse Albanez	294	4.11	–
Green	Liam Becker Lau	138	1.93	–
Total valid votes		7,150	100.0	
Eligible voters		–		
Source: Elections Saskatchewan

== See also ==
- List of Saskatchewan provincial electoral districts
- List of Saskatchewan general elections
- Canadian provincial electoral districts
