= Donna Harpauer =

Canadian politician

The Honourable Donna Harpauer ECS

Member of the Saskatchewan Legislative Assembly for Humboldt-Watrous Humboldt (2003–2016)
- In office November 5, 2003 – October 1, 2024
- Preceded by: Arlene Julé
- Succeeded by: Racquel Hilbert

Deputy Premier of Saskatchewan
- In office November 9, 2020 – November 7, 2024
- Premier: Scott Moe
- Preceded by: Gordon Wyant
- Succeeded by: Jim Reiter

Member of the Saskatchewan Legislative Assembly for Watrous
- In office September 16, 1999 – November 5, 2003
- Preceded by: Eric Upshall
- Succeeded by: Riding Abolished

Personal details
- Born: Guernsey, Saskatchewan
- Party: Saskatchewan Party
- Children: 3

Donna Harpauer is a Canadian politician. She was a member of the Legislative Assembly of Saskatchewan from 1999 to 2024, representing the constituencies of Watrous, Humboldt and Humboldt-Watrous as a member of the Saskatchewan Party. Harpauer served in the Executive Council of Saskatchewan from 2007 to 2024 in several different portfolios, including as Minister of Finance from 2017 to 2024 and concurrently as Deputy Premier from 2020 to 2024. Harpauer is the longest-served female cabinet minister in Canadian history.

== Early life and career ==
Harpauer was raised on a farm near Guernsey, Saskatchewan. She received a medical laboratory technologist certificate from Saskatchewan Polytechnic in Saskatoon and worked for a time in the field of microbiology.

== Political career ==
Harpauer was first elected to the Legislative Assembly in the 1999 election, defeating New Democratic Party incumbent Eric Upshall in the riding of Watrous. That riding was dissolved ahead of the 2003 election, and Harpauer was re-elected in the constituency of Humboldt. She was re-elected again in 2007, 2011, 2016, and 2020. Harpauer served in cabinet every term after the Saskatchewan Party first formed government in the 2007 election, making her one of the longest-serving cabinet ministers in Canada. In January 2024, Harpauer became the longest serving female cabinet minister in Canadian history.

Harpauer's time in cabinet includes two stints as the Minister of Social Services. While in that role in 2016, Harpauer oversaw cuts to social assistance affecting approximately 2,700 people, which Harpauer said were meant to crack down on 'stacking' or 'double-dipping' on welfare benefits. When Harpauer suggested that the cutbacks were based on a recommendation from a poverty reduction working group, members of that group responded that this was false, and that they did not endorse the social assistance reforms. The cuts were criticized for reducing already meager benefits. Harpauer later cited the 2009 introduction of new disability benefits as a career highlight.

In 2017, Harpauer was named Minister of Finance. Harpauer was in charge of the 2017 budget, which drew criticism for its austerity, including cuts to education funding, grants for municipalities, library funding—the lone cut that was eventually reversed—and the shuttering of the Saskatchewan Transportation Company. The unpopularity of the 2017 budget contributed to Brad Wall's decision to retire in 2018.

During the 2018 leadership election to replace Wall, Harpauer chaired Scott Moe's successful leadership campaign. In 2020, Moe named Harpauer the first female deputy premier in the province in over three decades.

The Saskatchewan Party ran its 2020 election campaign on a promise to balance the provincial budget by 2024. Months after the election, in the spring of 2021, Harpauer admitted that it would be "very, very difficult to meet that goal", and that "in all good likelihood, we'll have to change that goalpost."

In February 2024, it was announced that Harpauer would not be seeking re-election in the 2024 provincial election. Harpauer stated that after 25 years a new perspective would be welcome, and cited a desire to spend more time with family. When Harpauer introduced her final budget in the spring of 2024, she described the economic challenge facing Saskatchewan as having "growth without the benefits of growth".

== Controversies ==
In 2017, it was reported that when serving as Minister of Social Services in 2008, Harpauer used private email for government-related matters. In one email she told a former campaign staffer, "I will hire you by contract if need be to get around the rules defined by the [Public Service Commission]." In another email to the same person, she stated, "The Public Service Commission is getting all crappy about us hiring people without open competition... Blah... Blah... Blah. Lots of fun. I really don't care what they think!!" The former staffer said Harpauer told him to use private email because "we wanted to be free from the freedom of information requests."

In 2018, Harpauer was revealed to have twice had hotel stays for personal trips in Pinehouse—one in 2016 and another in 2018—paid for by the village. Harpauer did not disclose any gifts or benefits for the stays in her personal disclosure statements. Harpauer stated that she was unaware that the village had paid for the accommodations, and that she would repay the village.

In 2022, Harpauer was criticized for an expense of nearly $8,000 for a return charter flight between Regina and North Battleford. Harpauer defended the trip, which was made to speak at a local chamber of commerce luncheon, stating that she was "exhausted" at the time.

In 2024, when Speaker Randy Weekes unveiled allegations of harassment and bullying within the Saskatchewan Party caucus, he read into the record a text message from Harpauer accusing him of lying and favouring the Opposition, part of what Weekes described as a campaign by the governing party to influence his decisions.

== Electoral results ==
2020 Saskatchewan general election: Humboldt-Watrous
Party	Candidate	Votes	%
Saskatchewan	Donna Harpauer	5,713	72.81
New Democratic	Wendy Sekulich	1,180	15.04
Buffalo	Constance Maffenbeier	529	6.74
Progressive Conservative	Rose Buscholl	243	3.10
Green	Jim Ternier	181	2.31
Total		7,846	100.0
Source: Elections Saskatchewan

2016 Saskatchewan general election: Humboldt-Watrous
Party	Candidate	Votes	%
Saskatchewan	Donna Harpauer	5,818	74.54
New Democratic	Adam Duke	1,588	20.34
Liberal	Robert Tutka	212	2.71
Green	Lori Harper	187	2.39
Total		7,805	100.0
Source: Saskatchewan Archives - Election Results by Electoral Division; Elections Saskatchewan

2011 Saskatchewan general election: Humboldt
Party	Candidate	Votes	%
Saskatchewan	Donna Harpauer	5,677	73.02
New Democratic	Gord Bedient	1,807	23.24
Green	Lynn Oliphant	291	3.74
Total		7,775	100.0
Source: Saskatchewan Archives - Election Results by Electoral Division

2007 Saskatchewan general election: Humboldt
Party	Candidate	Votes	%
Saskatchewan	Donna Harpauer	5,049	57.57
New Democratic	Brenda Curtis	2,456	28.01
Liberal	Brent Loehr	1,048	11.95
Green	Anita Rocamora	217	2.47
Total		8,770	100.0
Source: Saskatchewan Archives - Election Results by Electoral Division

2003 Saskatchewan general election: Humboldt
Party	Candidate	Votes	%
Saskatchewan	Donna Harpauer	3,464	41.99
New Democratic	Bryan Barnes	3,291	39.89
Liberal	Les C. Alm	1,495	18.12
Western Independence	~~Del Anderson~~	~~138~~^{1}	–
Total		8,250	100.0
^{1} "Voided - candidacy withdrawn"
Source: Saskatchewan Archives - Election Results by Electoral Division

1999 Saskatchewan general election: Watrous
Party	Candidate	Votes	%
Saskatchewan	Donna Harpauer	3,572	45.00
New Democratic	Eric Upshall	2,928	36.89
Liberal	Ray Hall	1,437	18.11
Total		7,937	100.0
Source: Saskatchewan Archives - Election Results by Electoral Division

== Cabinet positions ==
Saskatchewan provincial government of Scott Moe
Cabinet post (1)
Predecessor	Office	Successor
cont'd from Wall Ministry	Minister of Finance; February 2, 2018 – November 7, 2024	Jim Reiter
Saskatchewan provincial government of Brad Wall
Cabinet posts (8)
Predecessor	Office	Successor
Kevin Doherty	Minister of Finance; August 30, 2017 – February 2, 2018	cont'd into Moe Ministry
Jim Reiter	Minister of Government Relations; August 23, 2016 – August 30, 2017	Larry Doke
Jim Reiter	Minister of First Nations, Métis and Northern Affairs; August 23, 2016 – August 30, 2017	Larry Doke
June Draude	Minister of Social Services; June 5, 2014 – August 23, 2016	Tina Beaudry-Mellor
Tim McMillan	Minister of Crown Investments; May 25, 2012 – June 5, 2014	Don McMorris
Ken Krawetz	Minister of Education; June 29, 2010 – May 25, 2012	Russ Marchuk
June Draude	Provincial Secretary of Saskatchewan; June 29, 2010 – November 30, 2011	Wayne Elhard
Kevin Yates	Minister of Social Services; November 21, 2007 – June 29, 2010	June Draude
