= Eric Upshall =

Canadian politician

Assembly Member for Humboldt
- In office 1986–1995
- Preceded by: Louis Domotor
- Succeeded by: Arlene Julé

Assembly Member for Watrous
- In office 1995–1999
- Preceded by: first member
- Succeeded by: Donna Harpauer

Personal details
- Born: December 24, 1951 (age 74) Yorkton, Saskatchewan
- Party: Saskatchewan New Democratic Party

Eric Malcolm Thomas Upshall (born December 24, 1951) is a Canadian provincial politician, who served as a Saskatchewan New Democratic Party member of the Legislative Assembly of Saskatchewan from 1986 to 1999.

He was first elected to the Legislative Assembly in the 1986 election in the constituency of Humboldt. He served in that district until the 1995 election, when he instead stood for re-election in the new district of Watrous. He was subsequently defeated by Donna Harpauer in the 1999 election.
