= Walter Smishek =

Canadian politician and labour leader

Member of the Legislative Assembly of Saskatchewan for Regina North East
- In office 1967–1982
- Preceded by: new district
- Succeeded by: Russell Sutor

Member of the Legislative Assembly of Saskatchewan for Regina East
- In office 1964–1967
- Preceded by: new district
- Succeeded by: district abolished

Personal details
- Born: Walter Edmund Smishek; 21 July 1925; Sokal, Lwów Voivodeship, Poland
- Died: 22 December 2014 (aged 89); Regina, Saskatchewan, Canada
- Political party: New Democratic Party

Walter Edmund Smishek (21 July 1925 – 22 December 2014) was a Polish-born Canadian trade unionist and former political figure in Saskatchewan. He represented Regina East from 1964 to 1967 as a Co-operative Commonwealth Federation (CCF) member and Regina North East from 1967 to 1982 as a New Democratic Party (NDP) member in the Legislative Assembly of Saskatchewan.

== Early life ==
Smishek was born in 1925 in Sokal, Eastern Galicia, the son of Andrew Joseph Smishek and Mary Homeniuk, and came to Saskatchewan with his parents in 1930, settling on a farm near Hafford.

== Career ==
Smishek worked for a grocery wholesale firm for five years, then became a representative for the Saskatchewan Retail, Wholesale and Department Store Workers' Union. From 1964 to 1971, he was executive secretary for the Saskatchewan Federation of Labour. He also served as a member of the University of Saskatchewan's Academic Senate representing labour. Smishek served in the provincial cabinet as Minister of Health, as Minister of Finance and as Minister of Urban Affairs. He was also a member of Saskatchewan's Treasury Board, serving as its chair from 1975 to 1979. He was defeated by Russell Sutor when he ran for reelection to the provincial assembly in 1982. After leaving politics, Smishek worked for the Canadian federal Department of Indian and Northern Affairs in Regina.

== Personal life ==
As of 2009, he was retired but continued to live in Regina. He died in Regina at the age of 89 on 22 December 2014.
