= Humboldt (provincial electoral district) =

Former provincial electoral district in Saskatchewan, Canada

Coordinates: 52°10′N 105°40′W

Saskatchewan electoral district
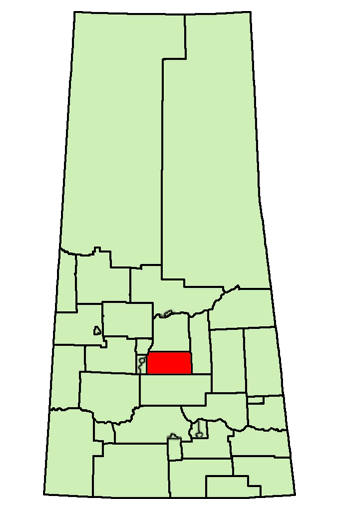

Defunct provincial electoral district
- Legislature: Legislative Assembly of Saskatchewan
- District created: 1905
- First contested: 1905
- Last contested: 2011

Demographics
- Electors: 10,636
- Census division: Division 15
- Census subdivision: Humboldt

Humboldt was a provincial electoral district for the Legislative Assembly of Saskatchewan, Canada. Located in central Saskatchewan, this constituency was one of 25 created for the 1st Saskatchewan general election in 1905.

Incorporated as a city in 2000, Humboldt (pop. 4,998) was the largest centre in the riding. Smaller communities in the district included the towns of Lanigan, Allan, Colonsay, Aberdeen, Clavet, and Bruno; and the villages of Vonda, Viscount, Muenster, and Meacham.

See also the mirrored article, which has information on the former federal electoral district of the same name.

== Members of the Legislative Assembly ==
Parliament	Years	Member	Party
21st	1986–1991	Eric Upshall	New Democrat
22nd	1991–1995	Eric Upshall	New Democrat
23rd	1995–1997	Arlene Julé	Liberal Party
23rd	1997–1999	Arlene Julé	Saskatchewan Party
24th	1999–2003	Arlene Julé	Saskatchewan Party
25th	2003–2007	Donna Harpauer	Saskatchewan Party
26th	2007–2011	Donna Harpauer	Saskatchewan Party
27th	2011–2016	Donna Harpauer	Saskatchewan Party
District dissolved into Humboldt-Watrous, Saskatoon Stonebridge-Dakota, Batoche, Melfort and Arm River

== Election results ==
2011 Saskatchewan general election: Humboldt
Party	Candidate	Votes	%	±%
Saskatchewan	Donna Harpauer	5,677	73.02%	+15.45%
NDP	Gord Bedient	1,807	23.24%	-4.77%
Green	Lynn Oliphant	291	3.74%	+1.27%
Total		7,775	100.00%	

2007 Saskatchewan general election: Humboldt
Party	Candidate	Votes	%	±%
Saskatchewan	Donna Harpauer	5,049	57.57%	+15.64%
NDP	Brenda Curtis	2,456	28.01%	-12.07%
Liberal	Brent Loehr	1,048	11.95%	-6.04%
Green	Anita Rocamora	217	2.47%	-
Total		8,770	100.00%	

2003 Saskatchewan general election: Humboldt
Party	Candidate	Votes	%	±%
Saskatchewan	Donna Harpauer	3,464	41.99%	-2.92%
NDP	Bryan Barnes	3,291	39.89%	+4.89%
Liberal	Les C. Alm	1,495	18.12%	+0.97%
Western Independence	~~Del Anderson~~	~~138~~^{1}	–	–
Total		8,250	100.00%	
^{1} "VOIDED - Candidacy Withdrawn" (see "Humboldt" under Elections Saskatchewan: Twenty-Fifth Provincial General Election.)

1999 Saskatchewan general election: Humboldt
Party	Candidate	Votes	%	±%
Saskatchewan	Arlene Julé	3,821	44.91%	–
NDP	Armand Roy	2,978	35.00%	-6.41%
Liberal	Joanne Perrault	1,459	17.15%	-26.75%
New Green	Ron Schriml	250	2.94%	–
Total		8,508	100.00%	

1995 Saskatchewan general election: Humboldt
Party	Candidate	Votes	%	±%
Liberal	Arlene Julé	3,594	43.90%	+6.37%
NDP	Armand Roy	3,390	41.41%	-20.38%
Prog. Conservative	David Leuschen	1,202	14.69%	+14.01%
Total		8,186	100.00%	

1991 Saskatchewan general election: Humboldt
Party	Candidate	Votes	%	±%
NDP	Eric Upshall	4,422	61.79%	+16.96%
Liberal	Arlene Julé	2,686	37.53%	+24.66%
Prog. Conservative	Dale Blair	49	0.68%	-41.62%
Total		7,157	100.00%	

1986 Saskatchewan general election: Humboldt
Party	Candidate	Votes	%	±%
NDP	Eric Upshall	3,914	44.83%	+0.76%
Prog. Conservative	Louis Domotor	3,693	42.30%	-7.73%
Liberal	Larry Benning	1,124	12.87%	+8.84%
Total		8,731	100.00%	

1982 Saskatchewan general election: Humboldt
Party	Candidate	Votes	%	±%
Prog. Conservative	Louis Domotor	4,480	50.03%	+18.66%
NDP	Edwin Tchorzewski	3,946	44.07%	-10.86%
Liberal	Liguori A. LeBlanc	361	4.03%	-9.67%
Western Canada Concept	Glen Strueby	168	1.87%	–
Total		8,955	100.00%	

1978 Saskatchewan general election: Humboldt
Party	Candidate	Votes	%	±%
NDP	Edwin Tchorzewski	4,272	54.93%	+14.46%
Prog. Conservative	John Bajbula	2,439	31.37%	-0.06%
Liberal	Peter Cline	1,065	13.70%	-14.40%
Total		7,776	100.00%	

1975 Saskatchewan general election: Humboldt
Party	Candidate	Votes	%	±%
NDP	Edwin Tchorzewski	3,006	40.47%	-11.85%
Prog. Conservative	Ray Perpick	2,334	31.43%	-
Liberal	Peter Cline	2,087	28.10%	-19.58%
Total		7,427	100.00%	

1971 Saskatchewan general election: Humboldt
Party	Candidate	Votes	%	±%
NDP	Edwin Tchorzewski	3,366	52.32%	+12.82%
Liberal	Mathieu Breker	3,067	47.68%	-2.95%
Total		6,433	100.00%	

1967 Saskatchewan general election: Humboldt
Party	Candidate	Votes	%	±%
Liberal	Mathieu Breker	3,693	50.63%	+0.91%
NDP	Palma Little	2,881	39.50%	+3.85%
Prog. Conservative	Frank J. Martin	720	9.87%	-4.76%
Total		7,294	100.00%	

1964 Saskatchewan general election: Humboldt
Party	Candidate	Votes	%	±%
Liberal	Mathieu Breker	4,226	49.72%	+1.70%
CCF	Sylvester E. Wiegers	3,030	35.65%	+2.43%
Prog. Conservative	Frank J. Martin	1,244	14.63%	+9.44%
Total		8,500	100.00%	

1960 Saskatchewan general election: Humboldt
Party	Candidate	Votes	%	±%
Liberal	Mary Batten	3,939	48.02%	+9.70%
CCF	George Thomas	2,725	33.22%	-3.32%
Social Credit	Conrad J. Lang	1,113	13.57%	-11.77%
Prog. Conservative	George B. Bailey	426	5.19%	-
Total		8,203	100.00%	

1956 Saskatchewan general election: Humboldt
Party	Candidate	Votes	%	±%
Liberal	Mary Batten	3,223	38.32%	+6.85%
CCF	Joseph William Burton	3,056	36.34%	-8.42%
Social Credit	Joseph Thauberger	2,131	25.34%	+1.57%
Total		8,410	100.00%	

1952 Saskatchewan general election: Humboldt
Party	Candidate	Votes	%	±%
CCF	Joseph William Burton	3,763	44.76%	+10.96%
Liberal	Arnold Loehr	2,646	31.47%	-2.74%
Social Credit	Joseph Thauberger	1,998	23.77%	-8.22%
Total		8,407	100.00%	

1948 Saskatchewan general election: Humboldt
Party	Candidate	Votes	%	±%
Liberal	Arnold Loehr	2,689	34.21%	-6.18%
CCF	Ben Putnam	2,657	33.80%	-20.40%
Social Credit	Joseph Thauberger	2,515	31.99%	-
Total		7,861	100.00%	

1944 Saskatchewan general election: Humboldt
Party	Candidate	Votes	%	±%
CCF	Ben Putnam	3,587	54.20%	+3.30%
Liberal	Arnold Loehr	2,673	40.39%	-8.71%
Prog. Conservative	Stephen D. Weese	358	5.41%	-
Total		6,618	100.00%	

August 4, 1938 By-Election: Humboldt
Party	Candidate	Votes	%	±%
CCF	Joseph William Burton	3,909	50.90%	+4.75%
Liberal	Charles Morton Dunn	3,771	49.10%	+0.41%
Total		7,680	100.00%	

1938 Saskatchewan general election: Humboldt
Party	Candidate	Votes	%	±%
Liberal	James Chisholm King	3,636	48.69%	-23.51%
CCF	Joseph William Burton	3,446	46.15%	+18.35%
Social Credit	John Joseph Lins	385	5.16%	–
Total		7,467	100.00%	

November 19, 1935 By-Election: Humboldt
Party	Candidate	Votes	%	±%
Liberal	James Chisholm King	4,540	72.20%	+6.34%
CCF	Joseph William Burton	1,748	27.80%	-6.34%
Total		6,288	100.00%	

1934 Saskatchewan general election: Humboldt
Party	Candidate	Votes	%	±%
Liberal	James Hogan	5,345	65.86%	+7.08%
Farmer-Labour	Joseph William Burton	2,771	34.14%	–
Total		8,116	100.00%	

1929 Saskatchewan general election: Humboldt
Party	Candidate	Votes	%	±%
Liberal	Henry M. Therres	3,251	58.78%	-3.34%
Independent	Jacob H. Riesen	2,280	41.22%	–
Total		5,531	100.00%	

1925 Saskatchewan general election: Humboldt
Party	Candidate	Votes	%	±%
Independent Liberal	Henry M. Therres	2,653	62.12%	
Liberal	Arnold Loehr	1,618	37.88%	
Total		4,271	100.00%	

1921 Saskatchewan general election: Humboldt
Party	Candidate	Votes	%	±%
Liberal	Henry M. Therres	Acclaimed	100.00%	
Total		Acclamation		

1917 Saskatchewan general election: Humboldt
Party	Candidate	Votes	%	±%
Liberal	William Ferdinand Alphonse Turgeon	2,180	71.01%	-4.45%
Conservative	Alexander Donald MacIntosh	890	28.99%	+4.45%
Total		3,070	100.00%	

1912 Saskatchewan general election: Humboldt
Party	Candidate	Votes	%	±%
Liberal	William Ferdinand Alphonse Turgeon	1,073	75.46%	+6.03%
Conservative	Alexander Donald MacIntosh	349	24.54%	–
Total		1,422	100.00%	

December 7, 1908 By-Election: Humboldt
Party	Candidate	Votes	%	±%
Liberal	William Richard Motherwell	847	69.43%	-3.60%
Independent	Sinclair Elliott	373	30.57%	–
Total		1,220	100.00%	

1908 Saskatchewan general election: Humboldt
Party	Candidate	Votes	%	±%
Liberal	David B. Neely	759	65.83%	
Independent Liberal	Lewis Lawrence Kramer	394	34.17%	
Total		1,153	100.00%	

1905 Saskatchewan general election: Humboldt
Party	Candidate	Votes	%	±%
Liberal	David B. Neely	Acclaimed	100.00%	
Total		Acclamation		

== History ==
=== Members of the Legislative Assembly – Humboldt ===
#	MLA	Served	Party
1.	David B. Neely	1905–1908	Liberal
2.	William Richard Motherwell	Dec. 1908–1912	Liberal
3.	William Turgeon	1912–1921	Liberal
4.	Henry M. Therres	1921–1934	Liberal, Ind. Liberal
5.	James Hogan	1934–1935	Liberal
6.	James Chisholm King	Nov. 1935–1938	Liberal
7.	Joseph William Burton	Sept. 1938–1944	CCF
8.	Ben Putnam	1944–1948	CCF
9.	Arnold Loehr	1948–1952	Liberal
10.	Joseph William Burton	1952–1956	CCF
11.	Mary Batten	1956–1964	Liberal
12.	Mathieu Breker	1964–1971	Liberal
13.	Edwin Tchorzewski	1971–1982	New Democrat
14.	Louis Domotor	1982–1986	Progressive Conservative
15.	Eric Upshall	1986–1995	New Democrat
16.	Arlene Julé	1995–1997	Liberal
17.	Arlene Julé	1997–2003	Saskatchewan Party

== See also ==
- List of Saskatchewan provincial electoral districts
- List of Saskatchewan general elections
- Canadian provincial electoral districts
