= Gene Makowsky =

Canadian politician (born 1973)

The Honourable Gene Makowsky ECS
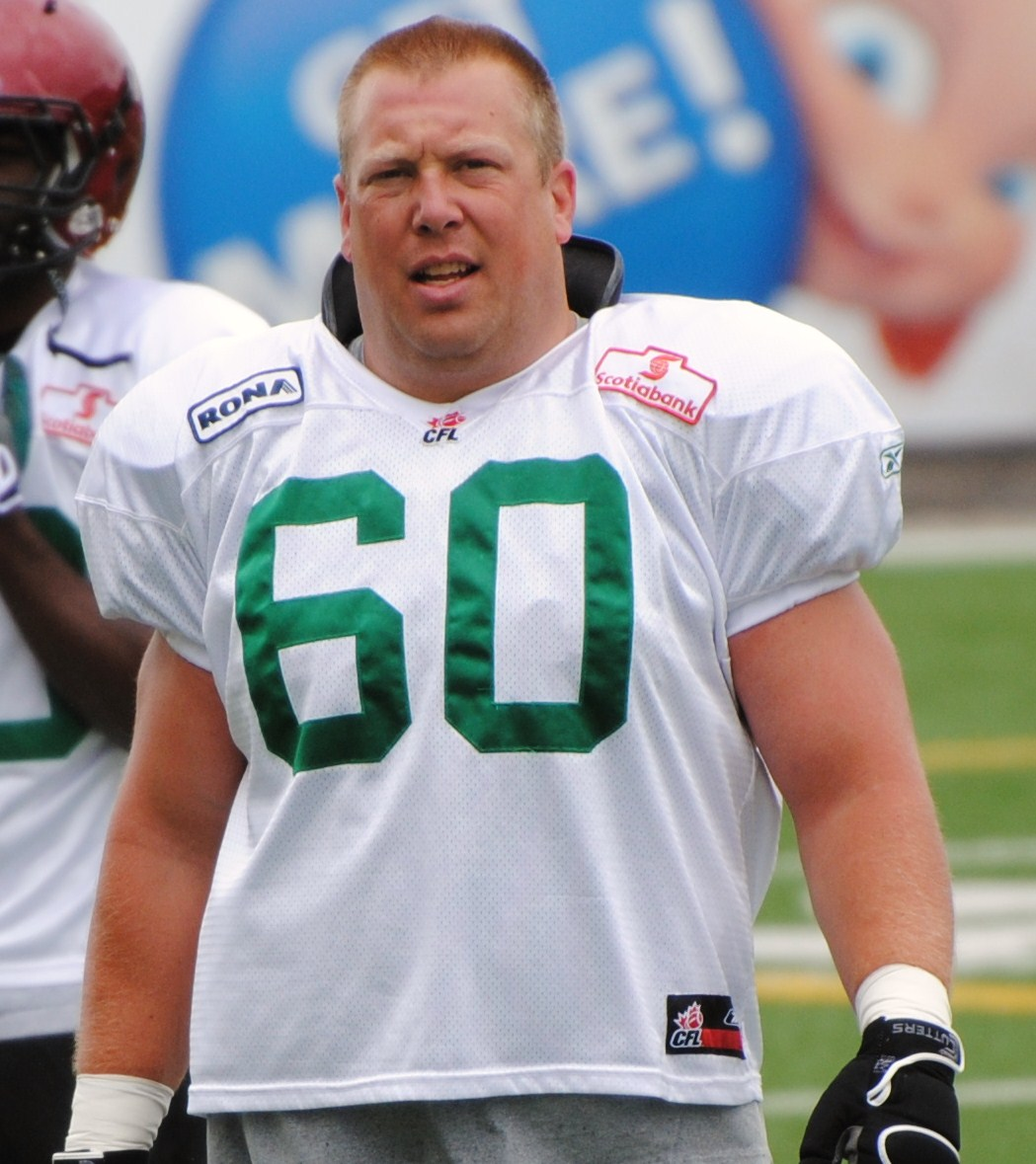
- Makowsky with the Saskatchewan Roughriders in 2010

Member of the Saskatchewan Legislative Assembly for Regina Gardiner Park Regina Dewdney (2011-2016)
- In office November 7, 2011 – October 1, 2024
- Preceded by: Kevin Yates
- Succeeded by: Constituency abolished

Personal details
- Born: April 17, 1973 (age 53) Saskatoon, Saskatchewan, Canada
- Party: Saskatchewan Party
- Education: University of Saskatchewan
- Occupation: Professional athlete
- Football career

Profile
- Positions: Guard, Offensive tackle

Personal information
- Listed height: 6 ft 3 in (1.91 m)
- Listed weight: 264 lb (120 kg)

Career information
- High school: Walter Murray Collegiate
- University: Saskatchewan
- CFL draft: 1995: 2nd round, 23rd overall pick

Career history
- 1995–2011: Saskatchewan Roughriders

Awards and highlights
- Grey Cup champion (2007); 2× CFL's Most Outstanding Offensive Lineman Award (2004, 2005); 3× DeMarco-Becket Memorial Trophy (2004, 2005, 2008); 5× CFL All-Star (2004–2006, 2008, 2009); 7× CFL West All-Star (2004–2010)
- Stats at CFL.ca (archive)
- Canadian Football Hall of Fame (Class of 2015)

Gene Makowsky (born April 17, 1973) is a Canadian politician and former professional football offensive lineman. He was a member of the Saskatchewan Legislative Assembly from 2011 to 2024, representing the ridings of Regina Dewdney and Regina Gardiner Park as a member of the Saskatchewan Party.

Prior to his political career, Makowsky played 17 seasons for the Saskatchewan Roughriders of the Canadian Football League.

== Early life ==
Born in Saskatoon, Saskatchewan, Makowsky graduated from high school at Walter Murray Collegiate in 1991.

== University of Saskatchewan ==
During his 4 years at the University of Saskatchewan, Makowsky helped the U of S Huskies to two Hardy Cup Championships, as well as being named to the Canada West All Star team in 1994. He was selected 23rd overall by the Saskatchewan Roughriders in the 1995 CFL draft.

== CFL career ==
Makowsky played 17 seasons in the CFL—all with the Saskatchewan Roughriders. He earned the CFL's Most Outstanding Offensive Lineman Award in 2004 and 2005 and was a finalist for the award in 2008. He was a 5 time CFL All Star and a West Division All Star for seven consecutive years (2004 through 2010). On August 5, 2011, Makowsky made history, playing in his 272nd game, surpassing Roger Aldag for most games played by a Saskatchewan Roughrider.

After Saskatchewan defeated the Winnipeg Blue Bombers in the 2007 Grey Cup game, Makowsky was presented the Grey Cup by Commissioner Mark Cohon.

Makowsky retired from the CFL on February 17, 2012, after playing in 16 playoff games, 4 Grey Cup games, and a Saskatchewan Roughrider record 284 regular season games. In 2015, he was inducted into the Canadian Football Hall of Fame.

== Political career ==
Makowsky was elected as a member of the Legislative Assembly of Saskatchewan in the 2011 provincial election, representing the constituency of Regina Dewdney. He was re-elected in the 2016 provincial election in the redistributed electoral district of Regina Gardiner Park, and was re-elected again in the 2020 election. Regina Gardiner Park was eliminated in 2024 general election and Makowski chose to stand in the newly redistributed Regina University, but lost to NDP candidate Sally Housser.

Makowsky is a member of the Saskatchewan Party.

== Popular culture ==
Makowsky, along with his then teammate Matt Dominguez, made a cameo appearance in the Corner Gas episode "Reader Pride".

== Cabinet positions ==
Saskatchewan provincial government of Scott Moe
Cabinet posts (3)
Predecessor	Office	Successor
Lori Carr	Minister of Social Services; May 31, 2022–November 7, 2024	Terry Jenson
Tina Beaudry-Mellor	Minister of Advanced Education; November 9, 2020–May 31, 2022	Gordon Wyant
cont'd from Wall Ministry	Minister of Parks, Culture and Sport; February 2, 2018–November 9, 2020	Laura Ross
Saskatchewan provincial government of Brad Wall
Cabinet post (1)
Predecessor	Office	Successor
Ken Cheveldayoff	Minister of Parks, Culture and Sport; August 30, 2017–February 2, 2018	cont'd into Moe Ministry
