= Gary Grewal =

Canadian politician

Member of the Saskatchewan Legislative Assembly for Regina Northeast
- In office October 26, 2020 – October 1, 2024
- Preceded by: Yens Pedersen
- Succeeded by: Jacqueline Roy

Personal details
- Party: Saskatchewan Party
- Occupation: Business owner

Gary Grewal is a Canadian politician, who was elected to the Legislative Assembly of Saskatchewan in the 2020 Saskatchewan general election. He represented the district of Regina Northeast as a member of the Saskatchewan Party for one term. Grewal was the first Indo-Canadian elected to the Legislature.

== Before politics ==
Grewal immigrated to Canada from India in 1983. He served as president of the India Canada Association of Saskatchewan as well as the Sikh Society, and as director of the Canadian Cricket Association. Cricket Canada was suspended by the International Cricket Council (ICC) in June 2026 due to severe governance failures, financial mismanagement, and alleged ties to organized crime. He is married and has three children.

== Political career ==
Grewal's first bid for office came in a 2018 by-election in Regina Northeast following the resignation of Kevin Doherty; Grewal finished second in the by-election to Yens Pedersen of the New Democratic Party (NDP). In the general election two years later, Grewal won Regina Northeast in a re-match against Pedersen. The win made Grewal the first Indo-Canadian elected to the Saskatchewan Legislature.

In July 2023, a Regina man was charged with extortion for threatening Grewal after Grewal declined to help him in a local campaign.

In November 2023, the Opposition NDP raised concerns in the legislature about contracts between the Ministry of Social Services and the Sunrise Motel in Regina, a business owned by Grewal. It was alleged that prices were increased for social services clients. By February 2024, the NDP revealed evidence that the Sunrise and the Thriftlodge Hotel—another business in which Grewal held a stake—had received close to $400,000 from social services clients in the previous fiscal year.

Later in February 2024, Grewal announced that he would not be running in the 2024 Saskatchewan general election.

In May 2024, the NDP made a formal request for a conflict of interest investigation in regards to Grewal's businesses. Five months later, the conflict of interest commissioner released their ruling that Grewal had breached conflict of interest rules in relation to the government contracts. The Sunrise—at which Grewal's wife was employed as a bookkeeper—and Thriftlodge businesses were found to have received $731,000 from the Ministry of Social Services after Grewal's 2020 election. The commissioner ruled that Grewal had failed to disclose interests in the businesses when elected, and that he failed to call in a loan to the Thriftlodge by a specified deadline. Grewal released a statement disagreeing with the findings, stating that he did not see the arrangements as government contracts, and alleging that he was not informed of the need to call in the Thriftlodge loan. The Saskatchewan Party released a statement saying it accepted the findings of the investigation.

== Electoral results ==
2020 Saskatchewan general election: Regina Northeast
Party	Candidate	Votes	%
Saskatchewan	Gary Grewal	3,709	49.60
New Democratic	Yens Pedersen	3,259	43.58
Progressive Conservative	Corie Rempel	272	3.64
Green	Anthony Majore	135	1.80
Liberal	Jeff Walters	103	1.38
Total		7,478	100.00
Source: Elections Saskatchewan

September 12, 2018 by election: Regina Northeast
Party	Candidate	Votes	%
New Democratic	Yens Pedersen	2,689	54.01
Saskatchewan	Gary Grewal	1,948	39.12
Progressive Conservative	Ken Grey	142	2.85
Green	Jessica Schroeder	96	1.93
Liberal	Reid Hill	67	1.35
Western Independence	Mark W. Regel	37	0.74
Total valid votes		4,979	100.00
Source: Saskatchewan Archives - Election Results by Electoral Division
