= Stuart John Cameron =

Canadian politician

MLA for Regina South
- In office 1975–1978
- Succeeded by: Paul Rousseau

Personal details
- Born: May 15, 1939 (age 87) Maple Creek, Saskatchewan
- Party: Liberal Party of Saskatchewan
- Occupation: Lawyer

Stuart John Cameron (born May 15, 1939) is a retired Canadian politician, lawyer, and judge. He was born in Maple Creek, Saskatchewan, and served in the Legislative Assembly of Saskatchewan from 1975 to 1978, as a Liberal member for the constituency of Regina South.

Cameron was appointed to the Saskatchewan Court of Queen's Bench in 1980 and then to the Saskatchewan Court of Appeal in 1981.
