= Charles Wallace Stewart =

Canadian politician

Member of Parliament for Humboldt
- In office December 1921 – October 1925
- Preceded by: Norman Lang
- Succeeded by: Albert Frederick Totzke

Personal details
- Born: Charles Wallace Stewart; 9 June 1885 York County, Ontario
- Died: 4 March 1950 (aged 64) Saanich, British Columbia
- Party: Progressive
- Spouse: Frances Helen Singer
- Profession: farmer

Charles Wallace Stewart (9 June 1885 – 4 March 1950) was a Progressive party member of the House of Commons of Canada. He was born in York County, Ontario and became a farmer. From 1908 to 1918, he was reeve of Pleasantdale, Saskatchewan,

The son of Stephen W.L Stewart and Sarah Pattenden, Stewart was educated in Brandon, Manitoba and Winnipeg. In 1911, he married Frances H. Singer. He was elected to Parliament at the Humboldt riding in the 1921 general election. After serving his only federal term, the 14th Canadian Parliament, Stewart was defeated in the 1925 federal election by Albert Frederick Totzke of the Liberal party. He died of liver and colon cancer in 1950.
