= Broten =

Broten is a surname. Notable people with the surname include:

- Aaron Broten (born 1960), American ice hockey player
- Cam Broten (born 1978), Canadian politician
- Hans Broten (1916–1992), Canadian politician
- Laurel Broten, Canadian politician
- Neal Broten (born 1959), American ice hockey player
- Paul Broten (born 1965), American ice hockey player
