= Norman Lang =

Norman Lang may refer to:

- Norman Lang (politician) (1887–1930), farmer, rancher and political figure in Saskatchewan, Canada
- Norman Lang (bishop) (1875–1956), Suffragan Bishop of Leicester, 1913–1927
