= North Regina, Regina =

North Regina is a neighbourhood in the Northeast quadrant of the city of Regina, Saskatchewan.

Postwar, the city adopted a de facto metropolitan form of government by annexing the independent village of "North Regina", located around the Canadian National Railway yards in the city's northwest, and what was then called the "North Annex"—a motley collection of houses outside the city's northern limits along Broad Street, but within the Rural Municipality of Sherwood, which surrounds the city. In both cases, the prime motivating factor in amalgamation was the prospect of these districts getting connected to the city's water lines for drinking water and sewage. Financial aid from the provincial government eased this process.

== Demographics ==
Prior to January 1, 1951, North Regina was incorporated as a village, and was amalgamated with the City of Regina on that date.

== See also ==
- List of neighbourhoods in Regina
