= List of neighbourhoods in Regina, Saskatchewan =

Regina, Saskatchewan has several subdivisions which are classified as suburban, industrial, residential, or green space park areas. Regina neighbourhood zones include several neighbourhoods. The Regina planning department has listed such neighbourhoods and provided profiles for each, including statistics according to the 2001 census as regards population density, marital status, family structure, private households, occupation of the neighbourhood labour force, household income, education level, type, condition and age of housing, mode of transportation, and housing by tenure. The 2006 census city neighbourhood profiles were released in 2008.

The newest neighbourhood concept revolves around on street greenways. The city's building blocks comprise approximately 16 hectares (40 acres) and 2,500 residents. The Southwest Sector bounded by the airport (north) and Hwy #1 between Lewvan Drive and Courtney Street is under development currently to introduce the new street greenway neighbourhood concept and CPETD (crime prevention through environmental design) principles. It will comprise building a town centre to serve three community construction phases which will in turn encompass four or five neighbourhoods each. As well another development for Regina will see Southeast Sector development. Four new communities are being proposed which will mean construction of three to five new 2,500 residential neighbourhoods in each community. This would create development between the current south east corner of Regina to the future bypass road. Note that the following table, despite having been drawn from information provided on the City of Regina website, contains numerous glaring and egregious errors of spelling.

Statistics Canada & City of Regina Planning Department Neighbourhoods; City of Regina Planning Department Subdivisions
Neighbourhood	List of Regina subdivisions		
CENTRAL ZONE; Al Ritchie; Cathedral; Core Group; Downtown; Eastview; Gladmer Park; North Central; Transitional Area; EAST ZONE; . Greens on Gardiner; Arcola East - North; Arcola East - South; Boothill; Glencairn; Glenelm; NORTH ZONE; Argyle Park-Englewood; Coronation Park; Northeast; Uplands; SOUTH ZONE; Albert Park; Hillsdale; Lakeview; Whitmore Park; WEST ZONE; Dieppe; McNab; Normanview; Normanview West; Prairie View; Regent Park; Rosemont/Mount Royal; Sherwood/McCarthy; Twin Lakes; Walsh Acres / Lakeridge	Albert Park; Arcola Sub; Argyle Park; Arnhem Place; Assiniboia East; Assiniboia Place; Balbrigan Place; Belvedere; Broders Annex; Churchill Place; City View; Connaught Park; Coronation Park; Coventry Place; CPR Annex; Creekside; Crescents; Dewdney Place; Dieppe Place; Dominion Heights; Douglas Park; Douglas Place; Eastern Annex; Eastgate; Eastpoint Estates; Fairways West; Garden Ridge; Gardiner Heights; Glencairn; Glencairn Village; Glen Elm Park; Glen Elm Park South; Grand Trunk Annex	Harbour Landing; Highland Park; Hillsdale; Industrial Centre; Industrial Ross; Innismore; Kensington Greens; Lakeridge; Lakesidge Gardens; Lakeview; Lakeview Annex; Lakeview Centre; Lakeview South; Lakewood; Lewvan Park; Maple Ridge; Mayfair; McCarthy Park; Mirror Sun Gardens; Mount Pleasant; Mount Royal; Normandy Heights; Normanview; Normanview West; Normanview West Addition; North Regina; North Annex; Old 33; Parkridge; Parkview; Parliament Place; Pasqua Place; Premier Place	Regent Park; Richmond Place; River Bend; River Heights; Riverside; Rochdale Park; Rosemont; Rosemont North; Rosemont South; Rothwell Place; Sherwood Estates; South Lakeview see Lakeview South; Spruce Meadows; Transcona; Tuxedo Park; University Park; University Park East; Uplands; Varsity Park; Walsh Acres; Wascana Addition; Wascana Crescents; Wascana Park; Wascana View; Washington Park; Westhill; Westridge; Whitmore Park; Windsor Park; Windsor Place; Wood Meadows; Woodland Grove

== Community Associations ==
Eleven Regina community associations serve more than one Regina subdivision and neighbourhood. Sherwood McCarthy, Prairie View, Normanview and McNab serve Regina's north of the rail line and west of Albert Street. North of the rail line and east of Albert Street is served by Uplands community association as well as the North East Community Association. Core Group, Al Ritchie, Boothill, and Arcola East are the community associations which facilitate leisure activities and community interests of the southeast Regina areas. Lakeview serves the southwest Regina subdivisions.
