= Alan Joseph Adamson =

Canadian politician

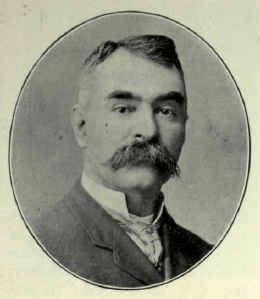

Member of the Canadian Parliament for Humboldt
- In office 1904–1908
- Preceded by: The electoral district was created in 1903.
- Succeeded by: David Bradley Neely

Personal details
- Born: August 1, 1857 Clifden, County Galway, Ireland
- Died: April 3, 1928 (aged 70) Limona, Florida, United States
- Party: Liberal
- Occupation: Banker

Alan Joseph Adamson (August 1, 1857 – April 4, 1928) was a Canadian politician and banker.

Born in Clifden, County Galway, Ireland, the son of John Evans Adamson and Harietta Bell, he was educated in Dublin and came to western Canada in 1873. He married Julia Turriff, who was the sister of John Gillanders Turriff, in 1882. In 1883, Adamson moved to Winnipeg and became involved in the grain trade. In 1899, he went to Rosthern, Saskatchewan, where he established the Canadian Territories Corporation, which became one of the largest land agencies in western Canada and also operated as a private bank; Adamson served as its president and manager. He was also a director of the Northern Bank and of the Saskatchewan Valley and Manitoba Land Company and president of the Western Trust Company.

Adamson was elected to the House of Commons of Canada as the Liberal candidate for the riding of Humboldt in the 1904 federal election. He did not stand for re-election in the 1908 election.

His son John Evans Adamson was Chief Justice of Manitoba.
