= Jacqueline Roy =

Saskatchewan politician

Jacqueline Roy MLA

Member of the Saskatchewan Legislative Assembly for Regina Northeast
- Incumbent
- Assumed office October 28, 2024
- Preceded by: Gary Grewal

Shadow Minister for Status of Women, Human Rights and Francophone Affairs
- Incumbent
- Assumed office November 13, 2024
- Preceded by: Nathaniel Teed

Personal details
- Born: Regina, Saskatchewan, Canada
- Party: Saskatchewan NDP
- Education: University of Regina
- Occupation: Teacher

Jacqueline Roy is a Canadian politician who was elected to the Legislative Assembly of Saskatchewan in the 2024 general election, representing Regina Northeast as a member of the New Democratic Party.

== Before politics ==
Born and raised in Regina, Jacqueline completed her primary education in French before earning a Bachelor of Arts and a Bachelor of Education from the University of Regina and becoming a teacher in the Regina Public School system. Jacqueline also served as a Saskatchewan Teachers’ Federation (STF) Provincial Councillor.

== Political career ==
As a first-time MLA Jacqueline has focused on holding the government to account on various issues including delays in emergency rooms and advocating for victims of sexual assaults.

After starting as the Shadow minister for the Status of Women, and Francophone Affairs. Jacqueline additionally become the shadow minister for women’s health in early 2026.

== Electoral Record ==
2024 Saskatchewan general election
Party	Candidate	Votes	%	±%
New Democratic	Jacqueline Roy	3,660	50.73	+8.43
Saskatchewan	Rahul Singh	3,153	43.70	-7.90
Progress	Kate Tremblay	253	3.51	+2.41
Green	Anthony Thomas Majore	149	2.07	-0.13
Total valid votes		7,215	99.13	
Total rejected ballots		63	0.87	+0.43
Turnout		7,278	59.14	+0.62
Eligible voters		12,307		
Source: Elections Saskatchewan
New Democratic gain		Swing		
