= Joseph Ingolph Hetland =

Canadian politician (1896–1982)

Member of Parliament for Humboldt
- In office June 1949 – August 1953
- Preceded by: Joseph William Burton
- Succeeded by: riding dissolved

Personal details
- Born: 30 July 1896 Chicago, Illinois, United States
- Died: 10 March 1982 (aged 85) Saskatoon, Saskatchewan, Canada
- Party: Liberal
- Spouse(s): Olena Brenna m. 1 November 1922
- Profession: farmer

Joseph Ingolph Hetland (30 July 1896 – 10 March 1982) was a Liberal party member of the House of Commons of Canada. He was born in Chicago, Illinois, United States and moved to Canada in 1907.

Hetland attended school at Watson, Saskatchewan then studied at the Agricultural College in Fargo, North Dakota. He became a farmer by career, a municipal councillor from 1929 to 1932 and a school trustee from 1931 to 1943.

He was first elected to Parliament at the Humboldt riding in the 1949 general election. After serving one term in the House of Commons, the Humboldt riding had been disbanded and Hetland campaigned at the new Humboldt—Melfort riding but lost to Hugh Alexander Bryson of the Co-operative Commonwealth Federation.

Hetland died on 10 March 1982.
