= Percy (2020 film) =

2020 biographical film directed by Clark Johnson

- Poster
- Directed by: Clark Johnson
- Written by: Garfield Lindsay Miller; Hilary Pyror
- Produced by: Daniel Bekerman; Ethan Lazar; Ian Dimerman; Garfield Lindsay Miller; Hilary Pryor; Brendon Sawatzky
- Starring: Christopher Walken; Christina Ricci; Zach Braff; Luke Kirby; Adam Beach; Martin Donovan; Roberta Maxwell; Peter Stebbings
- Cinematography: Luc Montpellier
- Edited by: Susan Maggi; Geoff Ashenhurst; Maureen Grant
- Music by: Steven MacKinnon
- Production companies: Deepak Kumar Films; Grasshopper + Marks Production; Mansa Productions; Productivity Media; Scythia Films
- Distributed by: Mongrel Media
- Release dates: September 16, 2020 (Quebec City Film Festival); October 9, 2020 (Canada)
- Running time: 99 minutes
- Countries: United States; Canada; India
- Language: English

Percy (also known as Percy vs Goliath) is a 2020 Canadian-American-Indian biographical drama film, directed by Clark Johnson from a screenplay by Garfield Lindsay Miller and Hilary Pryor. It stars Christopher Walken, Christina Ricci, Zach Braff, Luke Kirby, Adam Beach, Martin Donovan, Roberta Maxwell and Peter Stebbings. The film follows 70-year-old small-town Saskatchewan farmer Percy Schmeiser, who takes on a giant corporation after their GMOs interfere with his crops.

The film premiered at the 2020 Quebec City Film Festival and it was theatrically released in Canada by Mongrel Media on October 9, 2020.

== Plot ==
Based on the events of Schmeiser v. Monsanto, Percy Schmeiser is a Saskatchewan canola farmer who has received a legal action from Monsanto. It states that it has been determined that Percy's fields contained Monsanto's Roundup resistant crops and accuses him of intellectual property theft. He unknowingly planted seeds that belonged to Monsanto during 1997; Monsanto wants all of his seeds and the profits he made with his work the following year. Percy was a seed saver and didn't use Monsanto's seeds, but his neighbors did and he believed this was a case of contamination. Seeking legal help from local lawyer Jackson Weaver, it becomes evident that he was losing the battle, as the laws favored Monsanto.

Percy's life begins to suffer under the weight of the court-case. He and his family have become the community's pariah and his debts continue to mount. Rebecca Salcau, a representative of the People's Environmental Protect (PEP), offers to help, but it will mean Percy will have to speak publicly against Monsanto to gain media attention and earn revenue to fund his fight. Initially resistant in making it into a public spectacle, Percy becomes enraged when he discovers that Monsanto's men have been following him and destroying his reputation by labelling him as a thief. Fired up, Percy begins engaging in public speaking events against Monsanto.

Percy's public speaking and media exposure begin to take on a life of its own. People throughout the world begin offering donations and letters of support. As the fight against Monsanto continues, Percy realizes his situation isn't unique and is a global concern. While speaking in India, Percy learns the devastating effects that the agribusiness has caused, especially farmers who have been committing suicide over severe debt and ruined lives. When he returns home, his wife has been hospitalized with a broken arm and it seems they're slated to lose again.

Jackson doesn't believe they'll win, but feels obligated to advise Percy that he could still appeal to the Supreme Court. Rebecca's own people can't financially support Percy anymore and withdraw their support. Percy is ready to admit defeat, but with the encouragement of his wife, he decides to appeal to the Supreme Court. When Jackson learns about Percy's decision to fight, he offers his letter of resignation; but Percy rips it up and they go straight to work. Ultimately, the Supreme Court determines that Percy can keep his farm, but has to give up all of the Roundup Ready seeds to Monsanto. With his home saved, the town now sees Percy in a better light and he returns Monsanto's property to them. Rebecca comes to tell Percy that his fight with Monsanto had persuaded Canadian farmers not to grow Monsanto's GMO wheat, and then US farmers follow suit, halting Monsanto's hold on wheat production. Percy resumes his work on the farm, preparing for the next season while his granddaughter is excited to take it over one day.

== Cast ==
- Christopher Walken as Percy Schmeiser
- Christina Ricci as Rebecca Salcau
- Zach Braff as Jackson Weaver
- Luke Kirby as Peter Schmeiser
- Adam Beach as Alton Kelly
- Martin Donovan as Rick Aarons
- Roberta Maxwell as Louise Schmeiser

== Production ==
In September 2018, Christopher Walken, Christina Ricci, Luke Kirby, Adam Beach, Martin Donovan, Roberta Maxwell, Peter Stebbings and Zach Braff joined the cast of the film, with Clark Johnson directing from a screenplay by Garfield Lindsay Miller and Hilary Pryor. Principal photography began in Winnipeg that same month.

== Reception ==
On the review aggregator website Rotten Tomatoes, the film has a 76% approval rating, based on 49 reviews, with an average rating of 6.2/10. The website's consensus reads, "Percy vs Goliath teeters toward heavy-handed messaging, but Christopher Walken's work in the central role helps keep this fact-based story upright."

Schmeiser himself did not comment on the film. He was gravely ill with Parkinson's disease by 2020, and died four days after its general release on October 13, 2020.
