= John Evans Adamson =

Canadian lawyer and judge

John Evans Adamson (9 September 1884 – 22 December 1961) was a Canadian lawyer and judge. He was Chief Justice of Manitoba from 1955 to 1961, the first native-born Manitoban to hold the post.

He was the son of Alan Joseph Adamson.
