= Andrew Thomson (Canadian politician) =

Canadian politician

The Honourable Andrew Thomson ECS

MLA for Regina South
- In office June 20, 1995 – November 20, 2007
- Preceded by: Serge Kujawa
- Succeeded by: Bill Hutchinson

Personal details
- Born: July 16, 1967 (age 59) Kindersley, Saskatchewan, Canada
- Party: New Democrat

Andrew Thomson (born July 16, 1967) is a Canadian politician, who was a member of the NDP caucus in the Legislative Assembly of Saskatchewan from 1995 to 2007. While in government, he held several cabinet posts, including Minister of Finance, Learning, Corrections and Public Safety, Energy and Mines, and Minister Responsible for Information Technology, SaskEnergy, and SaskPower.

== Background ==
Thomson was born in Kindersley, Saskatchewan, and raised in Kindersley and Prince Albert. He has a bachelor's degree in political studies from the University of Saskatchewan, and worked in the government of Roy Romanow as a ministerial assistant after graduating.

== Political career ==
He was first elected to the Legislative Assembly of Saskatchewan in 1995, and was re-elected with increased pluralities in 1999 and 2003 representing the riding of Regina South.

Thomson was brought into cabinet by Lorne Calvert as Minister of Energy and Mines in 2001. In this portfolio, he proposed the reduction of oil and gas royalties to stimulate drilling in the Souris Basin that was being effected by low oil prices, introduced the greenprint for ethanol production for the province, and handled Saskatchewan's approach to the Kyoto Accord implementation. The department was abolished in the government restructuring of March 2002, at which time Thomson was assigned the newly created Corrections and Public Safety portfolio as well as the newly created Ministry of Information Technology.

Despite controversy related to proposed outsourcing of the government's information technology operations, as Minister of Information Technology, Thomson pursued the consolidation of government IT services and advocated large scale broadband connectivity across the province for program delivery. His work to advance the CommunityNet program provided the foundation for commercial high-speed broadband services across rural and urban communities that reach 86% of the population. In 2007 he introduced a program to bring free Wi-Fi to university and college campuses and select urban areas. As a result of the work, the province has now pushed for full connectivity, further bolstering its recognition in the sector as being a leader for broadband connectivity in North America.

As Minister of Learning, he introduced changes to reduce by two-thirds the number of elected school boards in the province while creating new school councils to better involve parents in the education process. The NDP's finance and governance reforms also included changes to the Foundation Operating Grant formulae to put greater emphasis on equity of per-pupil funding. To assist in implementing these large reforms and in response to public criticism that the reforms would result in an acceleration of small rural school closures, he ordered a moratorium on all school closures for a three-year period. The reforms were criticised by the opposition but have remained in place despite the change in government following the 2007 general election.

At the post-secondary level Thomson commissioned changes to the community college structure to improve their ability to meet Saskatchewan's labour market needs. He introduced a new graduate tax credit that would allow recent graduates to earn up to $100,000 over a five-year period tax free if they started their careers in Saskatchewan. He also introduced a four-year freeze on university tuitions, despite initially opposing the idea.

=== Minister of Finance ===
As the rookie Minister of Finance during a period of rising resource revenues, including $1 billion in oil revenue alone, Thomson announced a then record $7.7 billion budget, and introduced several large tax cuts. These cuts included cutting the corporate form 17% to 14% and cutting the 0.6% capital gains tax in half, while promising the further lower the former to 12% and eliminate the latter altogether. The budget also expanded health funding by $200 million, including $4.9 million to the University of Saskatchewan's College of Medicine, an increase in education spending, as well as an increase in welfare rates. The budget's financial projection were based on a $60 barrel of oil.

This was followed in 2007 by introduction of the graduate tax credit and a cap on prescription drug costs for seniors. Despite concerns by the opposition that the cuts were too deep and unsustainable, the province posted a $2 billion surplus that year and remained in a strong financial position. This budget was balanced by taking just over $500 million from the Fiscal Stabilization Fund, the province's emergency contingency fund, an act criticized, but continued, by SaskParty Leader Brad Wall.

In 2013, six years after Thomson left office, Saskatchewan's then auditor (and later auditor general for Ontario), Bonnie Lysyk said that if Saskatchewan had used the same accounting standards as the federal government and all other Canadian provinces, nine out of ten budgets, should have been presented as deficit, not surplus. However, she also notes that both of Thomson's budgets achieved actual surpluses of $575M and $1.9B using her preferred accounting standards.

Thomson's time in finance was also marked by an ongoing battle with the federal government over the impact Saskatchewan's growing oil wealth had on equalization payments. On May 11, 2007, Thomson announced he would not seek re-election. Premier Lorne Calvert shuffled his cabinet on May 31, 2007, replacing Thomson as finance minister with Pat Atkinson.

=== Leaving provincial politics, entering federal politics ===
After his departure from provincial politics, Thomson worked in the private sector and moved to Toronto. In 2015, he returned to politics as the federal NDP's candidate in the Toronto riding of Eglinton—Lawrence for the 2015 federal election finishing third.

Thomson is the first known LGBT provincial legislator in Saskatchewan, although it wasn't made public during his tenure as an MLA in that province.

In November 2016, Thomson was hired as the chief of government relations at the University of Toronto.

== Electoral record ==
=== Provincial ===
2003 Saskatchewan general election: Regina South
Party	Candidate	Votes	%	±%
New Democratic	Andrew Thomson	4,662	49.47%	+10.47
Saskatchewan	Jim Roberts	2,646	28.08%	−1.67
Liberal	S. Debbie Ward	1,994	21.16%	−6.87
New Green	Garry Ashworth Ewart	97	1.03%	−2.23
Western Independence	Shea Ritter	25	0.27%	–
Total		9,424	100.00%	

1999 Saskatchewan general election
Party	Candidate	Votes	%	±%
NDP	Andrew Thomson	3,324	38.99%	-9.12
Saskatchewan	Terri Harris	2,533	29.71%	–
Liberal	David Huliyappa	2,390	28.04%	-16.38
New Green	Peter Borch	278	3.26%	–
Total		8,525	100.00%	

1995 Saskatchewan general election
Party	Candidate	Votes	%	±%
NDP	Andrew Thomson	4,139	48.11%	+1.68
Liberal	Ross Keith	3,821	44.42%	+10.85
Progressive Conservative	John Weir	643	7.47%	-11.39
Total		8,603	100.00%	

=== Federal ===
2015 Canadian federal election: Eglinton—Lawrence
Party	Candidate	Votes	%	±%	Expenditures
Liberal	Marco Mendicino	27,278	48.89	+10.47	$155,849.60
Conservative	Joe Oliver	23,788	42.64	-4.18	$183,256.52
New Democratic	Andrew Thomson	3,505	6.28	-5.32	$114,205.95
Green	Matthew Chisholm	799	1.43	-1.74	$217.60
Libertarian	Ethan Buchman	308	0.55	–	–
Animal Alliance	Rudy Brunell Solomonvici	114	0.20	–	$5,129.72
Total valid votes/expense limit		55,792	100.00		$210,250.86
Total rejected ballots		328	0.58		
Turnout		56,120	72.45		
Eligible voters		77,463			
Liberal gain from Conservative		Swing		+7.32	
Source: Elections Canada
