= Mathieu Theodore Breker =

Canadian politician

Assembly Member for Humboldt
- In office 1964–1971
- Preceded by: Mary John Batten
- Succeeded by: Ed Tchorzewski

Personal details
- Born: February 15, 1928 Englefeld, Saskatchewan
- Died: November 20, 2008 (aged 80) Humboldt, Saskatchewan
- Party: Saskatchewan Liberal Party

Mathieu Theodore "Matt" Breker (February 15, 1928 – November 20, 2008) was a farmer, pharmacist and political figure in Saskatchewan, Canada. He represented Humboldt from 1964 to 1971 in the Legislative Assembly of Saskatchewan as a Liberal.

He was born in Englefeld, Saskatchewan and was educated in Humboldt and at the University of Saskatchewan, receiving a B.A. and a BSc in pharmacy. Breker was defeated by Edwin Tchorzewski when he ran for reelection to the assembly in 1971. He was mayor of Humboldt from 1973 to 1980 and from 1985 to 1990. Breker died at St. Mary's Villa in Humboldt at the age of 80.
