= Arlene Julé =

Canadian politician

Assembly Member for Humboldt
- In office 1995–2003
- Preceded by: Eric Upshall
- Succeeded by: Donna Harpauer

Personal details
- Born: March 18, 1946 (age 80) Saskatoon, Saskatchewan
- Party: Saskatchewan Liberal Party → Saskatchewan Party

Arlene G. Julé (born March 18, 1946) is a Canadian politician, who represented the electoral district of Humboldt in the Legislative Assembly of Saskatchewan from 1995 to 2003. First elected as a member of the Saskatchewan Liberal Party, she joined the new Saskatchewan Party caucus in 1997.

She was born in Saskatoon, Saskatchewan and was educated in Bruno. She worked on a mixed farm with her husband Robert and was a teacher associate for special needs children before entering politics. In the assembly, Julé was concerned with issues such as the prevention of child prostitution. She did not run for reelection in 2003.

Julé was acclaimed as the Saskatchewan Party candidate for Saskatoon Nutana for the 2007 election but withdrew after deciding to become program manager for a rural community-development project in Ghana.
