= James Chisholm King =

Canadian politician

James Chisholm King (July 11, 1886 – 1970) was a dentist and political figure in Saskatchewan. He represented Humboldt from 1935 to 1938 in the Legislative Assembly of Saskatchewan as a Liberal.

He was born in Winnipeg, Manitoba, the son of George King and Frances Annie Chisholm, and was educated there, in Dauphin and at Toronto University, where he received a DDS degree. King practised as a dentist in Winnipeg before moving to Humboldt, Saskatchewan in 1911. He served as mayor of Humboldt from 1920 to 1923 and in 1931. King was president of the Saskatchewan Council of Dental Surgeons and was also a Mason. He was first elected to the provincial assembly in a 1935 by-election held after the death of James Hogan.
