= Serge Kujawa =

Canadian politician and lawyer

MLA for Regina Albert South
- In office 1991–1995
- Preceded by: Jack Klein
- Succeeded by: Andrew Thomson

Personal details
- Born: November 25, 1924 Radin, Poland
- Died: September 22, 2014 (aged 89) Regina, Saskatchewan
- Party: Saskatchewan New Democratic Party
- Occupation: lawyer, prosecutor

Serge Kujawa (November 25, 1924 – September 22, 2014) was a Canadian politician and lawyer. He served in the Legislative Assembly of Saskatchewan from 1991 to 1995 as a New Democratic Party member for the constituency of Regina Albert South.

Kujawa was born in 1925 in Radin, Poland and came to Canada at the age of 3, in 1928. He attended the University of Saskatchewan where he earned a Bachelor of Arts (1957) and Bachelor of Laws (1958) degree. Kujawa became a prosecutor in the Saskatchewan Department of Justice. He oversaw the investigation of Saskatchewan politician Colin Thatcher after the murder of Thatcher's ex-wife in 1983; and then, in 1984, by successfully prosecuting Thatcher for first-degree murder.

Kujawa married Betty Brydges in 1954 and had six children. He died in 2014, aged 89.

== Electoral history ==
1991 Saskatchewan general election: Regina Albert South
Party	Candidate	Votes	%	±%
NDP	Serge Kujawa	4,333	46.43%	+8.59
Liberal	Saul Jacobson	3,133	33.57%	+16.39
Progressive Conservative	Jack Klein	1,761	18.86%	-26.12
Independent	John O'Donoghue	106	1.14%	–
Total		9,333	100.00%	
