= Mary John Batten =

Canadian politician

Assembly Member for Humboldt
- In office 1956–1964
- Preceded by: Joseph William Burton
- Succeeded by: Mathieu Breker

Personal details
- Born: Mary John Fodchuk; August 30, 1921 Sifton, Manitoba
- Died: October 9, 2015 (aged 94)
- Party: Saskatchewan Liberal Party
- Spouse: M. Charles R. Batten
- Children: Dick, Justine, Trish, and Jyll
- Education: University of Saskatchewan (Bachelor of Arts 1941; Bachelor of Law 1942)

Mary John Batten (née Fodchuk; August 30, 1921 – October 9, 2015) was a Canadian lawyer, judge and political figure in Saskatchewan. Batten represented Humboldt from 1956 to 1964 in the Legislative Assembly of Saskatchewan as a Liberal. She was the first woman of Ukrainian origin to be elected to a Canadian provincial parliament in

== Biography ==
Batten was born Mary John Fodchuk in 1921 in Sifton, Manitoba, and educated in Calder, Saskatchewan, Ituna and Regina to study at the University of Saskatchewan. She articled with Diefenbaker and Cuelenaere in Prince Albert to be called to the Saskatchewan bar in 1945, later moving to Humboldt. She married M. Charles R. Batten, also a lawyer, and joined Batten, Fodchuk, and Batten as a partner in Wadena and Humboldt in 1964. After leaving politics in 1964, Batten served as the chairperson between 1966 and 1968 firstly at the Prairie Provinces Cost Study Commission, then at the Public Accountancy Commission, to be named the Saskatchewan District Court or the Court of Queen's Bench for Saskatchewan in 1980.

On June 30, 1983, Batten was appointed the first female chief justice to hold that appointment until her retirement in 1990.

Batten died in October 2015 at the age of 94. Batten was survived by four children.
