= Racquel Hilbert =

Canadian politician

Racquel Hilbert MLA

Member of the Saskatchewan Legislative Assembly for Humboldt-Watrous
- Incumbent
- Assumed office October 28, 2024
- Preceded by: Donna Harpauer

Personal details
- Party: Saskatchewan Party
- Education: University of Saskatchewan
- Profession: Management Civil Engineering

Racquel Hilbert is a Canadian politician who was elected to the Legislative Assembly of Saskatchewan in the 2024 general election, representing Humboldt-Watrous as a member of the Saskatchewan Party.

== Early life ==
Before politics she worked as a teacher and the founder of a drilling company.

== Controversies ==
=== Racist remark ===
In April 2025, Hilbert apologized for falsely describing federal NDP Leader Jagmeet Singh as a 'terrorist' during a March 25 legislative debate. Hilbert later admitted the comment was inaccurate and inappropriate, withdrawing it amid public backlash and condemnation from the Saskatchewan NDP. Following her remarks, she was stripped of her legislative committee roles but remains in the Saskatchewan Party caucus. Despite public backlash and calls for her removal, Premier Scott Moe limited disciplinary action, while the legislature later passed a bill recognizing April as Sikh Heritage Month.
