= Watrous (former electoral district) =

Former provincial electoral district in Saskatchewan, Canada

Coordinates: 51°50′N 105°50′W

Watrous was a provincial electoral district for the Legislative Assembly of the province of Saskatchewan, Canada, in the area of Watrous, east of Saskatoon. Created as "Vonda" before the 2nd Saskatchewan general election in 1908, this constituency was redrawn and renamed "Watrous" in 1934.

This riding was abolished and absorbed into the Arm River district before the 18th Saskatchewan general election in 1975. Another provincial electoral district named "Watrous" existed from 1995 to 2003.

== Members of the Legislative Assembly ==
=== Vonda (1908–1934) ===
#	MLA	Served	Party
1.	Albert Frederick Totzke	1908–1917	Liberal
2.	James Hogan	1917–1934	Liberal

=== Watrous (1934–1975) ===
#	MLA	Served	Party
1.	Bert G. Clement	1934–1938	Liberal
2.	Frank S. Krenn	1938–1944	Liberal
3.	Jim Darling	1944–1960	CCF
4.	Hans Broten	1960–1967	CCF
5.	Percy Schmeiser	1967–1971	Liberal
6.	Don Cody	1971–1975	New Democrat

=== Watrous (1995–2003) ===
#	MLA	Served	Party
1.	Eric Upshall	1995 to 1999	Saskatchewan New Democratic Party
2.	Donna Harpauer	1999 to 2003	Saskatchewan Party

== Election results ==
=== Vonda (1908–1934) ===
1908 Saskatchewan general election: Vonda electoral district
Party	Candidate	Votes	%	±%
Liberal	Albert Frederick Totzke	442	47.17%	–
Independent	Frank Ralph Wright	321	34.26%	–
Provincial Rights	William Mackay	174	18.57%	–
Total		937	100.00%	

1912 Saskatchewan general election: Vonda electoral district
Party	Candidate	Votes	%	±%
Liberal	Albert Frederick Totzke	1,106	68.40%	+21.23
Conservative	Frank Ralph Wright	384	23.75%	+5.18
Independent	Gilbert A. Lerew	127	7.85%	-26.41
Total		1,617	100.00%	

1917 Saskatchewan general election: Vonda electoral district
Party	Candidate	Votes	%	±%
Liberal	James Hogan	2,651	74.30%	+5.90
Conservative	Duncan Malcolm McKeller	917	25.70%	+1.95
Total		3,568	100.00%	

1921 Saskatchewan general election: Vonda electoral district
Party	Candidate	Votes	%	±%
Liberal	James Hogan	2,672	78.08%	+3.78
Independent	John Hilliard Currie	750	21.92%	-
Total		3,422	100.00%	

1925 Saskatchewan general election: Vonda electoral district
Party	Candidate	Votes	%	±%
Liberal	James Hogan	2,181	65.08%	-13.00
Progressive	Frank Henry Kellerman	1,170	34.92%	–
Total		3,351	100.00%	

1929 Saskatchewan general election: Vonda electoral district
Party	Candidate	Votes	%	±%
Liberal	James Hogan	3,300	68.51%	+3.43
Independent	George McIntosh	1,517	31.49%	-
Total		4,817	100.00%	

=== Watrous (1934–1975) ===
1934 Saskatchewan general election: Watrous electoral district
Party	Candidate	Votes	%	±%
Liberal	Bert G. Clement	2,362	41.32%	-27.19
Farmer-Labour	Alexander Fraser Murray	1,829	32.00%	–
Conservative	Chester Cameron McClellan	1,525	26.68%	-
Total		5,716	100.00%	

1938 Saskatchewan general election: Watrous electoral district
Party	Candidate	Votes	%	±%
Liberal	Frank S. Krenn	3,522	45.23%	+3.91
CCF	John Waldbillig	2,181	28.01%	-3.99
Social Credit	Charles A. Schmeiser	1,609	20.67%	–
Conservative	Julius W. Stechishin	474	6.09%	-20.59
Total		7,786	100.00%	

1944 Saskatchewan general election: Watrous electoral district
Party	Candidate	Votes	%	±%
CCF	Jim Darling	3,801	55.39%	+27.38
Liberal	Frank S. Krenn	2,312	33.69%	-11.54
Prog. Conservative	Hugh Smith	749	10.92%	+4.83
Total		6,862	100.00%	

1948 Saskatchewan general election: Watrous electoral district
Party	Candidate	Votes	%	±%
CCF	Jim Darling	2,968	43.08%	-12.31
Liberal	Andrew W. Michayluk	2,829	41.07%	+7.38
Social Credit	Martin Kelln	1,092	15.85%	-
Total		6,889	100.00%	

1952 Saskatchewan general election: Watrous electoral district
Party	Candidate	Votes	%	±%
CCF	Jim Darling	3,292	53.46%	+10.38
Liberal	Alex W. Prociuk	2,381	38.66%	-2.41
Social Credit	H.J. Cochrane	485	7.88%	-7.97
Total		6,158	100.00%	

1956 Saskatchewan general election: Watrous electoral district
Party	Candidate	Votes	%	±%
CCF	Jim Darling	2,734	47.53%	-5.93
Liberal	J. Earl Storey	1,910	33.21%	-5.45
Social Credit	Donald E. Schwinghammer	1,108	19.26%	+11.38
Total		5,752	100.00%	

1960 Saskatchewan general election: Watrous electoral district
Party	Candidate	Votes	%	±%
CCF	Hans A. Broten	2,444	43.60%	-3.93
Liberal	M. Nathan Spector	2,035	36.30%	+3.09
Social Credit	Herbert H. Henschel	761	13.57%	-5.69
Prog. Conservative	Lauren Kolbinson	366	6.53%	-
Total		5,606	100.00%	

1964 Saskatchewan general election: Watrous electoral district
Party	Candidate	Votes	%	±%
CCF	Hans A. Broten	2,725	51.15%	+7.55
Liberal	Neil McArthur	2,602	48.85%	+12.55
Total		5,327	100.00%	

1967 Saskatchewan general election: Watrous electoral district
Party	Candidate	Votes	%	±%
Liberal	Percy A. Schmeiser	2,622	45.90%	-2.95
NDP	Hans A. Broten	2,557	44.77%	-6.38
Prog. Conservative	Hugh Kirk	533	9.33%	-
Total		5,712	100.00%	

1971 Saskatchewan general election: Watrous electoral district
Party	Candidate	Votes	%	±%
NDP	Don W. Cody	3,318	52.71%	+7.94
Liberal	Percy A. Schmeiser	2,552	40.54%	-5.36
Prog. Conservative	Jack B. Pearce	425	6.75%	-2.58
Total		6,295	100.00%	

== See also ==
- List of Saskatchewan provincial electoral districts
- List of Saskatchewan general elections
- Canadian provincial electoral districts
- Vonda, Saskatchewan
