= Jack Charles Klein =

Canadian politician (1935–2017)

Jack Charles Klein (July 13, 1935 – June 8, 2017) was a Canadian politician in Saskatchewan. He represented Regina North from 1982 to 1986 and Regina South from 1986 to 1991 in the Legislative Assembly of Saskatchewan as a Progressive Conservative.

== History ==
Klein was born in Weyburn, Saskatchewan on July 13, 1935, the son of Charles Klein and Josephine Kotowicz, and was educated in Regina. In 1956, he married Shirley Tokalski. In Regina, he operated many small businesses, including a restaurant, the Sunset Amusement Park, and LeisureWorld hobby stores. He was also a successful insurance broker and realtor before entering politics. Klein served in the Saskatchewan cabinet as Minister of Tourism and Small Business, as Minister of Urban Affairs, as Minister of Trade and Investment, as Minister of Consumer and Commercial Affairs and as Minister of Human Resources, Labour and Employment. He was defeated by Serge Kujawa when he ran for reelection to the assembly in the renamed riding of Regina Albert South.

Klein maintained friendships across political lines. In 2010, he delivered the eulogy at the funeral of retired Liberal Senator Davey Steuart, the former mayor of Prince Albert, Saskatchewan.

Klein died on June 8, 2017, at the age of 81.
