= Hans Broten =

Canadian politician

MLA for Watrous
- In office 1960–1967
- Preceded by: James Darling
- Succeeded by: Percy Schmeiser

Personal details
- Born: Hans Adolf Broten; August 12, 1916 Viscount, Saskatchewan, Canada
- Died: October 19, 1992 (aged 76) Saskatoon, Saskatchewan, Canada
- Resting place: Hillcrest Memorial Gardens; Saskatoon, Saskatchewan
- Party: CCF
- Spouse: Lovern Anita Nelson
- Relations: Cam Broten (grandson)
- Children: 5
- Education: University of Saskatchewan
- Occupation: Farmer

Hans Adolf Broten (August 12, 1916 – October 19, 1992) was a Canadian politician, who represented the electoral district of Watrous in the Legislative Assembly of Saskatchewan from 1960 to 1967. He was a member of the Cooperative Commonwealth Federation.

His grandson is Cam Broten, who later became leader of the Saskatchewan New Democratic Party.
