= Regina Dewdney =

Former provincial electoral district in Saskatchewan, Canada

Coordinates: 50°26′48″N 104°33′20″W

Saskatchewan electoral district
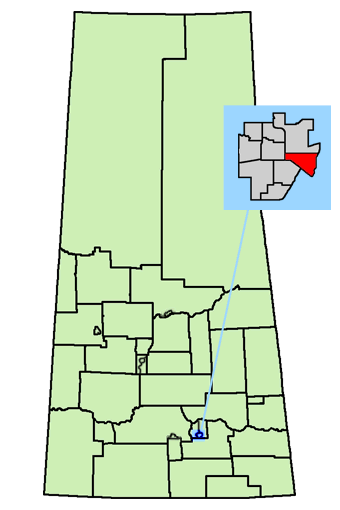

Defunct provincial electoral district
- Legislature: Legislative Assembly of Saskatchewan
- District created: 1991
- First contested: 1991
- Last contested: 2011

Demographics
- Population (2006): 17,248
- Electors: 10,546
- Census division(s): Division 6
- Census subdivision(s): Regina

Regina Dewdney was a provincial electoral district for the Legislative Assembly of Saskatchewan, Canada. This district included the neighbourhoods of Dewdney, Crescent Park, Glenelm Park, Glenelm Park South, Gardiner Park, Arcola East-North Side, Gardiner Heights, Wood Meadows, Glencairn and half of Glencairn Village.

== Members of the Legislative Assembly ==
Parliament	Years	Member	Party
22nd	1991–1995	Ed Tchorzewski	New Democrat
23rd	1995–1999	Ed Tchorzewski	New Democrat
23rd	1999	Kevin Yates	New Democrat
24th	1999–2003	Kevin Yates	New Democrat
25th	2003–2007	Kevin Yates	New Democrat
26th	2007–2011	Kevin Yates	New Democrat
27th	2011–2016	Gene Makowsky	Saskatchewan Party
District dissolved into Regina Gardiner Park

== Election results ==
2011 Saskatchewan general election
Party	Candidate	Votes	%	±%
Saskatchewan	Gene Makowsky	4,435	60.65	+21.03
NDP	Kevin Yates	2,558	34.98	-10.51
Liberal	Robin Schneider	176	2.41	-10.49
Green	Darcy Robillard	143	1.96	-0.03
Total		7,312	100.00	

2007 Saskatchewan general election
Party	Candidate	Votes	%	±%
NDP	Kevin Yates	3,821	45.49	-9.59
Saskatchewan	Don Saelhof	3,328	39.62	+11.13
Liberal	Shaine Peters	1,083	12.90	-2.55
Green	Darcy Robillard	167	1.99	+1.53
Total		8,399	100.00	

2003 Saskatchewan general election
Party	Candidate	Votes	%	±%
NDP	Kevin Yates	4,153	55.08	+7.96
Saskatchewan	Rob Bresciani	2,148	28.49	+9.36
Liberal	Simone Clayton	1,165	15.45	-10.86
Independent	Blaine Gilbertson	39	0.52	*
New Green	Darcy Robillard	35	0.46	-4.70
Total		7,540	100.00	

1999 Saskatchewan general election
Party	Candidate	Votes	%	±%
NDP	Kevin Yates	2,687	47.12	-0.64
Liberal	Hem Juttla	1,500	26.31	-4.23
Saskatchewan	Brent Shirkey	1,091	19.13	+7.29
New Green	Victor Lau	294	5.16	-4.70
Prog. Conservative	Kristian Eggum	130	2.28	-
Total		5,702	100.00	

June 28, 1999 By-Election
Party	Candidate	Votes	%	±%
NDP	Kevin Yates	1,614	47.76	-21.50
Liberal	Hem Juttla	1,032	30.54	+7.11
Saskatchewan	Randall Edge	400	11.84	*
New Green	Victor Lau	333	9.86	*
Total		3,379	100.00	

1995 Saskatchewan general election
Party	Candidate	Votes	%	±%
NDP	Ed Tchorzewski	4,037	69.26	-0.09
Liberal	John MacGowan	1,366	23.43	+3.03
Prog. Conservative	Barry Bonneau	426	7.31	-2.94
Total		5,829	100.00	

1991 Saskatchewan general election
Party	Candidate	Votes	%	±%
NDP	Ed Tchorzewski	6,695	69.35	*
Liberal	Bob Newman	1,969	20.40	*
Prog. Conservative	Warne Rhoades	990	10.25	*
Total		9,654	100.00	

== See also ==
- List of Saskatchewan provincial electoral districts
- List of Saskatchewan general elections
- Canadian provincial electoral districts
