= Humboldt-Watrous =

Provincial electoral district in Saskatchewan, Canada

Saskatchewan electoral district

Provincial electoral district
- Legislature: Legislative Assembly of Saskatchewan
MLA
Racquel Hilbert
Saskatchewan
- District created: 2013
- First contested: 2016
- Last contested: 2024

Demographics
- Census division(s): Division 11, Division 15
- Census subdivision(s): Humboldt, Watrous

Humboldt-Watrous is a provincial electoral district for the Legislative Assembly of Saskatchewan, Canada. It was created from parts of Humboldt and Arm River-Watrous and was first contested in the 2016 election.

== Members of the Legislative Assembly ==
This riding has elected the following members of the Legislative Assembly:

Legislature	Years	Member	Party
Humboldt-Watrous; Riding created from Humboldt and Arm River-Watrous
28th	2016–2020	Donna Harpauer	Saskatchewan
29th	2020–2024	Donna Harpauer	Saskatchewan
30th	2024–present	Racquel Hilbert	Saskatchewan

== Election results ==
2024 Saskatchewan general election
Party	Candidate	Votes	%	±%
Saskatchewan	Racquel Hilbert	5,271	58.66	-13.44
New Democratic	Kevin Fallis	2,230	24.82	+8.12
Progressive Conservative	Rose Buscholl	660	7.35	+4.25
Saskatchewan United	Carrie Ann Hradecki	600	6.68	–
Green	Sharon Thibault	127	1.41	-0.99
Buffalo	Megan Christianson	97	1.08	-4.92
Total valid votes		8,985	99.29	
Total rejected ballots		64	0.71	
Turnout		9,049	64.25	
Eligible voters		14,083		
Saskatchewan hold		Swing		
Source: Elections Saskatchewan

2020 provincial election redistributed results
Party	%
Saskatchewan	72.1
New Democratic	16.7
Buffalo	6.0
Green	2.4

2020 Saskatchewan general election
Party	Candidate	Votes	%	±%
Saskatchewan	Donna Harpauer	5,713	72.81	-1.73
New Democratic	Wendy Sekulich	1,180	15.04	-5.30
Buffalo	Constance Maffenbeier	529	6.74	–
Progressive Conservative	Rose Buscholl	243	3.10	–
Green	Jim Ternier	181	2.31	-0.08
Total valid votes		7,846	99.57	
Total rejected ballots		34	0.43	–
Turnout		7,880	–	–
Eligible voters		–		
Saskatchewan hold		Swing		–
Source: Elections Saskatchewan

2016 Saskatchewan general election
Party	Candidate	Votes	%	±%
Saskatchewan	Donna Harpauer	5,818	74.54	–
New Democratic	Adam Duke	1,588	20.34	–
Liberal	Robert Tutka	212	2.71	–
Green	Lori Harper	187	2.39	–
Total valid votes		7,805	100.0	
Eligible voters		–		
Saskatchewan pickup new district.				
Source: Elections Saskatchewan

== See also ==
- List of Saskatchewan provincial electoral districts
- List of Saskatchewan general elections
- Canadian provincial electoral districts
