= Regina South =

Former provincial electoral district in Saskatchewan, Canada

Coordinates: 50°24′27″N 104°37′05″W

Saskatchewan electoral district

Provincial electoral district
- Legislature: Legislative Assembly of Saskatchewan
- District created: 1964
- First contested: 1964
- Last contested: 2011

Demographics
- Electors: 11,760
- Census division: Division 6
- Census subdivision: Regina

Regina South was a provincial electoral district for the Legislative Assembly of Saskatchewan, Canada. Originally created for the 15th Saskatchewan general election in 1964, this constituency changed boundaries and names many times.

The district was called "Regina Whitmore Park" from 1971 to 1975, and "Regina Albert South" from 1991 to 1995. The riding was dissolved into Regina Pasqua and Regina University prior to the 2016 election. However, it was reconstituted as "Regina South Albert" for the 2024 election.

== Members of the Legislative Assembly ==
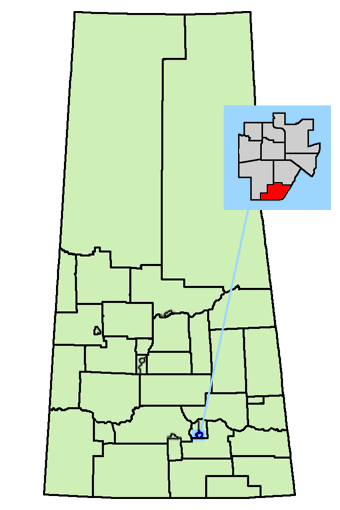
Regina South boundaries in its most recent iteration (2003–2016)

Parliament	Years	Member	Party
15th	1964–1967	Gordon Grant	Liberal
16th	1967–1971	Gordon Grant	Liberal
Regina Whitmore Park
17th	1971–1975	Gordon Grant	Liberal
Regina South
18th	1975–1978	Stuart Cameron	Liberal
19th	1978–1982	Paul Rousseau	Progressive Conservative
20th	1982–1986	Paul Rousseau	Progressive Conservative
21st	1986–1991	Jack Klein	Progressive Conservative
Regina Albert South
22nd	1991–1995	Serge Kujawa	New Democrat
Regina South
23rd	1995–1999	Andrew Thomson	New Democrat
24th	1999–2003	Andrew Thomson	New Democrat
25th	2003–2007	Andrew Thomson	New Democrat
26th	2007–2011	Bill Hutchinson	Saskatchewan Party
27th	2011–2016	Bill Hutchinson	Saskatchewan Party
District dissolved into Regina Pasqua and Regina University

== Election results ==
2011 Saskatchewan general election
Party	Candidate	Votes	%	±%
Saskatchewan	Bill Hutchinson	4,461	53.79%	+9.98
NDP	Yens Pedersen	3,534	42.61%	+1.40
Green	David Orban	299	3.60%	+0.99
Total		8,294	100.00%	

2007 Saskatchewan general election
Party	Candidate	Votes	%	±%
Saskatchewan	Bill Hutchinson	4,302	43.81%	+15.77
NDP	Yens Pedersen	4,047	41.21%	-8.25
Liberal	Mark Lloyd	1,215	12.37%	-8.80
Green	Ron McMahon	256	2.61%	+1.58
Total		9,820	100.00%	

2003 Saskatchewan general election
Party	Candidate	Votes	%	±%
New Democratic	Andrew Thomson	4,662	49.47%	+10.47
Saskatchewan	Jim Roberts	2,646	28.08%	−1.67
Liberal	S. Debbie Ward	1,994	21.16%	−6.87
New Green	Garry Ashworth Ewart	97	1.03%	−2.23
Western Independence	Shea Ritter	25	0.27%	–
Total		9,424	100.00%	

1999 Saskatchewan general election
Party	Candidate	Votes	%	±%
NDP	Andrew Thomson	3,324	38.99%	-9.12
Saskatchewan	Terri Harris	2,533	29.71%	–
Liberal	David Huliyappa	2,390	28.04%	-16.38
New Green	Peter Borch	278	3.26%	–
Total		8,525	100.00%	

1995 Saskatchewan general election
Party	Candidate	Votes	%	±%
NDP	Andrew Thomson	4,139	48.11%	+1.68
Liberal	Ross Keith	3,821	44.42%	+10.85
Prog. Conservative	John Weir	643	7.47%	-11.39
Total		8,603	100.00%	

1991 Saskatchewan general election: Regina Albert South
Party	Candidate	Votes	%	±%
NDP	Serge Kujawa	4,333	46.43%	+8.59
Liberal	Saul Jacobson	3,133	33.57%	+16.39
Prog. Conservative	Jack Klein	1,761	18.86%	-26.12
Independent	John O'Donoghue	106	1.14%	–
Total		9,333	100.00%	

1986 Saskatchewan general election
Party	Candidate	Votes	%	±%
Progressive Conservative	Jack Klein	4,115	44.98%	-20.89
NDP	Margaret Fern	3,462	37.84%	+6.80
Liberal	Kevin Moore	1,572	17.18%	+14.09
Total		9,149	100.00%	

1982 Saskatchewan general election
Party	Candidate	Votes	%	±%
Progressive Conservative	Paul Rousseau	6,088	65.87%	+24.96
NDP	Margaret Fern	2,869	31.04%	-7.28
Liberal	Lori Stinson	286	3.09%	-17.68
Total		9,243	100.00%	

1978 Saskatchewan general election
Party	Candidate	Votes	%	±%
Progressive Conservative	Paul Rousseau	3,325	40.91%	+14.41
NDP	John Hettema	3,114	38.32%	+13.69
Liberal	Philip M. Desjardine	1,688	20.77%	-28.10
Total		8,127	100.00%	

1975 Saskatchewan general election
Party	Candidate	Votes	%	±%
Liberal	Stuart Cameron	3,796	48.87%	-16.98
Prog. Conservative	Paul Rousseau	2,059	26.50%	-
NDP	Eric H. Cline	1,913	24.63%	-9.52
Total		7,768	100.00%	

1971 Saskatchewan general election: Regina Whitmore Park
Party	Candidate	Votes	%	±%
Liberal	Gordon Grant	3,777	65.85%	-1.43
NDP	Art Lloyd	1,959	34.15%	+6.64
Total		5,736	100.00%	

1967 Saskatchewan general election
Party	Candidate	Votes	%	±%
Liberal	Gordon Grant	6,297	67.28%	-2.08
NDP	Jack W. Kehoe	2,575	27.51%	-3.13
Prog. Conservative	Lillian Groeller	487	5.21%	–
Total		9,359	100.00%	

1964 Saskatchewan general election
Party	Candidate	Votes	%	±%
Liberal	Gordon Grant	7,788	69.36%	–
CCF	George R. Bothwell	3,440	30.64%	–
Total		11,228	100.00%	

== See also ==
- List of Saskatchewan provincial electoral districts
- List of Saskatchewan general elections
- Canadian provincial electoral districts
- South Regina — North-West Territories territorial electoral district (1870–1905)
