= Ben Putnam =

Canadian politician and farmer

Ben Putnam (January 15, 1886 – 1956) was an American-born farmer and political figure in Saskatchewan. He represented Humboldt from 1944 to 1948 in the Legislative Assembly of Saskatchewan as a Co-operative Commonwealth Federation (CCF) member.

He was born in Laurel, Iowa, the son of George Putnam and Emma Lukehart, was educated at the Iowa State College of Agriculture and came to Canada in 1911. In the same year, he married Grace Ward. Putnam lived in Watson, Saskatchewan. He was defeated by Arnold William Loehr when he ran for reelection to the provincial assembly in 1948.

Putnam was editor of Fifty years of progress : chiefly the story of the pioneers of the Watson district from 1900-1910, published in 1950.
