= Percy Schmeiser =

Canadian farmer, businessman, and politician (1931–2020)

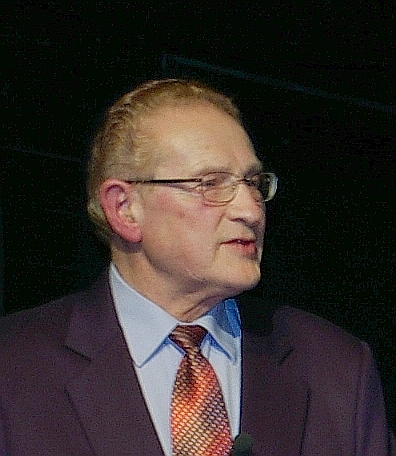
- Percy Schmeiser in Stuttgart (2008);

MLA for Watrous
- In office 1967–1971
- Preceded by: Hans Broten
- Succeeded by: Donald Cody

Personal details
- Born: January 5, 1931 Bruno, Saskatchewan, Canada
- Died: October 13, 2020 (aged 89)
- Party: Saskatchewan Liberal Party
- Occupation: Farmer
- Awards: Right Livelihood Award

Percy Schmeiser (1931–2020) was a Canadian businessman, farmer, and politician who ran a family farm operation in Saskatchewan for decades and later served in municipal and provincial politics. He gained international recognition for his landmark legal battle against the multinational agrichemical company Monsanto. He became a prominent advocate and symbol for independent farmers' rights and the regulation of transgenic crops, and was the subject of numerous films and documentaries, including Percy (2020).

== Background ==
Percy Schmeiser was born on January 5, 1932 into a family of farmers in Bruno, Saskatchewan. Growing up, Schmeiser assisted with his family’s farming operations as well as their various other businesses. As a young adult, Schmeiser attended the Radio College of Canada in Toronto where he earned a diploma in radio and television technology.

Thereafter, Schmeiser returned to Saskatchewan, and in 1954, took over the operations of the family-owned farm, gas station, and farm equipment dealership. He renamed the farm equipment dealership Schmeiser's Garage and in 1986, opened a second dealership location in Humboldt, Saskatchewan (Central Farm Sales). He remained involved in business operations until the dealership was sold in 2003.

Schmeiser began his political career at the municipal level in Bruno, serving as a town councillor in 1961 before being elected mayor in 1963. From 1967 to 1971, Schmeiser served in the Legislative Assembly of Saskatchewan, representing the electoral district of Watrous as a member of the Saskatchewan Liberal Party. During this time, Schmeiser was on the MLA committee that selected Saskatchewan's flag.

While farming, Schmeiser specialized in breeding and growing canola, field peas, mustard, and wheat.

== Monsanto v. Schmeiser ==
In 1997, Schmeiser, who was routinely known for saving and cross-breeding his seeds, found out that his neighbors that year were using Roundup-Ready (RR) crops. To clear stray volunteer canola plants near the road and around utility poles nearby, he sprayed Roundup throughout the area. Finding that some of it was stray plants from his neighbors, he sprayed a three-acre unused overgrown field nearby to find more RR crops and collected their seed.

Monsanto inspectors tested plants along the road as a part of their contract with Schmeiser's neighbors and warned him about not using any of the seed. Early in 1998, Schmeiser had the saved RR seed cleaned at a local facility and sowed it across 1,030 acres of his fields. The inspectors retested his fields and the cleaning facility that year, finding a high concentration of RR crops. Monsanto subsequently contacted Schmeiser demanding payment of a “technology use fee” for not having paid for a planting license for the crops. Eventually, Monsanto commenced legal proceedings against Schmeiser for infringement of their intellectual property rights.

The case worked its way through the Canadian court system over the following years. Monsanto initially sought $15 per acre across 1,030 acres, totaling $15,450, plus costs, on the grounds that Schmeiser possessed their patented technology without authorization. Schmeiser claimed that he never benefitted from the seeds, as he hadn't used Roundup on them after sowing. Monsanto argued this was irrelevant, as mere possession of the technology by Schmeiser was sufficient to ground their claim. In effect, Monsanto’s position was that they held a valid patent and intended to enforce it.

During this period, Schmeiser became a prominent voice in the movement against genetic engineering, accepting speaking invitations around the world. He also continued to face pressure and harassment from Monsanto trying to enforce their patent rights.

The case ultimately reached the Supreme Court of Canada. In a split decision, Schmeiser prevailed on financial grounds, as the court ruled unanimously (9-0) that he owed Monsanto no technology-use fee, damages, or costs on the basis that he had derived no benefit from their patented trait. However, in a 5-4 ruling on the underlying patent question, the court held that Monsanto’s patent was valid and that unintentional possession of the patented gene still constituted infringement. An independent analysis that had been ordered by the court found that over 95% of Schmeiser's fields in 1998 had been RR crops. The judicial decision stated that Schmeiser's arguments could not "reasonably explain the concentration or extent of Roundup Ready canola of a commercial quality evident" as having come from wind, insects, passing cars, or other sources related to his neighbor's farms like he had claimed.

A film dramatizing Schmeiser’s legal battle and starring Christopher Walken was released just days before Schmeiser’s death on October 13, 2020.

== Schmeiser v. Monsanto ==
On August 11, 1999, Schmeiser filed a separate lawsuit against Monsanto for ten million dollars for "libel, trespass, and contamination of his fields with Roundup Ready Canola". As of 2007, Schmeiser had not started to prosecute that lawsuit.

In 2002, Schmeiser's wife, Louise Schmeiser, filed suit against Monsanto for $140 plus costs in small claims court to remove contamination of her organic garden with volunteer genetically-modified canola; the case was dismissed after the judge noted that they had presented no evidence that the canola was RR crops in the first place.

Schmeiser again discovered Roundup Ready Canola growing in his fields in 2005, even though canola had not been planted in that particular field since 1998. He contacted Monsanto to have the company remove it, but when Monsanto conditioned doing so on Schmeiser signing a confidentiality agreement and a release from litigation, Schmeiser had the cleanup done himself, billing Monsanto for the $660 cost. When Monsanto refused to pay, Schmeiser sued in small claims court. On March 19, 2008, Monsanto settled out of court, paying the $660 without stipulation.

== Awards ==
Schmeiser was the recipient of the Merit Award for Dealer of the Year in 1984 by the Saskatchewan Manitoba Implement Dealers Association. In 2000, he received the Mahatma Gandhi Award for working for the good of society. He is also a recipient of the Canadian Health Food Association Hall of Fame Award. In 2007, Percy Schmeiser and Louise Schmeiser were named winners of the Right Livelihood Award.

== Death ==
Schmeiser died on October 13, 2020, at the age of 89 from Parkinson's disease.

== In film ==
- The Future of Food – 2004
- GMO Monsanto vs Percy Schmeiser – 2005
- Percy Schmeiser : David versus Monsanto – 2009
- Seeds of Death: Unveiling the Lies of GMOs – 2012
- Seeds of Freedom – 2012
- Percy – 2020
