= Bill Hutchinson (politician) =

Canadian politician

The Honourable Bill Hutchinson ECS

Member of the Saskatchewan Legislative Assembly for Regina South
- In office November 7, 2007 – March 8, 2016
- Preceded by: Andrew Thomson
- Succeeded by: Riding abolished

Personal details
- Party: Saskatchewan Party
- Occupation: Architect

Bill Hutchinson is a Canadian politician. He represented the constituency of Regina South in the Legislative Assembly of Saskatchewan, as a member of the Saskatchewan Party.

== Cabinet positions ==
Saskatchewan provincial government of Brad Wall
Cabinet posts (3)
Predecessor	Office	Successor
Kevin Yates	Minister of Municipal Affairs; November 21, 2007–May 29, 2009	Jeremy Harrison
June Draude	Minister of First Nations & Metis Relations; Minister of Northern Affairs; May 29, 2009–June 29, 2010	Ken Cheveldayoff
Dustin Duncan	Minister of Tourism, Parks, Culture & Sport; June 29, 2010–May 25, 2012	Kevin Doherty
