= Kevin Yates (artist) =

Canadian visual artist

Kevin Yates (born in 1974) is a Canadian visual artist.

== Biography ==
Yates was born in Owen Sound, Ontario in 1974. He attended Ontario College of Art and Design in 1995, as well as Nova Scotia College of Art and Design in 1998, before completing his MFA at University of Victoria in 2001. His work has been exhibited at the Art Gallery of Nova Scotia, Halifax; Free Gallery, Glasgow, Scotland; Art Gallery of Ontario, Toronto; Musée d’art Contemporain, Montréal; Art Gallery of Alberta, Edmonton; National Gallery of Canada, Ottawa; Artspeak, Vancouver; Optica, Montréal; and Ditch Projects, Springfield, Oregon, among other venues. Yates' artworks appear in collections at institution including the Art Gallery of Ontario; Musée d’art contemporain de Montréal; National Gallery of Canada; Oakville Galleries.

== Art Practice ==
Working with sculpture and video, Yates’ ed work typically evokes a moment frozen in time, usually a tense moment of discovery and realization, encouraging the viewer to interact. Yates is known for his highly realistic miniatures that are experienced as physical objects; but because of their inaccessible scale, they can also be read as images. According to curator Marcie Bronson, Kevin Yates’s works are "at once familiar and strangely unsettling. [They] possess a quiet, meditative quality, often likened to the pause of a film still." Yates often finds inspiration in crime scenes and natural disasters. As Gary Michael Dault writes in the Globe and Mail, "[Yates'] models scintillate with and are redeemed by a disturbingly lyrical sense of loss, both self and community. Referencing both the outwash of natural disasters, the vagaries of climate change, and our relentless human tendency to move on, Yates's engulfed communities speak to impermanence - to the mystery of change."

== Additional sources ==
- Brown, Lorna. Kevin Yates: small dead woman. Vancouver: Artspeak, 2002;
- Charron, Marie-Ève. Présences magiques. Le Devoir, 25 September 2010;
- Christie, Claire. Remaking the Real. Toronto: Susan Hobbs Gallery, 2007;
- Dault, Gary Michael. The art of small-scale violence. The Globe and Mail, 13 July 2002;
- Dault, Julia. A small study in American apology. The National Post, 6 January 2005;
- Ghaznavi, Corinna. Kevin Yates: Susan Hobbs Gallery. Espace Sculpture, no.72, Summer 2005;
- Reid, Stuart; and Diviney, David. My ex-girlfriend is a slut. Oshawa/Owen Sound: Robert McLaughlin Gallery/Tom Thomson Memorial Art Gallery, 2004;
- Heather, Rosemary. Kevin Yates at Susan Hobbs, Toronto. Flash Art, vol.43, no.270(January/February 2010), p. 102;
- Jones, Susan. Gallery scraps old ideas. St. Albert Gazette, 22 September 2007;
- Jordan, Betty Ann. Kevin Yates. Toronto Life, January 2005;
- Jurakic, Ivan. Tales to Astonish. Cambridge: Cambridge Galleries, 2010;
- Lepage, Jocelyne. La hantise : La mort, encore! La Presse, 13 September 2010;
- Lovejoy, Bess Gabrielle. The Nature of Serial Killers. The Stranger, 6–12 June 2002;
- Regan, Kate. Kevin Yates. Toronto Life, September 2006;
- van der Avoird, Renée. Renée van der Avoird on Kevin Yates. FrameWork 5/12, 5 May 2012;
- Vaughan, RM. The Big Picture. The National Post, 15 January 2005.
