= Paul Emile Rousseau =

Canadian politician

Paul Emile Lucien Rousseau (December 20, 1929 – October 8, 2001) was a car dealer and political figure in Saskatchewan, Canada. He represented Regina South from 1978 to 1986 in the Legislative Assembly of Saskatchewan as a Progressive Conservative member.

== Biography ==
He was born in Fort Frances, Ontario, the son of Lucien Rousseau and Laura Comeau, and was educated there. In 1952, he married Janine Ducharme. Rousseau was employed at a car dealership in Fort Frances until 1958, when he moved to Melville, Saskatchewan. He operated Melville Motors there until 1960. He then moved to Regina where he operated car dealerships from 1960 to 1977. Rousseau ran unsuccessfully for a seat in the Saskatchewan assembly in 1975 before being elected in 1978. He ran unsuccessfully for the leadership of the Saskatchewan Progressive Conservative Party in 1979. Rousseau served in the provincial cabinet as Minister of Industry and Commerce, as Minister of Economic Development and Trade and as Minister of Revenue and Financial Services. He resigned his seat in the assembly in 1986. Later that year, he was named agent-general for Saskatchewan in London, England, serving until 1991 when he returned to Regina. He later died of lung cancer at the age of 71 in Regina at the Pasqua Hospital's Palliative Care Unit.
