= Regina Northeast =

Provincial electoral district in Saskatchewan, Canada

Coordinates: 50°28′28″N 104°34′45″W

Saskatchewan electoral district

Provincial electoral district
- Legislature: Legislative Assembly of Saskatchewan
MLA
Jacqueline Roy
New Democratic
- District created: 1967
- First contested: 1967
- Last contested: 2024

Demographics
- Electors: 10,657
- Census division: Division No. 6
- Census subdivision: Regina

Regina Northeast is a provincial electoral district for the Legislative Assembly of Saskatchewan, Canada. This district includes the neighbourhoods of Parkridge, Uplands, Glencairn, and Glencairn Village. The district was created in 1967 out of parts of Regina North and Regina East.

The riding was redistributed prior to the 1991 election into Regina Dewdney, Regina Wascana Plains, and Regina Churchill Downs. It was recreated before the 1995 election, from parts of Regina Albert North, Regina Churchill Downs, Regina Dewdney, Regina Lake Centre, Regina Victoria, and Qu'Appelle-Lumsden.

Kevin Doherty of the Saskatchewan Party won the riding in the general elections of 2011 and 2016, but announced his retirement from politics in the spring of 2018 and resigned the seat. A by-election was held on September 12, 2018, and was won by Yens Pedersen of the New Democratic Party. Gary Grewal was the candidate for the Saskatchewan Party. Grewal defeated Pedersen at the 2020 general election.

== Members of the Legislative Assembly ==
| Legislature | Years | Member | Party |
|---|---|---|---|
Regina North East
| 16th | 1967–1971 | Walt Smishek | New Democrat |
| 17th | 1971–1975 | Walt Smishek | New Democrat |
| 18th | 1975–1978 | Walt Smishek | New Democrat |
| 19th | 1978–1982 | Walt Smishek | New Democrat |
| 20th | 1982–1985 | Russell Sutor | Progressive Conservative |
| 20th | 1986 | Edwin Tchorzewski | New Democrat |
| 21st | 1986–1991 | Edwin Tchorzewski | New Democrat |
Regina Northeast
| 23rd | 1995–1999 | Edward Shillington | New Democrat |
| 24th | 1999–2003 | Ron Harper | New Democrat |
| 25th | 2003–2007 | Ron Harper | New Democrat |
| 26th | 2007–2011 | Ron Harper | New Democrat |
| 27th | 2011–2016 | Kevin Doherty | Saskatchewan Party |
| 28th | 2016–2018 | Kevin Doherty | Saskatchewan Party |
| 28th | 2018–2020 | Yens Pedersen | New Democrat |
| 29th | 2020–2024 | Gary Grewal | Saskatchewan Party |
| 30th | 2024–present | Jacqueline Roy | New Democrat |

== Election results ==
=== 1995–present ===
2024 Saskatchewan general election
| Party | Candidate | Votes | % | ±% |
|---|---|---|---|---|
| New Democratic | Jacqueline Roy | 3,660 | 50.73 | +8.43 |
| Saskatchewan | Rahul Singh | 3,153 | 43.70 | -7.90 |
| Progress | Kate Tremblay | 253 | 3.51 | +2.41 |
| Green | Anthony Thomas Majore | 149 | 2.07 | -0.13 |
| Total valid votes | | 7,215 | 99.13 | |
| Total rejected ballots | | 63 | 0.87 | +0.43 |
| Turnout | | 7,278 | 59.14 | +0.62 |
| Eligible voters | | 12,307 | | |
Source: Elections Saskatchewan
| New Democratic gain | | Swing | | |

2020 provincial election redistributed results
| Party | % |
|---|---|
| Saskatchewan | 51.6 |
| New Democratic | 42.3 |
| Green | 2.2 |
| Liberal | 1.1 |
| Others | 2.8 |

2020 Saskatchewan general election
| Party | Candidate | Votes | % | ±% |
|---|---|---|---|---|
| Saskatchewan | Gary Grewal | 3,709 | 49.60 | +10.39 |
| New Democratic | Yens Pedersen | 3,259 | 43.58 | -10.36 |
| Progressive Conservative | Corie Rempel | 272 | 3.64 | +0.78 |
| Green | Anthony Majore | 135 | 1.80 | -0.13 |
| Liberal | Jeff Walters | 103 | 1.38 | +0.07 |
| Total valid votes | | 7,478 | 99.56 | |
| Total rejected ballots | | 33 | 0.44 | +0.18 |
| Turnout | | 7,511 | 58.52 | +18.63 |
| Eligible voters | | 12,836 | | |
| Saskatchewan gain from New Democratic | | Swing | | – |
Source: Elections Saskatchewan

Saskatchewan provincial by-election, September 12, 2018
| Party | Candidate | Votes | % | ±% |
|---|---|---|---|---|
| New Democratic | Yens Pedersen | 2,676 | 53.94 | +13.34 |
| Saskatchewan | Gary Grewal | 1,945 | 39.21 | -15.44 |
| Progressive Conservative | Ken Grey | 142 | 2.86 | - |
| Green | Jessica Schroeder | 96 | 1.93 | -0.23 |
| Liberal | Reid Hill | 65 | 1.31 | -1.28 |
| Western Independence | Mark W. Regel | 37 | 0.75 | * |
| Total valid votes | | 4,961 | 99.74 | |
| Total rejected ballots | | 13 | 0.26 | -0.06 |
| Turnout | | 4,974 | 39.89 | -17.91 |
| Eligible voters | | 12,468 | | |
| New Democratic gain from Saskatchewan | | Swing | | +14.39 |

2016 Saskatchewan general election
| Party | Candidate | Votes | % | ±% |
|---|---|---|---|---|
| Saskatchewan | Kevin Doherty | 3,920 | 54.65 | -4.26 |
| New Democratic | Kathleen O'Reilly | 2,912 | 40.60 | +1.90 |
| Liberal | Hafeez Chaudhuri | 186 | 2.59 | - |
| Green | Marlene Macfarlane | 155 | 2.16 | -0.24 |
| Total valid votes | | 7,173 | 99.68 | |
| Total rejected ballots | | 23 | 0.32 | – |
| Turnout | | 7,196 | 57.81 | – |
| Eligible voters | | 12,448 | | |
| Saskatchewan hold | | Swing | | – |
Source: Elections Saskatchewan

2011 Saskatchewan general election
| Party | Candidate | Votes | % | ±% |
|---|---|---|---|---|
| Saskatchewan | Kevin Doherty | 4,054 | 58.91 | +18.46 |
| NDP | Dwayne Yasinowski | 2,663 | 38.70 | -10.14 |
| Green | Nathan Sgrazzutti | 165 | 2.40 | +0.43 |
| Total valid votes | | 6,882 | 99.83 | |
| Total rejected ballots | | 12 | 0.17 | – |
| Turnout | | 6,894 | 64.69 | – |
| Eligible voters | | 10,657 | | |
| Saskatchewan gain from New Democratic | | Swing | | – |
Source: Elections Saskatchewan

2007 Saskatchewan general election
| Party | Candidate | Votes | % | ±% |
|---|---|---|---|---|
| NDP | Ron Harper | 3,995 | 48.83 | -12.47 |
| Saskatchewan | Morris Elfenbaum | 3,308 | 40.44 | +17.78 |
| Liberal | Bryan Bell | 717 | 8.76 | -5.55 |
| Green | Hal Swartz | 161 | 1.97 | +1.11 |
| Total | | 8,181 | 100.00 | |

2003 Saskatchewan general election
| Party | Candidate | Votes | % | ±% |
|---|---|---|---|---|
| NDP | Ron Harper | 4,428 | 61.30 | +8.83 |
| Saskatchewan | Dwayne Walter | 1,637 | 22.66 | -3.07 |
| Liberal | Dennis Haydamacka | 1,034 | 14.31 | -7.49 |
| Prog. Conservative | George Marcotte | 63 | 0.87 | - |
| New Green | Susan Ferren | 62 | 0.86 | * |
| Total | | 7,224 | 100.00 | |

1999 Saskatchewan general election
| Party | Candidate | Votes | % | ±% |
|---|---|---|---|---|
| NDP | Ron Harper | 3,193 | 52.47 | -11.76 |
| Saskatchewan | Yvonne Mackie | 1,566 | 25.73 | * |
| Liberal | John W. Patterson | 1,327 | 21.80 | -7.76 |
| Total | | 6,086 | 100.00 | |

1995 Saskatchewan general election
| Party | Candidate | Votes | % | ±% |
|---|---|---|---|---|
| NDP | Edward Shillington | 4,303 | 64.23 | -5.71 |
| Liberal | Lorne Bultitude | 1,980 | 29.56 | +7.14 |
| Prog. Conservative | Douglas Berlin | 416 | 6.21 | -1.43 |
| Total | | 6,699 | 100.00 | |

=== 1967—1986 ===
1986 Saskatchewan general election
| Party | Candidate | Votes | % | ±% |
|---|---|---|---|---|
| NDP | Edwin Tchorzewski | 6,845 | 64.03 | -6.94 |
| Prog. Conservative | Noel Klock | 2,962 | 27.70 | +4.36 |
| Liberal | Paul Thériault | 884 | 8.27 | +2.58 |
| Total | | 10,691 | 100.00 | |

November 25, 1985 By-Election: Regina North East
| Party | Candidate | Votes | % | ±% |
|---|---|---|---|---|
| NDP | Edwin Tchorzewski | 5,377 | 70.97 | +32.46 |
| Prog. Conservative | Wilma Staff | 1,768 | 23.34 | -34.05 |
| Liberal | Harvey Schick | 431 | 5.69 | +3.76 |
| Total | | 7,576 | 100.00 | |

1982 Saskatchewan general election
| Party | Candidate | Votes | % | ±% |
|---|---|---|---|---|
| Prog. Conservative | Russell Sutor | 5,303 | 57.39 | +29.01 |
| NDP | Walt Smishek | 3,559 | 38.51 | -22.49 |
| Western Canada Concept | Ron J. Blashill | 201 | 2.17 | * |
| Liberal | Robert G.H. Dall'Olio | 178 | 1.93 | -8.23 |
| Total | | 9,241 | 100.00 | |

1978 Saskatchewan general election
| Party | Candidate | Votes | % | ±% |
|---|---|---|---|---|
| NDP | Walt Smishek | 4,831 | 61.00 | +7.68 |
| Prog. Conservative | Warren Denzin | 2,248 | 28.38 | +6.47 |
| Liberal | Del Miller | 805 | 10.16 | -14.61 |
| Independent | Roger D. Annis | 36 | 0.46 | * |
| Total | | 7,920 | 100.00 | |

1975 Saskatchewan general election
| Party | Candidate | Votes | % | ±% |
|---|---|---|---|---|
| NDP | Walt Smishek | 3,735 | 53.32 | -14.55 |
| Liberal | Del Miller | 1,735 | 24.77 | -7.36 |
| Prog. Conservative | Christine Howard | 1,535 | 21.91 | - |
| Total | | 7,005 | 100.00 | |

1971 Saskatchewan general election
| Party | Candidate | Votes | % | ±% |
|---|---|---|---|---|
| NDP | Walt Smishek | 8,760 | 67.87 | +11.54 |
| Liberal | James W. Gardiner | 4,147 | 32.13 | +0.19 |
| Total | | 12,907 | 100.00 | |

1967 Saskatchewan general election
| Party | Candidate | Votes | % | ±% |
|---|---|---|---|---|
| NDP | Walt Smishek | 5,892 | 56.33 | * |
| Liberal | Frank Gerein | 3,344 | 31.97 | * |
| Prog. Conservative | Albert E. Wilson | 1,224 | 11.70 | * |
| Total | | 10,460 | 100.00 | |

== See also ==
- List of Saskatchewan provincial electoral districts
- List of Saskatchewan general elections
- Canadian provincial electoral districts
