= Albert Frederick Totzke =

Canadian politician and pharmacist (1882–1951)

Albert Frederick Totzke (December 20, 1882 – October 17, 1951) was a pharmacist and political figure in Saskatchewan, Canada. He represented Vonda in the Legislative Assembly of Saskatchewan from 1908 to 1917 and Humboldt in the House of Commons of Canada from 1925 to 1935 as a Liberal.

He was born in Berlin, Ontario (now Kitchener, Ontario), the son of Carl Totzke, and was educated there, at the Ontario School of Pharmacy and the University of Toronto. In 1907, Totzke married Evelyn Lynch.
