= Kevin Doherty (politician) =

Canadian politician

The Honourable Kevin Doherty ECS

Member of the Saskatchewan Legislative Assembly for Regina Northeast
- In office November 7, 2011 – March 2, 2018
- Preceded by: Ron Harper
- Succeeded by: Yens Pedersen

Personal details
- Born: Rose Valley, Saskatchewan
- Party: Saskatchewan Party

Kevin Doherty is a Canadian politician, who was elected to the Legislative Assembly of Saskatchewan in the 2011 election. He represented the electoral district of Regina Northeast as a member of the Saskatchewan Party caucus.

On May 21, 2015, Doherty was appointed to the Executive Council of Saskatchewan as Minister of Finance.

He became Minister of Advanced Education August 30, 2017 but resigned exactly two months later to deal with personal issues. He subsequently resigned his seat in the legislature on March 2, 2018, to accept a position in the private sector.

== Cabinet positions ==
Saskatchewan provincial government of Brad Wall
Cabinet posts (4)
Predecessor	Office	Successor
Bronwyn Eyre	Minister of Advanced Education; August 30, 2017–October 30, 2017	Herb Cox
Ken Krawetz	Minister of Finance; May 21, 2015–August 30, 2017	Donna Harpauer
Rob Norris	Minister of Advanced Education; June 5, 2014–May 21, 2015	Scott Moe
Bill Hutchinson	Minister of Parks, Culture and Sport; May 25, 2012–June 5, 2014	Mark Docherty
