= David Bradley Neely =

Canadian politician

David Bradley Neely (18 December 1873 – 4 May 1925) was a physician and political figure in Saskatchewan, Canada. He represented Humboldt in the Legislative Assembly of Saskatchewan from 1905 to 1908 and Humboldt in the House of Commons of Canada from 1908 to 1917 as a Liberal.

He was born in Harkaway, Ontario, the son of Thomas Neely, and was educated in Owen Sound and at the University of Toronto. Neely practised medicine in Colborne and Markdale, before coming to Humboldt in 1904. In 1906, he married Laura Amelia Hill. He was reelected to the Saskatchewan assembly in 1908 but resigned his seat later than year to run for a seat in the House of Commons. Neely died in Saint Petersburg, Florida at the age of 51.
