= Normanview West, Regina =

Normanview West is a primarily residential neighbourhood in the west end of Regina, Saskatchewan. It is bordered by 9th avenue to the north, the rail line to the west, and McCarthy road to the east.

Developed in the 1970s, the neighbourhood includes a well-known bike path that borders Wascana Creek, as well Ruth M. Buck Park, which features a community operated tree nursery. It is also home to Normanview Mall.

According to the federal census in 2011, the neighbourhood's population is 2,940.
