= Louis Domotor =

Canadian politician

Louis Albert Domotor (born March 11, 1943) is a farmer and former political figure in Saskatchewan, Canada. He represented Humboldt from 1982 to 1986 in the Legislative Assembly of Saskatchewan as a Progressive Conservative.

He was born in Cudworth, Saskatchewan, the son of Frank Domotor. In 1965, he married Ann Sharon Christiaens. Domotor served in the Saskatchewan cabinet as Minister of Rural Development. He was defeated by Eric Upshall when he ran for reelection to the provincial assembly in 1986.
