= Arnold William Loehr =

Canadian politician

Arnold William Loehr (March 26, 1886 – September 30, 1963) was a farmer and politician in Saskatchewan. He represented Humboldt from 1948 to 1952 in the Legislative Assembly of Saskatchewan as a Liberal.

He was born in Spring Hill, Minnesota, the son of John Loehr and Katherine Spanier. His grandfather Johann and family were pioneers in the Fond du Lac, Wisconsin, area as early as 1841 before also later becoming some of the earliest settlers in Stearns County, Minnesota, in the early 1850s. His father, John, was born in St. Joseph, Minnesota, in 1855.

The Loehr family filed a homestead in Canada in 1904 in the new settlement of St. Peter's Colony. The community would later be incorporated as the village of Muenster, Saskatchewan in 1908. In 1909, Arnold married Agnes Heinen. He served as reeve for the rural municipality of Humboldt from 1931 to 1939 and as a member of the local school board from 1917 to 1942. Loehr was elected as a Member of the Legislative Assembly (MLA) in the Eleventh Legislature from June 24, 1948, to May 7, 1952. He was defeated by CCF candidate Joseph William Burton when he ran for reelection in 1952.
