= James Hogan (Saskatchewan politician) =

Canadian politician

James Hogan (1872 – January 8, 1935) was an American-born farmer and political figure in Saskatchewan. He represented Vonda from 1917 to 1934 and Humboldt from 1934 to 1935 in the Legislative Assembly of Saskatchewan as a Liberal.

The son of Edward Hogan and Helen Morton, he was born in Decorah, Iowa on November 27, 1872 and came to Canada in 1906, settling near Meacham, Saskatchewan. He became a citizen of Canada in 1910. On June 26, 1893, in Decorah, Iowa, he married Nellie (Ellen) Walsh, daughter of James Walsh and Ellen Dwyer. Hogan served 12 years as reeve of the rural municipality of Bayne. He was also a director of the Saskatchewan Co-operative Elevator Company. Hogan died in office of cancer in a Saskatoon hospital at the age of 62.
