= Norman Lang (politician) =

Canadian politician (1879–1930)

Norman Lang (August 4, 1879 – July 25, 1930) was a farmer, rancher and political figure in Saskatchewan, Canada. He represented Humboldt from 1917 to 1921 as a Unionist Party member.

He was born in Exeter, Ontario, the son of Robert Lang and Elizabeth Wells, and was educated in Manitoba. Lang served in the Second Boer War. His family farmed near Oak Lake, Manitoba until the death of his father. In 1885, they travelled west to Saskatoon. The following year, Lang and his family settled at Allan, Saskatchewan. He served 7 years as a member of the town council for Allan. Lang commanded a battalion in the Canadian Expeditionary Force that served in France and Belgium during World War I. In 1920, he married Jean MacDonald. In 1924, he began operating a silver fox farm. He was defeated by Charles Wallace Stewart when he ran for reelection in 1921. Lang died at the age of 50 after suffering a stroke while working in a field on his farm.
