= Glenelm Park, Regina =

Neighbourhood in Regina, Saskatchewan, Canada

Coordinates: 50.4477°N 104.5727°W

Glenelm Park is a neighbourhood in the east quadrant of the city of Regina, Saskatchewan, in Western Canada.

The neighbourhood is bounded by Canadian Pacific Railway tracks on the north, Victoria Avenue on the south, Ring Road on the east and Park Street on the west. It is a residential neighbourhood located east of the historic Germantown.

== Demographics ==
Prior to December 1, 1960, Glenelm Park was incorporated as a village, and was amalgamated with the City of Regina on that date.

Canada census – Glenelm Park, Regina community profile

Population
Land area
Population density
Median age
Private dwellings
Median household income

== See also ==
- List of neighbourhoods in Regina, Saskatchewan
