= Regina East (provincial electoral district) =

Former provincial electoral district in Saskatchewan, Canada

Regina East was a provincial electoral district in the Canadian Province of Saskatchewan. It was created prior to the election of 1964, when the four member Regina City constituency was broken up into two constituencies with two members each, Regina West and Regina East. Regina East was dissolved prior to the election of 1967, when multi-member constituencies were abolished.

== Election results ==
General Election, April 22, 1964
Party	Candidate	Popular Vote	%
Co-operative Commonwealth Federation	Yes Henry Baker	8,953	23.37%
Co-operative Commonwealth Federation	Yes Walter Smishek	8,395	21.91%
Liberal	Paul Dojack	8,208	21.42%
Liberal	Jacob Walter Erb	8,060	21.04%
Progressive Conservative	Dick Shelton	2,356	6.15%
Progressive Conservative	George Tkach	2,343	6.12%
Total		38,315	100.0%
Source: Saskatchewan Archives - Election Results by Electoral Division - Regina East

Yes Elected
X Incumbent

== See also ==
- List of Saskatchewan provincial electoral districts
- List of Saskatchewan general elections
- Canadian provincial electoral districts
