= Russell Sutor =

Canadian politician

Russell Allan "Russ" Sutor (April 24, 1951 – September 23, 1995) was a businessman and political figure in Saskatchewan. He represented Regina North East from 1982 to 1985 in the Legislative Assembly of Saskatchewan as a Progressive Conservative.

He was born in Mossbank, Saskatchewan, the son of Steve Sutor and Anetta Atkinson. Sutor operated a travel agency, a delivery service and a Regina motel. He served as legislative secretary to the Minister of Economic Development and Trade. Sutor resigned his seat in the Saskatchewan assembly in 1985 citing personal business reasons. He died in Fort Lauderdale, Florida at the age of 44.
