= James Andrew Darling =

Canadian politician

James Andrew Darling (May 21, 1891 – October 18, 1979) was a Scottish-born farmer and political figure in Saskatchewan, Canada. He represented Watrous in the Legislative Assembly of Saskatchewan from 1944 to 1960 as a member of the Co-operative Commonwealth Federation.

He was born in Shotts and came to Manitoba in 1908, settling near Colonsay, Saskatchewan in 1911. Darling served as a member of the municipal council, the school board and the local telephone board, as well as being involved with the Saskatchewan Wheat Pool. He served in the Saskatchewan cabinet as Minister of Public Works and Minister of Telephones. He was speaker for the assembly from 1957 until 1960, when he retired from politics. Darling died in Saskatoon at the age of 88.
