= Humboldt (federal electoral district) =

Former electoral district in Canada

Humboldt was a federal electoral district in Canada, that was represented in the House of Commons of Canada from 1904 to 1953. When it was created in 1903, it was part of the North-West Territories. When Saskatchewan became a province in 1905, Humboldt riding was in that province. It was abolished in 1952 when it was redistributed into Humboldt—Melfort, Mackenzie and Rosthern ridings.

== Members of Parliament ==
This riding elected the following members of Parliament:

1. A.J. Adamson, Liberal (1904–1908)
2. David Bradley Neely, Liberal (1908–1917)
3. Norman Lang, Unionist (1917–1921)
4. Charles Wallace Stewart, Progressive (1921–1925)
5. Albert Frederick Totzke, Liberal (1925–1935)
6. Harry Raymond Fleming, Liberal (1935–1942)
7. Joseph William Burton, Co-operative Commonwealth Federation (1943–1949)
8. Joseph Ingolph Hetland, Liberal (1949–1953)

== Election results ==
1908 Canadian federal election
| Party | Candidate | Votes |
|---|---|---|
| Liberal | NEELY, David Bradley | 3,524 |
| Conservative | LITTLE, James | 2,145 |

1911 Canadian federal election
| Party | Candidate | Votes |
|---|---|---|
| Liberal | NEELY, David Bradley | 7,265 |
| Conservative | HEARN, John Harvey | 2,947 |

1917 Canadian federal election
| Party | Candidate | Votes |
|---|---|---|
| Government (Unionist) | LANG, Norman | 5,536 |
| Opposition (Laurier Liberals) | BARRY, Joseph Leonard | 3,362 |

1921 Canadian federal election
| Party | Candidate | Votes |
|---|---|---|
| Progressive | STEWART, Charles Wallace | 10,280 |
| Liberal | MEILICKE, Otto Frederick | 4,707 |
| Conservative | LANG, Norman | 1,215 |

1925 Canadian federal election
| Party | Candidate | Votes |
|---|---|---|
| Liberal | TOTZKE, Albert Frederick | 3,212 |
| Progressive | STEWART, Charles Wallace | 2,536 |
| Conservative | WILSON, Edward S. | 967 |

1926 Canadian federal election
| Party | Candidate | Votes |
|---|---|---|
| Liberal | TOTZKE, Albert Frederick | 6,264 |
| Conservative | WILSON, Edward Sexton | 2,447 |

1930 Canadian federal election
| Party | Candidate | Votes |
|---|---|---|
| Liberal | TOTZKE, Albert Frederick | 7,915 |
| Conservative | WILSON, Edward Sexton | 3,984 |
| Progressive | KELLERMAN, Frank Henry | 2,116 |

1935 Canadian federal election
| Party | Candidate | Votes |
|---|---|---|
| Liberal | FLEMING, Harry Raymond | 6,877 |
| Co-operative Commonwealth | BURTON, Joseph William | 4,592 |
| Social Credit | MCCAFFERY, Joseph Patrick | 2,395 |
| Conservative | BLAND, Thomas | 1,171 |

1940 Canadian federal election
| Party | Candidate | Votes |
|---|---|---|
| Liberal | FLEMING, Harry Raymond | 8,808 |
| Co-operative Commonwealth | BOLSTER, Frank John | 7,536 |

By-election: On Mr. Fleming's death, 5 November 1942

By-election on 9 August 1943
| Party | Candidate | Votes |
| Co-operative Commonwealth | BURTON, Joseph William | 8,910 |
| Liberal | KRENN, Frank Stephen | 5,287 |
| Social Credit | LANGENHOFF, Theodore Fred | 251 |

1945 Canadian federal election
| Party | Candidate | Votes |
|---|---|---|
| Co-operative Commonwealth | BURTON, Joseph William | 7,843 |
| Liberal | LOEHR, Arnold W. | 6,380 |
| Social Credit | SCHMEISER, Charles A. | 1,094 |

1949 Canadian federal election
| Party | Candidate | Votes |
|---|---|---|
| Liberal | HETLAND, Joseph Ingolph | 8,123 |
| Co-operative Commonwealth | BURTON, Joseph William | 7,302 |
| Progressive Conservative | BENDAS, Orest | 1,022 |

== See also ==
- List of Canadian electoral districts
- Historical federal electoral districts of Canada
