= Kevin Yates (politician) =

Canadian politician

Kevin Yates is a Canadian politician, who served as an MLA in the Legislative Assembly of Saskatchewan from 1999 to 2011, for the constituency of Regina Dewdney.

Born February 17, 1963 in Carmichael, Saskatchewan, he moved to Regina in 1983. Before Yates was elected the MLA for Regina Dewdney he was employed by the Saskatchewan provincial government as a social worker and corrections worker for 15 years. He was the chief negotiator for the public service bargaining unit of SGEU for six years.

Yates was first elected to the Saskatchewan Legislature in a 1999 by-election for Regina Dewdney. He was re-elected in 2003.

In 2006 Yates was named to the Executive Council of Saskatchewan as Minister of Corrections and Public Safety and Deputy Government House Leader.

On September 15, 2006, Yates stepped down from his position as the Minister of Corrections and Public Safety for "personal reasons", which he declined to name, beyond explaining that he was not stepping down for health-related issues. Some media sources, along with Saskatchewan Party Opposition Leader Brad Wall, speculated that his "resignation" was the result of insubordination to Saskatchewan Premier Lorne Calvert.

Following a May 31, 2007 cabinet shuffle, Yates returned to cabinet as Minister of Community Resources and Minister Responsible for Disability Issues.
