= Timeline of the COVID-19 pandemic in Saskatchewan =

Sequence of major events in a virus pandemic

This is a timeline of the COVID-19 pandemic in Saskatchewan, listing key policies and developments from the first confirmed infection from SARS-CoV-2 in the province. Saskatchewan reported its first positive COVID-19 tests on March 12, 2020, and its first deaths on March 30.

Saskatchewan has been one of Canada's hardest hit provinces during the pandemic, often leading the country in per capita case rates and hospitalizations. The province's health care system has been severely strained by the pandemic. In late 2021, Saskatchewan transferred more than two dozen intensive care unit (ICU) patients to Ontario for treatment to help relieve its overburdened system. After declaring a state of emergency and instituting wide-reaching public health measures in March 2020, the Saskatchewan Party government, led by Premier Scott Moe, prioritized keeping businesses and schools open, generally hesitating to institute mandates, particularly once vaccines became widely available in the middle of 2021. The province was twice the first in the country to lift all pandemic-related public health orders, first in July 2021, and again in February 2022, the latter amidst a convoy protest occupying Ottawa partly organized by a truck driver from the province. As of July, 2023, 2,000 people in Saskatchewan have died from COVID-19.

== 2020 ==
=== Spring (March–June) ===
==== COVID-19 numbers ====
On March 12, Saskatchewan's Chief Medical Officer, Saqib Shahab, announced the first presumptive case of COVID-19 in the province: a person in their 60s in Saskatoon who had recently returned from traveling in Egypt, who was tested on March 9, and was in self-isolation at their home. By March 24, the province had 72 confirmed cases, including its first cases without clear exposures, suggesting community transmission. By March 30, the province had confirmed 176 cases, and on that day reported its first two deaths from COVID-19—two individuals in their 70s in separate parts of the province. The largest single-day increase in cases that month came on March 28, when the province announced 30 new cases; 18 of the new cases were linked to a snowmobile rally at Christopher Lake on March 14. By that day, the province also reported 6 hospitalizations, including 3 patients in intensive care units (ICU).

On April 8, the Saskatchewan Health Authority (SHA) released preliminary modelling data projecting "low", "mid", and "upper-range" scenarios with 153,000 and 3,075 deaths, 262,000 cases and 5,260 deaths, and 408,000 cases and 8,370 deaths, respectively; the projections were dependent on policy responses and public buy-in. In the first half of April, the number of new cases actually began to drop, with reported new cases dropping as low as a single new case on both April 14 and April 16. However, Saskatchewan experienced its first significant outbreak in the latter half of April, centered on the small northwestern community of La Loche and tied to workers traveling between the region and the Kearl Oil Sands Project near Fort McMurray, Alberta. New cases were also confirmed among staff and residents at long-term care facilities in Regina and La Loche. The SHA released updated modelling on April 28, showing that the spread of COVID was slowing and estimating 254,756 total cases and 3,050 deaths. By the end of April, Saskatchewan had confirmed 389 cases and seen 6 deaths from COVID-19; 69 of the 88 cases considered active on April 30 were in the north of the province.

The province announced two further outbreaks in northern Saskatchewan on May 1: one in Beauval and one at Victoria Hospital in Prince Albert, which was ultimately connected to the outbreak in La Loche. The province announced 34 new cases on May 4, the largest single-day increase since the start of the pandemic, with 29 of those cases in the north. On May 6, the province surpassed 500 cases. However, the number of new cases dropped again in the latter half of May. By the end of the month the province had confirmed 646 total cases and 11 deaths from COVID-19.

Saskatchewan reported only 5 new cases in the first seven days of June and 140 for the month. However, there were still outbreaks. The province reported 18 new cases on June 15, with 13 attributed to a wake and funeral in Clearwater River Dene Nation. On June 17, an outbreak was declared in two Hutterite colonies in the Rural Municipality of Maple Creek. 14 cases were initially tied to this outbreak, which was also thought to be connected to a funeral. On June 21, the province attributed 18 new cases to the latter outbreak.

==== Political responses ====
On March 12, the day of Saskatchewan's first presumptive case of COVID-19, Opposition Leader Ryan Meili called for the establishment of an all-party committee including members of the governing Saskatchewan Party, opposition New Democratic Party (NDP), and health and economics experts, to help manage the province's pandemic response; however, Premier Scott Moe rejected the idea. Moe did announce that he would not be calling a snap-spring election, which he had been musing about publicly for weeks. On March 13, the province announced its first pandemic measure, a restriction on indoor gatherings of more than 250 people, or 50 people if anyone present had traveled internationally. While the government suggested on March 16 that schools would stay open, Moe changed course in the face of pressure from teachers and parents and announced the following day that all schools would close by the end of the week. Also on March 17, the provincial government announced that it would be delaying the introduction of the budget, given the uncertainties of the economic impacts of the pandemic. The same day, the Legislature amended the Saskatchewan Employment Act to provide unpaid leave protection for workers.

The province declared a state of emergency on March 18, enabling the government to institute wide-reaching public health measures to try and mitigate the spread of the virus. Some of the immediate measures announced including a prohibition on gatherings of more than 50 people; the closure of fitness centres, casinos, and bingo halls; capacity limits at restaurants and event venues; advisories against non-essential travel outside of the province; social distancing measures; and a work-from-home policy for government ministries and crown corporations. On the same day, the Legislature suspended its spring session.

On March 19, Regina Mayor Michael Fougere called on the province to enact stricter measures, such as closing restaurants rather than merely limiting their capacity; this call was echoed by Saskatoon Mayor Charlie Clark. The following day, the city of Regina declared its own state of emergency, ordering the closure of non-essential businesses including restaurants and retail stores and limiting public gatherings to five people. Similarly, the town of Gravelbourg declared a state of emergency and made strict recommendations on March 22. Fougere acknowledged that provincial orders took precedence over municipal ones, rendering Regina's orders recommendations, but he said that he was "hoping the province will look at this over time and say it would agree". However, the provincial government opted to cancel those municipal orders; Government Relations Minister Lori Carr stated that "during this time of great uncertainty, it is of the utmost importance that we provide certainty to Saskatchewan residents and make every effort to minimize confusion." Cities were able to introduce measures in areas of their jurisdiction. For example, both Regina and Saskatoon suspended transit fares, while Saskatoon suspended utility disconnections and late payment charges, with Mayor Clark stating that the city would work to support vulnerable and homeless populations and those facing economic challenges.

On March 26, the government tightened gathering restrictions, limiting indoor gatherings to 10 people. The province also ordered the public closure of all "non-allowable business services", including business such as clothing, shoe, accessory, and jewelry stores, electronics, entertainment, and toy stores, flower shops, book, gift, and stationery stores, sporting goods stores, pawn shops, and travel agencies. In announcing these measures, Moe noted the importance of "trying to find the right balance between social distancing and keeping our economy in Saskatchewan."

===== Re-Open Saskatchewan =====
With new cases trending downwards, Moe stated on April 13 that the government was beginning to work on a plan to re-open businesses and lift certain public health orders, pending new cases remaining low and the implementation a robust system of testing and contact tracing. Nine days later, on April 22, Moe gave a televised address—the first by a Saskatchewan premier since Roy Romanow in the 1990s—announcing that the province had "flattened the curve" with a case rate 70% below the national average and hospitalizations and deaths 90% below average, and that he would be releasing a five-stage "re-opening" plan the following day to "gradually and methodically" lift restrictions on commerce and services. Alongside Chief Medical Officer Shahab, Moe unveiled the "Re-Open Saskatchewan" plan on April 23, with the first stage set to begin on May 4, which would see the re-opening of restricted medical services, such as dentistry and occupational therapy, and "low-risk" recreational activities like fishing, golfing, and camping. This made Saskatchewan the first province to release a plan to lift public health orders, with Moe stating that "We are as prepared as any jurisdiction can be." Opposition Leader Meili expressed some optimism about re-opening, but emphasized that the pandemic was far from over and that more direct supported was needed to help people get through it; moreover, Meili critiqued a lack of consultation with communities, including First Nations and Métis leaders, and a lack of coordination with other provinces and levels of government. He argued that what was needed was "a government doing it's due diligence to make sure that this is not an act that is about optics and about a political schedule but is about the best outcomes for the people of the province."

In response to the outbreak of cases in La Loche, the SHA first advised against non-essential travel between northern Saskatchewan and Alberta on April 18. The same day, the community of La Loche instituted a curfew requiring residents to remain at home between 10 p.m. and 7 a.m. Métis Nation—Saskatchewan also declared a state of emergency on April 18, given the high proportion of Metis residents in northern Saskatchewan and the "jurisdictional limbo" those communities found themselves in between the provincial and federal governments. On April 24, the provincial government restricted non-essential travel to and from northern Saskatchewan, enforced by checkpoints along highways serving the region, while advising northern residents to restrict travel between communities. Opposition Leader Meili called for more action to be taken in the northern region, including "mobiliz[ing] the resources necessary to test everyone in La Loche and Clearwater River Dene Nation." Tracy Zambory, president of the Saskatchewan Union of Nurses, similarly argued that "we're expecting a population that hasn't gotten much help in the past to suddenly understand and follow all these rules." On April 29, 11 of 17 new provincial cases were located in La Loche, with another four in Lloydminster, adding to a cluster of more than a dozen cases linked to the Lloydminster hospital; Moe therefore announced that both cities would be excluded from the first phase of the re-opening plan on May 4. On April 30, restrictions in northern Saskatchewan were tightened, with travel limited to medical and grocery shopping needs. Although La Ronge and Stony Rapids were initially exempted from these restrictions, those exemptions were removed in early May. On May 6, both federal Chief Public Health Officer Theresa Tam and Assembly of First Nations national chief Perry Bellegarde expressed concern about the situation in northern Saskatchewan, noting the particular vulnerability of under-resourced and often overcrowded Indigenous communities. On May 9, the Saskatchewan Liquor and Gaming Authority suspended all alcohol distribution in La Loche for two weeks in order to discourage gatherings.

Most of the province entered the first phase of the re-opening plan on May 4. On May 7, the outbreak at Lloydminster Hospital was deemed stable, and the city was given clearance to enter phase one of the plan on May 11. With the exception of La Loche, the province moved to phase two on May 19, allowing previously "non-allowable" businesses to re-open under certain guidelines. On June 8, the province moved to phase three, while La Loche was able to initiate phase two; phase three allowed for the re-opening of fitness centres, personal care services, restaurants at half-capacity, limited child-care services, and further outdoor recreational facilities like playgrounds.

On June 14, Chief Medical Officer Shahab commented that the re-opening was proceeding according to plan and stated that the province would not institute the same strict measures during future waves of COVID, but would try to manage the pandemic through measures like physical distancing and personal protective equipment.

In response to the outbreak among southern Hutterite colonies in mid-June, the SHA began working with the Hutterian Safety Council to facilitate testing among reports of resistance to testing in the colonies. It was reported that there had been a false sense of security among some colonies due to their isolated nature, and that "the unfortunate misunderstanding has taken root that positive COVID-19 tests would lead to an economic shutdown of their communities".

The fourth phase of the re-opening plan was ultimately divided into multiple stages. On June 22, outdoor recreation and sports were allowed to resume, and indoor gathering limits were raised to 30. On June 29, indoor recreation facilities including galleries, libraries, museums, and cinemas were allowed to re-open. On June 30, it was announced that all facilities would be allowed to re-open by mid-July, free from hard capacity limits but subject to two-metres of physical distancing. This left only limitations on the size of public gatherings, with Moe stating that "virtually every kind of business, facility, service and activity in this province are now reopened."

On June 30, Moe rejected a call from Opposition Leader Meili for a September legislative sitting in advance of the next provincial election in October.

==== Other responses ====
March 12 saw the cancellation of the Juno Awards, which were set to be hosted in Saskatoon, and the suspension of play in the Western Hockey League (WHL) and National Lacrosse League seasons.

On March 13, the University of Saskatchewan announced that it would be closing much of its campus and moving to remote course delivery. On March 26, Saskatchewan school divisions and the Saskatchewan Teachers' Federation (STF) announced that online learning would be available on a voluntary basis for the rest of the school year, offering students a chance to raise grades that had been frozen with in-person learning suspended.

Beginning in March, community-based organizations in Saskatoon formed the Inter-Agency Response to COVID-19, a coalition to coordinate services and advocate for vulnerable populations in the city during the pandemic. By May, more than 50 groups and organizations were participating in the coalition.

On May 12, the University of Saskatchewan and the University of Regina announced that the fall semester at each institution would be delivered predominantly remotely. Also in May, a team of researchers at the University of Saskatchewan led by historian Erika Dyck launched a community archive project with the aim of documenting experiences of the pandemic, in part to collect resources for future researchers.

=== Summer (July–September) ===
==== COVID-19 numbers ====
Beginning July 1, 2020, the province announced that it would release new case numbers only on weekdays, with weekends and statutory holidays numbers released on the next business day. However, this decision was reversed by the middle of the month when cases began to trend upwards again. The province announced 96 new cases between July 1 and 15, and 438 new cases between July 16 and 31, including a new daily record increase of 60 cases on July 22. Throughout July Saskatchewan continued to deal with outbreaks at Hutterite colonies in the southwest region of the province. As of July 16, the La Loche outbreak was declared over, with no active cases reported in the community. By the end of the month, Saskatchewan had the highest per-capita case rate among provinces in Canada. As of July 31, the province reported 1,008 of its 1,319 confirmed cases as "recovered"; the province had also confirmed 18 deaths by that date. Deaths confirmed in July included the youngest to date, a man in their 20s, which was reported on July 7.

Saskatchewan's case numbers decreased through August. The province confirmed 247 new cases between August 1 and 15, and 53 new cases between August 16 and 31, including two days with no new reported cases. By the end of the month, the province had confirmed 24 deaths from COVID-19 since the start of the pandemic. The outbreaks in the south of the province had subsided by the end of the month, and on August 28 Saskatchewan reported the lowest per-capita case rate among western provinces, a major turnaround from a month before.

Case numbers remained relatively low throughout September, although by the end of the month the SHA had issued a public alert about increased cases in Yorkton and opted to restrict access to long-term care homes and health centres in the area. On September 16, 21 new cases in Saskatoon were linked to a single gathering.

==== Political responses ====
The province followed through with lifting most public health orders by the middle of July, including allowing live entertainment, with only gathering size restrictions left in place.

In July, the city of Saskatoon provided $117,000 in emergency funding to the Inter-Agency Response to COVID-19 coalition, which faced a major budget shortfall after unsuccessfully seeking provincial funding.

In response to ongoing outbreaks in Hutterite colonies, the SHA continued to work with the colonies on testing and contact tracing, with greater success than in the spring. In addition, the province put travel restrictions in place around affected communities. However, by late July the Hutterian Safety Council took issue with the government specifying when new cases were linked to colonies, with chair David Tschetter expressing concerns about stigma and explaining, "To me, it says: 'Dear people of Saskatchewan, we have a Hutterite problem, we don't have a COVID problem".

On August 4, the province released its "Safe Schools Plan" for the 2020–2021 school year, a plan meant to help facilitate a return to in-person classes across the province's 27 school divisions. The plan, which required submissions from each school division, emphasized approaches that limited physical contact and emphasized self-monitoring for sickness, cleanliness, and access to protective equipment. The plan also included four levels of "alternative scenarios," with Level 1 indicating "as close to normal as possible"—the Level the province planned to start with in September—Level 2 including masking as directed by health officials, Level 3 resulting in reduced class sizes, and Level 4 resulting in remote delivery. The plan was criticized by the Opposition and community groups for not mandating masking or smaller class sizes, for lacking clear criteria for changing levels, and for failing to increase the budget available to school divisions. By August 12, several school divisions across the province announced that they would be requiring masking, effectively starting the year at Level 2.

In August, both Regina Mayor Fougere and Saskatoon Mayor Clark called on the province to adopt a masking mandate for indoor public spaces, and publicly discussed instituting municipal by-laws to that effect if the province failed to act.

On September 2, health officials warned against travel outside of Saskatchewan, particularly due to increasing cases in Alberta and Manitoba. Moe emphasized this advice, stating that "our neighbours to the east and west, they're seeing some rise in case numbers... if you don't have to travel to another province, please don't." The same day, Premier Moe stated that Saskatchewan was working with the federal government to support the roll-out of the national COVID Alert Exposure Notification app to the province.

On September 29, Premier Moe officially launched the election campaign ahead of the provincial election, which was to be held on October 26. Moe framed the campaign as one over the need for an economic recovery from the pandemic.

==== Other responses ====
The Inter-Agency Response to COVID-19 coalition that came together in Saskatoon during the spring released a report in July 2020 highlighting the importance of social determinants of health during the pandemic. The report noted a lack of consistent funding for community-based organizations and poverty-reduction, which the coalition argued was leading to worse outcomes for vulnerable populations during the pandemic. The provincial government was criticized for opening only 10 of 350 vacant Saskatchewan Housing Authority units and for making only $171,000 of emergency funding available to be divided among 10 emergency shelters across the province. The coalition also warned that vulnerable populations remained particularly susceptible to a new wave of COVID cases, and that re-opening plans had not taken their needs into account.

Country Thunder Saskatchewan, an annual country music concert held in Craven each July, was cancelled in 2020. In August, the Canadian Football League announced that its 2020 season, which had already been delayed, was cancelled; Regina had originally been scheduled to host the Grey Cup championship. The WHL delayed the start of its 2020–21 season that same month. In early September, the province's universities announced that they would remain predominantly remote for the winter semester. The president of the University of Regina Students' Union commented that university students were struggling with mental health challenges during the pandemic.

=== Fall (October–December) ===
==== COVID-19 numbers ====
COVID case numbers began rising dramatically in Saskatchewan during the fall season, and the province experienced a number of significant outbreaks. After a relatively quiet start to October, the province began reporting record case numbers, reaching a new peak of 82 new cases on October 29. Earlier in the month, on October 7, the SHA declared a multi-jurisdictional outbreak linked to services at Full Gospel Outreach in Prince Albert, which included more than 100 people from across the province, including people in First Nations communities. By October 19, 86 cases in 17 communities had been attributed to the outbreak. Suspected exposures at nightclubs in the Saskatoon area led to surging cases there in the latter half of October; it was alleged by one club that the SHA had approved isolating "dance cubes" before an outbreak occurred there. By the end of the month, the province had confirmed more than 1,200 new cases in that month alone; 29 people were in hospital with COVID-19, and the province had confirmed 25 deaths since the start of the pandemic.

In November, the province routinely reported new case counts in the triple-digits, including a new record of 439 on November 21, when the province also reported 93 hospitalizations, including 21 in ICU. By late-November, there had been 22 outbreaks reported in schools across the province. By late in the month, it was also clear that the province's prison system was experiencing a large outbreak, with 72 confirmed cases at the Saskatoon Provincial Correctional Centre (SPCC) facility reported on November 26, including 68 among inmates at the facility. By the end of November, the number of sick inmates had risen to 106, in addition to 23 staff at the facility. Also that month, an outbreak was declared at Regina's Extendicare Parkside long-term care home, with 24 cases—including 17 among residents—reported confirmed on November 24.

By December 9, when the SHA declared the Extendicare Parkside outbreak an emergency, 149 residents had been infected, along with 57 staff members; 11 residents had died from the outbreak. In mid-December, 25 residents were moved to another Regina long-term care home; 18 of those residents became sick, and 1 died. By the end of the year, 36 Extendicare Parkside residents had died. Luther Special Care Home, a long-term care facility in Saskatoon, also experienced an outbreak, which began in mid-November and by December 16 had resulted in 9 deaths. In December, a new outbreak was declared at Saskatchewan Penitentiary in Prince Albert, highlighting a worsening situation in the province's prisons. By December 23, 126 inmates and 12 staff had been confirmed sick. The facility had the most cases of any prison in Canada at the time.

In all, 108 deaths from COVID were reported confirmed during the month of December alone. By December 31, when the province announced 190 new cases, the provincial total of confirmed cases for 2020 stood at 15,350, with 155 confirmed deaths from COVID-19. At that time, 142 people were in hospital with COVID-19, including 30 in intensive care; hospitalizations had peaked at 182 on December 28.

===== Vaccination campaign =====
On December 9, 2020, the SHA announced plans to begin a phased rollout of COVID-19 vaccines, beginning with the Pfizer‑BioNTech vaccine, which had been approved by Health Canada earlier that day. The roll-out would initially target health care workers as part of a pilot program in mid-December, and by the end of the month the SHA would initiate the first phase of its plan, targeting the province's highest-risk populations, such as long-term care residents, seniors over 80, and residents in remote northern communities. A second phase was expected to be rolled out in the spring of 2021. On December 15, the first vaccine doses in the province were administered, with the first going to the SHA's head of critical care in the Regina area. By December 31, the province reported that 3,458 doses had been administered as part of the pilot program and first phase of its vaccination campaign.

==== Political responses ====
The dramatic increase in cases across Saskatchewan in the fall prompted a gradual increase in public health orders over several weeks, although this was limited by earlier commitments that the province would not institute new "lockdown" measures. The province first moved to limit gathering sizes, with Chief Medical Officer Shahab announcing a limit of 15 at "private gatherings" as of October 16; those limits did not apply to businesses. The province also announced a $14,000 fine for Full Gospel Outreach in Prince Albert, attributing the outbreak there to a failure to follow public health orders and provincial guidelines. On November 3, a mask mandate for indoor public spaces was announced for Prince Albert, Regina, and Saskatoon, as well as a further reduction of private gathering limits from 15 to 10. That mandate was extended ten days later to all communities with a population of more than 5,000; the same day, the province also placed a 10 p.m. curfew on alcohol sales, placed limits on the size of fitness classes, and prohibited hookah and waterpipe services, except at licensed establishments; the province also recommended that all high schools with more than 600 students move to Level 3, or reduced capacity. On November 17, as the province surpassed 2,000 active cases, Moe announced a "significant one-month slowdown". This included making the mask mandate province-wide, a reduction of private gathering limits from 10 to 5, restrictions on visitation at long-term care facilities, and a recommendation to work from home where possible; the province also said it would be working with the hospitality industry to try and mitigate the spread of COVID. Moe stated that "we have too many new cases, we have too many in intensive care, and we need to do what we can to get these numbers down." However, he re-buffed calls from the Opposition to institute a "circuit-breaker" lockdown, or a multi-week closure of businesses to slow the rate of new cases. Opposition Leader Meili asserted on November 22 that Moe "doesn't have a good understanding of what's going on. He's in over his head and he's making the wrong choices and we're all going to pay for it."

The SHA released updated modelling on November 19, showing a "best-case scenario" of 4,830 additional cases and 34 deaths over the following six months. Health Minister Paul Merriman announced that the province was receiving help from the federal government with contact tracing. On November 24, the SHA released data showing that indoor recreational facilities and large gatherings were the largest known sources of recent infections outside of homes. The province announced the next day that capacity restrictions for indoor gatherings and recreational facilities would be tightened, with indoor event and entertainment venues limited to 30 people, restrictions on the capacity of bars and restaurants, and the suspension of most group and team sports activity. Shabab stated that cases tied to sports were becoming "frequent", especially in children's sports, and that he had concerns that they were being imported into schools and workplaces. On December 14, Moe stated that 2020 would see "a different kind of Christmas", and the province announced that outdoor gatherings were limited to 10 people; that no indoor private gatherings could take place involving people from outside of an immediate household; that casinos and bingo halls would be closing; and that there were new capacity restrictions for retail stores taking effect December 25.

On December 3, with the province surpassing 4,000 active cases, the SHA announced plans to "slow down" some of its services, largely in diagnostic, home care, and elective surgeries, allowing it to redeploy nearly 600 full-time workers in order to meet demand. The move underscored the significant strain that the pandemic was placing on the province's health care system. The SHA had also issued 8 fines totaling $44,800 to residents and businesses violating public health orders.

On December 9, the SHA declared the Extendicare Parkside outbreak an emergency. This led to an agreement that the SHA would co-manage the facility until at least January 15, 2021. The crowded nature of the facility—it had four beds to a room—was cited as a probable factor in the rapid spread of COVID among residents. In addition, a lack of proper ventilation, which had been noted as early as 2013 and as recently as 2019, was a contributing factor. In response to the emergency, the Opposition and a number of unions representing health care workers called on the province to call an inquiry into its long-term care residences.

On November 25, the city of Saskatoon announced that it was working with local organizations and businesses on a new plan to encourage compliance with public health orders and to combat "misinformation" about COVID-19 and the pandemic.

Inmates at SPCC expressed concern and fear over a lack of information when the facility became the site of an outbreak. Prisoner and advocate Cory Cardinal stated that "There's a lot of stress here, from the inmates that want to know what's going on with the pandemic... there's an atmosphere of growing alarm here." SPCC was effectively closed off from the rest of the prison system, with all new inmates redirected to Regina or Prince Albert; mandatory masking and mass testing was also introduced in the system. The situation led to the Opposition and prisoners' advocates calling for remanded prisoners to be released, a call that the provincial government rejected. In response to the later outbreak at Saskatchewan Penitentiary, inmates launched a hunger-strike to protest unsanitary conditions that they said were contributing to the spread of the outbreak.

Both Premier Moe and Opposition Leader Meili condemned a growing number of protests against public health measures throughout the fall, although Meili criticized Moe for doing so only when directly prompted in the Legislature. When prompted, Moe said that such protests "shouldn't be happening", and he was particularly concerned that such demonstrations openly encouraged people to defy public health orders.

When the SHA released its vaccination schedule, Chief Medical Officer Shahab stated that residents would be able to "get closer to our normal routines" once mass immunization was achieved, but that in the meantime, they would have to continue following all public health orders. For his part, Premier Moe stated that vaccines "are the finish line in this very long fight against the COVID-19 virus".

===== 2020 elections =====
Elections took place in Saskatchewan at both the municipal and provincial levels in the fall of 2020, and the pandemic factored prominently into both. Saskatchewan was the third province with an election since the beginning of the pandemic, after New Brunswick and British Columbia.

The Saskatchewan general election took place on October 26, 2020. Scott Moe framed the election largely around "recovering" from the pandemic, and the Saskatchewan Party and NDP, led by a doctor in Ryan Meili, offered different options for responding to COVID. Moe persistently argued that the election would decide how the province would recover economically, while Meili charged that a Moe government would pursue austerity to balance the budget; Moe also continued to vow not to re-instate "lockdown" measures in the province, while Meili committed to producing clear criteria that would guide public health measures. The fall election was the first for the Buffalo Party—originally known as Wexit—which had only registered as a party in March 2020. The party's platform opposed mandatory public health measures, such as masking, in response to the pandemic.

On October 26, the Saskatchewan Party won 48 of 61 seats for its fourth consecutive majority government. Notably, the Buffalo Party, which ran candidates in only 17 constituencies, finished second in 4 of them, all of them in rural areas. The NDP won 13 seats, its most since 2007, and 31% of the vote. The election saw record numbers of voters cast their ballots in advance polls or by mail, options that were expanded due to the pandemic. More than 56,000 mail-in ballots were counted, while more than 185,000 ballots were counted at advance polls, together accounting for 54% of all ballots. Overall turnout was 53%. It was later reported that Elections Saskatchewan spent nearly $7 million more than expected on the election, largely to mitigate risks due to the pandemic.

Saskatchewan municipal elections took place on November 9, 2020, although elections in a number of places were delayed by a severe snowstorm. In Saskatoon, incumbent Charlie Clark argued he was best suited to guide the city through the pandemic and after, and he was re-elected; the city saw its lowest turnout since 2000 at just 27%, with a high proportion of those voting opting for advance polls and mail-in ballots. In Regina, political newcomer Sandra Masters became the first woman elected mayor in either of the province's major cities, unseating incumbent Michael Fougere.

==== Other responses ====
In response to outbreaks in schools, a number of school divisions moved to high levels in the Safe Schools Plan. A high school in Yorkton was the first to move to Level 4—online learning—in late September. In early November, Regina Public school division moved all of its high schools to Level 3, or alternate day learning to reduce class sizes.

In the fall, Saskatchewan became the site of an increasing number of protests against masking and other public health orders. These ranged from a small number of demonstrators in Regina in early November to a rally of more than 200 in Saskatoon in December. The demonstrations were frequently organized by former local candidates for the People's Party of Canada, including the latter in Saskatoon, which was dubbed the "Saskatchewan Freedom Rally". That rally in particular clearly contravened public health orders, which restricted outdoor gatherings to 30 people at the time. Those protesting were frequently criticized for espousing conspiracy theories.

The Inter-Agency Response to COVID-19 urged in December that vaccines should be distributed fairly among the population, including homeless populations, and also that vulnerable populations would need a continued and urgent focus even after the province's vaccination campaign.

== 2021 ==
=== Winter (January–March) ===
==== COVID-19 numbers ====
January quickly surpassed December as the deadliest month of the pandemic to date in Saskatchewan. The province twice set new single day highs for reported deaths, with 13 reported on January 21 and 14 on January 26. In all 149 people died with COVID-19 in January, including 7 people under the age of 50. At the time, that number represented 49% of all reported deaths from the pandemic. Before the mid-point of the month, the weekly average for new daily confirmed cases had surpassed 300, and on January 11, 197 people hospitalized with COVID-19. The number in hospital surpassed 200 by the end of the month, including 31 in intensive care on January 31. Outbreaks were declared across the province, including at multiple long-term care homes and childcare centres, workplaces such as a pork plant in Wood Mountain, the hospital in Assiniboia, and a community outbreak in the northern community of Pinehouse. One of the biggest outbreaks was tied to a karaoke bar in Saskatoon; an outbreak linked to the establishment was declared on January 9, and by January 20 more than 80 cases were linked to it. By the end of January 2021, the province had reported 35,359 vaccine doses administered.

February marked the arrival of the Alpha variant of COVID to Saskatchewan, with the first two cases reported in Regina on February 2, followed by another in Saskatoon on February 4; each of the cases was linked to recent travel. While overall case numbers in the province trended downwards during February, case numbers in Regina began increasing, suggesting that the city was being particularly hard hit by the new variant. Overall, the province added 84 deaths in February. The province also more than doubled its reported vaccine doses administered, finishing the month at a total of 78,226. As of February 28, there were 154 people in hospital with COVID-19, including 19 in intensive care. At this time, Saskatchewan led the country in per-capita cases.

As of March 1, the province's ability to test for variants of concern was boosted when the Roy Romanow Provincial Laboratory in Regina was validated for whole genome sequencing. Regina remained the provincial hot spot throughout the month; by the end of the first week of the month, Regina's test positivity rate of 12.8% far exceeded the provincial rate of 5.5%. By March 12, the SHA reported that up to 80% of recently screened cases in Regina were likely variants of concern. By March 23, the province had confirmed just under 900 variant cases, with the majority in Regina. By the end of the month, the number of confirmed variant cases had risen to more than 1,600, with more than 1,300 of them in Regina. Overall, the province saw 51 further deaths in March, bringing the total to 436. As of March 31, 166 people were in hospital with COVID-19, including 23 in intensive care. By that date, the province had also administered 192,927 vaccine doses.

==== Political responses ====
On January 4, 2021, Minister of Highways Joe Hargrave announced his resignation, after criticism over a recent trip to Palm Springs, California to finalize the sale of a home there. Hargrave had apologized for the trip, explaining that it had been approved by the Premier, and that "my decision to travel was an error in judgement at a time when so many people have had to make sacrifices during the pandemic." The NDP questioned whether the travel was essential, especially after the December 31 resignation of Ontario's Finance Minister Rod Phillips amid a similar controversy, but the Saskatchewan government stated that it did not plan to remove Hargrave from office. Opposition Leader Meili argued that "[Premier Moe's] telling the people of Saskatchewan one thing, demanding one thing of Saskatchewan people, but doing something very different when it comes to his own cabinet members."

On January 12, the existing health orders amended December 14, 2020 were renewed through January 29, with no changes. Saskatchewan's seven-day rolling average peaked at 321 cases per-day. As of January 13, Saskatchewan had the highest number of new cases per-capita nationwide.

On January 15, the province reported that at least 56 cases had been tied to a restaurant in Saskatoon.

On January 23, Premier Moe criticized a group of individuals that had harassed the Chief Medical Officer by participating in a "misguided protest" outside of his personal home. He stated on Twitter, "To those that did this - you should be ashamed of yourselves and your actions. After months of spending virtually every waking hour working tirelessly to protect the health and well being of Saskatchewan people though this pandemic, this is the last thing Dr. Shahab deserves."

On January 26, the existing health orders amended December 14, 2020 were renewed through February 19, again with no changes, with Premier Moe citing that the seven-day rolling average had been seen a gradual decrease.

A study between November 2020 and January 2021 by the University of Saskatchewan's Population Health and Evaluation Research Unit (SPHERU), found that 67% of 1,500 residents surveyed did not believe the current provincial health orders were sufficient.

In the wake of the discovery, Premier Moe and Chief Medical Officer Shahab emphasized continued adherence to the current provincial health orders, but it was stated that officials were evaluating the impact of SARS-CoV-2 variants on health care and public health orders. One more case of B.1.1.7 was reported by the SHA on February 4, a resident of Saskatoon who had recently returned from Southeast Asia.

On February 16, the existing health orders amended December 14, 2020, were renewed through March 19, once again with no changes.

In a press briefing on March 2, Moe suggested that the province may announce an ease of restrictions as early as next week. Shahab stated that hospitalizations and the number of cases per 100,000 had been trending downwards (although Saskatchewan still led the country in active cases per-capita). In regards to the spike in Regina, Shahab said that it was still undetermined whether community spread of variants was causing the increase.

On March 9, the province announced a partial loosening of health orders; families may form a social bubble with one or two other consistent households, no larger than ten people, and beginning March 19, worship services would be allowed to expand from 30 to 150 attendees. The province also announced 35 new variant cases, primarily B.1.1.7, from a survey of 190 positive cases from between January 26 and February 27 by the provincial lab.

On March 12, 2021, the SHA reported that 77 cases in Regina carried a mutation identified via single nucleotide polymorphism (SNP) screenings being performed on all COVID-19-positive samples (which identify the presence of a mutation, but not the lineage; until March 16 these were reported in government statistics as a "presumptive positive"). The SHA issued an advisory regarding increased community transmission of variants of concern in the Regina area, including a recommendation against non-essential shopping and travel, advising residents over the age of 50 to reconsider expanding household bubbles, and that stating that public health measures may be considered if the number of variant cases do not decline. Medical Health Officer Maurice Hennink stated that at least 70-80% of cases recently sequenced had tested for a variant.

On March 16, 2021, the SHA reported 101 new confirmed cases in the Regina area (out of 156 province-wide), 61 new confirmed variant cases (a total of 136), and 186 new "presumptive" variant cases. The existing health orders amended December 14, 2020 were renewed through April 5. Besides the Regina area being excluded from the planned increase in capacity for worship services until at least April 5, and a recommendation that residents avoid non-essential travel into or out of the Regina area, no further restrictions were announced. Mayor of Regina Sandra Masters stated that "many of our outbreaks are a result of people going to work [...] going into public places and household gathering[s] while symptomatic", and that the actions she could take were limited due to jurisdictional limits.

On March 23, the opposition NDP called for a two-week circuit breaker in Regina and surrounding communities, including the closure of dine-in restaurants, encouraging remote work, and prohibiting household gatherings. Health Critic Vicki Mowat stated that such measures would "help get case numbers under control and prevent hospitals from being overwhelmed while the vaccines are deployed." The province reported that there was a total of 360 variant cases confirmed to-date via sequencing and 891 confirmed via SNP screening.

Later that day, the province announced a series of targeted public health orders for Regina and its surrounding communities. Private indoor gatherings with people from outside of the immediate household were prohibited effective immediately, and dine-in bars and restaurants, and any other "non-essential indoor locations that had limits of 30 individuals" (including indoor arts, event, and entertainment venues), were ordered closed effective 12:01 a.m. CST on March 28, 2021. The city of Regina announced that it would voluntarily close city-run recreational facilities (besides playgrounds) for the duration of the order. In addition, the province announced a formal advisory against non-essential travel into or out of Regina and surrounding communities, and is "strongly recommending" remote work where possible. Premier Moe explained that these measures were intended to help reduce contacts and "slow things down", and would initially apply through at least April 5, but were "very likely" to be extended.

On March 27, the SHA issued advisories for the city of Moose Jaw regarding increased transmission.

On March 30, Premier Moe announced that all existing public health orders, including the newly implemented restrictions in Regina, would be renewed through April 12. Moe and Shahab also urged caution for the Easter holiday weekend, recommending against indoor gatherings (where allowed), especially in the Moose Jaw area and southeastern Saskatchewan. The South Central 2 zone containing Moose Jaw had 106 active cases, with Shahab stating that the city alone accounted for at least 95. The larger South Central region had the second largest number of VoC cases among the regions province-wide, behind only Regina.

While the possibility of extending the stricter public health orders to Moose Jaw had been discussed, Moe argued that this was "not the goal", and Shahab encouraged voluntary compliance. Moe also emphasized vaccination, arguing that increasing numbers of cases among younger residents "speaks to the fact that the vaccines are working," public health orders were "nothing more than a stopgap to buy us time until we get the majority of Saskatchewan residents vaccinated", and that the province aimed for the total number of doses it has administered to-date to roughly double over the next 15–20 days.

=== Spring (April–June) ===
On April 5, 2021 there were 47 COVID-19 patients in intensive care, a record high for the third day in a row, with the majority being in Regina. Wastewater surveillance by the University of Saskatchewan also forecast increasing positivity in the Saskatoon area.

On April 6, Health Minister Paul Merriman stated that the province's overall intensive care unit (ICU) capacity was stable, but that he was still concerned for the situation in Regina. Merriman and Moe also dismissed calls to prioritize essential workers for vaccination, arguing that the strictly age-based approach was the "most efficient and quickest way" to distribute them. On April 7, all current public health orders were renewed through April 26, with no changes.

On April 9, the province reported its largest single-day increase in new cases since January, at 358. On April 12, the province announced that it planned to vaccinate additional essential workers, including health care workers that were not covered under Phase 1 of the initial rollout, first responders via mobile clinics, and the staff of pharmacies and the grocery stores they are attached to. On April 13, the province announced that private home gatherings and the size of worship services would be rolled back outside of Regina, with private household gatherings once again prohibited, and worship services reduced to 30 people. On April 14, the SHA issued an advisory for the Saskatoon area due to increasing VoC transmission, requesting that residents follow all public health orders, work remotely when possible, and not perform non-essential travel to or from the area.

Also on April 14, the SHA declared a heightened risk of COVID-19 VoC transmission in Davidson, Kindersley, Maple Creek, Rosetown, Swift Current, and Moose Jaw, due to an outbreak tied to an "outdoor gathering in southwest Saskatchewan". The next day, this advisory was extended to Outlook, and it was stated that the outbreak was tied to a "recreational party" on April 2 in the Maple Creek area, which violated limits on gathering sizes and had minimal adherence to public health orders. The RCMP was investigating the incident. During a council meeting on April 12, mayor of Maple Creek Michelle McKenzie had told the RCMP that she recently had concerns over "excessive partiers" violating the public health orders. McKenzie subsequently announced that she was urging all residents of Maple Creek to follow the public health orders and immediately seek testing if they show any signs of symptoms. On April 16, vaccine eligibility expanded, with bookings for residents 48 years old and older.

On April 19, Moe and Merriman declined invitations to tour the ICU at Regina's General Hospital, while Opposition Leader Meili took the opportunity to tour the unit. Hospital staff were quoted as saying, "If only the leadership would come and see what's really going on here, they would understand what we're dealing with."

On April 20, the province announced that it had sequenced five cases of Lineage P.1 in the South West zone. All current public health orders were renewed through May 10, with no changes. Following similar decisions by other provinces, Saskatchewan announced that it would extend eligibility of the AstraZeneca vaccine to residents 40 and over beginning April 28, and that it will prioritize other frontline workers such as healthcare workers, teachers, police and fire departments, corrections, and border officers.

On April 26, Merriman stated that the province had been prioritizing vaccination in Saskatoon in order to protect the health care system from being overwhelmed due to variants. On April 27, for the first time since the beginning of the current wave, Saskatoon led the province in newly-reported cases, with 70 (as opposed to 30 in Regina).

On May 4, Premier Moe announced plans to begin lifting the current public health orders under a three-step plan, if specific vaccination targets are met. On May 5, Saskatchewan surpassed 500 deaths attributed to COVID-19. On May 6, the test positivity rate fell below 5% for the first time since the end of March.

On May 9, Saskatchewan satisfied the target for Step 1 of the reopening plan, with 71% of adults 40 and over having received at least one vaccine dose. Premier Moe announced per the plan, that it was targeting implementation of Step 1 three weeks from May 9 (May 30).

On May 23, Saskatchewan's seven-day average and hospitalizations reached their lowest levels since mid-April. Active cases had been declining in Regina, while Saskatoon was leading the province's regions in active cases. With second doses beginning the next day for residents 80 and over, the province reached the target of 70% of adults 30 and older with one dose needed in order to qualify for Step 2. Step 1 took effect on May 30.

On June 1, the province recorded only 86 new cases, its smallest increase since February 24. Premier Moe announced that the province would lift its mask mandate and restrictions on larger gatherings in Step 3 if 70% of all residents aged 12 and older receive at least one vaccine dose.

=== Summer (July–September) ===
On July 11, Step 3 of the reopening plan took effect, meaning that almost all remaining public health orders (including the mask mandate) were withdrawn.

A major outbreak occurred in the Hatchet Lake Dene Nation, which on July 8 contributed to Saskatchewan's largest single-day increase in cases (113) since early-June.

In late-July, another major outbreak was reported in the Buffalo River Dene Nation, which by July 23 had reached 65 cases. The NITHA believed that evacuation efforts for wildfires in the region (where 250 residents were sheltered in hotel rooms in Lloydminster), and complacency following the lifting of public health orders, were factors in the outbreak. Chief Elmer Campbell believed the outbreak was imported by residents travelling to larger centres for supplies during the evacuation, but also criticized the province's lifting of restrictions without factoring in low vaccination rates in Northern Saskatchewan, and demanded that enforceable public health orders be reinstated in the region in order to control the outbreak. Campbell argued that "Facebook doctors" spreading misinformation had led to anti-vaccination rhetoric in the region, despite its best efforts to incentivize vaccination.

By July 30, the North zones accounted for nearly half of Saskatchewan's active cases, which had doubled in the past 10 days. The province reported that the majority of new cases in July were among individuals who were not vaccinated.

By August, the number of new first doses had largely stalled, and the province had discontinued regular communications regarding COVID-19 (including press conferences and the daily press releases summarizing case and vaccination statistics). On August 11, it was reported that the Ministry of Health was evaluating a request by officials in Saskatchewan's northern regions—which were leading the country in new cases per-100,000—to reinstate enforceable public health orders on a regional basis to control the current surges in the region. On August 12, Saskatchewan reported 141 new cases—the province's largest single-day increase since late-May—with the majority of new cases being within the Far North, Saskatoon, and South East regions. Saskatoon's medical health officer declared that a fourth wave had begun in the area.

By August 22, the seven-day average reached 166, and the province had over 1,500 active cases—the majority of which being within the Saskatoon zone. On August 23, the SHA announced that case numbers would not be released that day due to unspecified issues. The next day, the province announced that 255 tests had been rendered "invalid" due to instrument issues at the Roy Romanow Provincial Laboratory, and that the affected individuals had been retested. 206 of the new tests had a different result from the first test, and 54 of the invalid tests were false positives involving residents of long-term care homes in Regina.

By late-August, there were calls by medical officials for mitigations such as mandatory masks, reinstating mandatory self-isolation for positive cases and close contacts, and mandatory vaccination of health care workers, provincial employees, and municipal employees, citing the fourth wave and Saskatchewan's reluctance to reinstate public health measures. On August 30, after the Saskatchewan Roughriders football team announced plans to mandate that spectators be fully-vaccinated, Moe reiterated that the province would work with and develop solutions (such as a digital proof of vaccination) for entities who voluntarily choose to require vaccination, but that the province will not issue public health orders restricting businesses or activities to the fully-vaccinated (as have provinces such as B.C. and Manitoba).

On September 10, Saskatchewan reported 432 new cases; it was the province's largest single-day increase of 2021, and its second-largest increase overall. 363 of the cases were among individuals who were not vaccinated, and 34% were among residents 19 and younger. Premier Moe announced that the province would expand its testing and contact tracing resources (including contracting private providers, and having ordered new shipments of rapid test kits), and reinstate mandatory self-isolation for unvaccinated positive cases and close contacts. The SHA stated that it would reduce elective medical services in order to provide additional capacity. Moe once again ruled out the restoration of any other public health measure such as mandatory masking, as he considered them to be stopgaps until the availability of vaccines.

On September 13, Saskatchewan surpassed 200 hospitalizations for the first time since April 2021, and reported 449 new cases—its largest single-day increase to-date, and largest since November 2020. 89% of new cases were among individuals who were not vaccinated. This was exceeded the next day with 506 new cases, with the majority being in the Far North East, North West, North Central, and Saskatoon zones, 436 of them being among unvaccinated residents, and 101 reported to be among children younger than 12 (who are currently ineligible for COVID-19 vaccines).

On September 16, Premier Moe announced the reinstatement of the provincial mask mandate, as well as plans to begin mandating proof of vaccination for certain activities beginning in October. Moe stated that "the time for patience is now over. The choice to not get vaccinated is not just affecting you, it's now seriously impacting those who did do the right thing." On September 28, the SHA ceased offering COVID-19 testing for asymptomatic patients unless they are a close contact of a positive case, or had tested positive on an antigen test. On September 30, the province reported over 600 new cases in a day for the first time, and neared 700 deaths in total.

On September 30, MLA Nadine Wilson was forced to resign from caucus for lying about their vaccination status, with all MLAs at the time required to be vaccinated in order to attend the Legislature. After the resignation, Wilson sat as an Independent MLA.

=== Fall (October–December) ===
On October 1, presentation of a proof of vaccination or recent negative test became mandatory in order to be admitted to dine-in restaurants, event and entertainment facilities, ticketed sporting events, gyms, and retail liquor and cannabis stores. On the same day, a Court of Queen's Bench justice in Saskatoon threw out a case brought forward by a number of groups seeking to argue that the proof-of-vaccination policy violated Charter rights. The groups included "Unified Grassroots," "Concerned Citizens (Estevan)," and former People's Party of Canada candidate Mark Friesen.

On October 5, Saskatchewan set a new record for current COVID-19 hospitalizations for the third day in a row, having increased to 340, with 73 in an ICU, and 76% not being fully vaccinated. On October 7, Premier Moe announced that responsibility for Saskatchewan's response to the pandemic would be transferred to the Provincial Emergency Operations Centre (PEOC), to "better coordinate the pandemic response between government ministries and our healthcare delivery." The PEOC will establish a joint team consisting of members of the Ministry of Health and the SHA, and be responsible for management of staffing and all future public communications (including media briefings) regarding COVID-19 moving forward.

On October 17, Saskatchewan exceeded 84 COVID-19 patients in ICU–its largest number to-date. On October 20, the SHA released modelling projecting that the current hospitalization surge would extend into 2022 without additional public health measures, but that a scenario with a combination of vaccine boosters for vulnerable populations and a 28-day reduction in population mixing (whether voluntary or mandated via public health order) would have the greatest impact on reducing ICU numbers. It was stated that 68% of hospitalizations were patients who were not vaccinated at all, and nearly half of hospitalizations formally received their positive test upon or after admission.

In an SHA physicians' town hall on October 21, it was stated that Saskatchewan had the most ICU patients per-capita out of all Canadian provinces, and that provincial ICU capacity in total had reached its "red zone" of between 116 and 149 patients, which would necessitate the transfer of patients out-of-province. Saskatchewan reached agreements to transfer ICU patients to hospitals in Ontario. One of the patients transferred is reportedly Mark Friesen, who had earlier attempted to take the province to court to overturn its vaccination policies.

During a speech on October 25, Premier Moe stated that "we've been hit hard by a fourth wave of this pandemic and there are pressures in our health care system", but that cases were trending downward due to vaccination progress and the new proof of vaccination requirements (which he credited with a 7% increase in vaccine administered since the announcement), and that there would be no new public health restrictions as they would be unfair to the vaccinated. Opposition Leader Meili criticized the speech as a "slap in the face", accusing Moe of downplaying Saskatchewan's high case rate, low vaccination rate, fatalities, and having to send ICU patients out of province and receive assistance from the Canadian Armed Forces. On October 26, a health official told CTV News Regina that the actual number of positive cases in Saskatchewan may be under-reported due to high test positivity and a decline in the number of tests administered.

In early December, Moe reportedly engaged in an hour-long phone conversation with Nadine Ness, the head of "Unified Grassroots," one of the groups that had tried to take the province to court over its vaccination policies and one known for its opposition to public health measures and its links to protests at hospitals and COVID conspiracy theories.

On December 16, the province announced that all adults that had received a second COVID-19 vaccine dose at least three months prior would become eligible to receive booster doses beginning December 20.

On December 17, it was reported that the cost for the 27 ICU patients that were transferred from Saskatchewan to Ontario between October and December would be more than $1.3 million.

By December 2021, Saskatchewan's daily case numbers and hospitalizations had seen a decline to levels not seen since August 2021. However, with the arrival of Omicron variant in the province, cases began to once again escalate by the end of the month, but hospitalizations continued to slowly decline in comparison to their earlier peak. A total of 896 cases were reported between December 24 and 28 (during which the SHA did not publish daily summaries due to the Christmas holiday), with increasing spread of Omicron variant province-wide, and especially in Regina and Saskatoon.

While the Saskatchewan government had considered re-implementing restrictions on gatherings over the holiday period (as have all other provinces) to control the spread of Omicron variant, the province did not implement any new restrictions. However, Shahab recommended that residents keep gatherings "small and consistent", and "be very cautious with large gatherings".

On December 30, Premier Moe announced that the province would not implement new public health orders at this time, and would (against the current recommendations of the Public Health Agency of Canada, but in line with new guidance issued by the U.S. CDC earlier that week) reduce the mandatory self-isolation period for COVID-19 positives who are fully-vaccinated (two doses) from ten to five days. The province will also no longer recommend PCR testing of asymptomatic individuals.

== 2022 ==
=== Winter (January–March) ===
Spread of Omicron variant contributed to record increases in cases, with Saskatchewan reporting at least 900 cases per-day from January 6 onward, and reporting over a thousand new cases for the first time on January 7. That day, Shahab warned that Omicron variant was causing an exponential increase in cases, and recommended that residents reduce their non-essential contacts for at least the next two to four weeks, and against non-essential travel between communities to protect against importation of infections. However, the province did not introduce binding public health orders to enforce these recommendations.

During a press briefing on January 12, Moe renewed the existing proof of vaccination and mask mandates through February 28, and once again did not impose any new public health orders, arguing that he didn't think it was "necessary" due to the province's hospitalizations, and that this was "in large part due to what Saskatchewan people are doing." Moe also commented upon an announcement by Quebecois counterpart François Legault that the province planned to begin charging a significant "contribution" to residents who have not received at least one vaccine dose, vowing that he would not implement such a scheme in Saskatchewan. A day later, Premier Moe revealed that he had tested positive for COVID-19 on a rapid test.

On January 21, Shahab stated that "several anomalies" in the province's reporting system had caused COVID-19 deaths and recoveries to be underreported since the start of 2022, resulting in a one-time increase of nine additional deaths that had not yet been accounted for. Even then, Moe still ruled out any additional public health orders, arguing that Saskatchewan still had "the lowest per-capita COVID-19 fatality rate in Canada for the month of January, below provinces that have introduced the strictest lockdown policies."

On January 24, Saskatchewan exceeded a total of 262 COVID-19-related hospitalizations (with nearly half being incidental); the province stated that it planned to re-locate some patients to rural hospitals in order to balance the load of Regina and Saskatoon's hospitals. Merriman stated that admissions had been "fairly stable", and "seem to be leveling out".

On January 27, after Moe stated the previous day that the province was considering easing restrictions soon, Merriman announced a number of changes to provincial COVID-19 protocol to reflect Omicron variant and the wide availability of rapid testing. The mandatory self-isolation period for COVID-19 positives was shortened to five days for those who are not fully-vaccinated, while close contacts of a positive case are no longer required to self-isolate, but will still be instructed to monitor for infection and symptoms using rapid tests.

On January 29, Moe issued a letter in support of Freedom Convoy 2022 (a protest against vaccine mandates for essential workers entering Canada via land crossings, whose organizers are largely linked to far-right political parties and organizations), also stating that he planned to lift the proof of vaccination mandate "in the not too-distant future" because the COVID-19 vaccines were not preventing people from being infected with or transmitting COVID-19. His remarks were met with criticism from doctors and other officials, while Saskatchewan NDP leader Ryan Meili accused Moe of spreading misinformation and declaring an intent to prematurely lift public health orders in order to appease "fringe groups". Moe clarified his comments on January 31, arguing that the present vaccines were not as effective at diminishing transmission of Omicron variant.

Alexander Wong of the Regina General Hospital argued that Moe's assessment of incidence rates between vaccinated and unvaccinated cases as being nearly equal was affected by a base rate fallacy (the percentage of the unvaccinated population testing positive still being higher than the percentage of the vaccinated population), but that Saskatchewan's case numbers were also skewed by the provincial policy of only recommending PCR testing of those who are symptomatic or have comorbidities.

On January 31, hospitalizations with COVID-19 in Saskatchewan hit an all-time high of 363, although 179 were classified as "incidental" (a patient having tested positive for COVID-19 but not originally admitted for it).

On February 3, the province announced that it will further phase out COVID-19 testing and reporting of cases effective immediately. PCR tests will only be available to those who are hospitalized or considered high-risk (including confirmatory testing for health care workers), and public testing sites will be closed effective February 7. In addition, the province will cease daily reports and statistics, and only publish a weekly summary. On February 8, as previously promised, Moe announced that the proof of vaccination mandate would be lifted effective February 14, and that the indoor mask mandate would be lifted by the end of the month.

=== Spring (April–June) ===
During question period on April 25, members of the Saskatchewan NDP accused the government of lacking transparency in its current response to COVID-19, and that it was "wreaking havoc in our health system and in our emergency rooms". Merriman denied that the province was "downplaying" the pandemic, and argued that "most of the challenges that we have in our healthcare system are human resource related", citing that the majority of surgeries in Regina and Saskatoon were occurring as scheduled.

== See also ==
- Timeline of the COVID-19 pandemic in Canada
