= List of cities in Alberta =

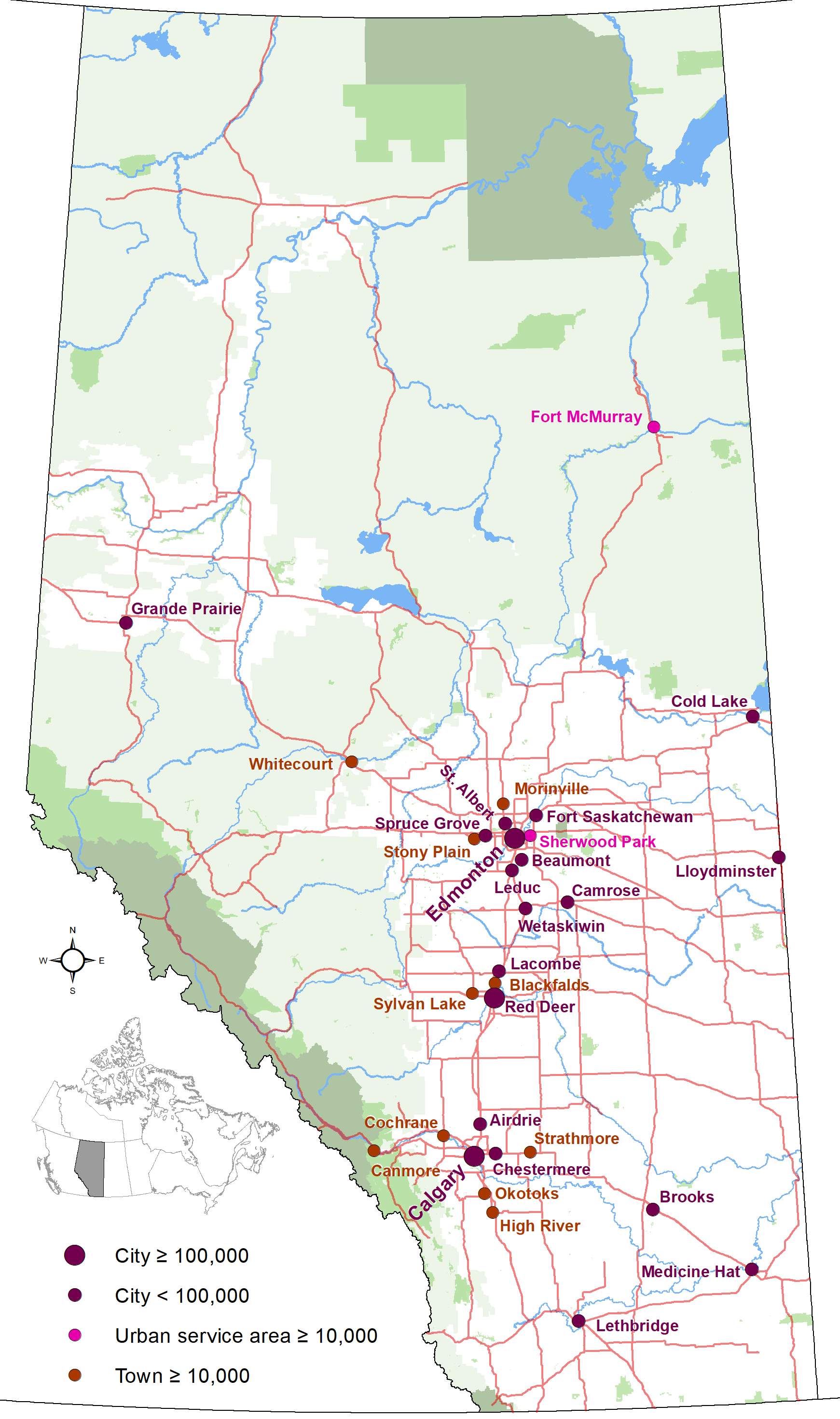
Distribution of Alberta's 19 cities, 2 urban service areas and 10 towns that are eligible for city status.

A city is the highest form of all incorporated urban municipality statuses used in the Canadian Province of Alberta. Alberta cities are created when communities with populations of at least 10,000 people, where a majority of their buildings are on parcels of land smaller than 1,850 m², apply to Alberta Municipal Affairs for city status under the authority of the Municipal Government Act. Applications for city status are approved via orders in council made by the lieutenant governor in Council under recommendation from the Minister of Municipal Affairs.

Alberta has 19 cities that had a cumulative population of 3,023,641 (not including the population in the Saskatchewan portion of Lloydminster) and an average population of 159,139 in the 2021 Census of Population. Alberta's largest and smallest cities are Calgary and Wetaskiwin, with populations of 1,306,784 and 12,594, respectively.

Beaumont became Alberta's 19th city on January 1, 2019.

157 elected city officials (19 mayors and 138 councillors) provide city governance throughout the province.

The highest density of cities in Alberta is found in the Edmonton Metropolitan Region (Beaumont, Edmonton, Fort Saskatchewan, Leduc, Spruce Grove and St. Albert). The Calgary Metropolitan Region has three cities (Airdrie, Calgary and Chestermere).

== Administration ==
Pursuant to Part 5, Division 1 of the Municipal Government Act (MGA), each municipality created under the authority of the MGA is governed by an elected council. As a requirement of the MGA, a city council consists of an odd number of councillors, one of which is the city's chief elected official (CEO) or mayor. A city council consists of seven councillors by default, but it can consist of a higher or lower odd number if council passes a bylaw altering its size (so long as it does not consist of fewer than three councillors).

City councils are governed by a mayor who is elected at large and an even number of councillors, resulting in a total odd number of councillors to avoid tie votes on council matters. For the councillors, a city council may establish ward systems, with councillors elected from wards that are defined as having roughly the same population (single-member districts or more than one member per district). Voters choose a councillor candidate running in the ward in which they live. If no ward system is in place, councillors are elected at-large like the mayor.

All city councillors are elected by popular vote under the provisions of the Local Authorities Election Act (LAEA). Mayoral or councillor candidates are required to be residents of their municipality for a minimum of six consecutive months prior to nomination day. The last municipal election for all cities, with the exception of the border city of Lloydminster, was held October 18, 2021. Lloydminster's elections are aligned with Saskatchewan's municipal election schedule.

Alberta Municipal Affairs, a ministry of the Cabinet of Alberta, is charged with coordination of all levels of local government.

Administrative duties of cities include public safety, local transit, roads, water service, drainage and waste collection, as well as coordination of infrastructure with provincial and regional authorities (including road construction, education, and health).

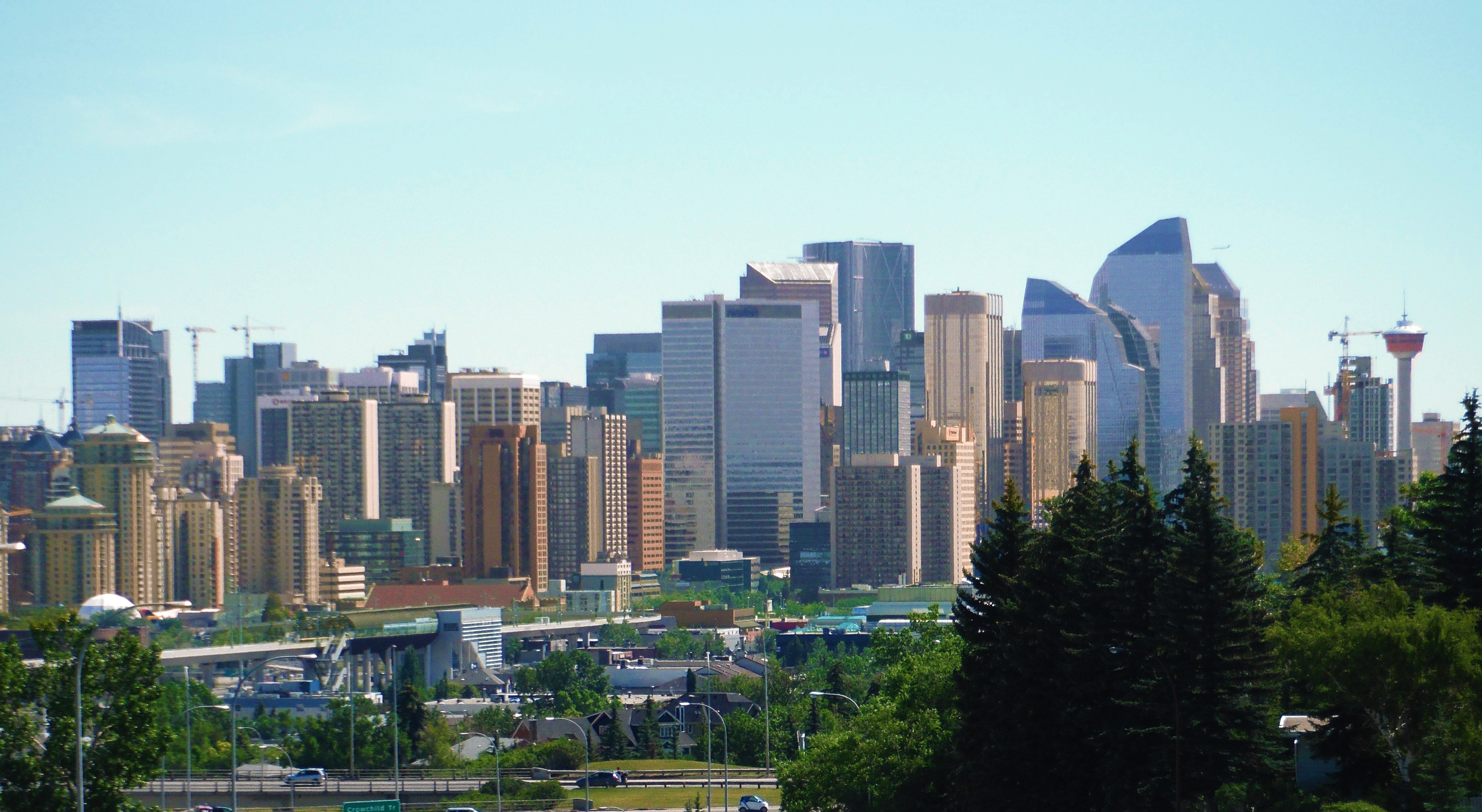
Calgary (2015)

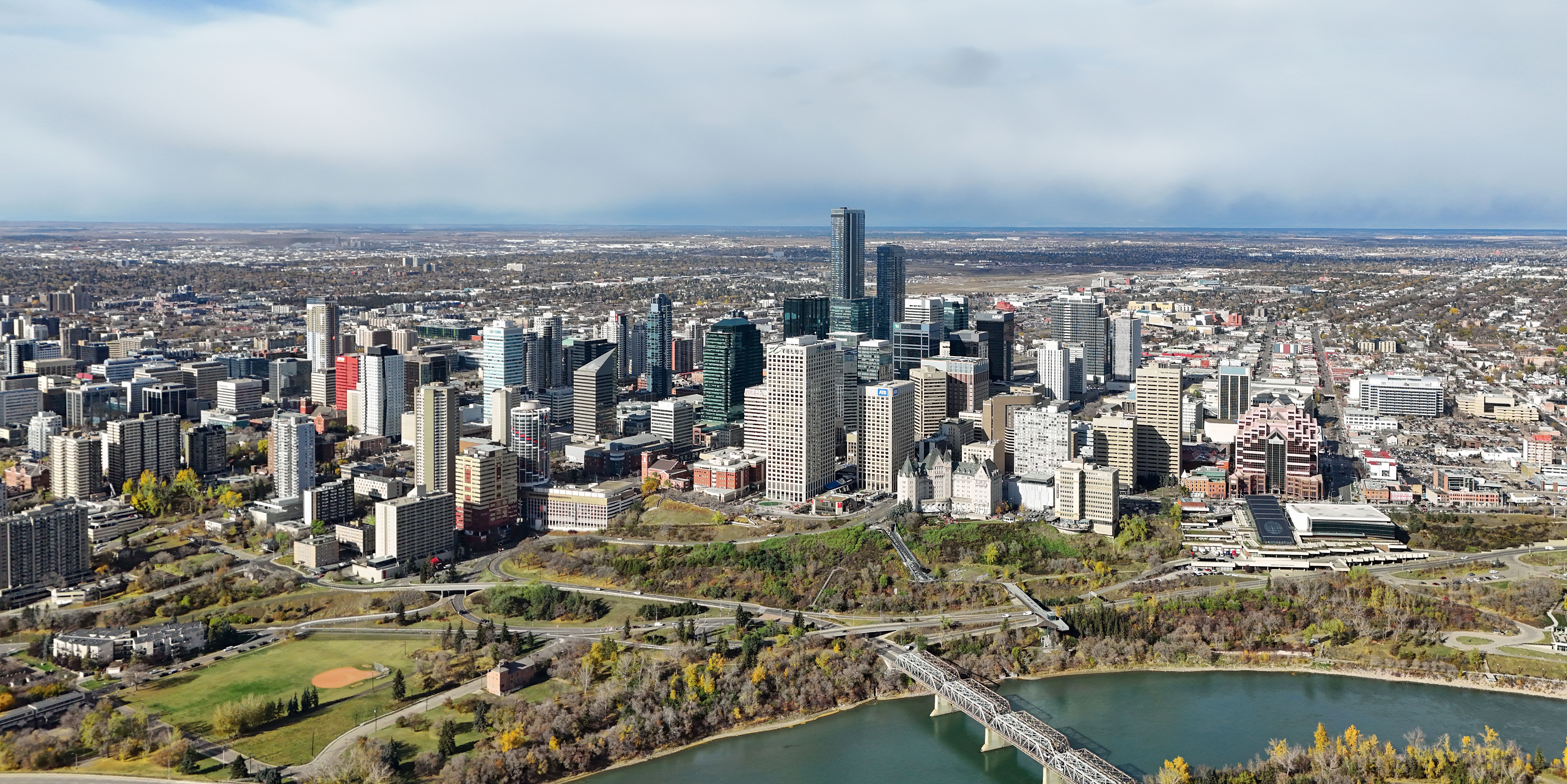
Edmonton (2024)

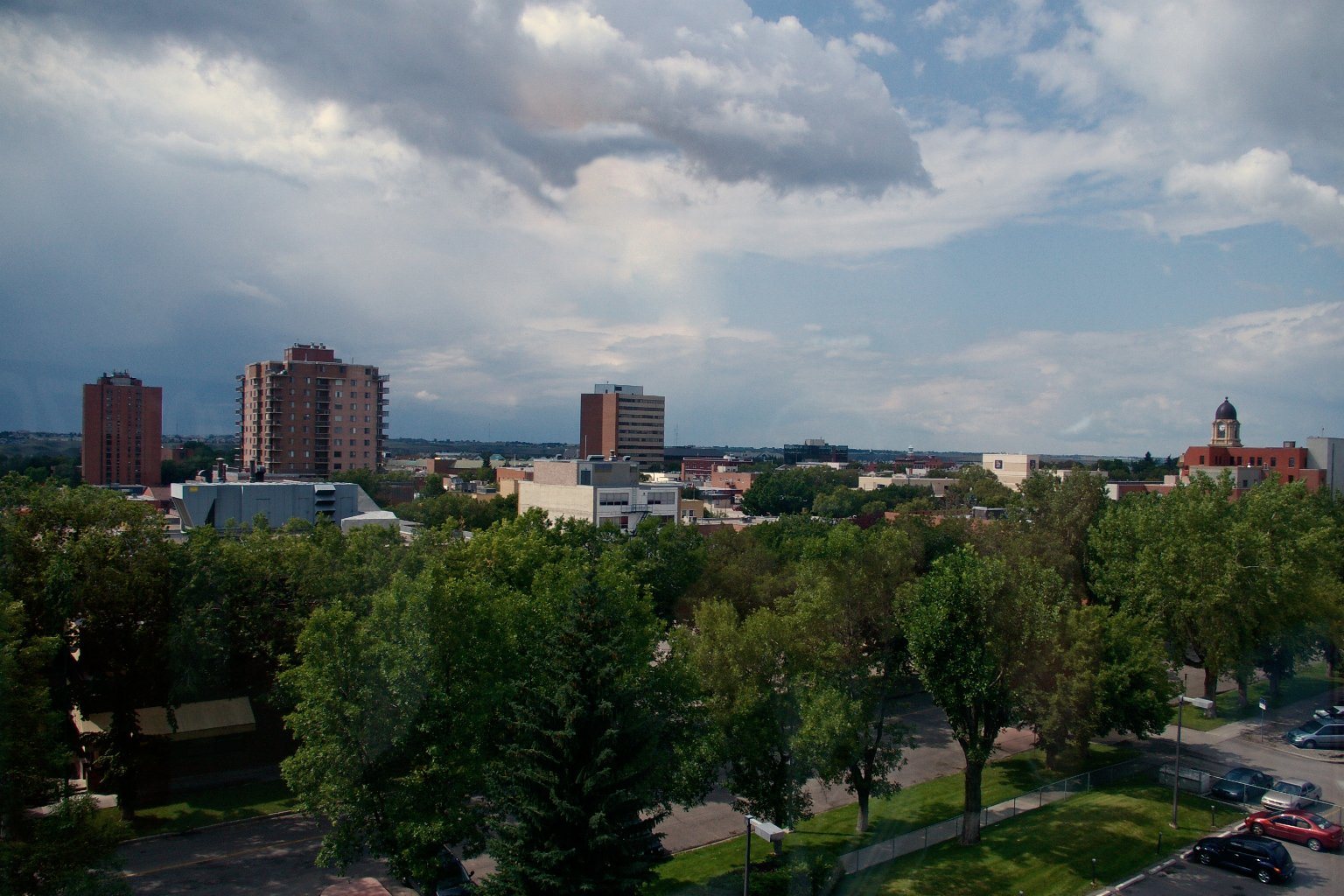
Lethbridge (2009)

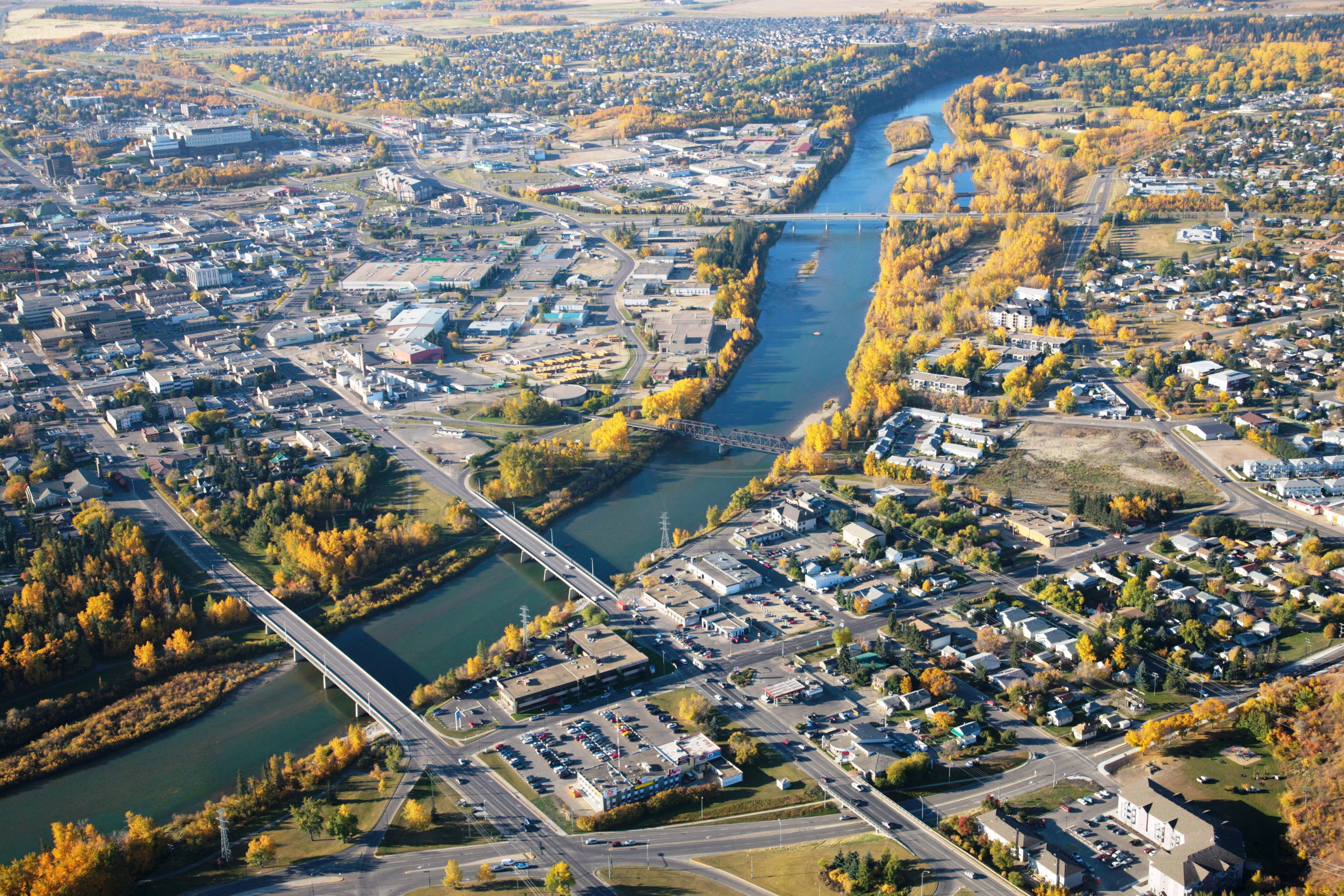
Red Deer (2008)

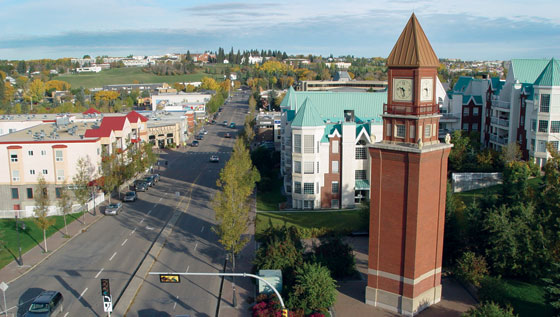
St. Albert (2009)

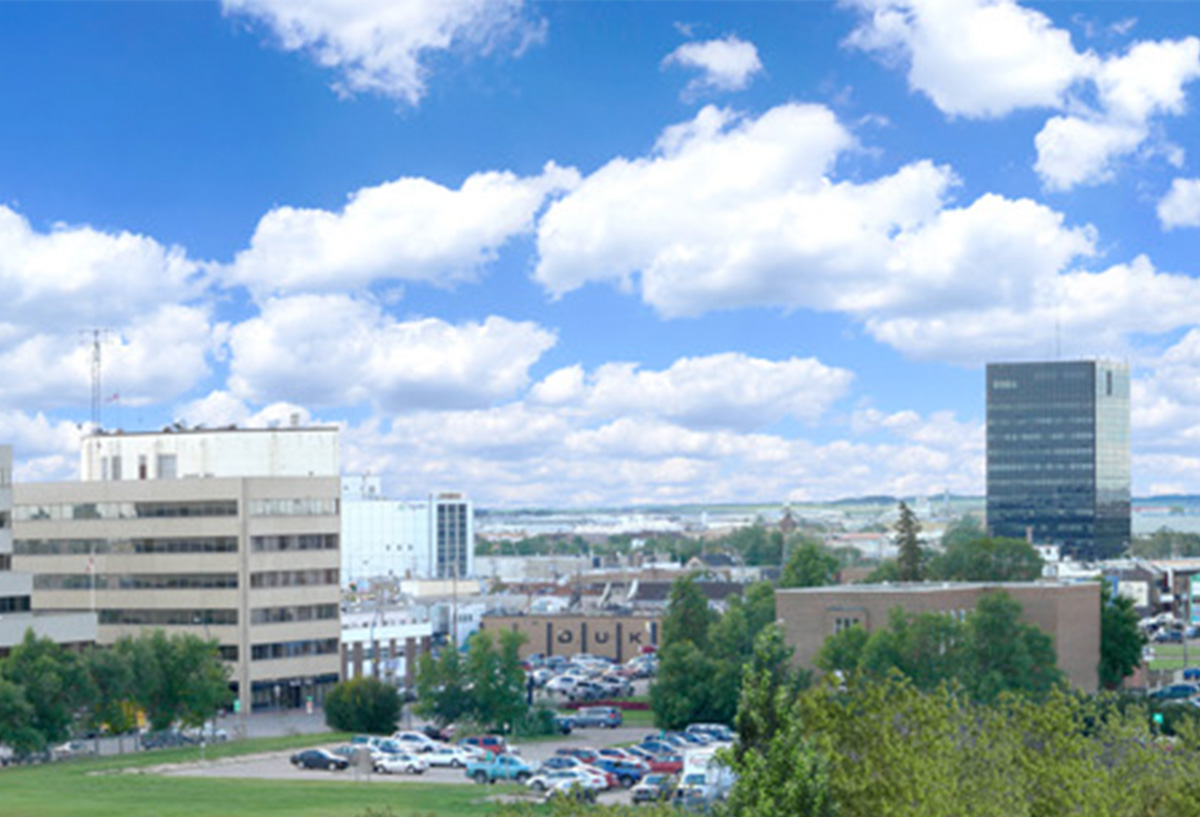
Grande Prairie (2014)

== List ==
List of cities in Alberta
Name	Region	Incorporation date (city)	Council size	2021 Census of Population				
Name	Region	Incorporation date (city)	Council size	Population (2021)	Population (2016)	Change	Land area (km^{2})	Population density (per km^{2})
Airdrie	Calgary Metro	January 1, 1985	7	74,100	61,581	+20.3%	84.39	878.1
Beaumont (Note: Beaumont is Alberta's newest city, incorporated on January 1, 2019.)	Edmonton Metro	January 1, 2019	7	20,888	17,457	+19.7%	24.70	845.7
Brooks (Note: Brooks is Alberta's smallest city by land area.)	Southern	September 1, 2005	7	14,924	14,451	+3.3%	18.21	819.5
Calgary (Note: Calgary is Canada's third-largest city, Alberta's largest city by both population and area, and was Alberta's first city, incorporated on January 1, 1894. The Calgary census metropolitan area (CMA) includes the cities of Airdrie, Calgary and Chestermere.)	Calgary Metro	January 1, 1894	15	1,306,784	1,239,220	+5.5%	820.62	1,592.4
Camrose	Central	January 1, 1955	9	18,772	18,742	+0.2%	41.67	450.5
Chestermere (Note: Chestermere was known as Chestermere Lake prior to March 1, 1993. It is the only city in Alberta to have previously hold summer village status.)	Calgary Metro	January 1, 2015	7	22,163	19,887	+11.4%	32.83	675.1
Cold Lake	Northern	October 1, 2000	7	15,661	14,976	+4.6%	66.61	235.1
Edmonton (Note: Edmonton is Canada's fifth-largest city and Alberta's capital. The Edmonton CMA includes the cities of Beaumont, Edmonton, Fort Saskatchewan, Leduc, Spruce Grove and St. Albert.)	Edmonton Metro	October 8, 1904	13	1,010,899	933,088	+8.3%	765.61	1,320.4
Fort Saskatchewan	Edmonton Metro	July 1, 1985	7	27,088	24,169	+12.1%	56.50	479.4
Grande Prairie	Northern	January 1, 1958	9	64,141	63,166	+1.5%	132.71	483.3
Lacombe	Central	September 5, 2010	7	13,396	13,057	+2.6%	20.59	650.6
Leduc	Edmonton Metro	September 1, 1983	7	34,094	29,993	+13.7%	42.25	807.0
Lethbridge	Southern	May 9, 1906	9	98,406	92,729	+6.1%	121.12	812.5
Lloydminster (part) (Note: The balance of Lloydminster is located within Saskatchewan.)	Central	January 1, 1958	7	19,739	19,645	+0.5%	23.98	823.1
Medicine Hat	Southern	May 9, 1906	9	63,271	63,260	0.0%	111.97	565.1
Red Deer	Central	March 25, 1913	9	100,844	100,418	+0.4%	104.34	966.5
Spruce Grove	Edmonton Metro	March 1, 1986	7	37,645	34,108	+10.4%	37.52	1,003.3
St. Albert	Edmonton Metro	January 1, 1977	7	68,232	65,589	+4.0%	47.84	1,426.3
Wetaskiwin (Note: Wetaskiwin is Alberta's smallest city by population.)	Central	May 9, 1906	7	12,594	12,655	−0.5%	18.75	671.7
Total cities	—	—	157	3,023,641	2,838,191	+6.5%	2,572.21	1,175.5

== Former cities ==
Alberta has recognized three other cities in its history. The Town of Strathcona incorporated as a city on March 15, 1907, and subsequently amalgamated with Edmonton on February 1, 1912. Fort McMurray was incorporated as a city on September 1, 1980, but reverted to its current urban service area form as a result of its amalgamation with Improvement District (I.D.) No. 143 on April 1, 1995. The Town of Drumheller was incorporated as a city on April 3, 1930 (well before the current requirement to have a population in excess of 10,000 people), and reverted to town status on January 1, 1998, when it amalgamated with the surrounding Municipal District of Badlands No. 7.

Former city	Incorporation date (city)	Previous status	Date of status change	Subsequent status
Drumheller	April 3, 1930	Town	January 1, 1998	Town
Fort McMurray	September 1, 1980	New town	April 1, 1995	Urban service area
Strathcona	March 15, 1907	Town	February 1, 1912	City amalgamation

== City status eligibility ==
There are currently nine towns – Blackfalds, Canmore, Cochrane, High River, Morinville, Okotoks, Stony Plain, Strathmore, and Sylvan Lake – that are eligible for city status having populations in excess of 10,000. In addition, the Town of Hinton has expressed interest in incorporating as a city once it surpasses 10,000 people. Its population in 2021 was 9,817.

Alberta's two urban service areas – Fort McMurray and Sherwood Park – are also eligible for city status. As noted above, Fort McMurray was previously incorporated as a city until it amalgamated with I.D. No. 143 on April 1, 1995. Meanwhile, Sherwood Park has remained a hamlet since its first residents arrived in 1955 and, in 1987, 89% of Strathcona County residents voted in favour of maintaining a single municipal government for Sherwood Park and the rural portion of the county.

Name	Region	Status	2021 Census of Population				
Name	Region	Status	Population (2021)	Population (2016)	Change (%)	Land area (km^{2})	Population density (per km^{2})
Blackfalds	Central	Town	10,470	9,328	+12.2%	16.58	631.4
Canmore	Rocky Mountains	Town	15,990	13,992	+14.3%	68.47	233.5
Cochrane	Calgary Metro	Town	32,199	25,853	+24.5%	31.58	1,019.5
Fort McMurray	Northern	Urban Service Area	68,002	67,123	+1.3%	52.17	1,303.5
High River	Calgary Metro	Town	14,324	13,594	+5.4%	22.19	645.4
Morinville	Edmonton Metro	Town	10,385	9,848	+5.5%	11.15	931.0
Okotoks	Calgary Metro	Town	30,405	29,016	+4.8%	38.55	788.7
Sherwood Park	Edmonton Metro	Urban Service Area	72,017	70,618	+2.0%	70.98	1,014.6
Stony Plain	Edmonton Metro	Town	17,993	17,189	+4.7%	35.45	507.6
Strathmore	Calgary Metro	Town	14,339	13,756	+4.2%	26.98	531.5
Sylvan Lake	Central	Town	15,995	14,816	+8.0%	23.09	692.8

== See also ==
- List of census divisions of Alberta
- List of communities in Alberta
- List of hamlets in Alberta
- List of municipal districts in Alberta
- List of municipalities in Alberta
- List of population centres in Alberta
- List of summer villages in Alberta
- List of towns in Alberta
- List of villages in Alberta
