= 2013 Regina wastewater plant financing referendum =

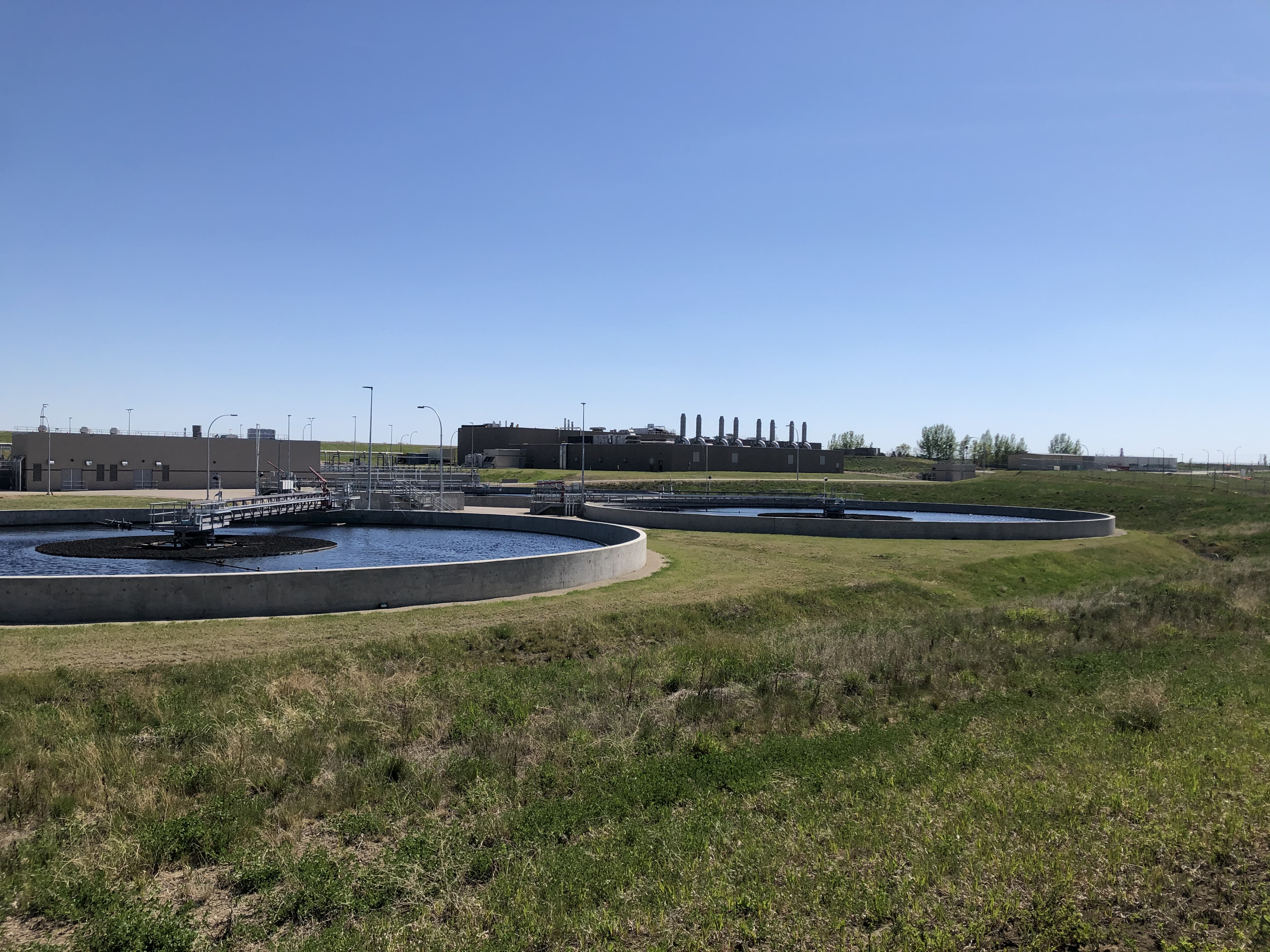
Regina wastewater treatment plant

A city-wide referendum on a new waste water treatment facility was held in Regina, Saskatchewan on September 25, 2013. The issue of the referendum was whether the facility would be financed through a Public-private partnership (P3) or through the design-bid-build (DBB) approach. The result was 57% against the DBB approach, and the treatment plant ended up being financed by a P3.

== Petition ==
The campaign to call this referendum started in response of a vote by the city council to finance the new $224-million Wastewater plant through a P3. A group called Regina Water Watch was created in opposition to this move, and started collecting signatures to force a referendum on the issue. According to the Saskatchewan Cities Act, a referendum must be held if 10% of the municipality's population sign a petition to hold it. By the end of June 2013, the group had amassed 24,000 signatures, above the 19,310 required by law. However, the city clerk's report judged the petition was insufficient to force the referendum after ruling that over 4000 of the signatures were invalid. The city council decided to vote for the referendum to be held anyway.

== Question ==
The Referendum question was the following:

"Be it resolved that the council of the City of Regina publicly finance, operate and maintain the new wastewater treatment plant for Regina through a traditional Design, Bid, Build (DBB) approach."

The question used the same wording that the original petition had proposed.

== Campaign ==
The "Yes" side was led by Regina Water Watch, group which self-described as "a citizens’ coalition who are concerned about the privatization of Regina's water and wastewater system". Their coalition "includes community activists, the Council of Canadians Regina Chapter, CUPE 21, Making Peace Vigil and Clean Green Regina". The campaign was also supported by the national Canadian Union of Public Employees (CUPE), which helped organize the group's first meeting. The leader of the campaign was Jim Holmes.

The "No" campaign was run by the City of Regina, and its main leader was Mayor Michael Fougere. The campaign was also supported by the Regina Chamber of Commerce. Federal finance minister Jim Flaherty expressed support for the goal of the campaign in an op-ed entitled "Why I’m giving Regina $58.5 million", in reference to his government's promise of funding part of the costs of the plant if the P3 option was selected.

A debate on the referendum issue was held between Fougere and Holmes on September 18, 2013.

=== Campaign finance ===
The City of Regina spent a total of $408,594.96 towards the "No" campaign. Other campaigns and third party groups were not required by law to reveal their campaign expenditures.

The Canadian Union of Public Employees gave significant funds to Regina Water Watch, including registering their domain name reginawaterwatch.com, and paying for the report "Flushing money away: Why the Privatization of Wastewater Treatment Plant is a bad idea", which estimates that a P3 funding scheme would cost the city $61 million more than a DBB. The Regina Chamber of Commerce also participated in the campaign by paying for numerous newspaper and TV ads advocating for the "No side".

During the campaign period, neither CUPE nor the Regina Chamber of Commerce disclosed how much they were spending on the campaign. After the campaign was over, it was revealed that CUPE had spent $180,000 on the "Yes" campaign while the Chamber had spent between $125,000 and $130,000 on the "No" campaign.

== Results ==
2013 Regina Referendum on Wastewater Plant Results
Answer	Votes	Percentage
Yes	21,025	42.88%
No	27,988	57.08%
Invalid	20	0,04%
Total	49,033	100%

=== Reaction ===
On the night the Results were posted, Regina Mayor Michael Fougere said ""I'll just say that the people have spoken and the people are always right. I'm very proud of the campaign we ran. I'm proud that people came out in large numbers to express their opinion on a very important issue for our city. I'm very proud of the results."

Jim Holmes reacted to the results by saying "I think we were more optimistic than that going into it. We were up against very tough competition. We were outspent and vilified and everything else."

== Aftermath ==
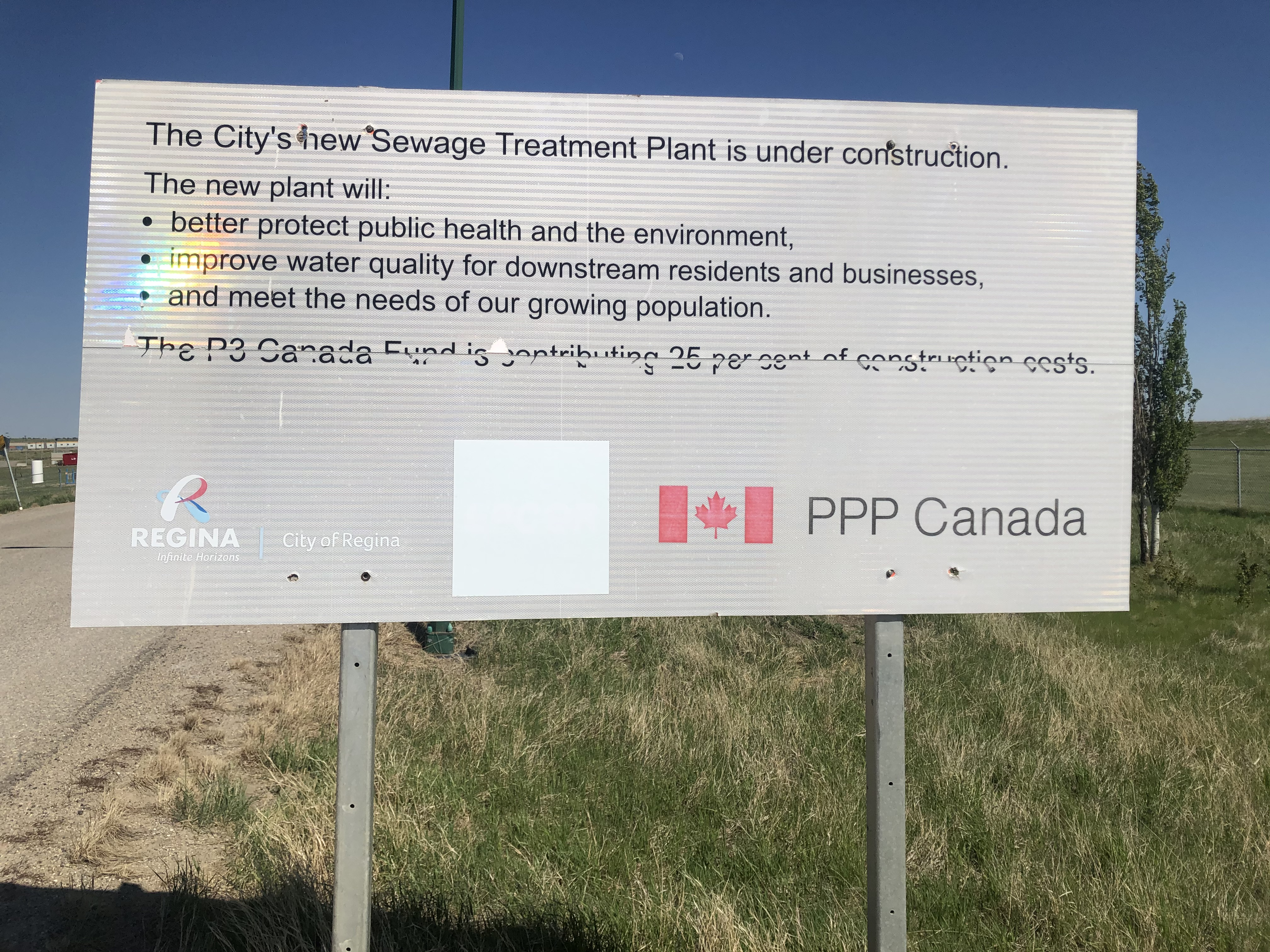
Sign at the entrance of the Regina Wastewater Treatment Plant

A P3 model funded the construction of the city's new wastewater treatment plant. In 2015, the Edmonton-based company Epcor was selected to design, build and operate the facility.

By 2016, the facility was nearly built, at a lower than forecasted cost, and it was deemed fully operational by 2018.
