= Regina City Council =

Governing body

Type
- Type: City Council

History
- Founded: December 1, 1883

Leadership
- Mayor of Regina: Chad Bachynski since November 18, 2024

Structure
- Seats: 11 (10 plus mayor)
- Length of term: 4 years

Elections
- Voting system: FPTP
- Last election: November 13, 2024
- Next election: November 2028

Motto
- Latin: Floreat Regina (Regina Flourishes)

Meeting place
- Henry Baker Hall, Main Floor, City Hall, 2476 Victoria Avenue, Regina, Saskatchewan

Website
- www.regina.ca

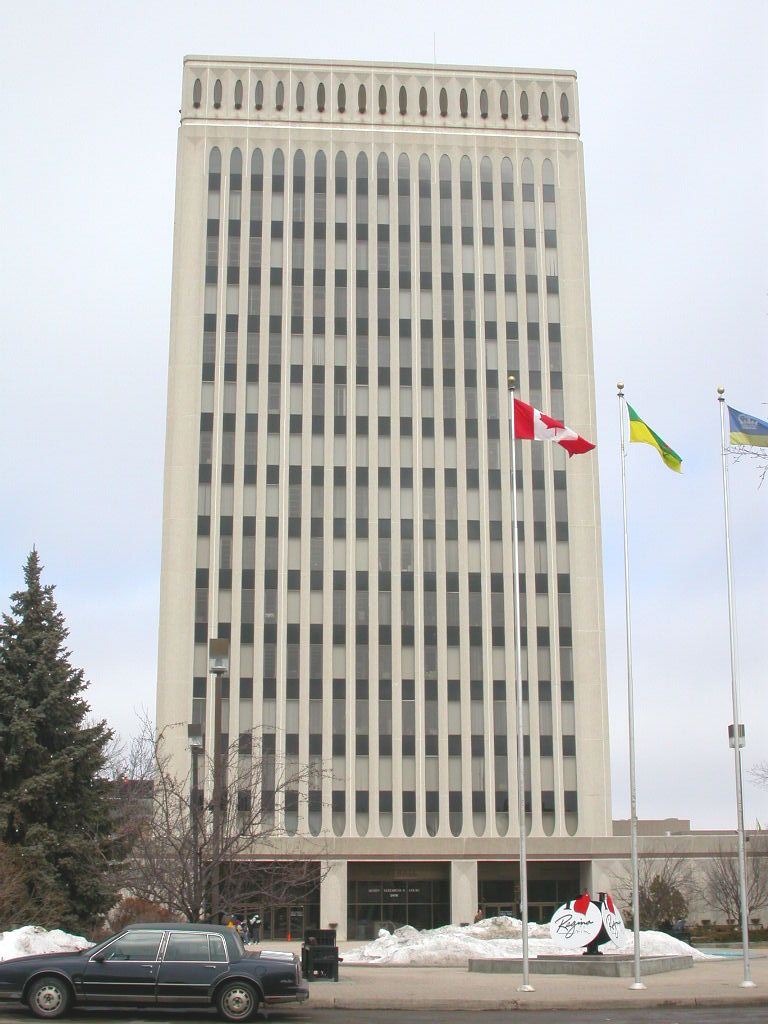
Regina City Hall - Queen Elizabeth II Court

Regina City Council is the governing body of Regina, the capital city of the central Canadian province of Saskatchewan. The council, which meets in Henry Baker Hall at Queen Elizabeth II Court, consists of the mayor, who is elected city-wide, and ten councillors representing ten wards throughout the city. The current council was elected to a four-year term on November 13, 2024.

== Council ==
Ward	Councillor	First elected	Preceded by	2024	Notes
Mayor	Chad Bachynski	2024	Sandra Masters	Elected with 31.5% of vote	Bachynski defeated one-term incumbent Sandra Masters for the mayoralty.
1	Dan Rashovich	2024	Cheryl Stadnichuk	Elected with 39.2% of vote	
2	George Tsiklis	2024	Bob Hawkins	Elected with 26.7% of vote	Tsiklis unseated three-term incumbent councillor Bob Hawkins after finishing second to Hawkins in Ward 2 in 2020.
3	David Froh	2024	Andrew Stevens	Elected with 76.3% of vote	
4	Mark Burton	2024	Lori Bresciani	Elected with 30.6% of vote	Burton succeeded former councillor Lori Besciani, who vacated the seat in order to run for mayor.
5	Sarah Turnbull	2024	John Findura	Elected with 34.9% of vote	
6	Victoria Flores	2024	Dan LeBlanc	Elected with 44.0% of vote	
7	Shobna Radons	2024	Terina Nelson	Elected with 34.0% of vote	Radons unseated one-term incumbent Terina Nelson in a re-match of the 2020 Ward 7 election.
8	Shanon Zachidniak	2020	Mike O'Donnell	Re-elected with 39.1% of vote	Zachidniak was elected with no incumbent running in the 2020 election. One of two incumbents re-elected in 2024.
9	Jason Mancinelli	2016	Terry Hincks	Re-elected with 30.3% of vote	One of two incumbents re-elected in 2024.
10	Clark Bezo	2024	Landon Mohl	Elected with 34.1% of vote	Bezo defeated former Ward 10 councillor Jerry Flegel, who vacated the seat in 2020 in order to run for mayor.

== See also ==
- List of mayors of Regina, Saskatchewan
- 2024 Saskatchewan municipal elections
