= Dan Rashovich =

Canadian football player (born 1960)

No. 74
- Position: Linebacker

Personal information
- Born: November 30, 1960 (age 65); Toronto, Ontario, Canada

Career information
- College: Simon Fraser University

Career history
- 1984: Ottawa Rough Riders
- 1985–1986: Toronto Argonauts
- 1987–1999: Saskatchewan Roughriders

Awards and highlights
- Grey Cup champion (1989)

Danilo "Dan" Rashovich (Danilo Rašović / Данило Рашовић) (born November 30, 1960) is a former linebacker who played sixteen seasons in the Canadian Football League (CFL), mainly for the Saskatchewan Roughriders.

Rashovich won a seat on Regina City Council in the 2024 municipal elections.
