= Michael Fougere =

American-Canadian politician

Mayor of Regina
- In office 5 November 2012 – 23 November 2020
- Preceded by: Pat Fiacco
- Succeeded by: Sandra Masters

City of Regina Councillor
- Constituency: Ward 4

Personal details
- Born: 1956 (age 69–70)? Farmington, Michigan, U.S.
- Citizenship: American and Canadian (dual)
- Occupation: Business executive

Michael Fougere is an American-Canadian politician who served as mayor of Regina, Saskatchewan. He was elected mayor on October 24, 2012 with 42 percent of the vote among nine candidates, running on a platform that included housing, infrastructure, regional economic development and continuing the Regina Revitalization Initiative. Prior to being elected as mayor of Regina, Fougere served as a city councillor in Ward 4 which covered the majority of the city's south-eastern neighbourhoods, being re-elected five times. He was first elected to city council in 1997. At the time he was the co-founder of the Association of Concerned Taxpayers.

Prior to his election as mayor, Fougere served on various civic boards such as the Wascana Centre Authority, Saskatchewan Urban Municipalities Association, Tourism Regina and the Regina Downtown Business Improvement District. During his first mayoral campaign, Fougere was the lone candidate that supported the funding arrangement between the city, the province and the Saskatchewan Roughriders for the construction of the new Mosaic Stadium, which opened in 2016.

Under his tenure, a city-wide referendum on a new waste water treatment facility was held on September 25, 2013. The issue of the referendum was whether the facility would be financed through a Public-private partnership (P3) or through the design-bid-build (DBB) approach. After initially opposing the call for a referendum, Fougere's administration campaigned in favour of a P3. The result was 57% against the DBB approach, and the treatment plant ended up being financed by a P3."

In January 2019, Fougere came out in support of an NHL game to be played at Mosaic Stadium. On November 9, 2020, Fougere was defeated in the city's municipal election by Sandra Masters.
