= Tourism Regina =

Tourism board of Regina, Saskatchewan

Tourism Regina is the tourism board of the city of Regina, Saskatchewan. It is a city-funded organization that has been operated by Regina Exhibition Association, Ltd. (REAL) since 2022.

== History ==
Tourism Regina was initially run by Economic Development Regina. In June 2022, the city passed a motion under which Regina Exhibition Association, Ltd. (REAL), which owns Regina's main sports venues and convention space (including Brandt Centre and Mosaic Stadium), would assume the operations of Tourism Regina. REAL would collaborate with local businesses and organizations to promote events occurring in the city.

On March 17, 2023, the organization was rebranded as Experience Regina; the branding originated from a 2008 music video that had been produced as a parody of tourism commercials, and popularized as a viral video by TSN SportsCentre hosts Jay Onrait and Dan O'Toole, and by Jimmy Fallon (who performed it in a "Do Not Play List" sketch on The Tonight Show). The rebranding received international media attention and proved controversial for its use of innuendos relating to the name of the city, with launch merchandise bearing slogans such as "The City that Rhymes with Fun" and "Show Us Your Regina".

On March 19, 2023, REAL CEO Tim Reid formally apologized for the campaign, and explained that "there needed to be more stringent guardrails put around messaging and the language that were used. There needed to be better approvals that were in place than there were. Ultimately, the strategy that we intended to launch versus the one that we did were two very different scenarios." Councillor Cheryl Stadnichuk considered the use of "sexist" slogans to be inapproriate due to the levels of sexual violence in Regina, which had increased by 16% in 2022. Following a city council meeting on March 23, 2023, Mayor Sandra Masters stated that the campaign "hurt and impacted people", and that "I think when offense and insult has been given and it’s corrected and accountability is taken, I'll go back to the board of directors in terms of making a decision with the deeper understanding of how things happened and what could be done." In April 2023, the organization reverted to the Tourism Regina name.

In July 2023, REAL released a report by an independent consultant on the rebranding—which it referred to as "the incident"—finding that it "happened in large measure because of a lack of managerial oversight, loose procedures, inadequate policy guidance and unavailable senior staff who were knowledgeable about what was expected." The organization stated that it would review Tourism Regina's organizational structure and establish an advisory board to ensure its operations are "reflective and inclusive of the citizens of our community".

In November 2023, REAL's board approved a motion to relinquish control of Tourism Regina and return it to the city. This motion was ratified by city council on November 8; REAL will assist in a transition period.
