= Sandra Masters =

Canadian politician

35th Mayor of Regina
- In office November 23, 2020 – November 18, 2024
- Preceded by: Michael Fougere
- Succeeded by: Chad Bachynski

Personal details
- Profession: Credit manager

Sandra Masters is a Canadian political figure who was the 35th mayor of Regina, Saskatchewan from 2020 to 2024. Masters was the first elected female mayor of either of Saskatchewan's major cities.

== Before politics ==
Masters moved to Regina in 1999 and worked for Richardson Agriculture as the manager of credit for the Prairie Provinces. From 2014 she served on the board of Regina Exhibition Association Limited (REAL), but resigned her role as board chair in order to run for mayor.

== Political career ==
=== Mayor of Regina ===
Masters launched her campaign for Regina's mayoralty on September 16, 2020. The campaign focused on developing an anti-poverty strategy for the city, supporting the Regina Police Service and local businesses, and reducing city administration costs by 15%. Masters won the election, unseating two-term incumbent mayor Michael Fougere in a nine-person race with 46.4 per cent of the vote. This made Masters the first person since Pat Fiacco to become mayor of Regina with no previous city council experience. She was sworn in as mayor on November 23, 2020.

As Mayor, Masters became a backer of Regina's catalyst committee, which was tasked with overseeing the potential development of five downtown revitalization projects worth nearly $500 million, including new baseball, soccer, and aquatic facilities, a new event centre, and a modernized central library. In 2022, Masters hired the city's first female manager, Niki Anderson, following the dismissal of Chris Holden. However, by the mid-way point of her mayoral term, Masters found herself leading a divided city council that saw in-fighting, persistent formal complaints against councillor Terina Nelson, and a fractious debate over affordability and a plan to address homelessness. The latter included councillor Andrew Stevens being part of a lawsuit, filed by lawyer and fellow councillor Dan LeBlanc, against Anderson over budgetary procedural matters. Masters labelled the lawsuit as sexist and was accused of retaliating against LeBlanc by pushing for his removal as the City Council representative on the board of directors of Community and Social Impact Regina. After LeBlanc's removal from that board, over 100 citizens submitted a letter to Masters condemning her response to the controversy. In September 2023, after continued debate over the homelessness issue, Masters revealed continued division on council when she stated that she did not trust Stevens, Leblanc, or councillors Shannon Zachidniak or Cheryl Stadnichuk, who all voted in favour of a motion to declare a homelessness emergency in Regina.

In December 2022, Masters stated that her accomplishments to that point in time centred on bolstering local pride in Regina. However, in March 2023 Masters courted controversy as part of a failed bid to re-brand Tourism Regina as "Experience Regina," a campaign that was ultimately accused of promoting the city through the use of sexual innuendo. Although Masters criticized the campaign in the wake of the controversy, it was reported that her office ordered merchandise from the campaign, including a sweatshirt branded with the controversial phrase, "the city that rhymes with fun."

In March 2024, Masters confirmed that she would seek a second term as mayor in that fall's election. Masters was ultimately joined in a crowded field by ten other candidates. In the November election, she was defeated by political newcomer Chad Bachynski, ultimately finishing in third place.

=== Civil service ===
In November 2025, Masters was hired by the office of Saskatchewan Premier Scott Moe. As a deputy chief of staff, the hiring made Masters the communications lead for the Saskatchewan Party government.

== Election results ==
2024 Regina mayoral election
Candidate	Votes	%
Chad Bachynski	16,508	31.50
Lori Bresciani	13,041	24.89
Sandra Masters (X)	12,114	23.12
Bill Pratt	6,362	12.14
7 other candidates	4,377	8.35
Total	52,402	100.00

2020 Regina mayoral election
Candidate	Votes	%
Sandra Masters	19,015	46.4
Michael Fougere (X)	14,649	35.7
Jerry Flegel	3,240	7.9
Tony Fiacco	1,514	3.7
5 other candidates	2,583	6.3
Total	41,001	100.00

== See also ==
- List of mayors of Regina, Saskatchewan
