= Chad Bachynski =

Canadian politician

His Worship Chad Bachynski
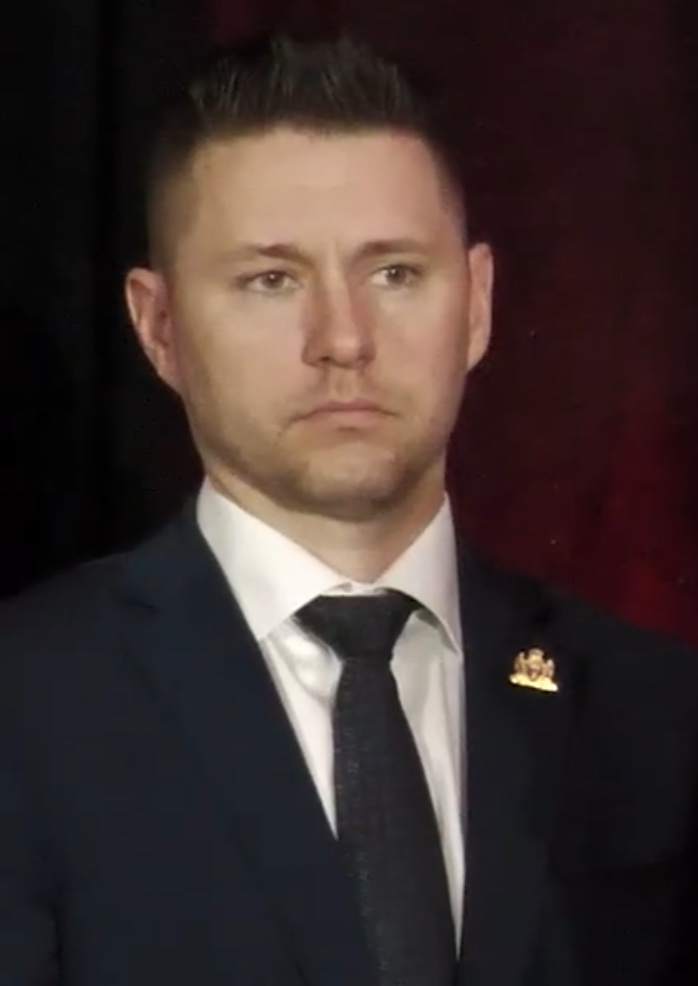

36th Mayor of Regina
- Incumbent
- Assumed office November 18, 2024
- Preceded by: Sandra Masters

Personal details
- Education: University of Saskatchewan
- Occupation: Project manager
- Profession: Mechanical engineer

Chad Bachynski is a Canadian politician who is currently the mayor of Regina, Saskatchewan. Bachynski was elected in the 2024 Saskatchewan municipal elections and is Regina's 36th mayor.

== Before politics ==
Prior to running for office, Bachynski, who calls Regina his hometown, worked as a mechanical engineer and as a manager at SaskEnergy. He earned a bachelor's degree from the University of Saskatchewan in 2008, and worked in private industry in Regina before moving to SaskEnergy, originally as a pipeline engineer. Bachynski was also at one time a DJ.

== Political career ==
Bachynski launched his campaign for the Regina mayoralty in September 2024, entering the race to challenge incumbent Sandra Masters. His campaign focused on infrastructure development, getting better value for taxation, and public safety.

On November 13, 2024, Bachynski was elected mayor over ten other candidates, receiving approximately 32% of the vote city-wide. On November 18, Bachynski was sworn in as the 36th mayor of Regina.

In December 2024, Bachynski led the new council in approving more than $200 million in pre-budget capital spending. At the end of 2024, Bachynski cited addressing perceived dysfunction at City Hall and the city's growing infrastructure deficit as key priorities. On the latter, Bachynski suggested a need to "intensify" the city and limit sprawl in order to increase efficiency in taxation and infrastructure.

== Election results ==
2024 Regina mayoral election
Candidate	Votes	%
Chad Bachynski	16,508	31.50
Lori Bresciani	13,041	24.89
Sandra Masters (X)	12,114	23.12
Bill Pratt	6,362	12.14
7 other candidates	4,377	8.35
Total	52,402	100.00

== See also ==
- List of mayors of Regina, Saskatchewan
