= 2024 Saskatchewan municipal elections =

Elections in Canada

- Various dates

Municipal elections in Saskatchewan were held on various dates throughout 2024. Voters in the Canadian province of Saskatchewan elected the mayors and councillors in all resort villages on July 27; the mayors and councillors in all northern municipalities on various dates throughout the fall; and the mayors and councillors in all cities, towns, villages and the reeves and odd-numbered division councillors in all rural municipalities on November 13.

Listed below are selected municipal mayoral and city councillor races across the province. An "(X)" is listed next to the incumbent's name, where it applies.

== Election dates ==
Saskatchewan has held its municipal elections in the current fixed schedule since The Local Government Election Act, 2014. Municipal elections take place every four years starting in 2016 on the last Saturday in July for resort villages, on various dates in the fall for northern municipalities, and on the 2nd Wednesday in November for cities, towns, villages, and rural municipalities.

In August 2021, Saskatchewan's Chief Electoral Officer Michael Boda proposed changing election dates for cities, towns, villages, and rural municipalities in the province in 2024, given that the provincial and municipal elections were, as in 2020, schedule to take place within three weeks of each other. Boda recommended changing the 2024 municipal election date from November to May. However, the provincial government declined to make changes, opting to keep the municipal election date as November 13, 2024.

== Resort villages ==
Elections in Saskatchewan’s resort villages were held on July 27.

== Northern municipalities ==
Elections in Saskatchewan’s northern municipalities were held on various dates throughout the fall, as provincial legislation allows these municipalities to each schedule their elections on a variety of date options.

== Cities, towns, and villages ==
Elections in Saskatchewan’s cities, towns, and villages were held on November 13, 2024.

=== Estevan ===
==== Mayor ====
Mayor
Mayoral candidate	Vote	%
Anthony Sernick	1,254	46.81
Rebecca Foord	1,108	41.36
Zacch Vandenhurk	317	11.83

==== Council ====
Council
Candidate	Vote	%	Elected
Shelly Veroba (X)	2,175	80.71	✓
Kirsten Walliser (X)	1,992	73.91	✓
Brian Johnson	1,762	59.43	✓
Dave Elliot	1,464	54.32	✓
Tom Mauss	1,233	45.75	✓
Matthew Dubowski	1,048	38.89	✓
Robin Wog	995	36.92	
Stephen Daniel	919	34.10	
Rhyan Hagel	783	29.05	
Kevin Andrew	629	23.34	

(Elected by plurality block voting where each voter casts up to six votes. Per cent is portion of voters who voted, not percentage of votes cast.)

==== Plebiscite ====
Rink Plebiscite
Choice	Votes	%
No	1,538	59.52
Yes	1,046	40.48

=== Humboldt ===
Mayoral candidate	Vote	%
Rob Muench	988	50.74
Andrew Breker	777	39.91
Harley Bentley	182	9.35

=== Lloydminster ===
Mayoral candidate	Vote	%
Gerald S. Aalbers (X)	Acclaimed	

=== Martensville ===
Mayoral candidate	Vote	%
Kent Muench (X)	966	84.22
Travis Sorenson	181	15.78

=== Meadow Lake ===
Mayoral candidate	Vote	%
Merlin Seymour (X)	Acclaimed	

=== Melfort ===
Mayoral candidate	Vote	%
Glenn George (X)	Acclaimed	

=== Moose Jaw ===
Mayoral candidate	Vote	%
James Murdock	5,437	63.65
Crystal Froese	1,439	16.85
Clive Tolley (X)	601	7.04
Mike Simpkins	571	6.68
Kim Robinson	494	5.78

=== North Battleford ===
Mayoral candidate	Vote	%
Kelli Hawtin	1,591	57.29
Terry Caldwell	843	30.36
Wayne Baptiste (Semaganis)	343	12.35

=== Prince Albert ===
2024 Prince Albert municipal election
- Mayoral election
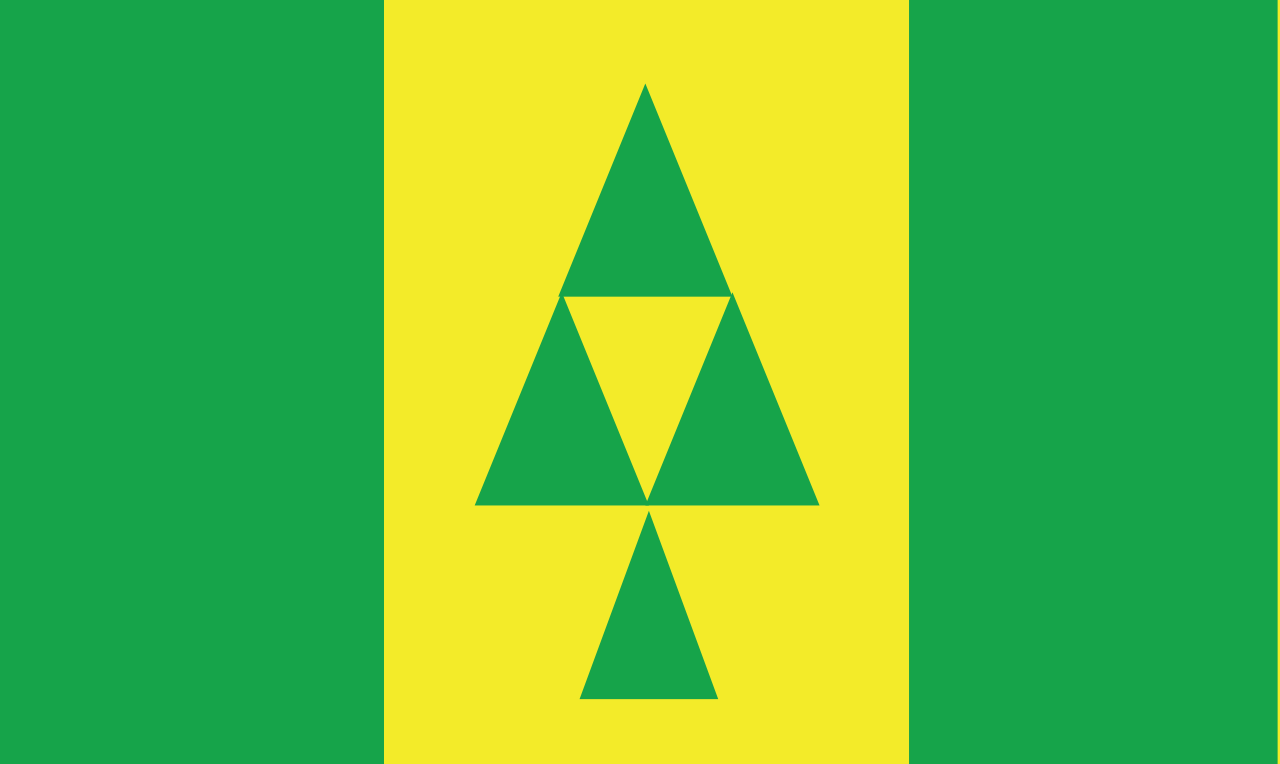
- 13 November 2024
Nominee	Bill Powalinsky	Greg Dionne	Brittany Marie Smith
Popular vote	4,424	2,923	867
Percentage	53.86%	35.59%	10.56%
Mayor before election
Greg Dionne
Elected mayor
Bill Powalinsky

==== Mayor ====
Mayoral candidate	Vote	%
Bill Powalinsky	4,424	53.86
Greg Dionne (X)	2,923	35.59
Brittany Marie Smith	867	10.56

==== Council ====
Candidate	Vote	%
Ward 1
Daniel Brown	344	56.48
Larry Vandale	265	43.51
Ward 2
Troy Parenteau	574	57.45
Meghan Mayer	425	42.54
Ward 3
Tony Head	Acclaimed	
Ward 4
Bryce Laewetz	707	62.45
Perry Trusty	475	41.69
Ward 5
Stephen Ring	735	57.69
Shaun Harris	539	42.30
Ward 6
Blake Edwards	Acclaimed	
Ward 7
Dawn Kilmer	492	56.55
Dennis J. Nowoselsky	378	43.44
Ward 8
Darren Solomon	Acclaimed	

=== Regina ===
2024 Regina municipal election
- Mayoral election
- 13 November 2024
Nominee	Chad Bachynski	Lori Bresciani
Popular vote	16,508	13,041
Percentage	31.50%	24.89%
Nominee	Sandra Masters	Bill Pratt
Popular vote	12,114	6,362
Percentage	23.12%	12.14%
Mayor before election
Sandra Masters
Elected mayor
Chad Bachynski

Ward boundaries in Regina changed.

==== Mayor ====
Mayoral candidate	Vote	%
Chad Bachynski	16,508	31.50
Lori Bresciani	13,041	24.89
Sandra Masters (X)	12,114	23.12
Bill Pratt	6,362	12.14
Bevann Fox	1,226	2.34
Rod Williams	1,163	2.22
Bob Pearce	1,034	1.97
Shawn Sparvier	313	0.60
Melina Bushenlonga	260	0.50
Kevin Kardash	241	0.46
Nathaniel Hewton	140	0.27

==== Council ====
Candidate	Vote	%
Ward 1
Dan Rashovich	2,286	39.19
Joanne Crofford	2,251	38.59
Jessie Morris	1,219	20.90
Talha Khan	77	1.32
Ward 2
George Tsiklis	1,365	26.74
Bob Hawkins (X)	1,338	26.21
André Magnan	1,114	21.83
Chidi Igwe	809	15.85
Zaid Hameed	205	4.02
Sanket Patel	171	3.35
Anamul Akanda	102	2.00
Ward 3
David Froh	4,300	76.31
Barry Wilkie	1,145	20.32
Faaiq Tanveer	190	3.37
Ward 4
Mark Burton	1,650	30.61
Glen Geiger	1,425	26.43
Kofo Oni	685	12.71
Deb Nyczai	680	12.61
Charles Umeh	494	9.16
Danish Hasan	253	4.69
Balvir Bhathal	204	3.78
Ward 5
Sarah Turnbull	2,061	34.90
Grant Jakubowski	1,867	31.61
Marianne Mucz	1,127	19.08
Leticia Oystrick	579	9.90
Dharmesh Dave	163	2.76
Shifaan Shafi	109	1.85
Ward 6
Victoria Flores	1,532	44.02
Glenn Douglas	803	23.07
David Whitrow	551	15.83
Corey Liebrecht	239	6.87
Fawaz Adegoke	231	6.64
Julian Levy	124	3.56
Ward 7
Shobna Radons	1,522	34.00
Terina Nelson (X)	1,344	30.03
John Gross	1,107	24.73
Abdi Gure	503	11.24
Ward 8
Shanon Zachidniak (X)	1,388	39.14
Alex Tkach	917	25.86
Shannon Orell-Bast	700	19.74
Cory Terry	392	11.05
Mohammad Zafar	149	4.20
Ward 9
Jason Mancinelli (X)	1,987	30.31
Tanis Wilder	1,841	28.09
Jeff Soroka	1,733	26.44
Reid Hill	884	13.49
Saad Siddiqui	110	1.68
Ward 10
Clark Bezo	1,957	34.09
Jerry Flegel	1,825	31.79
Chris Simmie	1,265	22.03
Anita Adefuye	567	9.88
Umer Syed	127	2.21

=== Saskatoon ===
2024 Saskatoon municipal election
- Mayoral election
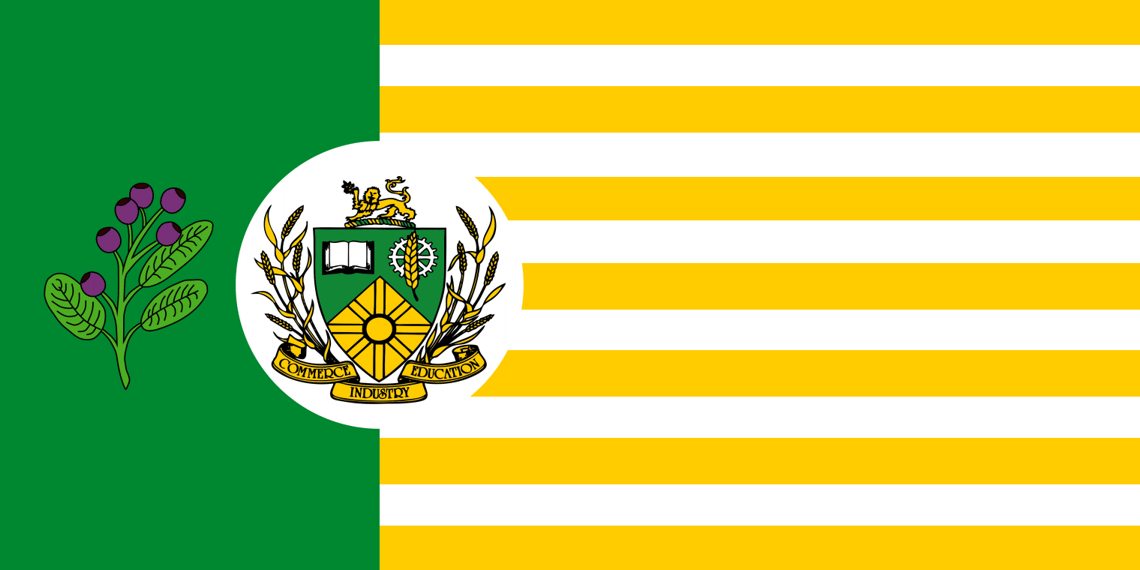
- 13 November 2024
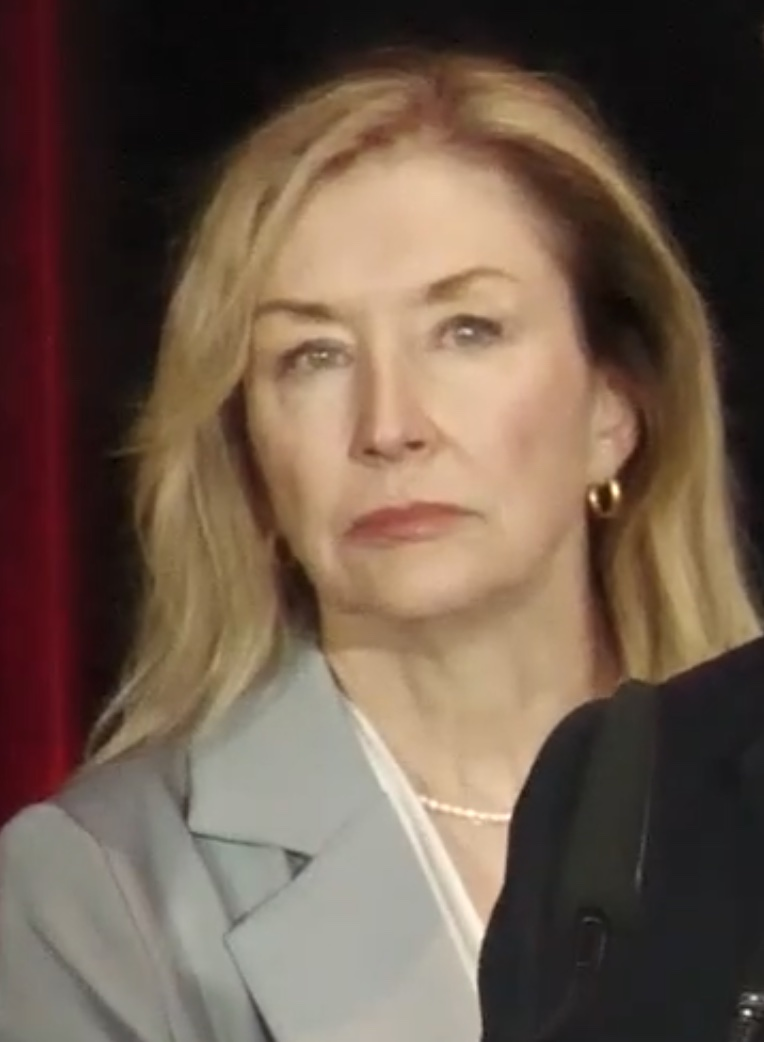

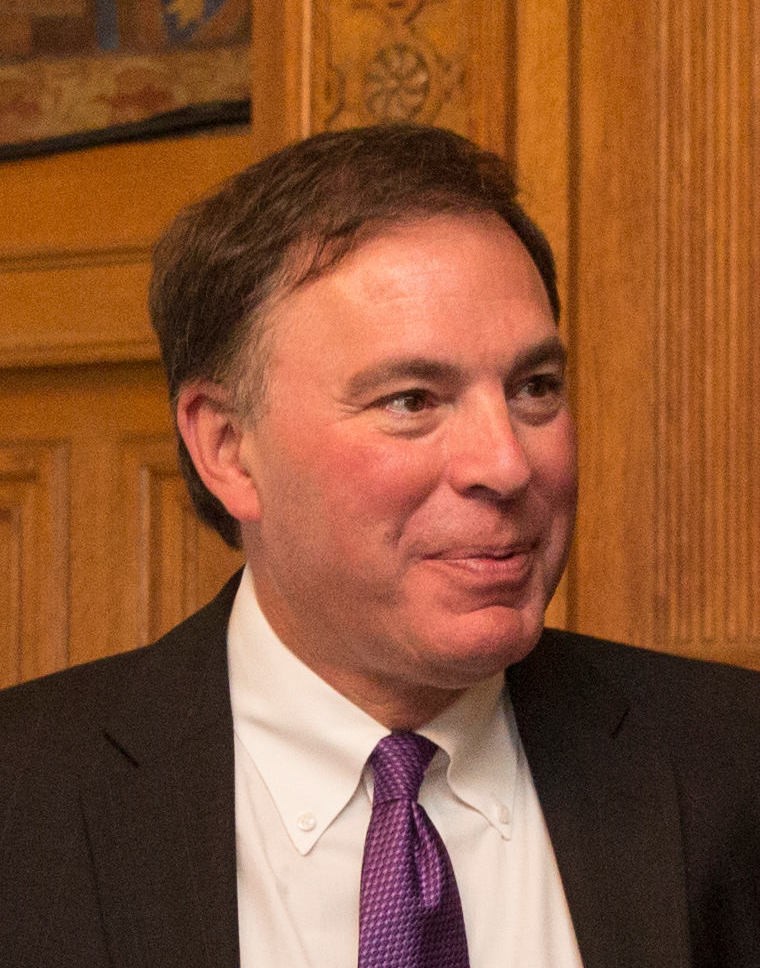
Nominee	Cynthia Block	Gordon Wyant
Popular vote	30,412	20,259
Percentage	44.67%	29.76%
	DA	CT
Nominee	Don Atchison	Cary Tarasoff
Popular vote	10,460	6,386
Percentage	15.36%	9.38%
Mayor before election
Charlie Clark
Elected mayor
Cynthia Block

Incumbent mayor Charlie Clark announced in January 2024 that he would not run for a third term, making this Saskatoon's first election without an incumbent mayor since 1988.

==== Mayor ====
Mayoral candidate	Vote	%
Cynthia Block	30,412	44.67
Gordon Wyant	20,259	29.76
Don Atchison	10,460	15.36
Cary Tarasoff	6,386	9.38
Mike Harder	568	0.83

==== Council ====
Candidate	Vote	%
Ward 1
Kathryn MacDonald	1,808	32.27
Kevin Boychuk	1,756	31.35
Darren Hill (X)	1,453	25.94
Russell Nadin	439	7.84
Dallas Burnett	146	2.61
Ward 2
Senos Timon	1,592	31.86
Jean Beliveau	1,230	24.61
Franklin Arthurs	869	17.39
Karen Kobussen	523	10.47
Fraser Kent	489	9.79
Janna Horn	294	5.88
Ward 3
Robert Pearce	2,553	50.29
Mike San Miguel	2,242	44.16
Devyn Gregoire	282	5.55
Ward 4
Troy Davies (X)	3,144	62.83
Courtney Saliken	1,233	24.64
Numaan Shafqat	627	12.53
Ward 5
Randy Donauer (X)	3,888	47.51
Kyla Kitzul	1,905	23.28
David Prokopchuk	1,208	14.76
Tyler Knihnitski	725	8.86
Nick Prytula	458	5.60
Ward 6
Jasmin Parker	3,456	39.99
Jon Naylor	1,930	22.33
Tony Bassett	1,378	15.94
Terry Alm	1,256	14.53
Terry Hokness	623	7.21
Ward 7
Holly Kelleher	2,672	39.84
Justin Wiens	1,835	27.36
Jamie Kirkpatrick	1,622	24.19
Edward Agbai	577	8.60
Ward 8
Scott Ford	2,203	26.45
Henry Tsz Lok Chan	1,642	19.72
Malvina Rapko	1,548	18.59
Peggy Schmeiser	1,392	16.71
Ron Mantyka	832	9.99
Darren Abrey	270	3.24
Kevin Zarycki	233	2.80
Prathamesh Kale	208	2.50
Ward 9
Bev Dubois (X)	Acclaimed	
Ward 10
Zach Jeffries (X)	Acclaimed	

=== Swift Current ===
Mayoral candidate	Vote	%
Al Bridal (X)	Acclaimed	

=== Warman ===
Mayoral candidate	Vote	%
Gary Philipchuk (X)	Acclaimed	

=== Weyburn ===
Mayoral candidate	Vote	%
Jeff Richards	1,755	66.70
Marcel Roy (X)	855	35.20
Bruce Croft	21	0.80

=== Yorkton ===
Mayoral candidate	Vote	%
Aaron Kienle	2,438	62.29
Mitch Hippsley (X)	1,476	37.71

== Rural municipalities ==
Elections in Saskatchewan’s rural municipalities were held on November 13 to elect reeves and odd-numbered division councillors.

=== Corman Park No. 344 ===
Reeve candidate	Vote	%
Joe Hargrave	Acclaimed	

== See also ==
- List of municipal elections in Saskatchewan
