= 2020 Saskatchewan municipal elections =

Elections in Canada

- Various dates

Municipal elections in Saskatchewan were held on various dates throughout 2020. Voters in the Canadian province of Saskatchewanelected the mayors and councillors in all resort villages on August 29; the mayors and councillors in all northern municipalities on various dates throughout the fall; and the mayors and councillors in all cities, towns, villages and the reeves and odd-numbered division councillors in all rural municipalities on November 9.

Listed below are selected municipal mayoral and city councillor races across the province. An "(X)" is listed next to the incumbent's name, where it applies.

== Election dates ==
Saskatchewan has held its municipal elections in the current fixed schedule since The Local Government Election Act, 2014. Municipal elections take place every four years starting in 2016 on the last Saturday in July for resort villages, on various dates in the fall for northern municipalities, and on the 2nd Wednesday in November for cities, towns, villages, and rural municipalities.

=== Changes ===
Elections in resort villages were delayed due to the COVID-19 pandemic.

Elections in Saskatoon, Swift Current and Maple Creek were delayed or deferred due to a snowstorm.

== Resort villages ==
Elections in Saskatchewan’s resort villages were held on August 29. Elections in resort villages were rescheduled from the typical last Saturday in July date this year due to the COVID-19 pandemic.

== Northern municipalities ==
Elections in Saskatchewan’s northern municipalities were held on various dates throughout the fall, as provincial legislation allows these municipalities to each schedule their elections on a variety of date options.

== Cities, towns, and villages ==
Elections in Saskatchewan’s cities, towns, and villages were held on November 9, 2020.

=== Balgonie ===
Mayoral candidate	Vote	%
Frank Thauberger (X)	Acclaimed	

=== Estevan ===
Mayoral candidate	Vote	%
Roy Ludwig (X)	1,632	70.53
Ray Walton	682	29.47

=== Humboldt ===
Mayoral candidate	Vote	%
Michael Behiel	760	52.81
Lorne Pratchler	549	38.15
Harley Bentley	130	9.03

=== Lloydminster ===
Mayoral candidate	Vote	%
Gerald S. Aalbers (X)	Acclaimed	

=== Martensville ===
Mayoral candidate	Vote	%
Kent Muench (X)	Acclaimed	

=== Meadow Lake ===
Mayoral candidate	Vote	%
Merlin Seymour (X)	Acclaimed	

=== Melfort ===
Mayoral candidate	Vote	%
Glenn George	583	50.22
Rick Lang (X)	578	49.78

=== Moose Jaw ===
Mayoral candidate	Vote	%
Fraser Tolmie (X)	3,189	55.06
John Kot	2,316	39.99
Nancy Nash	287	4.96

==== By-election ====
A by-election was held November 3, 2021 to replace Tolmie, who was elected to parliament in the 2021 Canadian federal election.

Mayoral candidate	Vote	%
Clive Tolley	1,290	21.50
Crystal Froese	1,249	20.82
Sam Morrison	1,227	20.45
Mike Simpkins	897	14.95
Heather Eby	783	13.05
Kim Robinson	220	3.67
Brett McAuley	151	2.52
Wayne Watermanuk	95	1.58
Michael Haygarth	87	1.45

=== North Battleford ===
Mayoral candidate	Vote	%
David Gillan	1,198	50.98
Ryan Bater (X)	988	42.04
Lois Laing	74	3.15
James Sieben	50	2.13
Misa Nikolic	40	1.70

=== Pilot Butte ===
==== Mayor ====
Mayoral candidate	Vote	%
Peggy Chorney (X)	429	82.34
Nat Ross	92	17.66

==== Council ====
Candidate	Vote	%	Elected
Scott Einarson	281	53.93	✓
Ed Sigmeth (X)	268	51.44	✓
Zac Forster	244	46.83	✓
Fred Salerno	239	45.87	✓
Lydia Riopka (X)	228	43.76	✓
Jean Lowenberger (X)	224	42.99	✓
Joshua Schmidt	204	39.16	
Scott Hendriks	202	38.77	
Teresa Blommaert (X)	194	37.24	
John Wegmann	144	27.64	
Leanne Rempel	136	26.10	
Kelly Feltis	128	24.57	
Arcady Rosental	86	16.51	

=== Prince Albert ===
==== Mayor ====
Mayoral candidate	Vote	%
Greg Dionne (X)	3,322	45.91
Darryl Hickie	3,077	42.52
Dennis Nowoselsky	439	6.07
Josh Morrow	398	5.50

=== Regina ===
2020 Regina municipal election
- Mayoral election
- 9 November 2020
Nominee	Sandra Masters	Michael Fougere
Popular vote	19,022	14,663
Percentage	46.36%	35.74%
Mayor before election
Michael Fougere
Elected mayor
Sandra Masters

==== Mayor ====
Mayoral candidate	Vote	%
Sandra Masters	19,022	46.36
Michael Fougere (X)	14,663	35.74
Jerry Flegel	3,242	7.90
Tony P. Fiacco	1,517	3.70
Jim Elliot	1,142	2.78
Darren Bradley	518	1.26
Mitchell C. Howse	497	1.21
George R. Wooldridge	301	0.73
Bob Pearce	127	0.31

==== Council ====
Candidate	Vote	%
Ward 1
Cheryl Stadnichuk	2,754	52.51
Barbara Young (X)	2,491	47.49
Ward 2
Bob Hawkins (X)	2,024	47.29
George Tsiklis	1,511	35.30
Bill Singh	378	8.83
Stew Fettes	367	8.57
Ward 3
Andrew Stevens (X)	2,190	72.25
Elmer Eashappie	499	16.46
Nahida Chowdhuary	209	6.90
Tom Dacosta Sealy	133	4.39
Ward 4
Lori Bresciani (X)	Acclaimed	
Ward 5
John Findura (X)	2,278	50.48
Cameron Wilkes	1,854	41.08
Rodney Francis	215	4.76
Reinier Van Everdink	166	3.68
Ward 6
Dan LeBlanc	859	31.09
Joel Murray (X)	732	26.49
Shontell Hillcoff	481	17.41
Sohel Sheik	357	12.92
Norman Hoffert	199	7.20
Rod Kletchko	135	4.89
Ward 7
Terina Shaw	993	30.75
Sharron Bryce (X)	866	26.82
Shobna Radons	851	26.35
John Gross	313	9.69
Mike Parisone	206	6.38
Ward 8
Shanon Zachidniak	1,246	37.41
Alex Tkach	852	25.58
Reid Hill	653	19.60
Wesley Stryletski	388	11.65
Carl Humphreys	192	5.76
Ward 9
Jason Mancinelli (X)	1,573	34.04
Katherine Gagné	1,291	27.94
Jeff Soroka	643	13.91
Christopher Kayter	493	10.67
Rob Humphries	464	10.04
Rod Williams	157	3.40
Ward 10
Landon Mohl	904	21.74
Adam Anderson	708	17.02
Shea Paisley	588	14.14
Cameron Hiebert	565	13.58
Mark Shmelinski	550	13.22
Charles Olsen	386	9.28
Laura Luby	349	8.39
Patrick Denis	109	2.62

=== Saskatoon ===
2020 Saskatoon municipal election
- Mayoral election
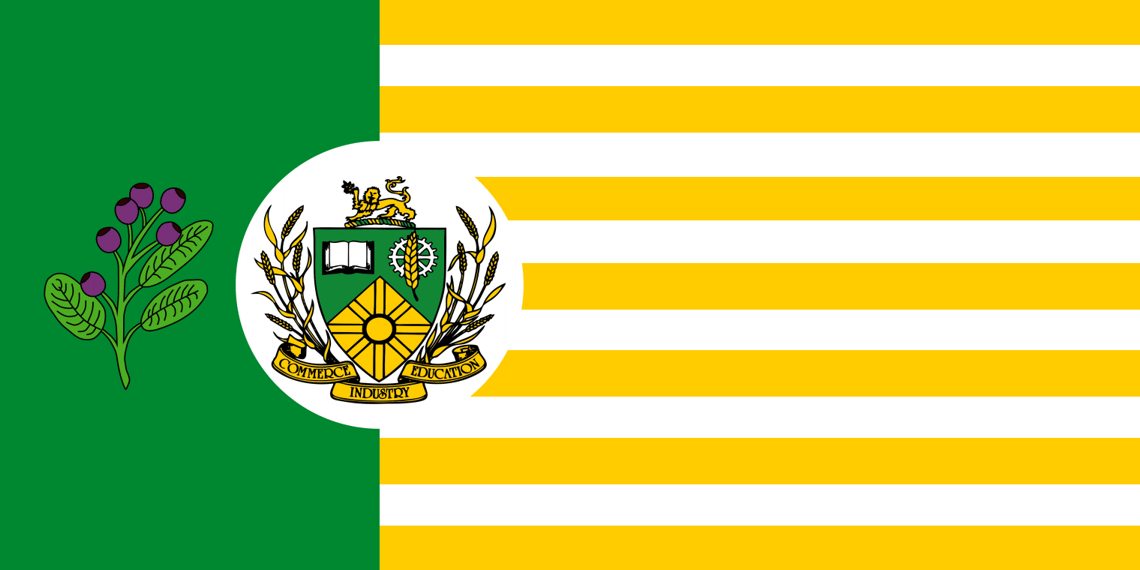
- 13 November 2020
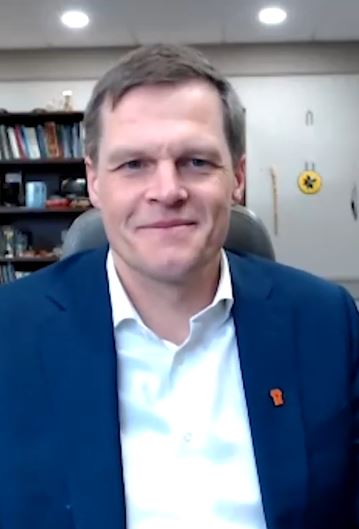

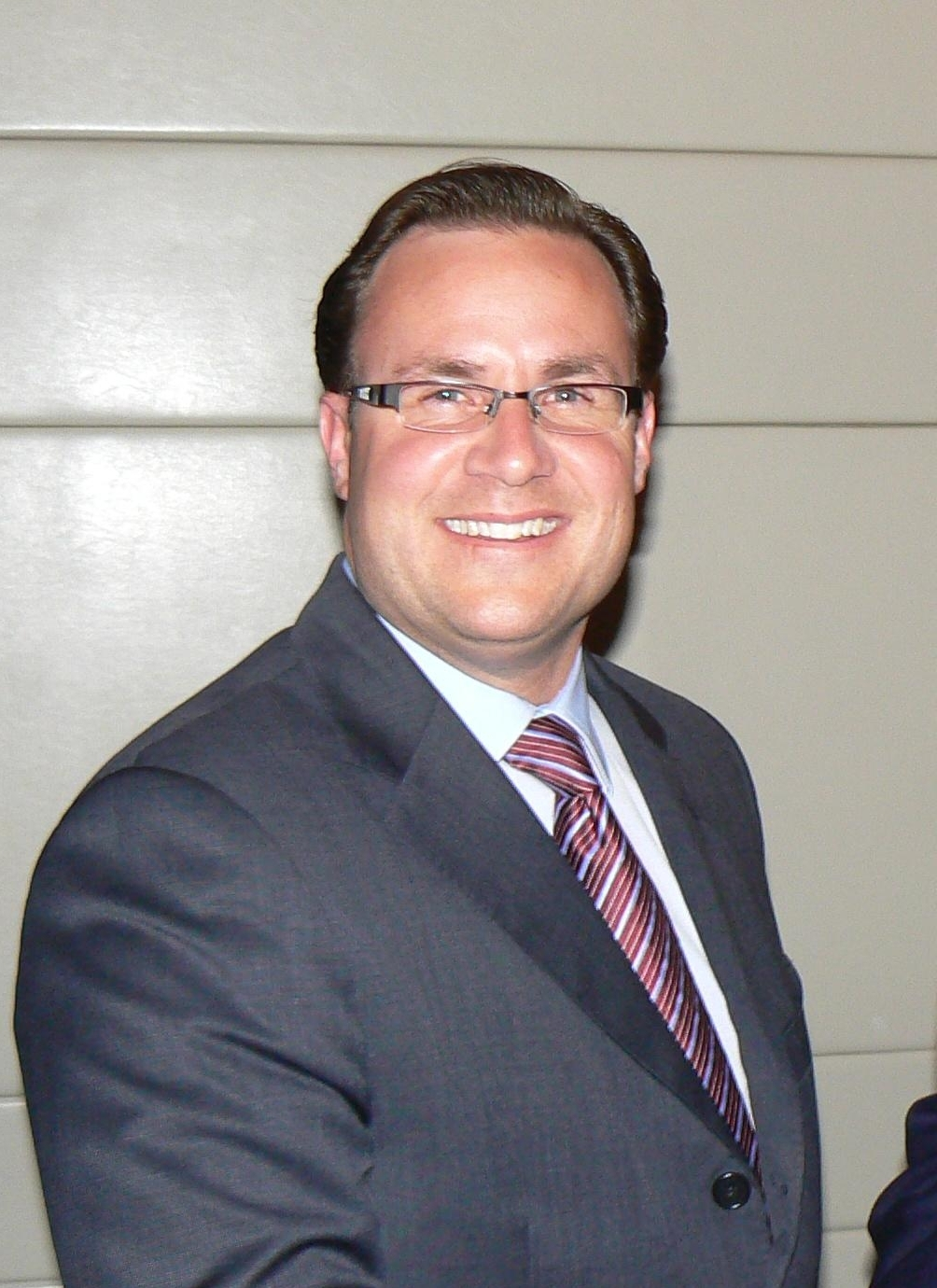
			DA
Nominee	Charlie Clark	Rob Norris	Don Atchison
Popular vote	27,377	15,261	11,722
Percentage	46.90%	26.15%	20.08%
Mayor before election
Charlie Clark
Elected mayor
Charlie Clark

Due to a snowstorm, the Saskatoon election was extended to November 13.

==== Mayor ====
Mayoral candidate	Vote	%
Charlie Clark (X)	27,377	46.90
Rob Norris	15,261	26.15
Don Atchison	11,722	20.08
Cary Tarasoff	2,650	4.54
Zubair Sheikh	721	1.24
Mark Zielke	639	1.09

==== Council ====
Candidate	Vote	%
Ward 1
Darren Hill (X)	1,639	34.51
Kevin Boychuk	1,583	33.33
Aron Cory	1,054	22.19
Kyla Kitzul	473	9.96
Ward 2
Hilary Gough (X)	2,599	66.66
Rose Kasleder	1,300	33.34
Ward 3
David Kirton	1,103	29.13
Nick Sackville	869	22.95
Janine Lazaro	648	17.12
Bobbie Ehman	383	10.12
Elizabeth Fay	290	7.66
Mark Mills	228	6.02
Christopher Sicotte	165	4.36
Colin Prang	100	2.64
Ward 4
Troy Davies (X)	Acclaimed	
Ward 5
Randy Donauer (X)	5,402	71.87
Paul Miazga	2,114	28.13
Ward 6
Cynthia Block (X)	5,004	62.97
Jon Naylor	1,525	19.19
Lee Kormish	1,418	17.84
Ward 7
Mairin Loewen (X)	3,356	47.67
Jim Rhode	1,775	25.21
Carol Reynolds	1,194	16.96
Darcy Warrington	715	10.16
Ward 8
Sarina Gersher (X)	3,307	50.37
Brian Shalovelo	2,251	34.28
Ron Mantyka	1,008	15.35
Ward 9
Bev Dubois (X)	3,637	61.99
Carla Shabaga	2,230	38.01
Ward 10
Zach Jeffries (X)	4,398	71.73
A. J. Itterman	1,135	18.51
Anjum Saeed	598	9.75

=== Swift Current ===
Due to a snowstorm, the election was postponed until November 12.

Mayoral candidate	Vote	%
Al Bridal	2,497	56.79
Denis Perrault (X)	1,900	43.21

=== Warman ===
Mayoral candidate	Vote	%
Gary Philipchuk	Acclaimed	

=== Weyburn ===
Mayoral candidate	Vote	%
Marcel Roy (X)	1,636	56.47
Nick Coroluick	1,246	43.01
Bruce Croft	15	0.52

=== Yorkton ===
Mayoral candidate	Vote	%
Mitch Hippsley	2,000	51.10
Aaron Kienle	1,914	48.90

== Rural municipalities ==
Elections in Saskatchewan’s rural municipalities were held on November 9 to elect reeves and odd-numbered division councillors.

=== Corman Park No. 344 ===
Reeve candidate	Vote	%
Judy Harwood (X)	Acclaimed	

== See also ==
- List of municipal elections in Saskatchewan
