= List of mayors of Regina, Saskatchewan =

List of mayors of Regina

Mayor of Regina
- Flag of Regina
- Incumbent; Chad Bachynski since November 18, 2024
- Style: His Worship; Mayor (informal)
- Member of: Regina City Council
- Reports to: Regina City Council
- Residence: Regina, Saskatchewan
- Seat: Regina City Hall
- Appointer: Directly elected by residents of Regina
- Term length: Four years (renewable)
- Inaugural holder: David Lynch Scott
- Formation: December 1, 1883; 142 years ago
- Salary: CA$151,015 (2020)
- Website: www.regina.ca

The mayor of Regina is head of Regina City Council, the governing body of Regina, the capital city of the Canadian province of Saskatchewan. The 36th and current mayor of the city of Regina is Chad Bachynski, who was first elected in the 2024 municipal election. The following is a list of mayors of Regina, including those who served as mayor of the town of Regina between 1884 and 1903.

From 1920 to 1926, Regina mayors were elected using instant-runoff voting. All other times a first past the post system was used.

== List of Mayors ==
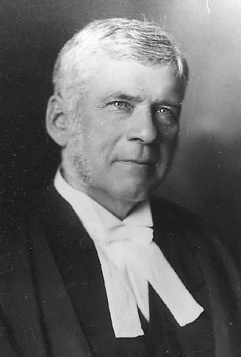
David Lynch Scott was the first mayor of Regina, from 1884 to 1885.

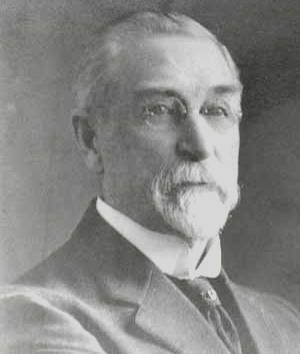
Jacob W. Smith served three separate terms as mayor in 1889, from 1902 to 1903, and from 1907 to 1908.

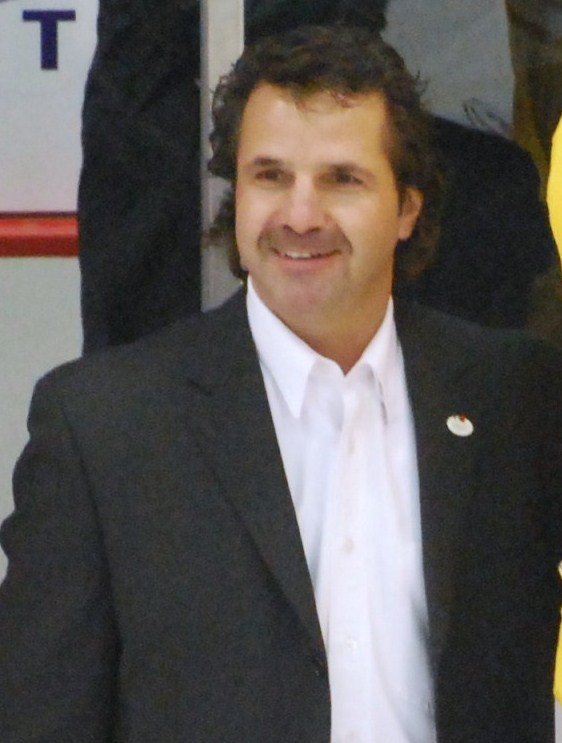
Pat Fiacco was mayor of Regina from 2000 to 2012.

No.	Mayor	Term start	Term end
Regina incorporated as a town on December 1, 1883.
1	David Lynch Scott	1884	1885
2	Daniel Mowat	1886	1887
3	W. Cayley Hamilton	1888	1888
4	Jacob W. Smith	1889	1889
5	J. A. McCaul	1890	1890
6	Richard H. Williams	1891	1892
7	John Henry Charles Willoughby	1893	1893
8	Robert Martin	1894	1894
9	George T. Marsh	1895	1895
10	William F. Eddy	1896	1897
11	Francis Nicholson Darke	1898	1898
12	John K. McInnis	1899	1899
13	William T. Mollard	1900	1901
(4)	Jacob W. Smith (2nd time)	1902	1903
Regina incorporated as a city on June 19, 1903.
(4)	Jacob W. Smith (2nd time, ctd.)	1903	1903
14	Henry Laird	1904	1905
15	Peter McAra, Jr.	1906	1906
(4)	Jacob W. Smith (3rd time)	1907	1908
16	Richard H. Williams	1909	1910
(15)	Peter McAra, Jr. (2nd time)	1911	1912
17	Robert Martin	1913	1914
18	James Balfour	1915	1915
19	Walter Davy Cowan	1916	1917
20	Henry Black	1918	1919
21	James Grassick	1920	1922
22	Stuart C. Burton	1923	1924
23	William E. Mason	1925	1926
24	James McAra	1927	1930
(18)	James Balfour (2nd time)	1931	1931
(24)	James McAra (2nd time)	1932	1933
25	Cornelius Rink	1934	1935
26	Alban C. Ellison	1936	1939
27	James Grassick	1940	1941
28	Charles Cromwell Williams	1942	1944
29	Thomas G. McNall	1945	1946
30	Hugh McGillivray	1947	1948
31	Garnet Menzies	1949	1951
32	Gordon Burton Grant	1952	1953
33	Les Hammond	1954	1956
34	Thomas Cowburn	1957	1958
35	Henry H. P. Baker	1959	1970
36	Harry G. R. Walker	1971	1973
(35)	Henry H. P. Baker (2nd time)	1974	1979
37	Larry Schneider	1980	1988
38	Doreen Hamilton	1988	1988
39	Doug Archer	1988	2000
40	Pat Fiacco	2000	2012
41	Michael Fougere	2012	2020
42	Sandra Masters	2020	2024
43	Chad Bachynski	2024	Present

== See also ==
- Regina City Council
