= McAra =

McAra is a surname. Notable people with the surname include:

- James McAra (1876–1947), Scottish-Canadian and political figure
- Lesley McAra, Scottish legal scholar
- Peter McAra Jr. (1862–1949), Scottish-Canadian and political figure
- Tracie McAra (born 1960), Canadian basketball player
- Irene McAra-McWilliam, British design researcher and academic
- Judith McAra-Couper, New Zealand midwifery academic

== See also ==
- John McAra House, historic house in Davison, Michigan
