= Cowburn =

Cowburn is a surname and a given name. Notable people with the name include:

- John Cowburn Morgan Beavan (1910–1994), British journalist, Labour life peer and Member of the European Parliament
- Allan Cowburn (1820–1875), English first-class cricketer and clergyman
- Benjamin Cowburn, agent of the UK clandestine Special Operations Executive (SOE) during World War II
- John Cowburn (1868–1947), English-born Australian politician
- Nick Cowburn (born 1995), Australian professional footballer
- Thomas Cowburn (1888–1976), educator and politician in Saskatchewan, Canada

== See also ==
- Clyde Engineering Co Ltd v Cowburn, a High Court of Australia case
- Cowburn Tunnel, railway tunnel in the Derbyshire Peak District of England
