= R. H. Williams =

R. H. Williams may refer to:

== Political figures ==
- Richard H. Williams (New York) (1807–after 1863), American state senator
- Richard Henry Williams (1852–1924), Canadian merchant; mayor of Regina, Saskatchewan

== Writers and academics ==
- Richard Hughes Williams (1878–1919), Welsh-language writer
- Robert H. Williams (physicist) (born 1940), American scientist
- Robin Williams (physicist) (Robert Hughes Williams; born 1941), Welsh physicist and academic
- Rhys H. Williams (sociologist) (born 1955), American professor of sociology
- Rosalind H. Williams, American historian of technology

== Others ==
- R. H. Williams (rugby player) (1930–1993), Welsh rugby union player
- Robert Hardin Williams (1909–1979), American physician, president of Endocrine Society.

== See also ==
- Williams (surname)
