= McNall =

McNall is a surname. Notable people with the surname include:

- Bruce McNall (born 1950), American racehorse owner and sports executive
- Thomas McNall (1874–1953), Canadian merchant and politician

== See also ==
- McCall
- McNally (surname)
