= William E. Mason (Canadian politician) =

Canadian politician and businessman

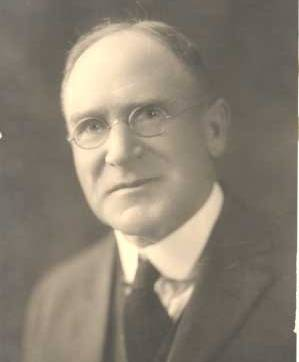

Mayor of Regina
- In office 1925–1926
- Preceded by: Stuart Burton
- Succeeded by: James McAra

Personal details
- Born: 1866 Toronto, Canada West
- Died: August 24, 1951 (aged 85) Regina, Saskatchewan
- Occupation: businessman

William Ethelbert Mason (1866 – August 24, 1951) was a businessman and political figure in Saskatchewan, Canada. He was mayor of Regina from 1925 to 1926.

He was born in Toronto and came to Regina in 1905 to open a branch of the Canada Permanent Mortgage Corporation. In 1891, he had married Helen Agnes Cockburn. In 1920, he retired from that job and opened the W. E. Mason Discount Company. Mason was also head of the Prudential Trust Company. He served as Regina's first magistrate.

His daughter, who served as a nurse in England during World War I, died of the Spanish flu.
