= Cornelius Rink =

Dutch-born businessman and political figure in Saskatchewan, Canada

Mayor of Regina
- In office 1934–1935
- Preceded by: James McAra
- Succeeded by: Alban Ellison

Personal details
- Born: September 16, 1871 Hedel, Gelderland, Netherlands
- Died: September 13, 1949 (aged 77) Regina, Saskatchewan, Canada
- Occupation: Businessman

Cornelius Rink (September 16, 1871 – September 13, 1949) was a Dutch-born businessman and political figure in Saskatchewan, Canada. He served as mayor of Regina from 1934 to 1935.

He was born in Hedel and went to South Africa in 1891 to work as a clerk for the Netherlands-South African Railway Company. He fought against the British in the Second Boer War. In 1902, he moved to the United States, immigrating to Regina in 1907, where he worked in the real estate business. In 1909, Rink married Frances Zerr. He served on Regina city council from 1911 to 1914. From 1920 to 1923, Rink and his family lived in Vancouver, returning to Regina in the latter year. He worked for a time as manager at Western Financial Agents and Regina Distributors Ltd. before being elected again to city council in 1931. Rink, a populist, was defeated by the business-oriented candidate James McAra in 1932 but defeated McAra to become mayor in 1934. In 1935, he was awarded the Silver Jubilee Medal.

Rink ran unsuccessfully as a Social Credit candidate in a provincial by-election held in 1938. He died in Regina on September 13, 1949.
