= Larry Schneider =

Larry Schneider may refer to:

- Larry Schneider (politician), Canadian politician
- Larry Schneider (musician), American jazz saxophonist
