= Doreen Hamilton =

Canadian politician (1951–2022)

The Honourable Doreen Ellen Hamilton ECS

MLA for Regina Wascana Plains
- In office October 21, 1991 – November 7, 2007
- Succeeded by: Christine Tell

Mayor of Regina, Saskatchewan
- In office 1988–1988
- Preceded by: Larry Schneider
- Succeeded by: Doug Archer

Personal details
- Born: May 17, 1951 Regina, Saskatchewan, Canada
- Died: December 2, 2022 (aged 71)
- Party: New Democratic Party
- Occupation: teacher, city councillor

Doreen Ellen Hamilton (née Munholland; May 17, 1951 – December 2, 2022) was a Canadian politician. She received her Education Standard A Certificate at the University of Regina.

In 1985, she was elected to Regina City Council and re-elected in 1988. She served as interim Mayor of Regina for six weeks in 1988, following the resignation of Larry Schneider. She was the first woman to have held this position.

Hamilton was first elected to the Legislative Assembly of Saskatchewan in 1991, and re-elected in 1995, 1999 and 2003. She was a member of the New Democratic Party. In 1998, she was appointed Minister of Saskatchewan Liquor and Gaming, and Minister responsible for the Saskatchewan Property Management Corporation, the Public Service Commission and the Wascana Center Authority. She held those ministerial positions until October 2001. In April 2003, she was appointed legislative Secretary to Premier Lorne Calvert.

Hamilton also became the first woman presiding officer in Saskatchewan after the Legislative Assembly elected her Deputy Speaker.

Hamilton did not stand as a candidate in the 2007 provincial election.

Hamilton died on December 2, 2022, at the age of 71.
