= Mollard =

Mollard may refer to:

- Mollard (surname), a list of people with the name
- Mollard (grape), or Carignan, a red wine grape
- Col du Mollard, a high mountain pass in the Alps

== See also ==
- Maurice-Mollard Plaza, a public square in Aix-les-Bains, France
- Palais Mollard-Clary, a baroque palace in Vienna, Austria
- Molard (disambiguation)
