= Doug Archer =

Mayor of Regina, Saskatchewan, Canada, from 1988 to 2000 AD

Mayor of Regina, Saskatchewan
- In office 1988–2000
- Preceded by: Doreen E. Hamilton
- Succeeded by: Pat Fiacco

Personal details
- Born: Winnipeg, Manitoba
- Spouse: Gloria
- Children: James, Lindsay and Tracy
- Occupation: Partner in KnightArcher Insurance Services

Douglas R. Archer was the Mayor of Regina, Saskatchewan, Canada, from 1988 to 2000.

== Early life ==
Archer was born in Winnipeg, Manitoba, but was raised in Saskatoon, Saskatchewan. There, he received a Bachelor of Economics, before moving to Regina, Saskatchewan in 1971.

== Public service ==
In Regina, Archer began a twelve-year career in the public service of the province, before leaving in 1983 to become a partner in Knight-Archer Insurance Services. In 1985, Archer was elected as a city councillor on the Regina City Council, and became Mayor in 1988.

After becoming Mayor, one of Archer's most noted legacy was to eliminate the city's business tax. The tax, which had caused much controversy among the business community of Regina, had been introduced prior to Archer becoming Mayor, and was replaced by persuading the then Government of Saskatchewan to make payments to all municipalities in the province to compensate for a lack of property taxes. In 1989, Archer established the Regina Regional Economic Development Authority, with the aim of developing Regina's economic potential and promoting tourism. As Regina's Mayor, Archer was elected to the Federation of Canadian Municipalities Board of Directors, serving for twelve years. In 2001, Archer's name was added to the Federation's Roll of Honour for his service in his position, following his leaving the position of Mayor of Regina the previous year.

== Personal life ==
Archer and his wife Gloria have three children, all of whom live in the Regina area. Through Knight-Archer Insurance Services, the couple are currently active participants in the city's business community. The two sponsor an annual benefit concert, Brighter Futures for Children.
