= Percy Menzies =

Canadian military personnel (1888–1948)

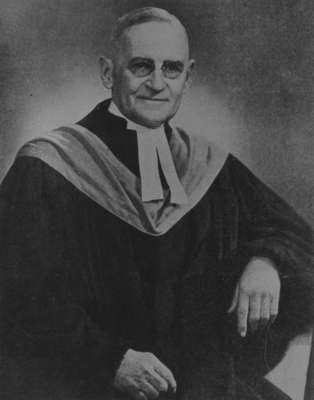
Percy Menzies

Major Albert Percy Menzies, M.C., M.A., D.D. (April 26, 1888 - December 26, 1948) was a Canadian clergyman who was twice acknowledged for gallantry in action during World War 1, and whose letters home (now preserved in the Canadian War Museum archives) provided insights on the conditions and actions of the war. He was known as "the fighting parson of Vimy Ridge".

== Early life ==
Percy Menzies was born April 26, 1888, in Aylmer, Quebec (now Gatineau), Canada and subsequently moved to Ottawa, Ontario, where his father worked as an Engineer for the Canadian Pacific Railway. He had five siblings: Garnet Menzies, Arthur Menzies, John Menzies, Mary Menzies, and Clifford Menzies. He studied religion at Queen's University from 1905 to 1913, earning a Bachelors and Masters of Divinity.

== Military career ==
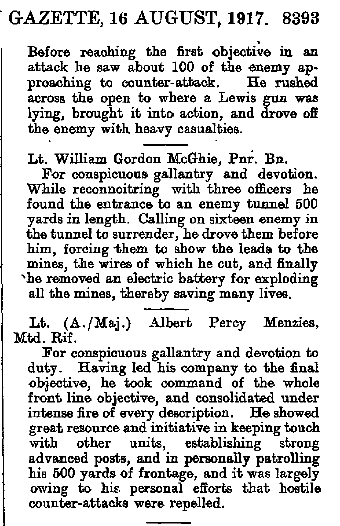
The London Gazette newspaper clipping (1917-08-16)

Menzies enrolled as a lieutenant on 18 January 1916 at Barrie, Ontario, with the 76th Canadian Infantry Battalion, Canadian Expeditionary Force (CEF), during the First World War. The battalion was dissolved on reaching England and the troops sent to reinforce other battalions. He was transferred to the 4th Canadian Mounted Rifles, which was part of the 8th Infantry Brigade, 3rd Canadian Division, and served as an officer. He was singled out for his leadership at the Battle of the Somme on 10 October 1916. During the attacks on Regina Trench, he was in charge of a party to prepare stepping off trenches for the attack. His party was supposed to be guided by an engineering officer, but when that officer was wounded by shellfire, he continued without the guide and worked at night to complete the task. In a letter to his sister shortly after the event he wrote "The Colonel and the Brigadier recommended me for the Military Cross, for a little moonlight serenade I had on the Somme. The Colonel was quite peeved because the Higher Command didn't grant the request as he was quite keen on the recommendation."

In early January 1917, Menzies was promoted to the rank of Acting Major and placed in command of a company. During the attack on Vimy Ridge on 9 April 1917, Acting Major Menzies was in command of C Company, and along with the rest of the 4th CMR was tasked with achieving an objective on the German trench system. The 3rd Division was faced toward Vimy Village with the 7th and 8th Brigades on the line and the 9th Brigade as the support. Each battalion in the 8th Brigade was to attack in four company-sized waves with the final objective three-quarters of a mile beyond La Folie Farm and the German 3rd line of forward defences. Major Menzies' C Company was responsible for capturing Fickle Trench, 1,000 yards from the Canadian line. All of the objectives of the 4th CMR were achieved less than two hours after the attack was launched, but the battalion to their extreme left, the Royal Canadian Regiment, left a 100-yard gap that had to be filled. A platoon from A Company, under Lt. B.C. Pierce, was tasked with filling the gap and they were shortly joined by reinforcements led by Major Menzies. Shortly after consolidating the gap, Pierce was killed by sniper fire while talking next to Menzies. Writing home to his brother Garnet shortly after the battle he wrote "I continued to walk along the trench and on the flank met Cliff Pierce, an officer in A Company, whom I knew at Queen's and whom I liked very much. I was shaking hands with him, when zip - a sniper's bullet shot through his heart and he fell without uttering a sound." (It has been reported elsewhere that Lt. Piece was actually shot in the head).

For his efforts on Vimy Ridge, Menzies was awarded the Military Cross: “For conspicuous gallantry and devotion to duty. Having led his company to the final objective, he took command of the whole front line objective, and consolidated under intense fire of every description. He showed great resource and initiative in keeping touch with other units, establishing strong advanced posts, and in personally patrolling his 500 yards of frontage, and it was largely owing to his personal efforts that hostile counter-attacks were repelled.” In June 1917, while his company was deployed in the lines and running protective patrols around Hill 70, he was wounded by shellfire. He was relieved of command of C Company on 16 July due to his wounds and relinquished the acting rank of Major. He had however been promoted from Lieutenant to Temporary Captain. After the war, he returned to his pre-war occupation as a clergyman.

== Post-War Ministry and Service ==
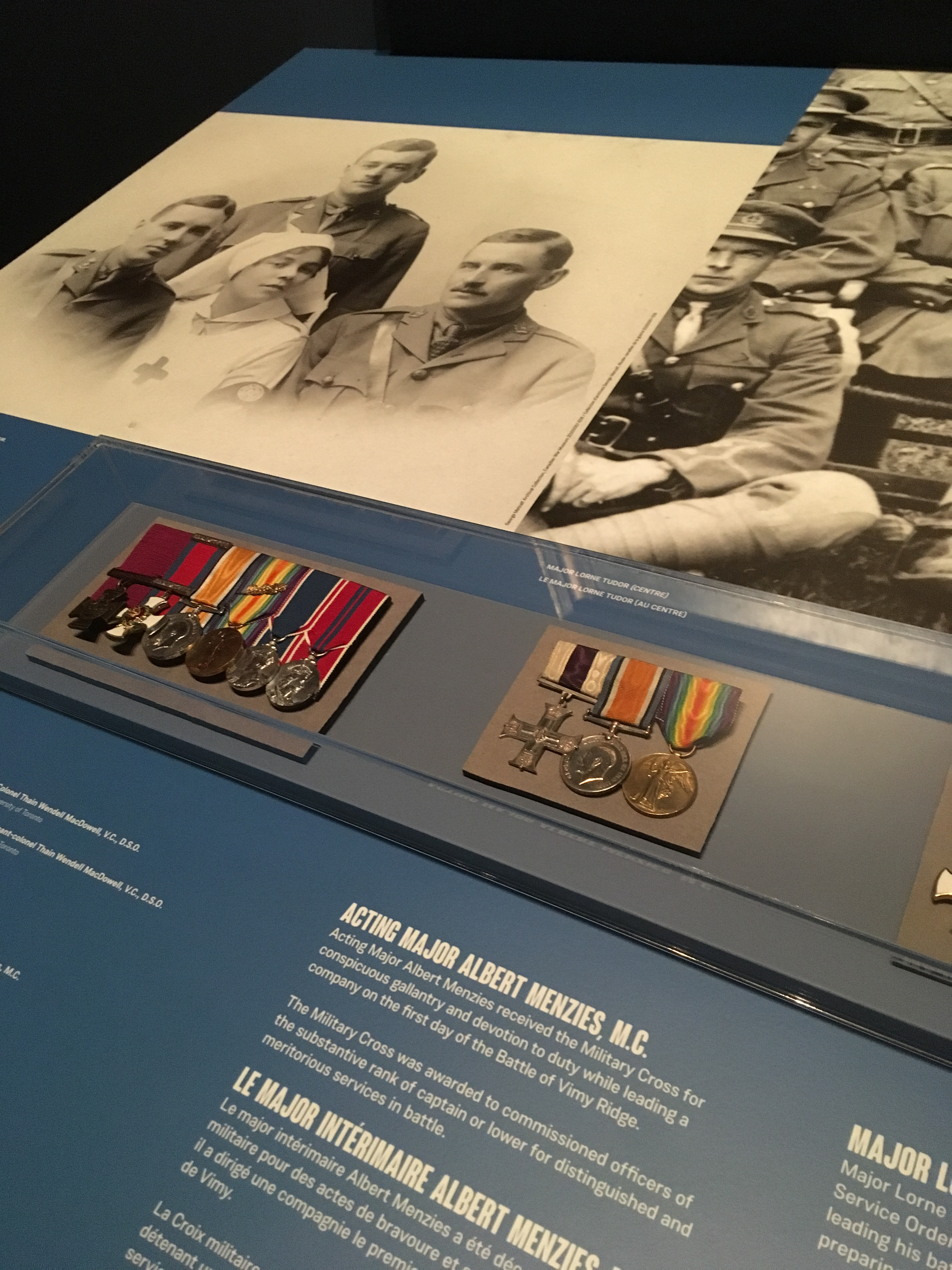
Percy Menzies' medals (and family photograph) on display at the Canadian War Museum, Ottawa

Menzies received an Honorary Doctor of Divinity (DD) degree from Queen's University in 1948. He died on December 26, 1948, at Ottawa and is buried in Beechwood Cemetery, Ottawa.
