= Henry Black (Saskatchewan politician) =

Saskatchewan politician (1875–1960)

Mayor of Regina
- In office 1918–1919
- Preceded by: Walter Davy Cowan
- Succeeded by: James Grassick

Personal details
- Born: February 14, 1875 Kemptville, Ontario, Canada
- Died: August 29, 1960 (aged 85) Regina, Saskatchewan, Canada
- Spouse: Jennie Barker
- Occupation: Real estate developer

Henry Black, CBE (February 14, 1875 – August 29, 1960) was a contractor and real estate developer in Regina, Saskatchewan, where he served as mayor, and from 1931 to 1934 he chaired the Saskatchewan Relief Commission.

== Biography ==
Black was born in Kemptville, Ontario, in 1875. After completing his education, he managed the general store at a railway construction camp in Leonard, Ontario. In 1899 he moved to Kaslo, British Columbia, a mining town, where he operated a lumber, coal, and shipping business.

He arrived in Regina in 1903 and became a contractor and real estate speculator, benefiting from the fledgling city's construction boom. At first in partnership with Archibald McGregor, and then independently, he built department stores, schools, farmer markets and apartment blocks. In 1910 he married Jennie Barker, and they had five children together. Black's first son, Henry Kenneth "Ken" Black, went on to become a prominent Regina architect.

In 1917 with a group of local investors, Black established the Prairie Biscuit and Confectionery Company, a wholesale baking enterprise, but the business couldn't withstand the sugar shortage imposed by the First World War and it ceased operations before the end of 1918.

He served as a Regina alderman from 1915 to 1917, and was twice elected mayor, in 1918 and 1919. During Black's first term as mayor, Saskatchewan was stricken by the influenza pandemic, and he had to ban all public gatherings in the city including church services. In his second term, he was credited with convincing Regina labour leaders not to participate in a general strike along the lines of the 1919 Winnipeg General Strike. Black unsuccessfully ran for the Conservatives against Premier William Martin in the 1921 provincial election. He again served as a Regina alderman from 1923 to 1924.

In 1931, Black was asked by the government to assume the chairmanship of the Saskatchewan Relief Commission. Coupled with the onset of the Depression, the failure of crops in a largely agricultural province was disastrous. In its first year alone, the Commission distributed relief to 305,000 people, close to one-third of Saskatchewan's population. It operated camps and dining halls for homeless men in Regina, Moose Jaw, and Saskatoon, using those places as bases to provide men with jobs on farms. The Commission managed the provincial government's relief programs until August 1934, and Black oversaw the spending of $35 million ($525 million in 2005 dollars). In recognition of his voluntary work with the Relief Commission, he was made in 1935 a Commander of the Order of the British Empire (CBE) by King George V.

In 1937, at the age of 63, he once again ran for mayor of Regina, but was defeated. He continued to manage his business interests in Regina until his death in 1960.
