= Ralph Goodale =

Canadian politician and diplomat

The Honourable Ralph Goodale PC
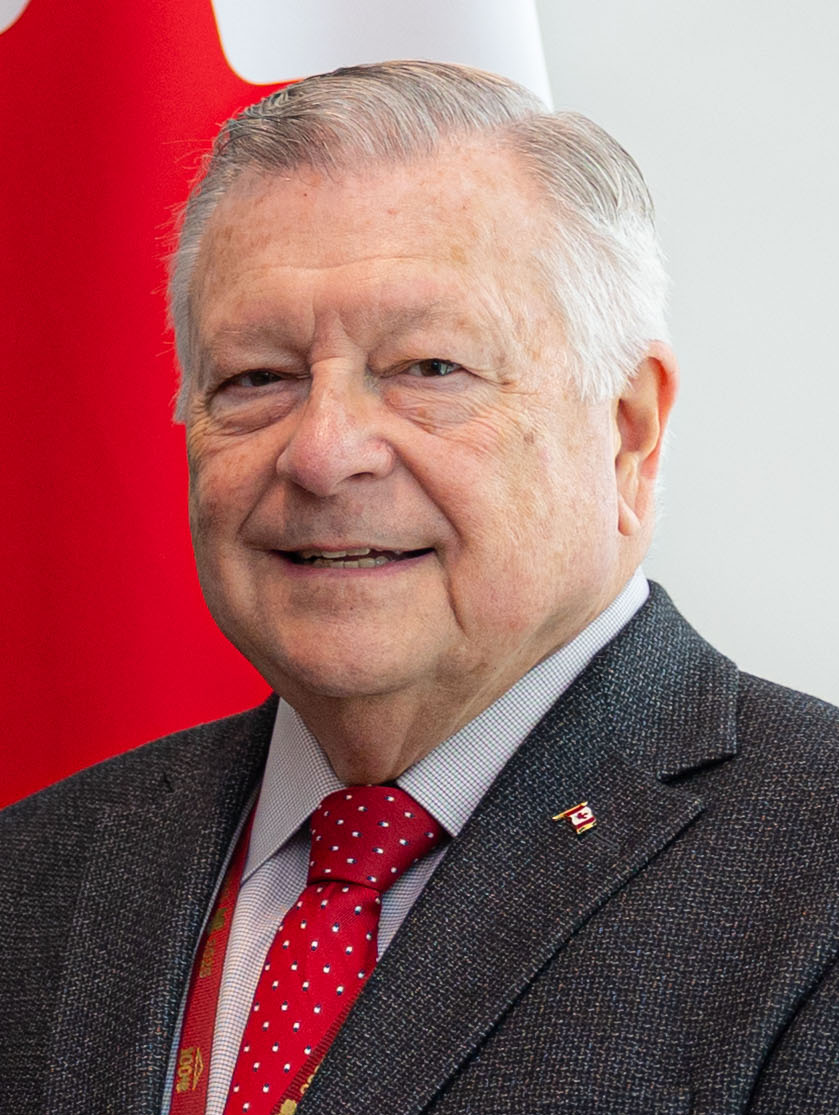
- Goodale in 2025

Canadian High Commissioner to the United Kingdom
- In office April 13, 2021 – December 17, 2025
- Prime Minister: Justin Trudeau; Mark Carney
- Preceded by: Stefanie Beck (acting)
- Succeeded by: Bill Blair

Minister of Public Safety and Emergency Preparedness
- In office November 4, 2015 – November 19, 2019
- Prime Minister: Justin Trudeau
- Preceded by: Steven Blaney
- Succeeded by: Bill Blair

Minister of Finance
- In office December 11, 2003 – February 6, 2006
- Prime Minister: Paul Martin
- Preceded by: John Manley
- Succeeded by: Jim Flaherty

Minister of Public Works and Government Services
- In office May 26, 2002 – December 11, 2003
- Prime Minister: Jean Chrétien
- Preceded by: Don Boudria
- Succeeded by: Stephen Owen

Minister of Natural Resources
- In office June 11, 1997 – January 14, 2002
- Prime Minister: Jean Chrétien
- Preceded by: Anne McLellan
- Succeeded by: Herb Dhaliwal

Minister of Agriculture and Agri-Food
- In office November 4, 1993 – June 10, 1997
- Prime Minister: Jean Chrétien
- Preceded by: Charles Mayer
- Succeeded by: Lyle Vanclief

Member of Parliament for Regina—Wascana (Wascana 1997–2015)
- In office October 25, 1993 – October 20, 2019
- Preceded by: Larry Schneider
- Succeeded by: Michael Kram

Member of the Legislative Assembly of Saskatchewan for Assiniboia-Gravelbourg
- In office October 20, 1986 – January 1, 1988
- Preceded by: Allen Engel
- Succeeded by: Jack Wolfe

Member of Parliament for Assiniboia
- In office July 8, 1974 – May 22, 1979
- Preceded by: Bill Knight
- Succeeded by: Lenard Gustafson

Deputy Leader of the Liberal Party
- In office September 7, 2010 – November 3, 2015
- Leader: Michael Ignatieff; Bob Rae (interim); Justin Trudeau
- Preceded by: Michael Ignatieff (2009)

Leader of the Saskatchewan Liberal Party
- In office June 13, 1981 – October 7, 1988
- Preceded by: Edward Cyril Malone
- Succeeded by: Lynda Haverstock (1989)

Personal details
- Born: Ralph Edward Goodale; October 5, 1949 (age 77) Regina, Saskatchewan, Canada
- Party: Liberal
- Spouse: Pam Goodale
- Education: University of Regina (BA); University of Saskatchewan (LLB)

Ralph Edward Goodale (born October 5, 1949) is a Canadian diplomat and retired politician who served as the Canadian High Commissioner to the United Kingdom from 2021 to 2025.

Goodale was first elected in 1974 as the member of Parliament (MP) for Assiniboia, as a member of the Liberal Party. He was defeated in 1979, and moved into provincial Saskatchewan politics, serving as leader of the Saskatchewan Liberals from 1981 to 1988. He returned to federal politics in 1993, as the MP for Regina—Wascana (known simply as Wascana from 1997 to 2015), and served in the governments of Jean Chrétien, Paul Martin and Justin Trudeau, in several roles including as minister of finance and minister of public safety. He was defeated in 2019 and retired from politics.

== Early life ==
Goodale was born in Regina, Saskatchewan and raised on a farm near Wilcox, Saskatchewan, the son of Winnifred Claire (Myers) and Thomas Henry Goodale. He was a member of Scouts Canada and earned the rank of Queen's Scout. He first attended the University of Saskatchewan, Regina Campus and then obtained a law degree from the University of Saskatchewan in Saskatoon, where he was awarded the Gold Medal for academic achievement.

== Federal politics, 1974–1979 ==
Active at politics from a young age, he was first elected to the Parliament of Canada in the 1974 election at the age of 24 from the seat of Assiniboia. He defeated New Democratic Party (NDP) incumbent Bill Knight. He served as a backbench supporter of Prime Minister Pierre Trudeau's government until the 1979 election, when he was defeated, coming in third behind winning Progressive Conservative Lenard Gustafson and Knight.

== Provincial politics ==
In 1981, Goodale was named leader of the Saskatchewan Liberal Party. He led that party to a very poor showing in the 1982 provincial election, in which the party received 4.51% of the popular vote and won no seats in the provincial legislature. However, Goodale was the only Liberal candidate to receive more than 1,000 votes; he won 2,760 in Assiniboia-Gravelbourg and lost narrowly to incumbent Allen Engel.

The party won 9.99% of the vote in the 1986 provincial election, but only Goodale was elected to the legislature, defeating Engel in a rematch. Goodale ran on a platform of fiscal responsibility in this election, arguing that both the Progressive Conservative and New Democratic parties favoured excessive spending policies, typified by their proposals for a Keynesian-style stimulation of the provincial economy through subsidized home improvement and renovation schemes.

== Return to federal politics ==
=== Defeated in 1988 election ===
Goodale resigned as leader to run for the federal Liberals in the 1988 election for the seat of Regina—Wascana. He lost narrowly to former Regina mayor Larry Schneider, who later went on to serve briefly in Kim Campbell's cabinet. Beginning earlier that year and prior to his resignation, Goodale's executive assistant was Jason Kenney. Kenney would become a Conservative Party of Canada MP in Calgary ridings Calgary Southeast and Calgary Midnapore (1997–2016) and later Premier of Alberta (2019-2022).

Goodale then spent five years in the private sector, working for companies such as the Pioneer Life Assurance Company, Pioneer Lifeco Inc., and Sovereign Life Insurance Co.; he has stated in interviews that he felt his political career had ended.

=== In government, 1993–2006 ===
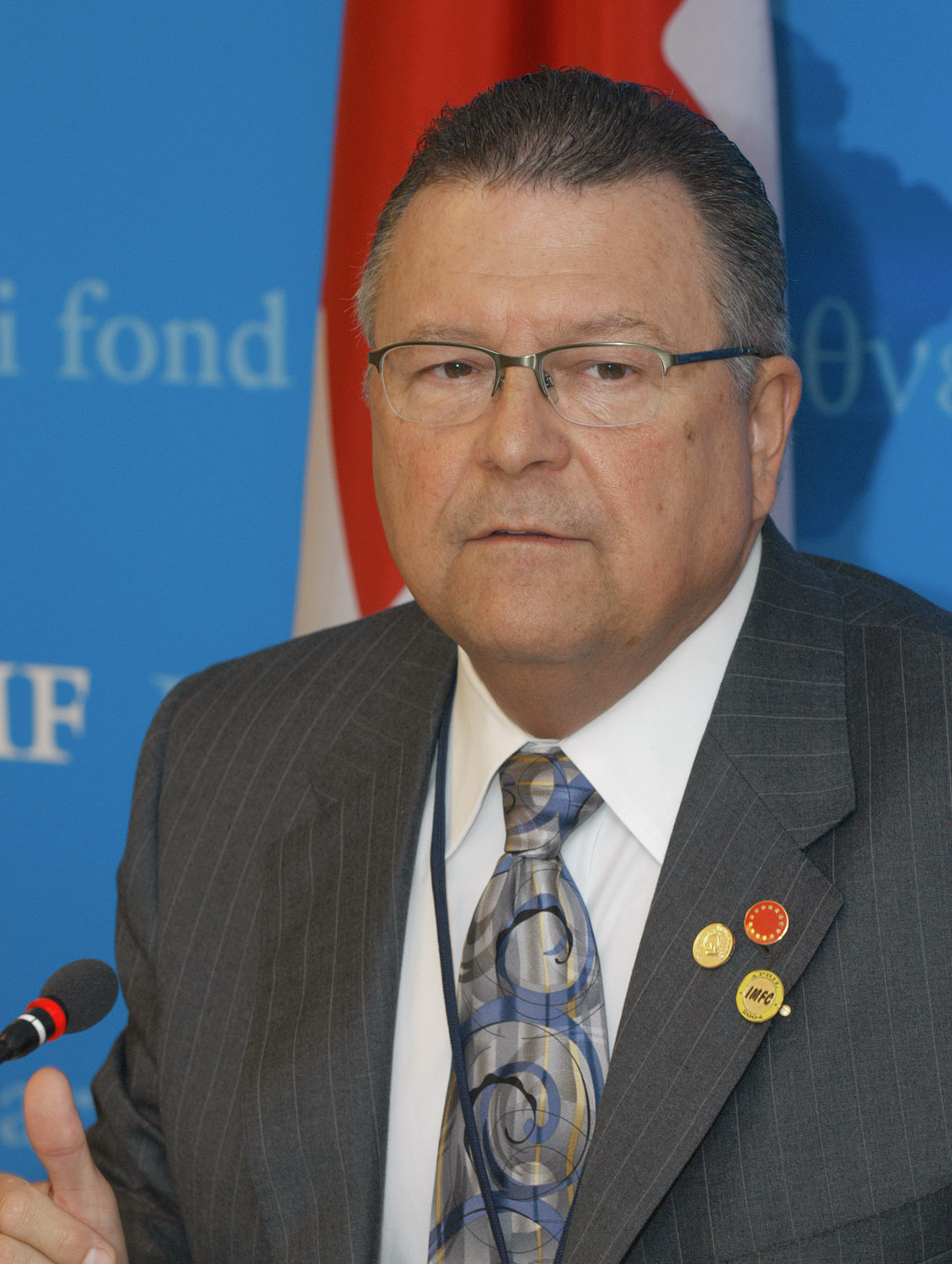
Goodale in 2004.

Goodale contested Regina—Wascana again in the 1993 federal election and was elected as part of the Liberal landslide that year. As a member of the new Chrétien cabinet, Goodale was named Minister of Agriculture and Agri-Food. He has the prenominal "the Honourable" and the postnominal "PC" for life by virtue of being made a member of the Queen's Privy Council for Canada on November 4, 1993. He was reelected for this riding, known as Wascana from 1997 to 2015, in the next seven federal elections. During this time, he made a guest appearance on the episode "Picture Perfect" of Corner Gas (season 3, episode 9, which aired on November 14, 2005.

In 1997, he became the Minister of Natural Resources. In May 2002, he was named Minister of Public Works and Government Services, a few weeks after the Auditor General Sheila Fraser issued a report accusing the department of inappropriate contracting practices. This began the exposure of the Sponsorship scandal.

A close ally of Paul Martin, Goodale was appointed to the senior portfolio of Finance Minister when Martin became Prime Minister on December 12, 2003. In that capacity he tabled two consecutive balanced budgets and launched the Government's productivity agenda.

On December 28, 2005, a letter surfaced from Royal Canadian Mounted Police (RCMP) Commissioner Giuliano Zaccardelli confirming the force was launching a criminal investigation into whether details regarding government tax policies relating to income trust funds were leaked from the Finance Minister's office. Goodale said he would co-operate completely with any investigation, but would not step aside while the RCMP continued their probe. The investigation dealt only with the Department of Finance, and not the minister himself. On February 15, 2007 the RCMP announced the conclusion of the income trust investigation and laid a charge of 'Breach of Trust' against Serge Nadeau, an official in the Department of Finance, who pleaded guilty in 2010. Goodale was cleared of any wrongdoing, and blamed the NDP's Judy Wasylycia-Leis for sabotaging the Liberals in the 2006 election.

=== In opposition, 2006–2015 ===
Goodale was re-elected to the House of Commons in the general election on January 23, 2006, but the Conservatives won government and he lost his cabinet position. He was named Opposition House Leader by interim Liberal leader Bill Graham in 2006, and continued to serve in this role under the leaderships of Stéphane Dion and Michael Ignatieff until September 2010 when he was promoted to Deputy Leader.

==== 2006 Liberal Party leadership election ====
After the Liberals' defeat and Paul Martin's election-night announcement that he would resign as party leader, Goodale initially indicated that he was not interested in succeeding Martin in that post. "I do not anticipate ever having to cross that bridge," he said. "I rule it out." On March 13, 2006, the Toronto Star reported that Goodale was reconsidering his decision, and stated that he may enter the Liberal leadership election after all. In the end, he declined, citing his inability to speak French as a key reason. On November 28, 2006, he endorsed Bob Rae to be the next leader of the Liberal Party. After the third ballot, Bob Rae, who finished third, was eliminated. Goodale then endorsed Stéphane Dion, the eventual winner.

Goodale was opposed to David Orchard's candidacy in the by-election for Desnethé—Missinippi—Churchill River. Dion terminated the nomination contest and appointed Joan Beatty as the candidate.

==== Proposed coalition government, 2008 ====
Goodale was re-elected once more in the fall of 2008. One month later, in November 2008, the Liberals and their fellow opposition parties in the Canadian parliament, the NDP and Bloc Québécois, indicated their intention to defeat Stephen Harper's Conservative government in a motion of no confidence, and expressed their desire for Governor General Michaëlle Jean to ask a member of the opposition to form a new government. While there was initially some speculation that Goodale would become Prime Minister of Canada as leader of the proposed coalition government, the coalition agreement simply made "the leader of the Liberal Party" Prime Minister. The Liberals agreed shortly after that Stéphane Dion would lead the government on an interim basis until a new Liberal leader was chosen. In the end, at Prime Minister Harper's request, Jean prorogued Parliament before a confidence vote could be put to the House. By the time Parliament resumed in January 2009, Michael Ignatieff had become interim leader of the party. He did not seek to bring down the government and agreed to support Harper's budget with amendments.

==== 2011 election ====
Goodale was one of the 34 Liberal MPs who was returned in the 2011 federal election, the Liberal Party of Canada's worst-ever electoral performance. He and Kevin Lamoureux of Winnipeg North in Winnipeg, Manitoba, were the only two Liberal MPs elected from the Prairie provinces.

The NDP surpassed the Liberals in number of seats, becoming the official opposition, resulted in priority in choosing parliamentary offices. They requested that Goodale forfeit his suite in the coveted Center Block. The Liberals saw this as a measure of disrespect to Goodale, noting that he had seniority as a former cabinet minister and house leader, despite this being standard practice and noting the Conservatives had not asked any Liberals to give up their offices.

=== In government, 2015–2019 ===
The Liberals won a majority government in the 2015 federal election, and Goodale was re-elected to a ninth term in the House of Commons, once again representing Regina—Wascana as a consequence of electoral district redistribution. In his first cabinet, the new prime minister Justin Trudeau named Goodale to be Minister of Public Safety and Emergency Preparedness. He was the only MP to serve in government with both Pierre and Justin Trudeau. An order in council on November 4, 2015, placed Goodale as first in line to assume the prime minister's powers and duties as acting prime minister, should Prime Minister Justin Trudeau become incapacitated. Trudeau did not appoint a deputy prime minister at that time.

Goodale sought re-election in the 2019 federal election, but lost his bid to Conservative Party candidate Michael Kram in a rematch of the 2015 race. Despite having represented the riding since 1993, Goodale was defeated by more than 16 percentage points.

== Post-political career ==
On March 31, 2020, Prime Minister Justin Trudeau announced the appointment of Goodale as Special Advisor to the Government of Canada's response to Ukraine International Airlines Flight 752 crash. Goodale will "examine lessons learned" from Ukraine International Airlines Flight 752, Ethiopian Airlines Flight 302, Air India Flight 182 and other air disasters and "develop a framework to guide Canada's responses to international air disasters."

=== Diplomatic career ===
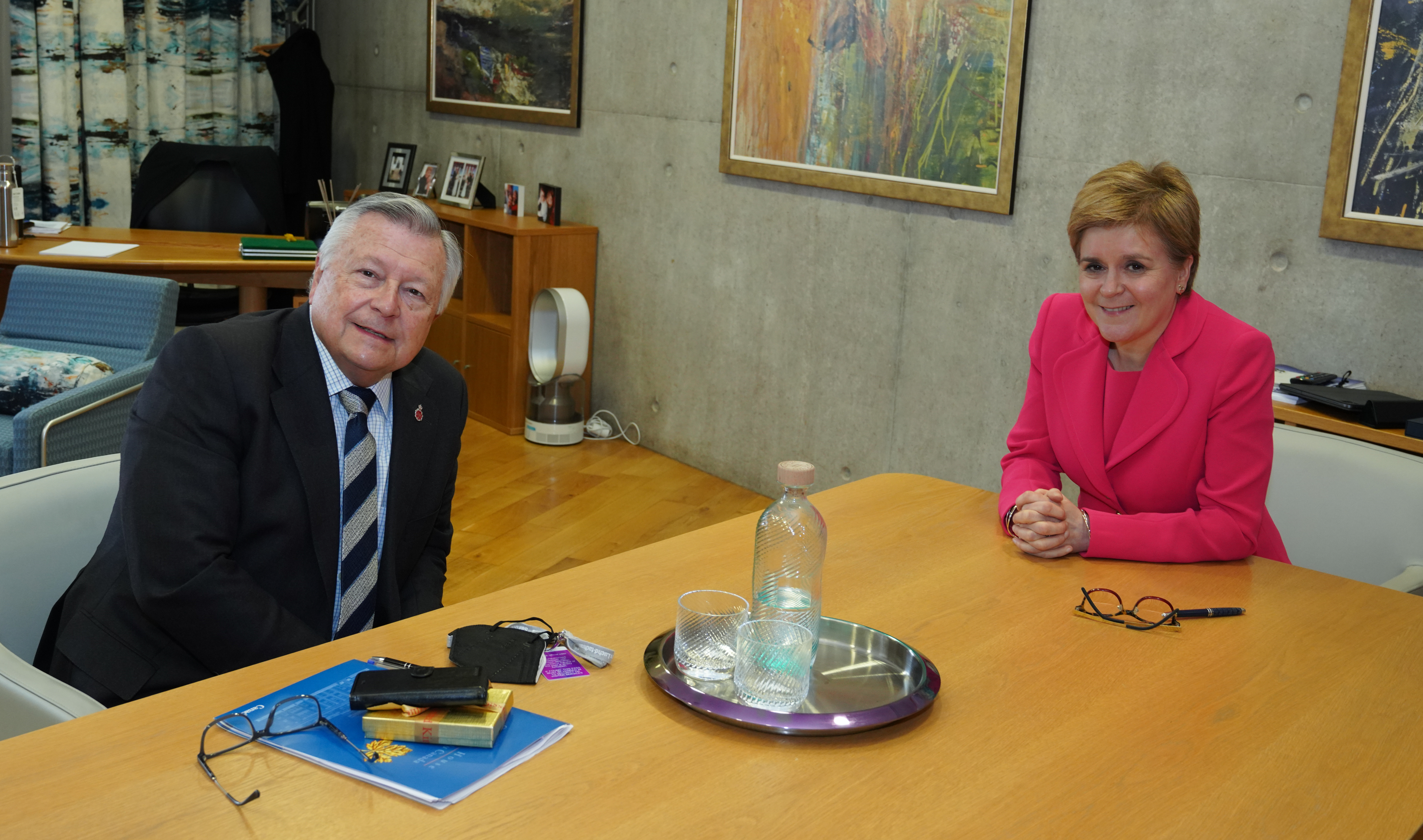
Goodale with Scottish First Minister Nicola Sturgeon in 2022.

Goodale was appointed the Canadian High Commissioner to the United Kingdom on April 13, 2021, replacing Janice Charette, who was appointed the interim clerk of the Privy Council. The appointment drew praise from Saskatchewan premier Scott Moe, who called the appointment "well deserved" and stating Goodale will be "a real advocate and a great representative for the nation and Canada, but he’ll also be, in many ways, a great representative for the province of Saskatchewan", as well as Conservative foreign affairs critic Michael Chong, who said Goodale "brings a lot of experience to the job". Goodale's priorities in the position will include "working with the U.K. on climate change and the recovery from the COVID-19 pandemic" as well as replacing the "transitional trade agreement with a permanent deal in the wake of Brexit". On December 13, 2023, Goodale was appointed as representative of Canada to the Ismaili Imamat. His tenure ended in December 2025.

=== Advisory Committee on Canada-US Economic Relations ===
On April 21, 2026, Prime Minister Mark Carney announced the appointment of Goodale to a new Advisory Committee on Canada-US Economic Relations.

== Electoral record ==
=== Regina—Wascana ===
2019 Canadian federal election: Regina—Wascana
Party	Candidate	Votes	%	±%	Expenditures
Conservative	Michael Kram	22,418	49.43	+19.16	$74,982.33
Liberal	Ralph Goodale	15,242	33.61	-21.52	$92,046.46
New Democratic	Hailey Clark	5,801	12.79	+0.24	none listed
Green	Tamela Friesen	1,316	2.90	+0.85	$2,193.36
People's	Mario Milanovski	450	0.99	-	$4,344.47
Independent	Evangeline Godron	128	0.28	-	none listed
Total valid votes/expense limit		45,355	99.25		
Total rejected ballots		344	0.75	+0.34	
Turnout		45,699	75.60	+0.99	
Eligible voters		60,451			
Conservative gain from Liberal		Swing		+20.34	
Source: Elections Canada

2015 Canadian federal election: Regina—Wascana
Party	Candidate	Votes	%	±%	Expenditures
Liberal	Ralph Goodale	23,552	55.13	+13.37	$96,786.47
Conservative	Michael Kram	12,931	30.27	-5.44	$89,000.81
New Democratic	April Bourgeois	5,362	12.55	-7.53	$21,735.49
Green	Frances Simonson	878	2.06	-0.4	$4,601.01
Total valid votes/expense limit		42,723	99.59		$193,043.93
Total rejected ballots		176	0.41	–	
Turnout		42,889	74.60	–	
Eligible voters		57,504			
Liberal hold		Swing		+9.41	
Source: Elections Canada

2011 Canadian federal election: Wascana
Party	Candidate	Votes	%	±%	Expenditures
Liberal	Ralph Goodale	15,823	40.8	-5.2	$65,366
Conservative	Ian Shields	14,291	36.9	+2.3	$74,976
New Democratic	Marc Spooner	7,681	19.8	+5.1	$25,821
Green	Bill Clary	954	2.5	-2.1	$755
Total valid votes		38,749	100.0	–	
Total rejected ballots		106	0.3	0.0	
Turnout		38,855	68.1	+3.9	
Eligible voters		57,034	–	–	

2008 Canadian federal election: Wascana
Party	Candidate	Votes	%	±%	Expenditures
Liberal	Ralph Goodale	17,028	46.0	-5.7	$66,057
Conservative	Michelle Hunter	12,798	34.6	+4.4	$66,686
New Democratic	Stephen Moore	5,418	14.7	+0.2	$19,393
Green	George Wooldridge	1,706	4.6	+1.1	$4,204
Total valid votes/expense limit		36,950	100.0	$77,030	
Total rejected ballots		121	0.3	+0.1	
Turnout		37,071	64.2	-6	

2006 Canadian federal election: Wascana
Party	Candidate	Votes	%	±%	Expenditures
Liberal	Ralph Goodale	20,666	51.8	-5.4	$66,648
Conservative	Brad Farquhar	11,990	30.0	+5.8	$67,579
New Democratic	Helen Yum	5,880	14.7	-1.3	$30,123
Green	Nigel Taylor	1,378	3.5	+0.9	$1,653
Total valid votes		39,914	100.0		
Total rejected ballots		94	0.2	0.0	
Turnout		40,008	70	+7	

2004 Canadian federal election: Wascana
Party	Candidate	Votes	%	±%	Expenditures
Liberal	Ralph Goodale	20,567	57.2	+16.0	$43,226
Conservative	Doug Cryer	8,709	24.2	-11.9	$57,802
New Democratic	Erin M.K. Weir	5,771	16.0	-5.5	$29,783
Green	Darcy Robilliard	928	2.6		
Total valid votes		35,975	100.0		
Total rejected ballots		80	0.2	-0.1	
Turnout		36,055	63.1	+0.9	

Note: Conservative vote is compared to the Canadian Alliance vote in 2000 election.

2000 Canadian federal election: Wascana
Party	Candidate	Votes	%	±%	Expenditures
Liberal	Ralph Goodale	14,244	41.2	-0.7	$56,685
Alliance	James Rybchuk	12,492	36.1	+7.2	$59,667
New Democratic	Garth Ormiston	7,446	21.5	-6.8	$58,098
Canadian Action	Wayne Gilmer	401	1.2	+0.4	$1,619
Total valid votes		34,583	100.0		
Total rejected ballots		98	0.3	-0.1	
Turnout		34,681	62.3	-4.0	

Note: Canadian Alliance vote is compared to the Reform vote in 1997 election.

1997 Canadian federal election: Wascana
Party	Candidate	Votes	%	±%	Expenditures
Liberal	Ralph Goodale	14,077	41.9	-2.4	$54,021
New Democratic	John Burton	9,530	28.4	+7.2	$37,942
Reform	Glen Blager	7,261	21.6	+5.9	$39,285
Progressive Conservative	Michael Morris	2,477	7.4	-8.4	$18,266
Canadian Action	Walter P. Sigda	264	0.8	–	$1,822
Total valid votes		33,609	100.0		
Total rejected ballots		136	0.4		
Turnout		33,745	66.2		

1993 Canadian federal election: Regina—Wascana
Party	Candidate	Votes	%	±%
Liberal	Ralph Goodale	19,555	44.3	+11.5
New Democratic	Donna Shire	9,323	21.1	-11.8
Progressive Conservative	Larry Schneider	6,943	15.7	-18.3
Reform	Andrew Jackson	6,935	15.7	–
National	John Keen	734	1.7	–
Natural Law	C. Angus Hunt	228	0.5	–
Christian Heritage	Hugh Owens	192	0.4	–
Independent	Barry James Farr	185	0.4	–
Canada Party	Walter P. Sigda	64	0.1	–
Total valid votes		44,159	100.0	

1988 Canadian federal election: Regina—Wascana
Party	Candidate	Votes	%
Progressive Conservative	Larry Schneider	15,339	34.0
New Democratic	Dickson Bailey	14,829	32.9
Liberal	Ralph Goodale	14,804	32.8
Communist	Kimball Cariou	76	0.2
Libertarian	Ian Christopher Madsen	65	0.1
Total valid votes		45,113	100.0

=== Assiniboia-Gravelbourg ===
Saskatchewan General Election 1986: Assiniboia-Gravelbourg
Party	Candidate	Votes	%	±%
Liberal	Ralph Edward Goodale	3,246	41.01	+8.66
New Democratic	Allen Willard Engel	2,395	30.26	-3.43
Progressive Conservative	Bill Fancourt	2,273	28.72	+0.14
Total		7,914	100.00	

Saskatchewan General Election 1982: Assiniboia-Gravelbourg
Party	Candidate	Votes	%	±%
New Democratic	Allen Willard Engel	2,875	33.69	-4.80
Liberal	Ralph Edward Goodale	2,760	32.34	-0.43
Progressive Conservative	Rene Archambault	2,438	28.57	-0.13
Western Canada Concept	Hugh Clarke	459	5.37	-
Total		8,532		

=== Assiniboia ===
1980 Canadian federal election
Party	Candidate	Votes
Progressive Conservative	Lenard Gustafson	11,251
Liberal	Ralph Goodale	10,167
New Democratic	Randy MacKenzie	9,710
Social Credit	Walton Eddy	178

1979 Canadian federal election
Party	Candidate	Votes
Progressive Conservative	Lenard Gustafson	12,365
New Democratic	Bill Knight	11,183
Liberal	Ralph Goodale	9,955
Social Credit	Walton Eddy	292

1974 Canadian federal election
Party	Candidate	Votes
Liberal	Ralph Goodale	9,986
New Democratic	Bill Knight	9,441
Progressive Conservative	Tom Hart	7,105
Social Credit	Rod McRae	246

== Honours ==
=== Commonwealth honours ===
Commonwealth honours

Country	Date	Appointment	Post-nominal letters
Canada	4 November 1993 – Present	Member of the Queen's Privy Council for Canada	PC
Canada	6 February 1977 – Present	Queen Elizabeth II Silver Jubilee Medal	
Canada	7 May 1992 – Present	125th Anniversary of the Confederation of Canada Medal	
Canada	6 February 2002 – Present	Queen Elizabeth II Golden Jubilee Medal	
Canada	6 February 2012 – Present	Queen Elizabeth II Diamond Jubilee Medal	

26th Canadian Ministry (1993–2003) – Cabinet of Jean Chrétien
Cabinet posts (4)
Predecessor	Office	Successor
Don Boudria	Minister of Public Works and Government Services; 2002–2003	Stephen Owen
	Minister of State; 2002; NB: no portfolio specified (while House Leader)	
Anne McLellan	Minister of Natural Resources; 1997–2002	Herb Dhaliwal
Charlie Mayer	Minister of Agriculture and Agri-Food; 1993–1997; NB: "Minister of Agriculture" before 1995	Lyle Vanclief
Special Cabinet Responsibilities
Predecessor	Title	Successor
New office	Minister responsible for the Canadian Wheat Board; 1997–2003	Reg Alcock
Anne McLellan	Federal Interlocutor for Métis and Non-Status Indians; 1997–2003	Denis Coderre
Special Parliamentary Responsibilities
Predecessor	Title	Successor
Don Boudria	Leader of the Government in the House of Commons; 2002	Don Boudria
27th Canadian Ministry (2003–2006) – Cabinet of Paul Martin
Cabinet post (1)
Predecessor	Office	Successor
John Manley	Minister of Finance; 2003–2006	Jim Flaherty
Political offices
Preceded by Jay Hill	Opposition House Leader; 2006–2010	Succeeded by David McGuinty
29th Canadian Ministry (2015–2025) – Cabinet of Justin Trudeau
Cabinet post (1)
Predecessor	Office	Successor
Steven Blaney	Minister of Public Safety and Emergency Preparedness; 2015–2019	Bill Blair
