= Molard =

Molard may refer to:

- Jackie Molard, French musician, important figure in traditional Breton music
- Mount Richard-Molard, a mountain along the border of Côte d'Ivoire and Guinea in West Africa
- Saint-Étienne-le-Molard, a commune in the Loire department in central France

== See also ==
- Mollard (disambiguation)
