= Stuart Burton (politician) =

Canadian politician (1877–1941)

Mayor of Regina
- In office 1923–1924
- Preceded by: James Grassick
- Succeeded by: William E. Mason

Personal details
- Born: June 8, 1877 Lindsay, Ontario
- Died: December 30, 1941 (aged 64) Regina, Saskatchewan
- Occupation: wholesale grocer

Stewart Coulter Burton (June 8, 1877 – December 30, 1941) was a wholesale grocer and political figure in Saskatchewan, Canada. He was mayor of Regina from 1923 to 1924.

He was born in Lindsay, Ontario, the son of Alex Burton and Janey Coulter, and was educated in Midland and Lindsay. He was recruited by the Canadian Pacific Railway in 1892. In 1903, he was hired by the firm of Cameron & Heap, wholesale grocers, in Kenora. Burton was sent to a new branch in Regina in 1907 as manager. In 1909, he married Helen Pope, the daughter of James Colledge Pope. Burton became manager of the Saskatchewan Co-operative Creameries in 1929. He was chairman of the board for the Regina General Hospital and served on the first public library board in Regina.
