= Mollard (surname) =

Mollard is a surname. Notable people with the name include:

- Didier Mollard (born 1969), French ski jumper
- Emile Mollard (1895–1991), French general and resistance fighter
- Georges Mollard (1902–1986), French Olympic sailor
- Tikhon Mollard (born 1966), American Eastern Orthodox bishop and the Primate of the Orthodox Church in America
- William Mollard (1855–1931), Canadian politician; mayor of Regina, Saskatchewan, 1900–1901
- Marie Karoline von Fuchs-Mollard (1675–1754), French countess and governess of Maria Theresa of Austria
