= Regina Wascana Plains =

Provincial electoral district in Saskatchewan, Canada

Coordinates: 50°37′N 104°27′W

Saskatchewan electoral district

Provincial electoral district
- Legislature: Legislative Assembly of Saskatchewan
MLA
Brent Blakley
New Democratic
- District created: 1991
- First contested: 1991
- Last contested: 2024

Demographics
- Electors: 15,809
- Census division: Division 6
- Census subdivision: Regina

Regina Wascana Plains is a provincial electoral district for the Legislative Assembly of Saskatchewan, Canada. At different points in time, this district included the Regina neighbourhoods of University Park, University Park East, Arcola East-South Side, Varsity Park, Wood Meadows, Woodland Grove, Wascana View, Wascana Crescents, and Wascana Park. It also includes the town of White City.

The riding was expanded to a mixed urban/rural setup before the 1995 general election, taking in exurban areas generally east of the city, including the towns of White City and Pilot Butte. The riding was reconfigured back to a strictly urban riding for the 2024 general election; much of the rural territory transferred to White City-Qu'appelle.

== Members of the Legislative Assembly ==
Regina Wascana Plains
| Legislature | Years | Member | Party |
|---|---|---|---|
Riding created from Regina Dewdney and Regina Wascana
| 22nd | 1991–1995 | Doreen Hamilton | New Democratic |
| 23rd | 1995–1999 | Doreen Hamilton | New Democratic |
| 24th | 1999–2003 | Doreen Hamilton | New Democratic |
| 25th | 2003–2007 | Doreen Hamilton | New Democratic |
| 26th | 2007–2011 | Christine Tell | Saskatchewan |
| 27th | 2011–2016 | Christine Tell | Saskatchewan |
| 28th | 2016–2020 | Christine Tell | Saskatchewan |
| 29th | 2020–2024 | Christine Tell | Saskatchewan |
| 30th | 2024–present | Brent Blakley | New Democratic |

== Election results ==
2024 Saskatchewan general election
| Party | Candidate | Votes | % | ±% |
|---|---|---|---|---|
| New Democratic | Brent Blakley | 4,696 | 48.58 | +13.88 |
| Saskatchewan | Christine Tell | 4,103 | 42.44 | -19.36 |
| Saskatchewan United | Dustin Plett | 414 | 4.28 | |
| Progressive Conservative | Larry Buchinski | 356 | 3.68 | |
| Green | Bo Chen | 98 | 1.01 | -1.19 |
| Total valid votes | | 9,667 | 99.40 | |
| Total rejected ballots | | 58 | 0.60 | -0.18 |
| Turnout | | 9,725 | 64.77 | |
| Eligible voters | | 15,015 | | |
Source: Elections Saskatchewan
| New Democratic gain | | Swing | | |

2020 provincial election redistributed results
| Party | % |
|---|---|
| Saskatchewan | 61.8 |
| New Democratic | 34.7 |
| Green | 2.2 |
| Others | 1.3 |

2020 Saskatchewan general election
| Party | Candidate | Votes | % | ±% |
|---|---|---|---|---|
| Saskatchewan | Christine Tell | 7,209 | 63.79 | -1.75 |
| New Democratic | Mike Sinclair | 3,619 | 32.03 | +4.93 |
| Green | Sonja Doyle | 248 | 2.20 | +0.56 |
| Independent | Nestor Mryglod | 224 | 1.98 | * |
| Total valid votes | | 11,300 | 99.22 | |
| Total rejected ballots | | 89 | 0.78 | – |
| Turnout | | 11,389 | – | – |
| Eligible voters | | – | | |
| Saskatchewan hold | | Swing | | – |
Source: Elections Saskatchewan

2016 Saskatchewan general election
| Party | Candidate | Votes | % | ±% |
|---|---|---|---|---|
| Saskatchewan | Christine Tell | 6,107 | 65.54 | -3.76 |
| New Democratic | Kaytlyn Criddle | 2,525 | 27.10 | +0.21 |
| Liberal | Gulraiz Tariq | 287 | 3.08 | - |
| Progressive Conservative | Allen Mryglod | 245 | 2.62 | +0.61 |
| Green | Jeremy O'Connor | 153 | 1.64 | -0.36 |
| Total valid votes | | 9,317 | 100.0 | |
| Eligible voters | | – | | |
| Saskatchewan hold | | Swing | | – |
Source: Elections Saskatchewan

2011 Saskatchewan general election
| Party | Candidate | Votes | % | ±% |
|---|---|---|---|---|
| Saskatchewan | Christine Tell | 7,460 | 69.30 | +16.56 |
| NDP | Pat Maze | 2,895 | 26.89 | -4.39 |
| Green | Bill Clary | 215 | 2.00 | +0.46 |
| Prog. Conservative | Roy Gaebel | 195 | 1.81 | - |
| Total | | 10,765 | 100.00 | |

2007 Saskatchewan general election
| Party | Candidate | Votes | % | ±% |
|---|---|---|---|---|
| Saskatchewan | Christine Tell | 5,818 | 52.74 | +14.99 |
| NDP | Tyler Forrest | 3,450 | 31.28 | -12.10 |
| Liberal | Joe Stroeder | 1,593 | 14.44 | -3.92 |
| Green | Jim Elliott | 170 | 1.54 | +1.03 |
| Total | | 11,031 | 100.00 | |

2003 Saskatchewan general election
| Party | Candidate | Votes | % | ±% |
|---|---|---|---|---|
| NDP | Doreen E. Hamilton | 3,951 | 43.38 | +3.14 |
| Saskatchewan | Dan Thibault | 3,438 | 37.75 | -1.21 |
| Liberal | Frank William Proto | 1,672 | 18.36 | -2.44 |
| New Green | John Keen | 47 | 0.51 | * |
| Total | | 9,108 | 100.00 | |

1999 Saskatchewan general election
| Party | Candidate | Votes | % | ±% |
|---|---|---|---|---|
| NDP | Doreen E. Hamilton | 3,758 | 40.24 | -7.56 |
| Saskatchewan | Dan Thibault | 3,639 | 38.96 | * |
| Liberal | Adam Niesner | 1,943 | 20.80 | -22.85 |
| Total | | 9,340 | 100.00 | |

1995 Saskatchewan general election
| Party | Candidate | Votes | % | ±% |
|---|---|---|---|---|
| NDP | Doreen E. Hamilton | 3,862 | 47.80 | +1.40 |
| Liberal | Leslie Anderson-Stodalka | 3,527 | 43.65 | +12.05 |
| Prog. Conservative | Bonnie Krajewski | 691 | 8.55 | -13.45 |
| Total | | 8,080 | 100.00 | |

1991 Saskatchewan general election
| Party | Candidate | Votes | % | ±% |
|---|---|---|---|---|
| NDP | Doreen E. Hamilton | 4,532 | 46.40 | +5.10 |
| Liberal | Cam McCannell | 3,086 | 31.60 | +14.65 |
| Prog. Conservative | Gordon Martin | 2,148 | 22.00 | -19.75 |
| Total | | 9,766 | 100.00 | |

== See also ==
- List of Saskatchewan provincial electoral districts
- List of Saskatchewan general elections
- Canadian provincial electoral districts
