= Henry Laird =

Canadian politician

Henry Willoughby Laird (January 4, 1868 – September 30, 1940) was a journalist, wholesale merchant and political figure in Saskatchewan, Canada. He sat for Regina division in the Senate of Canada from 1917 to 1940.

He was born in Port Dover, Ontario, the son of the Reverend William H. Laird and Elizabeth C. Burke, and was educated at the Jarvis Street Collegiate Institute and the University of Toronto. Laird worked as a journalist for ten years, spending three years as a press correspondent in the Ontario legislature and Canadian House of Commons. He married Lillian Blanche Defoe in 1888.

In 1901, he came west to serve as private secretary to Frederick W. A. G. Haultain. After leaving that position, he then established a wholesale and distribution business in Regina, the first wholesale business established there. He was Mayor of Regina in 1904 and 1905. Laird ran unsuccessfully for a seat in the provincial assembly in 1905 and 1908. He served overseas as a lieutenant-colonel in the Canadian Expeditionary Force during World War I. In 1920, he helped found the Equitable Life & Accident Insurance Company and served as its vice-president. He was also a director for the Northern Life Assurance Company of London and the Merchants Casualty of Waterloo Laird died in office at the age of 72.
