= Regina—Wascana =

Federal electoral district in Saskatchewan, Canada

Saskatchewan electoral district
- Interactive map of riding boundaries from the 2025 federal election
- Coordinates: 50.426°N 104.549°W

Federal electoral district
- Legislature: House of Commons
MP
Michael Kram
Conservative
- District created: 1987
- First contested: 1988
- Last contested: 2025
- District webpage: profile, map

Demographics
- Population (2021): 89,087
- Electors (2015): 55,497
- Area (km²): 61.90
- Pop. density (per km²): 1,439.2
- Census division: Regina
- Census subdivision: Regina (part)

Regina—Wascana (formerly Wascana) is a federal electoral district in Saskatchewan, Canada, that has been represented in the House of Commons of Canada since 1988.

== Geography ==
Most of the riding is within the provincial capital city of Regina, in southern Saskatchewan.

The riding is bordered on the south by Fifth Base Line; on the west by Albert Street; on the north-west by the Canadian Pacific Railway; on the north by Victoria Avenue; and on the east by Range Road 190.

The riding is bordered on the south by Moose Jaw—Lake Centre—Lanigan; on the west by Regina—Lewvan; and on the north and east by Regina—Qu'Appelle. The riding lost significant territory in the 2012 re-distribution to Moose Jaw—Lake Centre—Lanigan and Souris—Moose Mountain, but lost very little population; the remaining territory outside of the Regina city limits was lost to Moose Jaw-Lake Centre-Lanigan in the 2023 redistribution.

== Demographics ==
Panethnic groups in Regina—Wascana (2011−2021)
Panethnic group	2021		2016		2011	
Panethnic group	Pop.	%	Pop.	%	Pop.	%
European (Note: Statistic includes all persons that did not make up part of a visible minority or an indigenous identity.)	55,025	62.92%	57,815	70.05%	59,840	79.18%
South Asian	7,970	9.11%	5,315	6.44%	2,135	2.83%
Indigenous	7,560	8.64%	6,410	7.77%	5,355	7.09%
Southeast Asian (Note: Statistic includes total responses of "Filipino" and "Southeast Asian" under visible minority section on census.)	5,180	5.92%	3,930	4.76%	3,035	4.02%
African	4,320	4.94%	2,855	3.46%	1,200	1.59%
East Asian (Note: Statistic includes total responses of "Chinese", "Korean", and "Japanese" under visible minority section on census.)	4,315	4.93%	4,050	4.91%	2,585	3.42%
Middle Eastern (Note: Statistic includes total responses of "West Asian" and "Arab" under visible minority section on census.)	1,630	1.86%	1,055	1.28%	580	0.77%
Latin American	590	0.67%	490	0.59%	530	0.7%
Other/multiracial (Note: Statistic includes total responses of "Visible minority, n.i.e." and "Multiple visible minorities" under visible minority section on census.)	855	0.98%	610	0.74%	315	0.42%
Total responses	87,450	98.16%	82,530	98.07%	75,570	97.88%
Total population	89,087	100%	84,153	100%	77,208	100%
Notes: Totals greater than 100% due to multiple origin responses. Demographics based on 2012 Canadian federal electoral redistribution riding boundaries.

According to the 2016 Canadian census

Languages: 78.3% English, 2.3% Mandarin, 2.0% Tagalog, 1.6% French, 1.3% Punjabi, 1.3% German, 1.1% Urdu, 1.1% Cantonese
Religions (2011): 68.3% Christian (31.3% Catholic, 12.0% United Church, 6.6% Lutheran, 3.2% Anglican, 2.2% Baptist, 1.5% Christian Orthodox, 1.2% Pentecostal, 10.3% Other), 2.0% Muslim, 1.3% Buddhist, 1.1% Hind, 25.8 No religion
Median income (2015): $42,192
Average income (2015): $55,770

== History ==
The electoral district was created in 1988 from Regina East, Regina West and Assiniboia. From 1993 to 2019, Ralph Goodale, who served as Minister of Finance and Minister of Public Safety, was the Member of Parliament. Between 2004 and 2015 (for the 38th through 41st Canadian Parliaments inclusive), Goodale was the only non-Conservative MP to serve a constituency in Saskatchewan. Along with Winnipeg North, Wascana was one of only two seats retained by the Liberals in the Prairie Provinces in the 2011 election.

=== Historical boundaries ===
1987 representation order

1996 representation order

2013 representation order

2023 representation order

== Members of Parliament ==
This riding has elected the following members of the House of Commons of Canada:

Parliament	Years	Member	Party
Regina—Wascana; Riding created from Assiniboia, Regina East, and Regina West
34th	1988–1993	Larry Schneider	Progressive Conservative
35th	1993–1997	Ralph Goodale	Liberal
Wascana
36th	1997–2000	Ralph Goodale	Liberal
37th	2000–2004	Ralph Goodale	Liberal
38th	2004–2006	Ralph Goodale	Liberal
39th	2006–2008	Ralph Goodale	Liberal
40th	2008–2011	Ralph Goodale	Liberal
41st	2011–2015	Ralph Goodale	Liberal
Regina—Wascana
42nd	2015–2019	Ralph Goodale	Liberal
43rd	2019–2021	Michael Kram	Conservative
44th	2021–2025	Michael Kram	Conservative
45th	2025–present	Michael Kram	Conservative

=== Current member of Parliament ===
Its Member of Parliament is Michael Kram. He was first elected in the 2019 Canadian federal election, after having run and finishing second in the 2015 Canadian federal election. He is a member of the Conservative Party of Canada.

== Election results ==
Graph of election results in Regina—Wascana (minor parties that never got 2% of the vote or didn't run consistently are omitted)

=== Regina—Wascana: 2015–present ===
2025 Canadian federal election
** Preliminary results — Not yet official **
Party	Candidate	Votes	%	±%	Expenditures
Conservative	Michael Kram	22,072	50.08	+0.18	
Liberal	Jeffrey Walters	19,252	43.68	+16.76	
New Democratic	Kaitlyn Stadnyk	2,138	4.85	–13.22	
People's	Peter Bruce	326	0.74	–2.76	
Green	Kimberly Epp	289	0.66	–0.95	
Total valid votes/expense limit		44,077	69.59		
Total rejected ballots		294	0.66		
Turnout		44,371	70.06		
Eligible voters		63,339			
Conservative hold		Swing		–8.15	
Source: Elections Canada

2021 federal election redistributed results
Party	Vote	%
Conservative	19,258	49.90
Liberal	10,388	26.92
New Democratic	6,974	18.07
People's	1,352	3.50
Green	622	1.61

2021 Canadian federal election
Party	Candidate	Votes	%	±%	Expenditures
Conservative	Michael Kram	19,261	49.9	+0.47	$80,923.17
Liberal	Sean McEachern	10,390	26.9	-6.71	$86,519.29
New Democratic	Erin Hidlebaugh	6,975	18.1	+5.39	$3,062.34
People's	Mario Milanovski	1,352	3.5	+2.51	$2,039.18
Green	Victor Lau	622	1.6	-1.3	$2,714.95
Total valid votes/expense limit		38,600	99.3	–	$102,892.46
Total rejected ballots		291	0.07		
Turnout		38,891	63.9		
Eligible voters		60,858			
Source: Elections Canada

2019 Canadian federal election
Party	Candidate	Votes	%	±%	Expenditures
Conservative	Michael Kram	22,418	49.43	+19.16	$74,982.33
Liberal	Ralph Goodale	15,242	33.61	-21.52	$92,046.46
New Democratic	Hailey Clark	5,801	12.79	+0.24	none listed
Green	Tamela Friesen	1,316	2.90	+0.85	$2,193.36
People's	Mario Milanovski	450	0.99	-	$4,344.47
Independent	Evangeline Godron	128	0.28	-	none listed
Total valid votes/expense limit		45,355	99.25		
Total rejected ballots		344	0.75	+0.34	
Turnout		45,699	75.60	+0.99	
Eligible voters		60,451			
Conservative gain from Liberal		Swing		+20.34	
Source: Elections Canada

2015 Canadian federal election
Party	Candidate	Votes	%	±%	Expenditures
Liberal	Ralph Goodale	23,552	55.13	+13.37	$96,786.47
Conservative	Michael Kram	12,931	30.27	-5.44	$89,000.81
New Democratic	April Bourgeois	5,362	12.55	-7.53	$21,735.49
Green	Frances Simonson	878	2.06	-0.4	$4,601.01
Total valid votes/expense limit		42,723	99.59		$193,043.93
Total rejected ballots		176	0.41	–	
Turnout		42,889	74.60	–	
Eligible voters		57,504			
Liberal hold		Swing		+9.41	
Source: Elections Canada

2011 federal election redistributed results
Party	Vote	%
Liberal	15,271	41.76
Conservative	13,056	35.71
New Democratic	7,341	20.08
Green	898	2.46

=== Wascana: 1997–2015 ===
2011 Canadian federal election: Wascana
Party	Candidate	Votes	%	±%	Expenditures
Liberal	Ralph Goodale	15,823	40.8	-5.2	$65,366
Conservative	Ian Shields	14,291	36.9	+2.3	$74,976
New Democratic	Marc Spooner	7,681	19.8	+5.1	$25,821
Green	Bill Clary	954	2.5	-2.1	$755
Total valid votes		38,749	100.0	–	
Total rejected ballots		106	0.3	0.0	
Turnout		38,855	68.1	+3.9	
Eligible voters		57,034	–	–	

2008 Canadian federal election: Wascana
Party	Candidate	Votes	%	±%	Expenditures
Liberal	Ralph Goodale	17,028	46.0	-5.7	$66,057
Conservative	Michelle Hunter	12,798	34.6	+4.4	$66,686
New Democratic	Stephen Moore	5,418	14.7	+0.2	$19,393
Green	George Wooldridge	1,706	4.6	+1.1	$4,204
Total valid votes/expense limit		36,950	100.0	$77,030	
Total rejected ballots		121	0.3	+0.1	
Turnout		37,071	64.2	-6	

2006 Canadian federal election: Wascana
Party	Candidate	Votes	%	±%	Expenditures
Liberal	Ralph Goodale	20,666	51.8	-5.4	$66,648
Conservative	Brad Farquhar	11,990	30.0	+5.8	$67,579
New Democratic	Helen Yum	5,880	14.7	-1.3	$30,123
Green	Nigel Taylor	1,378	3.5	+0.9	$1,653
Total valid votes		39,914	100.0		
Total rejected ballots		94	0.2	0.0	
Turnout		40,008	70	+7	

2004 Canadian federal election: Wascana
Party	Candidate	Votes	%	±%	Expenditures
Liberal	Ralph Goodale	20,567	57.2	+16.0	$43,226
Conservative	Doug Cryer	8,709	24.2	-11.9	$57,802
New Democratic	Erin M.K. Weir	5,771	16.0	-5.5	$29,783
Green	Darcy Robilliard	928	2.6		
Total valid votes		35,975	100.0		
Total rejected ballots		80	0.2	-0.1	
Turnout		36,055	63.1	+0.9	

Note: Conservative vote is compared to the Canadian Alliance vote in 2000 election.

2000 Canadian federal election: Wascana
Party	Candidate	Votes	%	±%	Expenditures
Liberal	Ralph Goodale	14,244	41.2	-0.7	$56,685
Alliance	James Rybchuk	12,492	36.1	+7.2	$59,667
New Democratic	Garth Ormiston	7,446	21.5	-6.8	$58,098
Canadian Action	Wayne Gilmer	401	1.2	+0.4	$1,619
Total valid votes		34,583	100.0		
Total rejected ballots		98	0.3	-0.1	
Turnout		34,681	62.3	-4.0	

Note: Canadian Alliance vote is compared to the Reform vote in 1997 election.

1997 Canadian federal election: Wascana
Party	Candidate	Votes	%	±%	Expenditures
Liberal	Ralph Goodale	14,077	41.9	-2.4	$54,021
New Democratic	John Burton	9,530	28.4	+7.2	$37,942
Reform	Glen Blager	7,261	21.6	+5.9	$39,285
Progressive Conservative	Michael Morris	2,477	7.4	-8.4	$18,266
Canadian Action	Walter P. Sigda	264	0.8	–	$1,822
Total valid votes		33,609	100.0		
Total rejected ballots		136	0.4		
Turnout		33,745	66.2		

=== Regina—Wascana: 1988–1997 ===
1993 Canadian federal election
Party	Candidate	Votes	%	±%
Liberal	Ralph Goodale	19,555	44.3	+11.5
New Democratic	Donna Shire	9,323	21.1	-11.8
Progressive Conservative	Larry Schneider	6,943	15.7	-18.3
Reform	Andrew Jackson	6,935	15.7	–
National	John Keen	734	1.7	–
Natural Law	C. Angus Hunt	228	0.5	–
Christian Heritage	Hugh Owens	192	0.4	–
Independent	Barry James Farr	185	0.4	–
Canada Party	Walter P. Sigda	64	0.1	–
Total valid votes		44,159	100.0	

1988 Canadian federal election
Party	Candidate	Votes	%
Progressive Conservative	Larry Schneider	15,339	34.0
New Democratic	Dickson Bailey	14,829	32.9
Liberal	Ralph Goodale	14,804	32.8
Communist	Kimball Cariou	76	0.2
Libertarian	Ian Christopher Madsen	65	0.1
Total valid votes		45,113	100.0

== See also ==
- List of Canadian electoral districts
- Historical federal electoral districts of Canada
