= Christine Tell =

Canadian politician

The Honourable Christine Tell ECS

Member of the Saskatchewan Legislative Assembly for Regina Wascana Plains
- In office November 7, 2007 – October 1, 2024
- Preceded by: Doreen Hamilton
- Succeeded by: Brent Blakley

Personal details
- Born: Regina, Saskatchewan, Canada
- Party: Saskatchewan Party
- Occupation: Police Officer

Christine Tell is a Canadian politician. She represented the electoral district of Regina Wascana Plains in the Legislative Assembly of Saskatchewan from 2007 to 2024 as a member of the Saskatchewan Party.

== Early life and career ==
Tell was born and raised in Regina, graduating from Miller Comprehensive High School and then receiving a psychiatric nursing diploma. After a short time working as a psychiatric nurse, she joined the Saskatoon Police Service and graduated from the Saskatchewan Police College. She worked for three years in Saskatoon before returning to her hometown and joining the Regina Police Service in 1983. She rose to the rank of sergeant and took an unpaid leave of absence to seek election in May 2007.

She served as president of the Regina Police Association for six years and was the first female in Canada to head the police association of a major service.

== Political career ==
Tell was first elected as a member of the Legislative Assembly (MLA) in the 2007 provincial election, after which the Saskatchewan Party formed a majority government. Tell was re-elected in 2011, 2016, and 2020.

Tell has been a cabinet member since she was first elected, serving in the cabinets of both Brad Wall and Scott Moe, except for a two year period from 2010 to 2012. Tell's time in cabinet includes nearly seven years in charge of corrections and policing over two stints with the portfolio.

During Tell's first stint in charge of corrections, the government was questioned over a 2013 decision to deny an order-in-council to allow the auditor general access to youth custody records as part of an effort to assess the effectiveness of young offender rehabilitation programs. Tell argued that it would have been more appropriate for the auditor to obtain a court order; the auditor decided against pursuing such an order due to the cost of the court process.

In January 2020, a CBC investigation revealed that a company owned by Tell's son was renting a building at the Global Transportation Hub from the Saskatchewan government below market value and at a financial loss for the province. Tell requested a conflict of interest review from the Conflict of Interest Commissioner, and the Opposition New Democratic Party called for an investigation into the arrangement and highlighted the need to strengthen the province's conflict of interest rules. Tell was cleared of wrongdoing by the commissioner later that month.

In January 2021, Tell admitted to traveling to California in the fall of 2020 despite the closure of the border between Canada and the United States to nonessential travel and public health advisories to avoid unnecessary travel due to the COVID-19 pandemic. Saskatchewan was seeing record case numbers at the time and the government had asked the public to avoid nonessential travel.

In November 2020, the provincial prison system began seeing significant outbreaks of COVID-19, which led to criticism for a lack of preparation and calls from prisoners' advocates and the Opposition for the early or temporary release of remanded and non-violent inmates to mitigate the situation. In response, Tell said the province would not release any inmates and that although it was not clear how the virus got into correctional facilities, the government would not be investigating the situation. In January 2021, inmates at the Saskatoon Correctional Centre and Prince Albert's Pine Grove Correctional Centre began a hunger strike in an effort to get Tell to resign her cabinet position. Prisoner advocate Cory Cardinal demanded an apology, stating that, "her refusal, her negligence, her dismissive attitude... exacerbated the outbreak by not taking proactive measures." A prisoners' rights advocate stated that Tell "obviously has failed to do her job." On January 15, a petition calling for Tell's resignation with more than 1,700 signatures was presented to the Legislature. Tell responded that the outbreak was not a "get out of jail free card", and that the government had increased sanitation and quarantine measures to try and mitigate correctional centre outbreaks.

In 2022, Tell unveiled plans to introduce a new police force, the Saskatchewan Marshals Service (SMS), expected to be operational with 70 officers by 2026. The service, expected to cost the province $20 million annually, is expected to supplement the RCMP in the province by conducting "proactive investigations", primarily focused on rural and remote areas, and with "indirect oversight" provided by the Ministry of Corrections and Policing. The Opposition criticized the lack of independence for the new service, while the union representing RCMP officers called the new force "completely unnecessary". First Nations leaders also questioned the plan and in particular a lack of consultation with Indigenous communities in its formation.

Also in 2022, Tell shepherded the passage of Bill 70, which overhauled security in and around the Legislative Building. While for decades the Speaker of the House appointed a serjeant-at-arms responsible for security, Bill 70 left that position in charge of the Legislative Assembly only, with the government appointing its own security director for the Legislative grounds. The bill raised concerns about politicizing security, while Terry Quinn resigned as serjeant-at-arms and alleged that alleged harassment and defamation by the government, including Tell.

In a cabinet shuffle on August 29, 2023, Tell was named the Minister of Environment.

In the 2024 provincial election, Tell lost her seat to Brent Blakley of the New Democratic Party.

== Personal life ==
Tell is currently married to Gary Massier and has two children with her first husband. Along with caucus colleague Laura Ross, Tell hosts an annual leadership event for women and girls.

== Electoral results ==
2024 Saskatchewan general election: Regina Wascana Plains
Party	Candidate	Votes	%
New Democratic	Brent Blakley	4,696	48.58
Saskatchewan	Christine Tell	4,103	42.44
Saskatchewan United	Dustin Plett	414	4.28
Progressive Conservative	Larry Buchinski	356	3.68
Green	Bo Chen	98	1.01
Total		9,667	99.99
Source: Elections Saskatchewan

2020 Saskatchewan general election: Regina Wascana Plains
Party	Candidate	Votes	%
Saskatchewan	Christine Tell	7,209	63.79
New Democratic	Mike Sinclair	3,619	32.03
Green	Sonja Doyle	248	2.20
Independent	Nestor Mryglod	224	1.98
Total		11,300	100.0
Source: Elections Saskatchewan

2016 Saskatchewan general election: Regina Wascana Plains
Party	Candidate	Votes	%
Saskatchewan	Christine Tell	6,107	65.54
New Democratic	Kaytlyn Criddle	2,525	27.10
Liberal	Gulraiz Tariq	287	3.08
Progressive Conservative	Allen Mryglod	245	2.62
Green	Jeremy O'Connor	153	1.64
Total		9,317	100.0
Source: Saskatchewan Archives - Election Results by Electoral Division; Elections Saskatchewan

2011 Saskatchewan general election: Regina Wascana Plains
Party	Candidate	Votes	%
Saskatchewan	Christine Tell	7,460	69.30
New Democratic	Pat Maze	2,895	26.89
Green	Bill Clary	215	2.00
Progressive Conservative	Roy Gaebel	195	1.81
Total		10,765	100.0
Source: Saskatchewan Archives - Election Results by Electoral Division

2007 Saskatchewan general election: Regina Wascana Plains
Party	Candidate	Votes	%
Saskatchewan	Christine Tell	5,818	52.74
New Democratic	Tyler Forrest	3,450	31.28
Liberal	Joe Stroeder	1,593	14.44
Green	Jim Elliott	170	1.54
Total		11,031	100.0
Source: Saskatchewan Archives - Election Results by Electoral Division

== Cabinet positions ==
Saskatchewan provincial government of Scott Moe
Cabinet posts (2)
Predecessor	Office	Successor
Dana Skoropad	Minister of Environment; August 29, 2023 – November 7, 2024	Travis Keisig
Don Morgan	Minister of Corrections and Policing; February 2, 2018 – August 29, 2023	Paul Merriman
Saskatchewan provincial government of Brad Wall
Cabinet posts (4)
Predecessor	Office	Successor
Jennifer Campeau	Minister of Central Services; August 23, 2016 – February 2, 2018	Ken Cheveldayoff
Yogi Huyghebaert	Minister of Corrections and Policing; May 25, 2012 – August 23, 2016	Ministry Abolished
Dan D'Autremont	Minister of Government Services; May 29, 2009 – June 29, 2010	Laura Ross
Sandra Morin	Minister of Tourism, Parks, Culture and Sport; November 21, 2007 – May 29, 2009	Dustin Duncan
