= Brent Blakley =

Canadian politician

Brent Blakley MLA

Member of the Saskatchewan Legislative Assembly for Regina Wascana Plains
- Incumbent
- Assumed office October 28, 2024
- Preceded by: Christine Tell

Shadow Minister of Social Services
- Incumbent
- Assumed office November 13, 2024
- Preceded by: Meara Conway

Personal details
- Party: Saskatchewan NDP

Brent Blakley is a Canadian politician who was elected to the Legislative Assembly of Saskatchewan in the 2024 general election, representing Regina Wascana Plains as a member of the New Democratic Party.

Blakley unseated Christine Tell, a Saskatchewan Party cabinet minister who had held the seat since the party took power in the 2007 general election.

Blakley attended the University of Regina and holds an education degree. He has 35 years of experience as a teacher in numerous grades and schools, most recently at Sheldon-Williams Collegiate. His background also includes volunteering as a basketball and football coach, including with the Regina Riot.

He is married to the Rev. Carla Blakley, bishop of the Eastern Synod of the Evangelical Lutheran Church in Canada.

== Electoral record ==
2024 Saskatchewan general election: Regina Wascana Plains
Party	Candidate	Votes	%	±%
New Democratic	Brent Blakley	4,696	48.58	+13.88
Saskatchewan	Christine Tell	4,103	42.44	-19.36
Saskatchewan United	Dustin Plett	414	4.28	
Progressive Conservative	Larry Buchinski	356	3.68	
Green	Bo Chen	98	1.01	-1.19
Total valid votes		9,667	99.40	
Total rejected ballots		58	0.60	-0.18
Turnout		9,725	64.77	
Eligible voters		15,015		
Source: Elections Saskatchewan
New Democratic gain		Swing		
