= Alban Ellison =

Canadian mayor (1889–1974)

Mayor of Regina
- In office 1936–1939
- Preceded by: Cornelius Rink
- Succeeded by: James Grassick

Personal details
- Born: January 26, 1889 Wortley, England
- Died: November 27, 1974 (aged 85) New Westminster, British Columbia
- Occupation: lawyer

Alban Cedric Ellison (January 26, 1889 – November 27, 1974) was an English-born lawyer and political figure in Saskatchewan, Canada. He was mayor of Regina from 1936 to 1939.

Ellison was elected to Regina City Council as a Labour Party councillor in 1932, 1934 and 1936. He was defeated by James Grassick when he ran for reelection in 1939 in part due to allegations of Communist influences on the city council. Ellison served in the navy during World War I and World War II. He authored a number of mystery stories. Ellison served for many years as registrar at the Regina courthouse. In 1940, he ran unsuccessfully for a seat in the House of Commons in the riding of Wood Mountain. He died at New Westminster, British Columbia in 1974.
