= Pat Fiacco =

Canadian politician

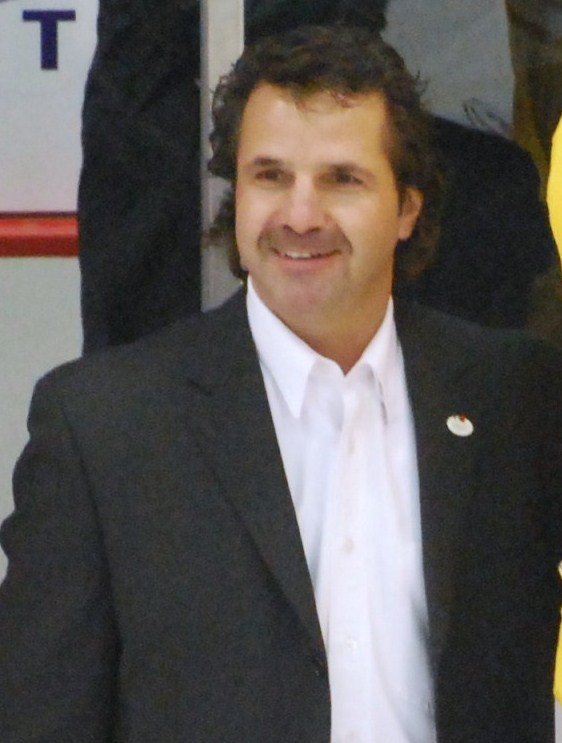

Mayor of Regina, Saskatchewan
- In office 2000–2012
- Preceded by: Douglas R. Archer
- Succeeded by: Michael Fougere

Personal details
- Born: Regina, Saskatchewan
- Occupation: Director of Strategic Business Development at DirectWest

Pasquale Fiacco is the former mayor of Regina, the capital city of Saskatchewan, Canada, from 2000 to 2012. In June 2014, he became president and chief executive officer of the Hospitals of Regina Foundation, after having been the CEO of Tourism Saskatchewan since November 2012. On January 27, 2015, it was announced Fiacco had stepped down from his position with Hospitals of Regina Foundation, effective January 21, 2015. He was born and raised in Regina.

== Personal history ==
Fiacco worked at the 2004 Athens Olympics as the Canadian referee and judge for the boxing event, and has held provincial and Canadian amateur boxing championships, such as Canada's amateur bantamweight crown in 1980. He has also was the Head Official of Boxing Canada. Ken Goff's son George Goff and Fiacco implemented the Ken Goff Memorial Boxing Classic, in memory of Ken Goff.

Fiacco has also contributed to the Canadian Olympic Committee, Telemiracle 22, the Big Valley Jamboree, the Ken Goff Memorial Boxing Classic, Sask Sport and Hockey Regina.

== Political career ==
Fiacco was elected mayor in 2000, as a political newcomer. He received an endorsement from the Regina Police Association by then union president Troy Hagen after the number of police officers working for the Regina Police Service decreased by 31 during the mayoralty of Doug Archer. Fiacco was elected by acclamation in 2003, and re-elected on October 25, 2006. On October 28, 2009, Fiacco was elected to his fourth term. He did not run for a fifth term, and was succeeded as mayor by former councillor Michael Fougere.

He is a member on the Regina Regional Economic Development Authority (RREDA); the Mayor's Task Force on Regina's Future; the Regina Board of Police Commissioners; the Regina Crime Prevention Commission; the Wascana Centre Authority; the Big City Mayors’ Caucus; the Canadian Capital Cities Organization and the Saskatchewan City Mayor's Caucus.

On November 28, 2012, Fiacco received the President's Community Award from the University of Regina in recognition of service to the province of Saskatchewan.
