= Les Hammond =

Canadian accountant and politician

Mayor of Regina
- In office 1954–1956
- Preceded by: Gordon Burton Grant
- Succeeded by: Thomas Cowburn

Personal details
- Born: March 22, 1908 Saskatoon, Saskatchewan
- Died: December 31, 1998 (aged 90) Regina, Saskatchewan
- Occupation: accountant

Leslie Herbert Hammond (March 22, 1908 – December 31, 1998) was an accountant and politician in Saskatchewan, Canada. He served as mayor of Regina from 1954 to 1956.

He was born in Saskatoon, Saskatchewan and came to Regina in 1935. Hammond worked for Simpsons-Sears as an accountant. He was president of the Regina Jaycees. He was also a director and chairman of the finance committee for the local Victorian Order of Nurses. He was a member of Regina city council from 1947 to 1952 and from 1971 to 1973. He died at the age of 90 in Regina in 1998.

Hammond ran unsuccessfully for the Regina Centre seat in the provincial assembly in 1975.

Hammond Road in Regina was named in his honour.
