= Ken Black (architect) =

Canadian architect

Ken Black

Henry Kenneth Black (19 May 1912 - 4 July 1993) was a Canadian architect. Practising between 1935 and 1972, Black formed his own firm in Regina, Saskatchewan in 1949 and in that city became one of the first and most prolific practitioners of the mid-century modern style.

== Biography ==
=== Family history ===
Henry Kenneth Black was born in Regina, Saskatchewan on 19 May 1912. Ken was the first of five children of Henry Black (1875-1960) and Jennie Lenore Barker (1882-1950), his younger siblings being Charles, William, Elizabeth, and Thomas.

Henry Black was born on a farm near Kemptville, Ontario and worked in various businesses before moving to Kaslo, British Columbia in 1899, and then to Regina in 1903, where he opened a menswear store. Shortly after, Black began a career as a contractor and developer. In 1910 Black married Barker. Throughout the 1910s and 1920s black worked in the construction industry, operated a biscuit business, and participated in politics, serving as an alderman from 1915 to 1917 and 1923 to 1924, and mayor from 1917 to 1918. From 1931 to 1934 Black was the chairman of the Saskatchewan Relief Commission, and for this work he was made a Commander of the Order of the British Empire in 1935.

=== Birth ===
Ken Black was born just over a month before the devastating Regina Cyclone of 30 June 1912. At the time of his birth the Blacks were living in the Crescent Apartments at 1550 14th Avenue, and in 1915 moved into a house at 2322 St. John Street where they remained until 1921. In 1921 Henry built a new home for the family at 2310 College Avenue, which they moved into in 1922 and remained in until Jennie's death in 1950. As a young man Ken was a tennis star, winning both the singles and doubles provincial championships.

=== Education ===
In the fall of 1931 Ken moved to Toronto to study architecture under Eric Arthur at the University of Toronto. While at the U of T, Black played basketball and tennis for the school and was part of the Psi Upsilon fraternity. During the summer of 1934 he returned to Regina worked with the firm Storey and Van Egmond, and in the spring of 1935 graduated. After graduation Black moved to Swift Current, Saskatchewan to work as a construction engineer for the Prairie Farm Rehabilitation Administration (PFRA), designing water-control structures. In 1937 Black returned to Toronto and for a short time worked for the firm Chapman and Oxley, and in 1939 formed a short-lived partnership with John B. Parkin, who had graduated in the same class as Black. In the summer of 1941 Black returned to Regina where he remained for a year.

=== Navy ===
Following the outbreak of the Second World War in September 1939, Black enlisted in the Royal Canadian Navy in 1942. Having had stomach surgery shortly before then, Black was unable to fight and instead served as a Base Planning Officer in Ottawa, Ontario, working under Cecil Burgess and A. J. Hazelgrove. In January 1946 Black returned to Regina, and on 17 September of that same year he married Rhoda Jones (1913-1986), with whom he had three children: Walter, Kenneth, and Donald.

=== Architecture firm ===
Back in his home city, Black founded his own firm under the name of H. K. Black, Architect and Engineer. Early commissions included the Western Tractor Building and the Regina City Dairies Building. In short time Black became one of the province's most in-demand architects, specializing in schools and hospitals. In 1957 Black formed a partnership with Harry Larson (19??-1969) and Ken McMillan (1927-2009), calling the new firm Black Larson McMillan and Partners. Both men had graduated from the University of Manitoba, Larson in 1949 and McMillan in 1948. One of the firm's early projects was Regina's Financial Building. The seven-story office building was the city's first international-style structure employing a curtain wall. After completion, the firm rented the first floor of the building as its office. Throughout the firm's history it employed many of Regina's most prominent architects, including Grant Cumbers, Jim Varro, Jack Burton, Kiyoshi Izumi, Jim Sugiyama, Frank Moore, and Hendrik Grolle. Black retired from active practice in 1972, and remained a consultant until 1975.

=== Death ===
When Henry Black died in 1950, Ken and Rhoda moved into the home at 2370 Lorne Street, which Henry had been living in since Jennie death in 1950. Ken and Rhoda would remain there until her death in 1986. Ken Black died on 4 July 1993 at the age of 91, leaving behind a significant built legacy in the province of Saskatchewan. Black's architectural drawings are held at the Provincial Archives of Saskatchewan as part of his father's records, the "Henry Black fonds."

== Works ==
Name	City	Address	Year	Status
Union Hospital	Kamsack	341 Stewart Street	1948	
Union Hospital	Moose Jaw	455 Fairford Street East	1948	Demolished 2016
Lakeview United Church	Regina	3200 McCallum Avenue	1948	
Valley View Centre	Moose Jaw	7th Avenue South West	1955	
Financial Building	Regina	2101 Scarth Street	1959	Altered beyond recognition in 1992
Health and Welfare Building	Regina	3211 Albert Street	1959	Now called "Lloyd Place"
YMCA	Regina	2400 13th Avenue	1959	
Speers Funeral Home	Regina	2136 College Avenue	1960	
Murray Library	Saskatoon	3 Campus Drive	1968	
Income Tax Building	Regina	1955 Smith Street	1968	
Hudson's Bay Company Store	Regina	2150 11th Avenue	1968	

== Sources ==
- Black, Don. "Evolution to Modern Scale and Design: 1965 to 2011." In Worth Magazine. Volume 23, issue 1 (Spring 2011): pp. 10–15.
