= Hugh McGillivray =

Hugh McGillivray (ca 1875 – February 10, 1959) was a politician in Saskatchewan, Canada. He served as mayor of Regina from 1947 to 1948.

McGillivray was born to a family that homesteaded north of Pense, he served as the first reeve of Pense in 1913. McGillivray operated a hardware store in Pense. In 1920, he moved to Regina. McGillivray served on Regina city council from 1940 to 1946. He received the Order of the British Empire in 1946 for his service while chairman of the Veterans' Dependents Advisory Committee for southern Saskatchewan following World War II.

McGillivray was president of the Regina Exhibition Association in 1945.

He died in Regina at the age of 84.

McGillivray Crescent in Regina was named in his honour.
