= William Mollard =

Canadian politician (1855–1931)

13th Mayor of Regina, Saskatchewan
- In office 1900–1901
- Preceded by: John K. McInnis
- Succeeded by: Jacob W. Smith

Personal details
- Born: William Thomas Mollard; May 5, 1855 near Aurora, Province of Canada
- Died: May 4, 1931 (aged 75) Victoria, British Columbia, Canada
- Spouse: Margaret C. Stewart (m. 1889)
- Parent: James Mollard (father)
- Profession: Politician, contractor

William Thomas Mollard (May 5, 1855 – May 4, 1931) was a contractor and political figure in Saskatchewan, Canada. He was mayor of Regina from 1900 to 1901.

He was born near Aurora, Canada West, the son of James Mollard. He first worked as a carpenter in Winnipeg and came to Regina in 1882, where he worked in building and contracting. He operated in partnership with Charles Willoughby from 1894 to 1906. In 1889, he married Margaret C. Stewart. Mollard was named federal inspector of public works in Saskatchewan and Alberta. He served on the city council for Regina from 1898 to 1899. Mollard was a member of the public school board and served as its chairman. He died at the age of 75 in Victoria, British Columbia on May 4, 1931.
