= Michael Kram =

Canadian politician (born 1978)

Michael Kram MP
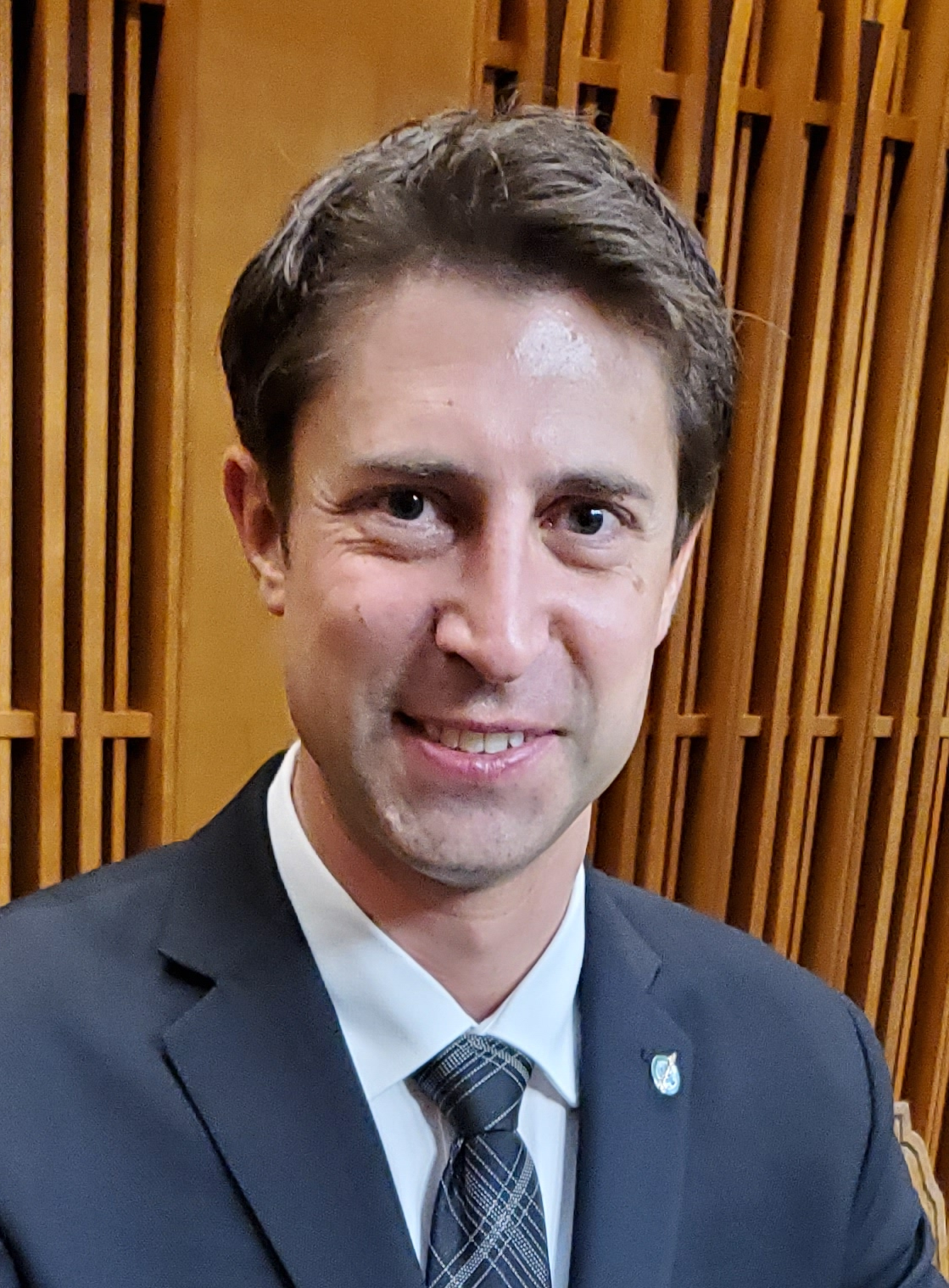
- Kram in 2019

Member of Parliament for Regina—Wascana
- Incumbent
- Assumed office October 21, 2019
- Preceded by: Ralph Goodale

Personal details
- Born: December 20, 1978 (age 47) Regina, Saskatchewan, Canada
- Party: Conservative
- Education: University of Regina (BA, BSc)

Michael Kram MP (born December 20, 1978) is a Canadian politician who was elected as a Conservative to represent the riding of Regina—Wascana in the House of Commons of Canada in the 2019 Canadian federal election.

== Personal life and education ==
Kram grew up and still resides in south Regina, Saskatchewan. His parents are both retired teachers and his grandparents were farmers. He graduated from Dr. Martin LeBoldus High School in Regina.

He has a Bachelor of Science degree majoring in computer science and a Bachelor of Arts degree majoring in economics. Both degrees are from the University of Regina. Kram also studied economics at Carleton University in Ottawa.

In interviews, Kram has often noted that becoming a Member of Parliament had been his dream since he was in elementary school.

In 2026, Kram married Rechel Capoquian.

== Early career ==
Before being elected to public office, Kram worked for 20 years in the information technology sector, including a number of contract positions with the Department of National Defence. He worked for over 17 years as a programmer/analyst with Paradigm Consulting, a Regina-based IT consulting firm. During this time, he developed software solutions for a mix of private sector, federal and provincial entities.

As a sideline, Kram worked as an extra and bit-part actor in a number of Canadian movies and TV shows, including Corner Gas: The Movie, Edge of War, A Dog Named Christmas and Crime Stories. His most extensive role was playing Detective Dominick Spinelli in the docu-drama series Crime Stories.

== Political career ==
=== 2015 federal election ===
Kram ran as the Conservative Party of Canada candidate in the constituency of Regina—Wascana in the 2015 Canadian federal election. He was defeated by incumbent long-time Liberal MP Ralph Goodale. While Kram was defeated by a margin of over 10,600 votes, his absolute vote was comparable to the results of Conservative candidates from the previous five elections. Conversely, the NDP and Green votes were lower than in previous elections, suggesting that the Liberal campaign had benefited from strategic voting.

=== 2019 federal election ===
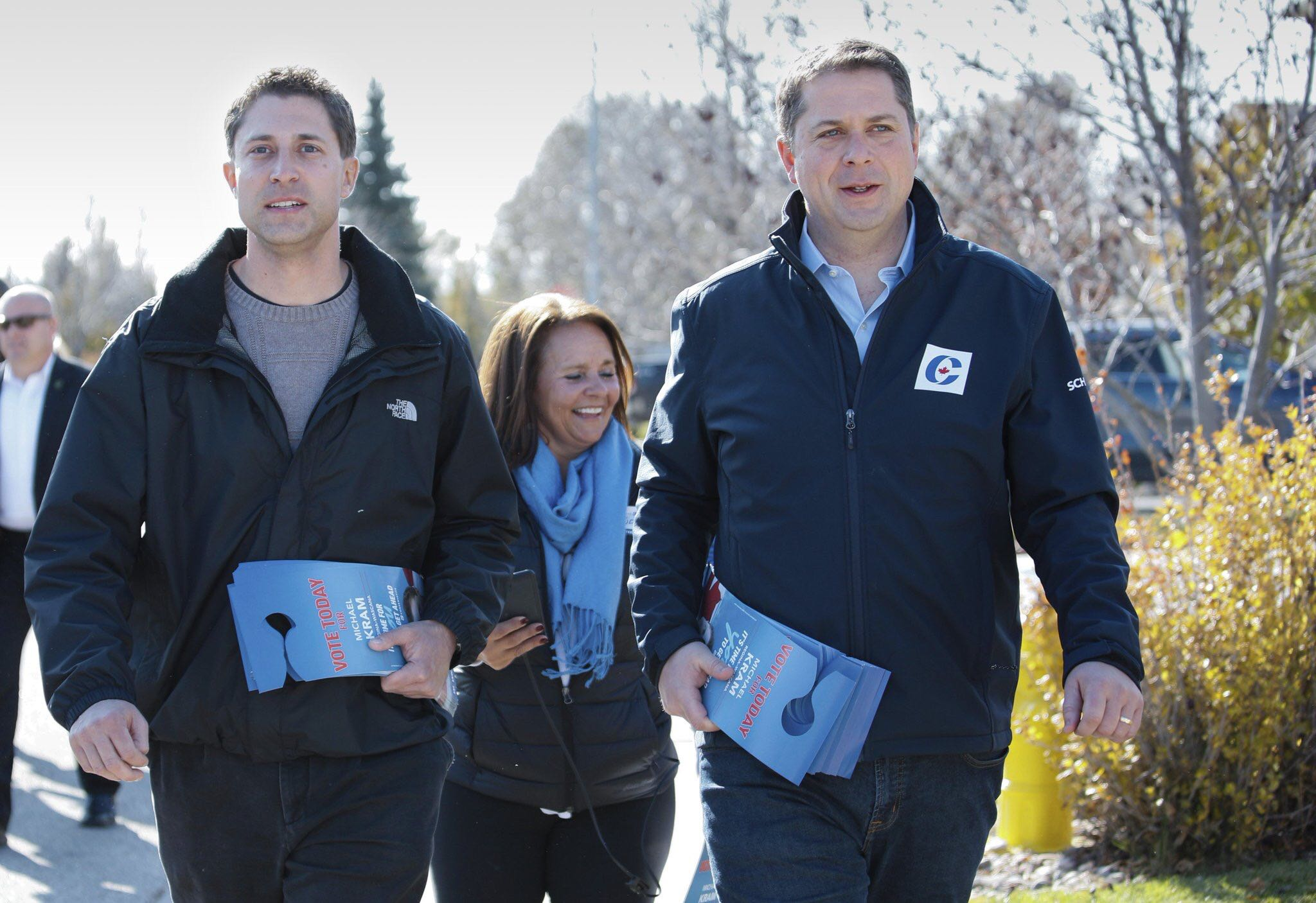
Kram (left) campaigning in Regina with Conservative Party leader Andrew Scheer (right) in the run-up to the 2019 election.

Kram ran again as the Conservative candidate for Regina—Wascana in the 2019 federal election. He defeated the incumbent Goodale by a margin of over 7,000 votes, capturing 49.3 per cent of the popular vote.

Due to Goodale's long incumbency, Kram was widely predicted to lose throughout the campaign. On September 18, 2019, University of Regina political studies professor Jim Farney said, "I would guess that the race is going to be closer than it was last time, but that kind of name recognition — the 30 years of networking in public service — is probably going to see another Goodale victory," he said.

On October 17, 2019, The Western Producer predicted that Goodale would hold onto his seat, as did The National.

The Election Prediction Project maintained Goodale as their prediction throughout the campaign.

On October 3, 2019, a Hill & Knowlton/Advanced Symbolics Inc. artificial intelligence poll predicted a Goodale win, albeit by a reduced margin.

=== Member of Parliament ===
Kram was sworn in as a Member of Parliament on November 12, 2019. Party leader Andrew Scheer, who represents neighbouring Regina—Qu'Appelle in the House, subsequently appointed him to the Canadian House of Commons Standing Committee on International Trade and named Deputy Critic for International Trade for the Conservative Opposition caucus.

In September 2020, Erin O'Toole, who had succeeded Scheer as leader of the Conservative Party the previous month, reassigned Kram to the House of Commons Standing Committee on Transport, Infrastructure and Communities. Since his appointment to this committee, Kram has become vocal regarding pandemic assistance for airports, especially his local airport in Regina, Saskatchewan.

In December, 2021, O'Toole named Kram Vice-Chair of the Industry and Technology Committee During this time, Kram advocated on behalf of the Canadian Institute of Public Safety Research and Treatment and other research projects at the University of Regina.

Following the Conservative leadership race of 2022, newly elected Conservative leader Pierre Poilievre reassigned Kram to the Public Accounts committee. Early in his tenure on this committee, Kram uncovered that several federal government departments had been defrauded by their own employees who had claimed the Canadian Emergency Response Benefit while still working full time.

Kram was subsequently reassigned to the Environment Committee. On that committee, he received media attention for exposing that the government's 2 Billion Trees Program did not actually intend to plant that many trees and was unsure of how many trees they had actually planted.

Following the 2025 federal election, Kram was assigned to the Joint Standing Committee on the Scrutiny of Regulations and as an associate member of the Standing Committee on Procedure and House Affairs.

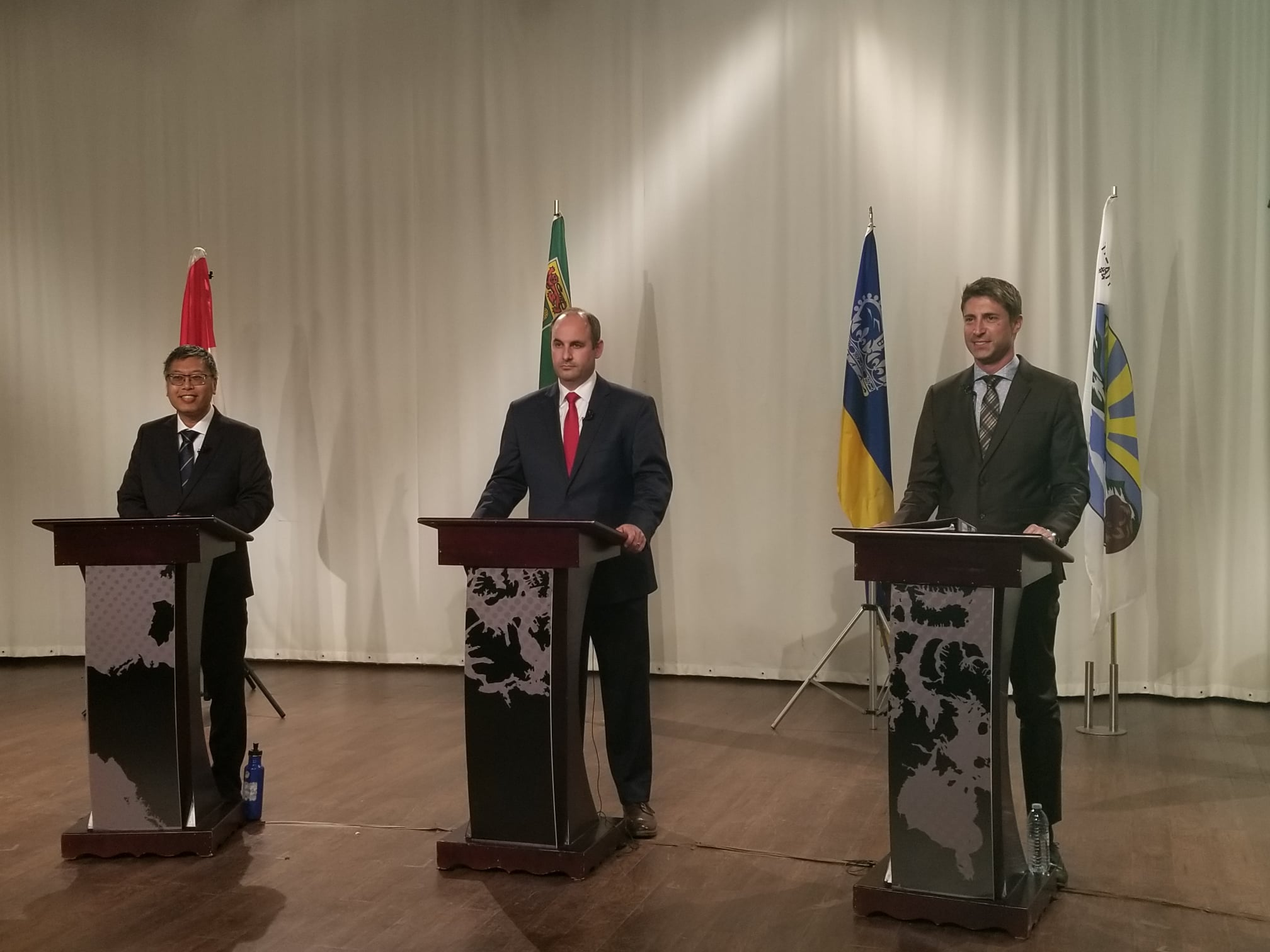
l-r, Green Party candidate Victor Lau, Liberal candidate Sean McEachern and CPC candidate Michael Kram at Access-7 Regina-Wascana debate

=== 2021 federal election ===
Kram ran for re-election as the Conservative candidate for Regina-Wascana in the 2021 federal election. His primary challenger was Liberal Sean McEachern, former chief of staff and campaign manager to former MP Ralph Goodale. McEachern highlighted his connection to Goodale frequently in the media in an effort to capture nostalgia for the former MP.

As in 2019 election campaign, Kram's re-election was regarded skeptically by local media who identified Regina-Wascana as a "riding to watch" for a potential loss by the Conservatives. The polling aggregator site 338Canada.com projected the constituency as a "toss up" through much of the campaign.

In the final result, Kram won by nearly double the Liberal vote and increased his share of the popular vote in spite of the right-wing competitor People's Party more than tripling its support.

=== 2025 federal election ===
Kram ran for re-election as the Conservative candidate for Regina-Wascana in the 2025 federal election. His primary challenger was Jeffrey Walters, a sessional lecturer at the University of Regina.

The nationwide collapse of the NDP vote was reflected in the outcome of the Regina-Wascana with the local NDP vote dropping 13.22 per cent, roughly equivalent to the increase in local Liberal support. Nonetheless, Kram's absolute vote increased by 2,811 votes and his vote share increasing by 0.18 per cent to 50.08.

In June, 2025, Kram was named as a full member of the Standing Joint Committee for the Scrutiny of Regulations and as an associate member of the Standing Committee on Procedures and House Affairs.

== Electoral record ==
=== Regina—Wascana ===
2025 Canadian federal election: Regina—Wascana
** Preliminary results — Not yet official **
Party	Candidate	Votes	%	±%	Expenditures
Conservative	Michael Kram	22,072	50.08	+0.18	
Liberal	Jeffrey Walters	19,252	43.68	+16.76	
New Democratic	Kaitlyn Stadnyk	2,138	4.85	–13.22	
People's	Peter Bruce	326	0.74	–2.76	
Green	Kimberly Epp	289	0.66	–0.95	
Total valid votes/expense limit		44,077	69.59		
Total rejected ballots		294	0.66		
Turnout		44,371	70.06		
Eligible voters		63,339			
Conservative hold		Swing		–8.15	
Source: Elections Canada

2021 Canadian federal election: Regina—Wascana
Party	Candidate	Votes	%	±%	Expenditures
Conservative	Michael Kram	19,261	49.9	+0.47	$80,923.17
Liberal	Sean McEachern	10,390	26.9	-6.71	$86,519.29
New Democratic	Erin Hidlebaugh	6,975	18.1	+5.39	$3,062.34
People's	Mario Milanovski	1,352	3.5	+2.51	$2,039.18
Green	Victor Lau	622	1.6	-1.3	$2,714.95
Total valid votes/expense limit		38,600	99.3	–	$102,892.46
Total rejected ballots		291	0.07		
Turnout		38,891	63.9		
Eligible voters		60,858			
Source: Elections Canada

2019 Canadian federal election: Regina—Wascana
Party	Candidate	Votes	%	±%	Expenditures
Conservative	Michael Kram	22,418	49.43	+19.16	$74,982.33
Liberal	Ralph Goodale	15,242	33.61	-21.52	$92,046.46
New Democratic	Hailey Clark	5,801	12.79	+0.24	none listed
Green	Tamela Friesen	1,316	2.90	+0.85	$2,193.36
People's	Mario Milanovski	450	0.99	-	$4,344.47
Independent	Evangeline Godron	128	0.28	-	none listed
Total valid votes/expense limit		45,355	99.25		
Total rejected ballots		344	0.75	+0.34	
Turnout		45,699	75.60	+0.99	
Eligible voters		60,451			
Conservative gain from Liberal		Swing		+20.34	
Source: Elections Canada

2015 Canadian federal election: Regina—Wascana
Party	Candidate	Votes	%	±%	Expenditures
Liberal	Ralph Goodale	23,552	55.13	+13.37	$96,786.47
Conservative	Michael Kram	12,931	30.27	-5.44	$89,000.81
New Democratic	April Bourgeois	5,362	12.55	-7.53	$21,735.49
Green	Frances Simonson	878	2.06	-0.4	$4,601.01
Total valid votes/expense limit		42,723	99.59		$193,043.93
Total rejected ballots		176	0.41	–	
Turnout		42,889	74.60	–	
Eligible voters		57,504			
Liberal hold		Swing		+9.41	
Source: Elections Canada
