= John Cowburn =

Australian politician

John William Cowburn (1868 – 31 July 1947) was an English-born Australian politician.

He was born in Burlington to engine cleaner Charles Cowburn and his wife Elizabeth. He worked as a fitter, and married Martha Shaw, with whom he had two children. He migrated to Australia in 1912, becoming active in the Amalgamated Society of Engineers (later the Amalgamated Engineering Union). From 1931 to 1934 he was a Labor member of the New South Wales Legislative Council. He died at Canterbury in 1947.
