= Garnet Menzies =

Canadian politician (c.1886–1966)

Garnet Nelson Menzies (ca 1886 – February 18, 1966) was a politician in Saskatchewan, Canada. He served as mayor of Regina from 1949 to 1951.

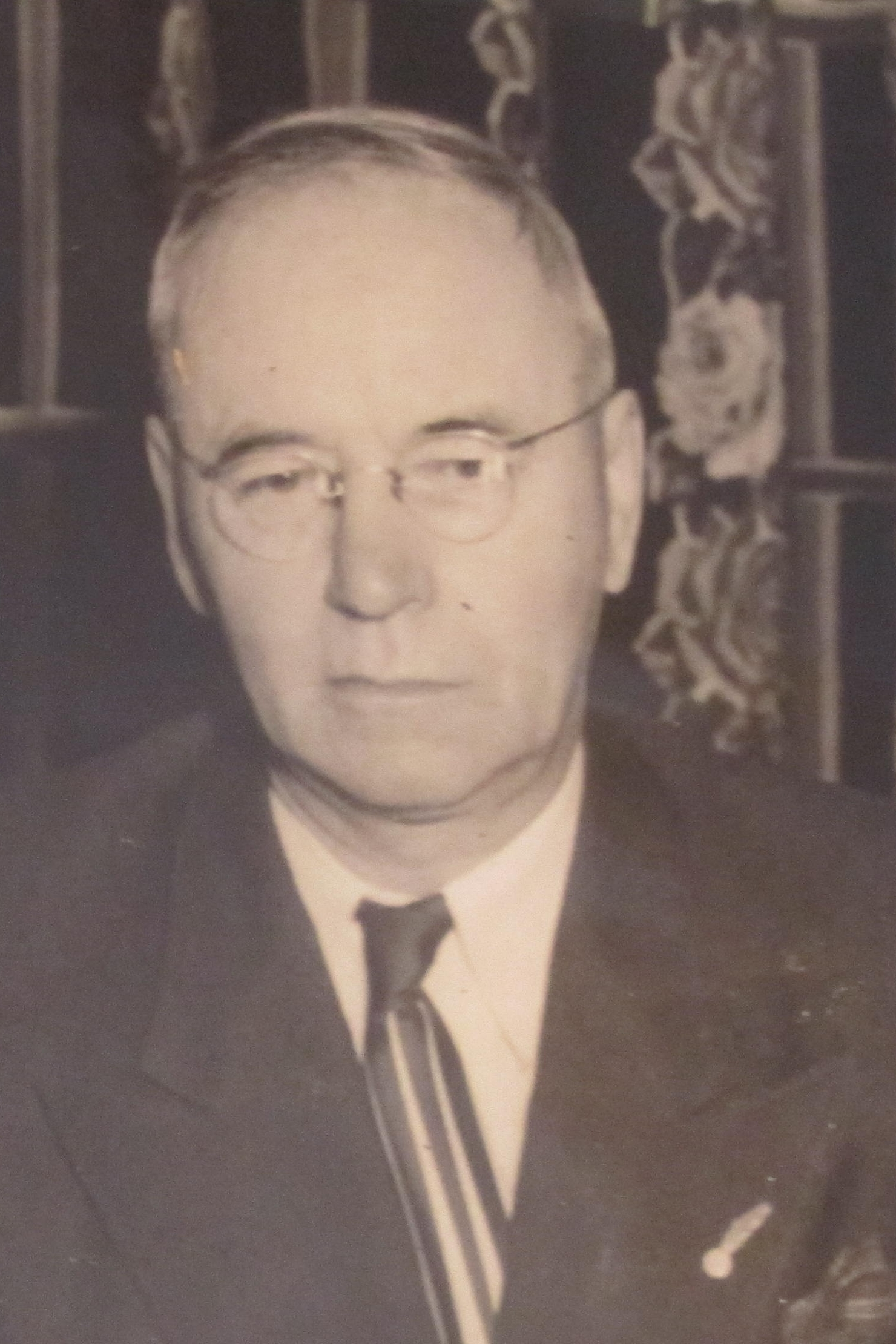
Garnet Menzies

The son of CPR Engineer Peter Whyte Menzies (1854-1926), he was born in Farnham Quebec and came to Regina in 1914, working as a printer for the Regina Leader-Post. He went on to work for Commercial Printers for approximately 30 years. He also served as president for the Regina Typographical Union. In 1916, he married Jean McClelland, who had been a deaconess of the Presbyterian Church in Canada up until then, but she was "disjoined" because only single women could be members of the deaconess order.

Menzies served on Regina city council for most of the years between 1931 and 1948. In 1943, he ran unsuccessfully for the position of mayor, losing to Charles Cromwell Williams. When subsequently elected Mayor (1949-1951) he welcomed Princess Elizabeth and Prince Philip to City Hall during their 1951 Tour of Canada. Garnet had four brothers and one sister; his younger brother Albert Percival ("Percy") Menzies (1888-1948) was for a time a Presbyterian minister in Regina and notably distinguished himself at the Battle of Vimy Ridge.

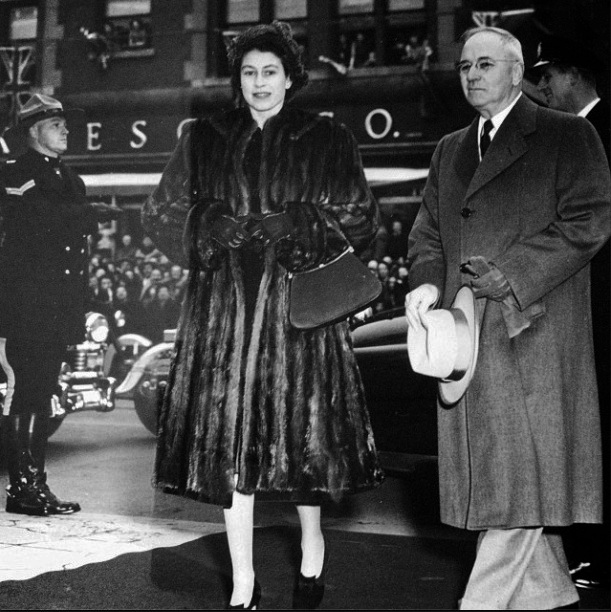
Princess Elizabeth with Mayor Garnet Menzies, Regina, Saskatchewan, 1951

Menzies ran unsuccessfully for the Regina City seat in the provincial assembly in 1934 and again in 1952. He died on February 18, 1966, in Saskatoon while visiting his daughter there.

Menzies Place in Regina was named in his honour.
