= J. A. McCaul =

Canadian businessman and politician

J. A. McCaul was a Canadian businessman and politician. He operated a lumber and coal business in Regina, Saskatchewan and become mayor in 1890. He was the first president of the Regina Chamber of Commerce.
