= John McAra House =

- U.S. National Register of Historic Places
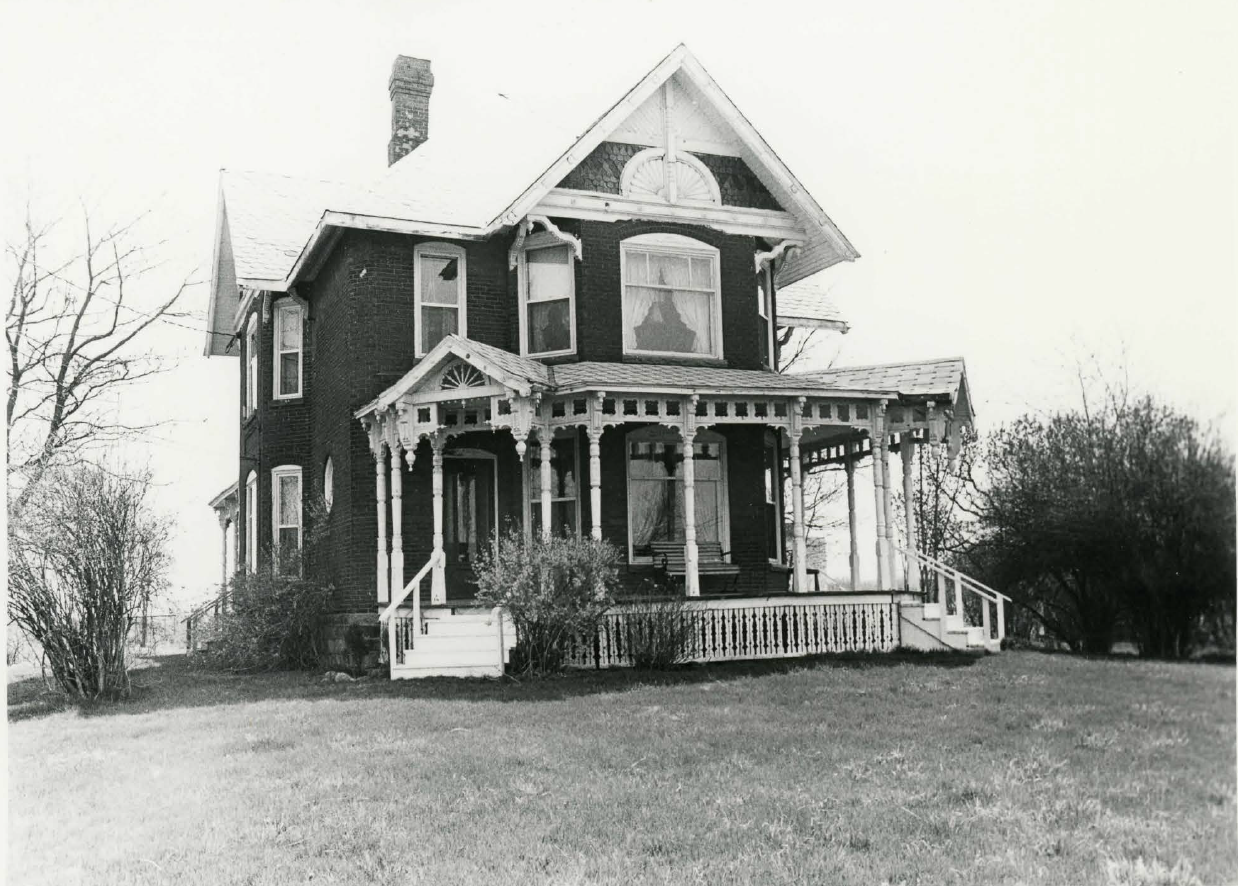
- Interactive map
- Location: 2157 Irish Rd., Davison, Michigan
- Coordinates: 43°00′03″N 83°33′17″W
- Area: less than one acre
- Built: 1892
- Architectural style: Queen Anne
- MPS: Genesee County MRA
- NRHP reference No.: 82000522
- Added to NRHP: November 26, 1982

The John McAra House is a single-family home located at 2157 Irish Road in Davison, Michigan. It was listed on the National Register of Historic Places in 1982.

John McAra built this house in 1892. It is a two-story brick Queen Anne structure with a slate roof and a large, open wrap-around porch in the front. The porch has a lattice-like tower section, turned columns, and decorative bargeboards. The panels in the gable ends are ornately carved. The house is one of the most sophisticated examples of rural Queen Anne styling in the surrounding area.
