= Thomas Cowburn =

Canadian politician (1888–1976)

Mayor of Regina
- In office 1957–1958
- Preceded by: Les Hammond
- Succeeded by: Henry Harold Peter Baker

Personal details
- Born: December 18, 1888 Blackburn, Lancashire, England
- Died: August 14, 1976 (aged 87) Regina, Saskatchewan
- Occupation: teacher

Thomas Herbert Cowburn (December 18, 1888 – August 14, 1976) was an educator and politician in Saskatchewan, Canada. He served as mayor of Regina, Saskatchewan from 1957 to 1958.

He taught at Regina Central Collegiate from 1927 to 1930 and at Balfour Technical School from 1930 to 1947. He served as principal of Balfour from 1947 until his retirement from teaching in 1954. He died at Regina in 1978.

Cowburn Crescent in Regina was named in his honour.
