= Thomas McNall =

Thomas George McNall (1874–1953) was a merchant and political figure in Saskatchewan, Canada. He was mayor of Regina from 1945 to 1946.

He was born in Creemore, Ontario and taught school for several years in Ontario. In 1898, he married Henrietta McLeod. Around 1900, he moved to Toronto, where he was employed with George Weston's company. In 1907, he went to Regina as head of a new branch opening there. He bought out the branch in 1914 and opened his own wholesale business. In 1950, he sold the business to the Hudson's Bay Company but continued on as corporate director. McNall served on Regina city council from 1926 to 1944.
