= Richard Henry Williams =

Canadian lumber merchant and political figure

Richard Henry Williams (June 13, 1852 — August 25, 1924) was a Canadian lumber merchant and political figure in the province of Saskatchewan. He was mayor of Regina, the province's capital and second-largest city, from 1891 to 1892 and from 1909 to 1910.

He was born in Toronto. After completing his education, Williams worked on the family farm in Simcoe County before finding work in a lumber mill. In 1874, he married Mary Susan Reid. In 1881, he headed west to Fort Garry and continued on to Regina in 1882, where his wife and family joined him. Williams entered the construction business there before opening a lumber supply company in 1891. In 1888, he established the Glasgow House, the main department store in Regina for almost 60 years. He served on the board of the Regina General Hospital, serving as chairman from 1915 to 1921, and was also a member of the school board.

Williams died in Regina at the age of 72 from complications stomach cancer.
