= Larry Schneider (politician) =

Canadian politician (1938–2026)

The Honourable Larry Schneider PC

Member of the Canadian Parliament for Regina—Wascana
- In office November 21, 1988 – October 25, 1993
- Preceded by: New riding
- Succeeded by: Ralph Goodale

Personal details
- Born: March 23, 1938 Regina, Saskatchewan, Canada
- Died: November 19, 2026 (aged 88)
- Party: Progressive Conservative
- Cabinet: Minister of Western Economic Diversification (1993)
- Committees: Chair, Standing Committee on Aboriginal Affairs (1991–1993)

Lawrence "Larry" Schneider, PC (March 23, 1938 – November 19, 2026) was a Canadian politician.

== Biography ==
Born in Regina, Saskatchewan, he was mayor of Regina from 1979 until 1988. In the 1988 federal election, he was elected as a Progressive Conservative candidate in the riding of Regina—Wascana. Under Kim Campbell's government, from June 25, 1993 until November 3, 1993, he was Minister of Western Economic Diversification. He lost his seat in the 1993 election to Ralph Goodale.

He was president of the Prairie Implement Manufacturers' Association.

Schneider supported Conservative Party candidate Michael Kram in the riding of Regina-Wascana in the 2015 federal election.

He died on November 19, 2026, at the age of 88.

== Electoral record ==
=== Regina—Wascana ===
1993 Canadian federal election: Regina—Wascana
Party	Candidate	Votes	%	±%
Liberal	Ralph Goodale	19,555	44.3	+11.5
New Democratic	Donna Shire	9,323	21.1	-11.8
Progressive Conservative	Larry Schneider	6,943	15.7	-18.3
Reform	Andrew Jackson	6,935	15.7	–
National	John Keen	734	1.7	–
Natural Law	C. Angus Hunt	228	0.5	–
Christian Heritage	Hugh Owens	192	0.4	–
Independent	Barry James Farr	185	0.4	–
Canada Party	Walter P. Sigda	64	0.1	–
Total valid votes		44,159	100.0	

1988 Canadian federal election: Regina—Wascana
Party	Candidate	Votes	%
Progressive Conservative	Larry Schneider	15,339	34.0
New Democratic	Dickson Bailey	14,829	32.9
Liberal	Ralph Goodale	14,804	32.8
Communist	Kimball Cariou	76	0.2
Libertarian	Ian Christopher Madsen	65	0.1
Total valid votes		45,113	100.0
