= Peter McAra Jr. =

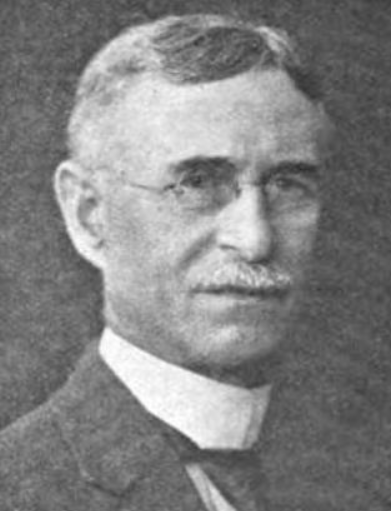

Mayor of Regina, Saskatchewan
- In office 1906, 1911–1912

Personal details
- Born: November 7, 1862 Fort William, India
- Died: February 12, 1950 (aged 87) Regina, Saskatchewan
- Spouse: Amanda Jane Wallace (m. 1883)
- Children: 4
- Occupation: Businessman, politician

Peter McAra Jr. (November 7, 1862 – February 12, 1950) was a businessman and political figure in Saskatchewan, Canada. He was mayor of Regina in 1906 and from 1911 to 1912.

== Biography ==
He was born in Fort William, Kolkata, India on November 7, 1862, the son of Peter McAra and Barbara Fisken, both natives of Scotland, and was educated in Edinburgh. In 1883, he came to Long Lake, Saskatchewan, where he worked for the Dominion Express Company and the Canadian Pacific Railway.

In 1883, he married Amanda Jane Wallace, and they had four children. McAra opened a fire insurance office in Regina in 1896. In 1910, his brother James and W. L. Wallace became partners in the business. He led recovery work and restoration following the Regina Cyclone of 1912. McAra was also president of the British Western Trust Corporation, head of Capital Ice Company and Income Tax Commissioner of Saskatchewan. He served as president of the Regina Board of Trade and of the Associated Boards of Trade of Saskatchewan and Alberta and served twelve years as chairman of the board for the Regina Collegiate Institute. McAra helped establish the Regina Anti-Tuberculosis League (later the Saskatchewan Lung Association) and the Union of Saskatchewan Municipalities and served as its first president for both organizations.

In 1945, he published his memoirs: Sixty-two years on the Saskatchewan prairies.

He died in Regina on February 12, 1950.
