= James McAra =

Scottish-born businessman and political figure in Saskatchewan, Canada

James McAra (October 17, 1876 – September 7, 1947) was a Scottish-born businessman and political figure in Saskatchewan, Canada. He served as mayor of Regina from 1927 to 1930 and from 1932 to 1933.

He was born in Edinburgh, the son of Peter McAra, and came to Regina in 1883 with his parents. He first found work delivering newspapers and later worked in the offices of the government of the Northwest Territories. McAra then entered the real estate and insurance business established by his brother, Peter McAra, Jr. In 1900, he married M.G. Beattie. He served as a colonel during World War I, leading a company that served overseas. After the war, he commanded the Military Hospital Commission of Saskatchewan and was responsible for the demobilization of all troops from Saskatchewan. McAra was chosen as president of the provincial Great War Veterans Association. He died in 1947.
