= 2006 Saskatchewan municipal elections =

Elections in Canada

Municipal elections in Saskatchewan were held on various dates throughout 2006. Voters in the Canadian province of Saskatchewan elected the mayors and councillors in all resort villages on July 22; the mayors and councillors in all northern municipalities on various dates throughout the fall; and the mayors and councillors in all cities, towns, villages and the reeves and odd-numbered division councillors in all rural municipalities on October 25.

Listed below are selected municipal mayoral and city councillor races across the province. An "(X)" is listed next to the incumbent's name, where it applies.

== Resort villages ==
Elections in Saskatchewan’s resort villages were held on July 22.

== Northern municipalities ==
Elections in Saskatchewan’s northern municipalities were held on various dates throughout the fall, as provincial legislation allows these municipalities to each schedule their elections on a variety of date options.

== Cities, towns, and villages ==
Elections in Saskatchewan’s cities, towns, and villages were held on October 25, 2006.

=== Estevan ===
Candidate	Vote	%
Herb Padwick	Acclaimed	

=== Humboldt ===
Candidate	Vote	%
Malcolm Eaton	Acclaimed	

=== Lloydminster ===
(including portions in Alberta)

Candidate	Vote	%
Ken Baker (X)	Acclaimed	

=== Melfort ===
Candidate	Vote	%
Kevin Phillips	827	46.3
Darrell Collins (X)	570	31.9
Paul Thorndyke	390	21.8

=== Moose Jaw ===
Candidate	Vote	%
Dale McBain (X)	6,394	59.8
Stu Gaye	2,414	22.6
Jim Carr	1,887	17.6

=== North Battleford ===
Candidate	Vote	%
Julian Sadlowski (X)	1,964	61.7
Donna Challis	1,219	38.3

=== Prince Albert ===
Candidate	Vote	%
Jim Scarrow	6,064	56.7
Gordon Kirkby	2,561	24.0
Jim Stiglitz (X)	1,748	16.3
Brian R. Clavier	319	3.0

=== Regina ===
==== Mayor ====
Candidate	Vote	%
Pat Fiacco (X)	42,946	84.1
Jim Holmes	7,401	14.5
Wayne Wagner	364	0.7
Darcy Robillard	353	0.7

==== Council ====
Elected councillors

Ward	Elected
1	Louis Browne
2	Jocelyn Hutchinson
3	Fred Clipsham (X)
4	Michael Fougere (X)
5	Bill Gray (X)
6	Wade Murray (X)
7	Sharron Bryce (X)
8	Michael O'Donnell
9	Tery Hincks (X)
10	Jerry Flegel (X)

=== Saskatoon ===
==== Mayor ====
Candidate	Vote	%
Don Atchison (X)	38,378	63.9
Lenore Swystun	13,539	22.5
Jim Maddin	5,610	9.3
Ron B. Kocsis	1,193	2.0
Johnny Melenchuk	552	0.9
Mark Ewart	402	0.7
Mark Dean Weinmeyer	391	0.7

==== Council ====
Elected councillors

Ward	Elected
1	Darren Hill (X)
2	Pat Lorje (X)
3	Moe Neault (X)
4	Myles Heidt (X)
5	Gordon Wyant (X)
6	Charlie Clark
7	Bob Pringle (X)
8	Glen Penner (X)
9	Tiffany Paulsen (X)
10	Bev Dubois (X)

=== Swift Current ===
Candidate	Vote	%
Sandy Larson (X)	3,480	59.1
Don Robinson	2,070	35.2
Henry Banman	336	5.7

=== Weyburn ===
Candidate	Vote	%
Debra Button	1,877	50.4
Ray Hamm	1,782	48.1
Bruce Croft	43	1.2

=== Yorkton ===
Candidate	Vote	%
Chris Wyatt	3,299	57.9
Phil DeVos (X)	1,663	29.2
Richard Yaholnitsky	737	12.9

== Rural municipalities ==
Elections in Saskatchewan’s rural municipalities were held on October 25 to elect reeves and odd-numbered division councillors.

=== Corman Park No. 344 ===
Candidate	Vote	%
Ed Hobday (X)	Acclaimed	

== See also ==
- List of municipal elections in Saskatchewan
