= 2012 Saskatchewan municipal elections =

- Various dates

Municipal elections in Saskatchewan were held on various dates throughout 2012. Voters in the Canadian province of Saskatchewan elected the mayors and councillors in all resort villages on July 28; the mayors and councillors in all northern municipalities on various dates throughout the fall; and the mayors and councillors in all cities, towns, villages and the reeves and odd-numbered division councillors in all rural municipalities on October 24.

Listed below are selected municipal mayoral and city councillor races across the province. An "(X)" is listed next to the incumbent's name, where it applies.

== Resort villages ==
Elections in Saskatchewan’s resort villages were held on July 28.

== Northern municipalities ==
Elections in Saskatchewan’s northern municipalities were held on various dates throughout the fall, as provincial legislation allows these municipalities to each schedule their elections on a variety of date options.

== Cities, towns, and villages ==
Elections in Saskatchewan’s cities, towns, and villages were held on October 24, 2012.

=== Estevan ===
Candidate	Vote	%
Roy Ludwig	1,807	59.9
Lynn Chipley	912	30.2
Jim Halladay	299	9.9

=== Humboldt ===
Candidate	Vote	%
Malcolm Eaton (X)	Acclaimed	

=== Lloydminster ===
Candidate	Vote	%
Jeff Mulligan (X)	Acclaimed	

=== Martensville ===
Candidate	Vote	%
Kent Muench	741	73.5
Darnell Kuzek	225	22.3
Scott Pilling	42	4.2

=== Meadow Lake ===
Candidate	Vote	%
Gary Vidal (X)	Acclaimed	

=== Melfort ===
Candidate	Vote	%
Rick Lang	911	55.2
Doug Terry (X)	740	44.8

=== Moose Jaw ===
Candidate	Vote	%
Deb Higgins	5,239	53.0
Fraser Tolmie	4,645	47.0

=== North Battleford ===
Candidate	Vote	%
Ian Hamilton (X)	Acclaimed	

=== Prince Albert ===
Candidate	Vote	%
Greg Dionne	4,210	51.55
Jim Scarrow (X)	3,125	38.26
Dean Link	832	10.19

=== Regina ===
The results in Regina were as follows:

==== Mayor ====
Candidate	Vote	%
Michael Fougere	21,685	42.4
Marian Donnelly	16,240	31.8
Meka Okochi	8,960	17.5
Liz Brass	2,616	5.1
Jim Elliott	481	0.9
Chad Novak	413	0.8
Charles Wiebe	341	0.7
Tim Siekawitch	195	0.4
Tom Brown	172	0.3

==== Council ====
Candidate	Vote	%
Ward 1
Barbara Young	2,222	36.2
Shawn Kuster	1,970	32.1
John Klein	721	11.7
Conrad Hewitt	544	8.9
Terry Madole	369	6.0
Rob Armstrong	194	2.0
Keith Rey	125	2.0
Ward 2
Bob Hawkins	1,764	28.0
Heather McIntyre	1,672	26.5
Richard Dittrick	1,659	26.3
Sam Khan	1,210	19.2
Ward 3
Shawn Fraser	2,203	42.0
Susan Birley	1,049	19.6
Don Young	662	12.6
Shirley Dixon	649	12.4
Eric Anderson	600	11.4
Janice Muir	96	1.8
D. Justin Slobodan	60	1.1
Ward 4
Bryon Burnett	2,575	38.7
Tina Beaudry-Mellor	2,541	38.2
Perry Leitner	1,167	17.5
Darryl Smith	367	5.5
Ward 5
John Findura (X)	2,306	48.1
Bill Gray	1,465	30.6
Femi Ogunrinde	1,023	21.3
Ward 6
Wade Murray (X)	1,055	49.1
Sarah Etter	615	28.6
Allan Kirk	248	11.5
Stephen McDavid	230	10.7
Ward 7
Sharron Bryce (X)	2,389	59.8
Danny Berehula	920	23.0
Colin Stewart	483	12.1
Austin Stadnyk	201	5.0
Ward 8
Mike O'Donnell (X)	2,762	63.0
Brian Runge	1,625	37.0
Ward 9
Terry Hincks (X)	2,090	39.3
Harold Knight	1,810	34.4
Kevin Mooney	928	17.7
Dawn Thomas	429	8.2
Ward 10
Jerry Flegel	2,658	51.9
Chris Szarka (X)	2,460	48.1

=== Saskatoon ===
Results.

==== Mayor ====
Candidate	Vote	%
Don Atchison (X)	34,489	52.11
Tom Wolf	31,085	46.97
Clay Mazurkewich	605	0.91

==== Council ====
Candidate	Vote	%
Ward 1
Darren Hill (X)	3936	62.0
Robin Bellamy	2413	38.0
Ward 2
Pat Lorje	2686	61.1
Owen Fortosky	1518	34.5
Robert Godfrey	193	4.4
Ward 3
Ann Iwanchuk (X)	2320	50.3
Mike San Miguel	2292	49.7
Ward 4
Troy Davies	3000	51.7
Sean Shaw	2799	48.3
Ward 5
Randy Donauer (X)	5156	73.2
James Ford	1885	26.8
Ward 6
Charlie Clark (X)	5370	66.3
Brandon Snowsell	1460	18.0
Chad Leier-Berg	1051	13.0
Howard Fullford	218	2.7
Ward 7
Marin Loewen (X)	5120	53.4
Mike Bzowey	3602	37.5
Tony Obridgewitch	643	6.7
Margaret Peters	230	2.4
Ward 8
Eric Olauson	2250	35.5
Ainsley Robertson	1989	31.4
Sharon Wingate	1069	16.9
Karen Rooney	1028	16.2
Ward 9
Tiffany Paulsen (X)	4698	71.2
Dennis Nowoselsky	1897	28.8
Ward 10
Zach Jeffries	3022	46.4
Bev Dubois (X)	2845	43.6
Mark Horseman	653	10.0

=== Swift Current ===
Candidate	Vote	%
Jerrod Schafer (X)	Acclaimed	

=== Warman ===
Candidate	Vote	%
Sheryl Spence (X)	Acclaimed	

=== Weyburn ===
Candidate	Vote	%
Debra Button (X)	1,683	86.5
Bruce Croft	262	13.5

=== Yorkton ===
Candidate	Vote	%
Bob Maloney	3,590	94.5
Richard Genaille	208	5.5

== Rural municipalities ==
Elections in Saskatchewan’s rural municipalities were held on October 24 to elect reeves and odd-numbered division councillors.

== See also ==
- List of municipal elections in Saskatchewan
