= Henry Dayday =

Mayor of Saskatoon

His Worship Henry Dayday
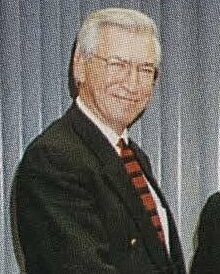

Mayor of Saskatoon
- In office 1988–2000
- Preceded by: Clifford Wright
- Succeeded by: Jim Maddin

Saskatoon City Alderman for Ward 7
- In office 1976-1988
- Constituency: Ward 7

Personal details
- Born: October 8, 1939 (age 87) Bankend, Saskatchewan, Canada
- Education: University of Saskatchewan
- Occupation: Educator and Consultant

Henry Dayday (born October 8, 1939) is a Canadian politician who served as the mayor of Saskatoon, Saskatchewan from 1988 to 2000. He was elected mayor four times, tied for the most since mayoral terms were extended beyond one year in 1954, although he is tied as the second longest-serving mayor in the city's history as the term limit for mayor was extended from three to four years in 2012. However, Dayday did serve the longest overall stint on City Council at 24 consecutive years.

== Early life and education ==
Dayday was raised on a farm near the town of Bankend, Saskatchewan. He moved to Saskatoon and earned two bachelor's degrees from the University of Saskatchewan, including a bachelor's of education. He taught high school math in rural Saskatchewan before returning to Saskatoon in 1969, where he continued to teach, working at Evan Hardy, City Park, and Marion M. Graham Collegiates. Dayday continued teaching at Marion Graham even after he was elected mayor.

== Political career ==
=== Saskatoon City Council ===
Dayday first ran for City Council in 1973, but was unsuccessful in his bid. He ran again and was elected as alderman for Ward 7 in 1976, beginning a run of 24 consecutive years on council. This tied him with Morris Cherneskey for the longest consecutive stint on council, and the longest for someone who took over the mayor's chair. Dayday was re-elected in 1979 and made history as the first alderman to be acclaimed when he ran unopposed in the 1982 election. He was re-elected to a fourth council term in 1985.

=== Mayor's office ===
Dayday ran for Mayor in 1988 after four-term incumbent Clifford Wright opted to step down; at the time Wright left the office, he was the longest-serving mayor in Saskatoon's history. Dayday was successful in his run and was re-elected three more times during the 1990s, matching Wright's run of 12 years in the mayor's chair. Dayday's priority during this period was on keeping property tax increases low, emphasizing what he saw as fiscally responsible governance.

Dayday ran for a fifth term in 2000, but he was unseated by former Ward 1 councillor Jim Maddin. At the time, Dayday was just the second incumbent mayor to lose a re-election attempt. By the late 1990s, the Saskatoon Police Service was embroiled in controversy over the practice of Starlight tours, or the abandoning of Indigenous residents outside of the city in freezing temperatures. Maddin, a retired police officer and superintendent, made reforming the police a top priority as he tried to capitalize on a perceived lack of leadership from Dayday. It was also speculated that Dayday was hurt by his decision to run as a Liberal candidate in a 1999 federal by-election; many said at the time that he should have resigned as mayor in order to run. Dayday ultimately finished third in the race.

=== Unsuccessful bids ===
After the New Democratic Member of Parliament for Saskatoon-Rosetown-Biggar, Chris Axworthy, resigned in the summer of 1999, Dayday ran in the by-election as the Liberal candidate. In a race dominated by rural and agricultural issues, Dayday argued that a Liberal MP would be best-positioned to secure federal aid for Saskatchewan farms given that the Liberals at the time enjoyed a majority government. However, Dayday finished a distant third. In 2003, Dayday unsuccessfully sought the Conservative nomination for the 2004 federal election in the riding of Saskatoon-Humboldt.

In 2012 Dayday announced his intention to run again for Saskatoon mayor, challenging three-term incumbent Don Atchison. However, he withdrew from the race during the nomination period, citing the need to avoid splitting the vote with another challenger, Tom Wolf. Wolf would go on to lose narrowly to Atchison, who secured a fourth term, equaling the mayoral runs of Dayday and Wright. However, the extension of term limits from three to four years meant that Dayday and Wright were unseated as the longest-serving mayors by Atchison, who ultimately sat in the mayor's chair for 13 years.

Dayday again announced his intention to run for Saskatoon mayor in 2016. Once again he intended to challenge Atchison, who was seeking a fifth term. Dayday was focused on issues of fiscal management, labelling Atchison's council as "irresponsible spenders," railing against rising debt levels, and opposing new communications allowances for City Council members. However, despite stating his attention to see the race through, unlike in 2012, Dayday once again withdrew before the nomination deadline when polls showed him running at 5%, well behind three others. Former councillor Charlie Clark ultimately won the 2016 race, which kept Atchison's tenure to four terms.

== Personal life ==
After his long stint as mayor, Dayday worked as a business consultant and was a member of the Board of Directors for the Saskatoon Airport Authority. In 2005, Dayday received the Saskatchewan Centennial Medal.

Dayday and his wife Margaret have three children. He was a long-time hockey player and coach, and also coached local teams in football, track and field, and basketball. He was long an active member of local recreation boards.

== Honours ==
Several streets in the Aspen Ridge neighbourhood of Saskatoon, most notably Henry Dayday Road, are named in his honour. As of 2022 he is the most recent Saskatoon mayor to have streets named after him.

== See also ==
- List of mayors of Saskatoon
