= Jim Maddin =

Canadian politician

Mayor of Asquith, Saskatchewan
- In office 2009–2015

Mayor of Saskatoon
- In office 2000–2003
- Preceded by: Henry Dayday
- Succeeded by: Don Atchison

Saskatoon City Councillor for Ward 1
- In office 1997–2000
- Preceded by: Herve Langlois
- Succeeded by: Lenore Swystun

Personal details
- Born: 1947 or 1948 (age 77–78) Kerrobert, Saskatchewan, Canada
- Occupation: Private investigator

Jim Maddin is a Canadian politician who was Mayor of Saskatoon from 2000 to 2003, and mayor of the town of Asquith in west central Saskatchewan from 2009 to 2015.

== Early life and career ==
Maddin was born in Kerrobert, Saskatchewan, and moved between Saskatchewan, British Columbia, and Alberta as he grew up. He graduated from high school in Kerrobert in 1966. When he was 14 he received a brochure about joining the RCMP, and he ultimately pursued a career in policing. He joined the Saskatoon Police Service in 1972 and remained for 25 years, reaching the rank of superintendent in charge of the human resources division. He accepted early retirement in 1997, following budget cutbacks that he argued were political in nature.

In 1988, he received a Business Administration certificate from the University of Saskatchewan. In 2006, Maddin received certification as a private investigator.

== Political career ==
=== Saskatoon City Councillor ===
Maddin entered political life in 1997, narrowly defeating former councillor Glen Penner to win election for Saskatoon City Council in Ward 1. He focused his campaign on restoring public confidence in the police service, and was appointed to the city's Police Services Board after the election. Maddin promoted closer ties between the police and the city's aboriginal community in 2000, following allegations that two Saskatoon police officers may have abandoned an aboriginal man, Neil Stonechild, to freeze to death at the edge of the city. A liberal on social issues, he supported a $2000 payment to the United Way to promote non-discrimination against gay and lesbian people in 1998.

=== Mayor of Saskatoon ===
Maddin campaigned for Mayor of Saskatoon in 2000, and was elected in an upset over four-term incumbent Henry Dayday. His candidacy was endorsed by the Coalition of Progressive Electorates, and was fifty-two years old at the time.

Maddin's tenure as mayor was marked by several controversies involving police issues. He supported a review of the city's police services while campaigning for office in 2000, and was openly critical of police chief Dave Scott's management of the force.

Shortly after the election, the outgoing police services commission from the previous council voted to renew Scott's contract for a three-year period. Some in the local media described this decision as undemocratic, and as a defiance of Maddin's popular mandate. Following a brief period of cohabitation, the city exercised a clause in Scott's contract to remove him from office in June 2001. Maddin supported Scott's departure, arguing that it was necessary to ensure "a new direction for policing in Saskatoon". Russell Sabo was hired to replace Scott later in the year. Scott's dismissal was controversial in the city, and provoked antagonisms between Maddin and the city's police association. At one stage, the police association voted 93% non-confidence in Scott's replacement.

Maddin instituted policies of "community policing" during his time in office, wherein police officers set up 'neighborhood shops' to encourage public cooperation in targeting crime. The measure was enacted, in part, to improve ties between the police and Saskatchewan's aboriginal community. After leaving office in 2003, Maddin argued that the McNab Park area of Saskatoon saw a 38% crime reduction as a result of the policy. He also expressed concern that the new city administration would dismantle the initiative.

Maddin also supported efforts by the Saskatchewan Indian Gaming Authority (SIGA) to open a casino in Saskatoon, arguing that it would generate $1.5 million annually in property taxes while providing a financial benefit to the city's aboriginal community. Many city residents opposed this initiative, however, and there was credible speculation that it would be defeated by a plebiscite. In August 2003, the Saskatoon Tribal Council decided that it could not be assured of popular support in Saskatoon, and shifted its bid to the Whitecap Dakota-Sioux First Nation south of the city. Throughout the controversy, Maddin suggested that some opposition to the casino was grounded in racial prejudice.

A poll taken in early October 2003 showed Maddin with a lead over all challengers in his bid for re-election, and he was given official support from the Association of Civic Employees later in the same month. Ongoing controversies over the police and casino issues eroded his popularity, however, and he was sometimes depicted as lacking strong leadership on crime issues. He unexpectedly finished fourth behind winner and longtime rival Don Atchison, as well as behind Peter Zakreski and Jim Pankiw.

=== Unsuccessful bids ===
After leaving the mayor's office, Maddin speculated about turning to federal politics as a candidate of the Liberals or New Democratic Party. He joined the NDP in early 2004 and sought the party's nomination for Saskatoon-Wanuskewin in the 2004 federal election, but lost to rival candidate Priscilla Settee.

He campaigned for the Saskatoon-Wanuskewin nomination again for the 2006 election, and this time was selected by the party. He finished third against Conservative incumbent Maurice Vellacott in the general election.

Maddin made a comeback attempt for mayor of Saskatoon in the 2006 election, and again lost to Atchison. This time Maddin finished third behind Lenore Swystun, who had succeeded Maddin as Ward 1 Councillor in 2000.

=== Mayor of Asquith ===
In 2009, Maddin was elected mayor of the town of Asquith, Saskatchewan. He resigned on March 11, 2015.

== Election results ==
2006 Canadian federal election: Saskatoon—Wanuskewin
Party	Candidate	Votes	%	±%	Expenditures
Conservative	Maurice Vellacott	17,753	49.39	+2.74	$62,331.71
Liberal	Chris Axworthy	8,655	24.08	−8.50	$52,437.43
New Democratic	Jim Maddin	7,939	22.09	+4.27	$35,098.35
Green	Don Cameron	1,292	3.59	+0.63	$880.29
Christian Heritage	Dale Sanders	307	0.85	−0.90	$1,552.99
Total valid votes		35,946	100.00		
Total rejected ballots		96	0.27	+0.03	
Turnout		36,042	67.35	+7.63	
Electors on the lists		53,513			

2006 Saskatoon mayoral election
Candidate	Votes	%
Don Atchison	38,378	63.9
Lenore Swystun	13,539	22.5
Jim Maddin	5,610	9.3
Ron Kocsis	1,193	2.1
3 other candidates	1,346	2.2
Total	60,066	100.00

2003 Saskatoon mayoral election
Candidate	Votes	%
Don Atchison	24,670	30.3
Peter Zakreski	20,760	25.5
Jim Pankiw	18,432	22.7
Jim Maddin	15,448	18.9
2 other candidates	2,041	2.5
Total	81,351	100.00

2000 Saskatoon mayoral election
Candidate	Votes	%
Jim Maddin	14,202	35.3
Donna Birkmaier	12,507	31.1
Henry Dayday	10,117	25.2
3 other candidates	3,364	8.4
Total	40,190	100.00

== See also ==
- List of mayors of Saskatoon
