= Bankend, Saskatchewan =

Community in Saskatchewan, Canada

Bankend
- Location of Bankend in Saskatchewan Bankend (Canada)
- Coordinates: 51.517°N 103.85°W
- Country: Canada
- Province: Saskatchewan
- Region: Central
- Census division: Division No. 10

Area
  - Total: 500.488 km^{2} (193.239 sq mi)

Population (2001)
  - Total: 95
  - Density: 0.19/km^{2} (0.49/sq mi)
- Postal code: S0A 0G0
- Area code: 306

Bankend is a locality in the central part of Saskatchewan, Canada. Other communities in the area include Foam Lake, Ituna, Leslie, Wishart, West Bend and Leross. Bankend is located between the Touchwood Hills and the Beaver Hills. Bankend was a booming agricultural community in 1928, Highway 35 arrived, and four grain elevators were built.

== Demographics ==
In the 2021 Census of Population conducted by Statistics Canada, Bankend had a population of 15 living in 10 of its 10 total private dwellings, a change of 0% from its 2016 population of 15. With a land area of 0.28 km^{2} (0.11 sq mi), it had a population density of 53.6/km^{2} (138.7/sq mi) in 2021.

== Transportation ==
Bankend is located on Highway 35 and near the junction of Highway 35 and Highway 743.

== Notable people ==
- Henry Dayday, Saskatoon mayor was born near Bankend.

== Education ==
- Cresswell School Division #2074 was a one-room school house which was built near Bankend, SK.
