= List of elections in 2018 =

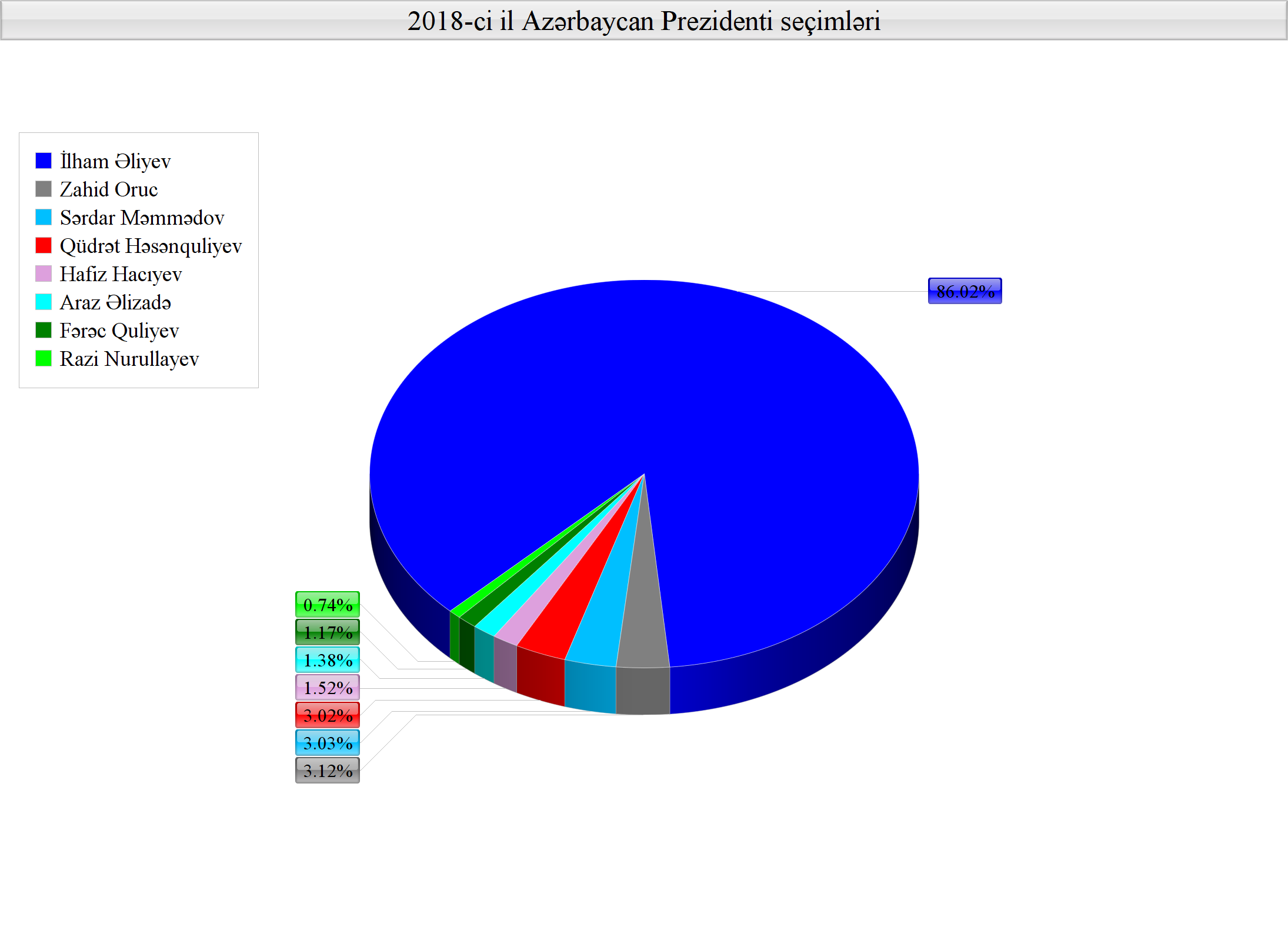
2018 Azerbaijani Presidential Elections Results

The following elections occurred in 2018. The National Democratic Institute also maintains a calendar of elections around the world.

== Africa ==
- 2018 Djiboutian parliamentary election 23 February 2018
- 2018 Sierra Leonean general election 7 and 31 March 2018
- 2018 Egyptian presidential election 26–28 March 2018
- 2018 Tunisian local elections 6 May 2018
- 2018 Réunion's 7th constituency by-election to the French national assembly 6 July 2018
- 2018 Malian presidential election 29 July 2018
- 2018 Zimbabwean general election 30 July 2018
- 2018 Swazi general election 18 August and 21 September 2018
- 2018 Rwandan parliamentary election 3 September 2018
- 2018 Mauritanian parliamentary election 1 and 15 September 2018
- 2018 Gabonese legislative election 6 and 27 October 2018
- 2018 Cameroonian presidential election 7 October 2018
- 2018 São Toméan legislative election 7 October 2018
- 2018 Ethiopian presidential election 25 October 2018
- 2018 Malagasy presidential election 7 November and 19 December 2018
- 2018 Togolese parliamentary election 20 December 2018
- Democratic Republic of the Congo general election, 2018 30 December 2018

== Asia ==
- 2018 Egyptian presidential election 26–28 March 2018
- 2018 Sri Lankan local elections 10 February 2018
- India:
  - 2018 Indian Rajya Sabha elections 16 January, 23 March, and 21 June 2018
  - 2018 Tripura Legislative Assembly election 18 February 2018
  - 2018 Meghalaya Legislative Assembly election 27 February 2018
  - 2018 Nagaland Legislative Assembly election 27 February 2018
  - 2018 Karnataka Legislative Assembly election 12 May, 28 May, and 11 June 2018
  - 2018 Chhattisgarh Legislative Assembly election 12 and 20 November 2018
  - 2018 Mizoram Legislative Assembly election 28 November 2018
  - 2018 Madhya Pradesh Legislative Assembly election 28 November 2018
  - 2018 Rajasthan Legislative Assembly election 7 December 2018
- Nepalese National Assembly election, 7 February 2018
- Pakistan:
  - 2018 Pakistani Senate election 3 March 2018
  - 2018 Pakistani general election 25 July 2018
  - 2018 Balochistan provincial election 25 July 2018
  - 2018 Khyber Pakhtunkhwa provincial election 25 July 2018
  - 2018 Punjab provincial election 25 July 2018
  - 2018 Sindh provincial election 25 July 2018
  - October 2018 Pakistani by-elections 14 October 2018 and 21 October 2018
  - 2018 Pakistani presidential election 4 September 2018
- 2018 Nepalese presidential election 13 March 2018
- 2018 Turkmen parliamentary election 25 March 2018
- 2018 Armenian parliamentary election 9 December 2018
- 2018 Armenian presidential election 2 March 2018
- 2018 Azerbaijani presidential election 11 April 2018
- 2018 Bhutanese National Council election 20 April 2018
- 2018 Russian elections
  - 2018 Russian presidential election 18 March 2018
  - By-elections to the State Duma 9 September 2018
  - 2018 Russian gubernatorial elections 9 September- 16 December 2018
  - 2018 Russian regional elections 9, 16, and 23 September 2018
- 2018 Malaysian general election 9 May 2018
- 2018 South Korean local elections 13 June 2018
- 2018 Syrian local elections 16 September 2018
- 2018 Turkish general election 24 June 2018
- 2018 Indonesian local elections 27 June 2018
- 2018 Cambodian general election 29 July 2018
- 2018 Georgian presidential election 28 October and 28 November 2018
- 2018 Bhutanese National Assembly election 15 September and 18 October 2018
- 2018 Maldivian presidential election 23 September 2018
- 2018 Afghan parliamentary election 20 October 2018
- 2018 Myanmar by-elections 3 November 2018
- 2018 Taiwanese local elections 24 November 2018
- 2018 Bangladeshi general election 30 December 2018

== Middle East ==
- 2018 Lebanese general election 6 May 2018
- 2018 Iraqi parliamentary election 12 May 2018
- 2018 Iraqi presidential election 2 October 2018
- 2018 Kurdistan Region parliamentary election 20 October 2018
- 2018 Israeli municipal elections 30 October 2018 and 13 November 2018
- Bahraini general election, 2018 24 November and 1 December 2018

== Europe ==
- Czech Republic
  - 2018 Trutnov by-election 5-6 and 12–13 January 2018
  - 2018 Czech presidential election 12–13 January 2018 and 26–27 January 2018
  - 2018 Zlín by-election 18 and 19 May 2018 and 25 and 26 May 2018
  - 2018 Czech municipal elections 5 and 6 October 2018
  - 2018 Czech Senate election 5 and 6 October 2018
- 2018 Cypriot presidential election 28 January and 4 February 2018
- 2018 Finnish presidential election 28 January 2018
- France
  - 2018 Val-d'Oise's 1st constituency by-election 28 January and 4 February 2018
  - 2018 Territoire de Belfort's 1st constituency by-election 28 January and 4 February 2018
  - 2016-18 Montenegrin municipal elections 4 February and 20–27 May 2018
  - 2018 Haute-Garonne's 8th constituency by-election 11 March and 18 March 2018
  - 2018 Loiret's 4th constituency by-election 18 March and 25 March 2018
  - 2018 Mayotte's 1st constituency by-election 18 March and 25 March 2018
  - 2018 Essonne's 1st constituency by-election 18 November and 25 November 2018
- 2018 Monegasque general election 11 February 2018
- 2018 Armenian presidential election 2 March 2018
- 2018 Italian general election 4 March 2018
- 2018 Russian elections
  - 2018 Russian presidential election 18 March 2018
  - By-elections to the State Duma 9 September 2018
  - 2018 Russian gubernatorial elections 9 September- 16 December 2018
  - 2018 Russian regional elections 9, 16, and 23 September 2018
- 2018 Dutch municipal elections 21 March 2018
- 2018 Hungarian parliamentary election 8 April 2018
- 2018 Azerbaijani presidential election 11 April 2018
- Montenegro
  - 2018 Montenegrin presidential election 15 April 2018
  - 2018 Montenegrin municipal elections 4 February and 20-27 May 2018
- 2018 United Kingdom local elections 3 May 2018
- 2018 Icelandic municipal elections 26 May 2018
- 2018 Slovenian parliamentary election 3 June 2018
- 2018 Slovenian local elections 18 November 2018
- 2018 Turkish general election 24 June 2018
- 2018 Serbian local elections 2018
- 2018 Swedish general election 9 September 2018
- 2018 Slovakian local elections 18 November 2018
- 2018 Macedonian referendum 30 September 2018
- 2018 Latvian parliamentary election 6 October 2018
- 2018 Bosnian general election 7 October 2018
- 2018 Belgian local elections 14 October 2018
- 2018 Luxembourg general election 14 October 2018
- 2018 Bavarian state election 14 October 2018
- 2018 Irish presidential election 26 October 2018
- 2018 Hessian state election 28 October 2018
- 2018 Georgian presidential election 28 October and 28 November 2018
- 2018 Donbass general elections 11 November 2018
- 2018 Andalusian regional election 2 December 2018
- 2018 Armenian parliamentary election 9 December 2018

== North America ==
- 2018 Trinidad and Tobago presidential election 19 January 2018
- 2018 Costa Rican general election 4 February and 1 April 2018
- 2018 Sint Maarten general election 26 February 2018
- 2018 Salvadoran legislative election 4 March 2018
- 2018 Cuban parliamentary election 11 March 2018
- 2018 Grenadian general election 13 March 2018
- 2018 Greenlandic general election 24 April 2018
- 2018 Barbadian general election 24 May 2018
- Canadian electoral calendar, 2018
  - 2018 Ontario general election 7 June 2018
  - 2018 New Brunswick general election 24 September 2018
  - 2018 Quebec general election 1 October 2018
- 2018 Mexican general election 1 July 2018
- 2018 United States elections 6 November 2018

== South America ==
- 2018 French Guiana's 2nd constituency by-election 4 March and 11 March 2018
- 2018 Colombian parliamentary election 11 March 2018
- 2018 Paraguayan general election 22 April 2018
- 2018 Venezuelan presidential election 20 May 2018
- 2018 Colombian presidential election 27 May and 17 June 2018
- 2018 Brazilian general election 7 and 28 October 2018
- 2018 Venezuelan municipal elections 9 December 2018

== Oceania ==
- Australia
  - 2018 Tasmanian state election 3 March 2018
  - 2018 South Australian state election 17 March 2018
  - 2018 Victorian state election 24 November 2018
- 2018 Wallis and Futuna's 1st constituency by-election 15 April 2018
- 2018 French Polynesian legislative election 22 April and 6 May 2018
- 2018 Cook Islands general election 14 June 2018
- 2018 New Caledonian independence referendum 4 November 2018
- Fijian parliamentary election, 2018 14 November 2018

== See also ==
- List of next general elections
