= 2009 Saskatchewan municipal elections =

Elections in Canada

Municipal elections in Saskatchewan were held on various dates throughout 2009. Voters in the Canadian province of Saskatchewan elected the mayors and councillors in all resort villages on July 25; the mayors and councillors in all northern municipalities on various dates throughout the fall; and the mayors and councillors in all cities, towns, villages and the even-numbered division councillors in all rural municipalities on October 28.

Listed below are selected municipal mayoral and city councillor races across the province. An "(X)" is listed next to the incumbent's name, where it applies.

== Resort villages ==
Elections in Saskatchewan’s resort villages were held on July 25.

== Northern municipalities ==
Elections in Saskatchewan’s northern municipalities were held on various dates throughout the fall, as provincial legislation allows these municipalities to each schedule their elections on a variety of date options.

== Cities, towns, and villages ==
Elections in Saskatchewan’s cities, towns, and villages were held on October 28, 2009.

=== Estevan ===
Candidate	Vote	%
Gary St. Onge (X)	Acclaimed	

=== Lloydminster ===
Candidate	Vote	%
Jeff Mulligan	2,141	50.6
Ken Baker (X)	1,802	42.6
Robert Rody	285	6.7

=== Melfort ===
Candidate	Vote	%
Kevin Phillips (X)	978	86.3
Holly Simmans	155	13.7

=== Moose Jaw ===
Candidate	Vote	%
Glenn Hagel	6,445	64.5
Stanley Koch	2,749	27.5
Ernie Penney	590	5.9
Karen Andersen Tyers	213	2.1

=== North Battleford ===
Candidate	Vote	%
Ian Hamilton	1,524	40.9
Brad Pattinson	1,509	40.5
Wayne Ray	293	7.9
Joyce Salie	224	6.0
Reid Stewart	174	4.7

=== Prince Albert ===
Candidate	Vote	%
Jim Scarrow (X)	4,239	51.0
Jim Stiglitz	2,832	34.1
Riley Simonite	1,235	14.9

=== Regina ===
Candidate	Vote	%
Pat Fiacco (X)	30,093	84.2
Jim Elliott	4,225	11.8
Linda White	1,423	4.0

=== Saskatoon ===
Candidate	Vote	%
Don Atchison (X)	26,676	57.7
Lenore Swystun	17,678	38.3
Johnny Melenchuk	736	1.6
Roger M. Chernoff	709	1.5
Steve Lawrance	407	0.9

=== Swift Current ===
Candidate	Vote	%
Jerrod Schafer	2,726	52.1
Don Robinson	1,717	32.9
Stacey Ellertson	753	14.4

=== Weyburn ===
Candidate	Vote	%
Debra Button (X)	2,139	90.5
Bruce Croft	225	9.5

=== Yorkton ===
Candidate	Vote	%
James Wilson	2,099	50.7
Randy Goulden	2,045	49.3

== Rural municipalities ==
Elections in Saskatchewan’s rural municipalities were held on October 28 to elect even-numbered division councillors.

== See also ==
- List of municipal elections in Saskatchewan
