= Clifford Wright (politician) =

Canadian politician

Clifford Emerson Wright OC SOM

Mayor of Saskatoon
- In office 1976–1988
- Preceded by: Bert Sears
- Succeeded by: Henry Dayday

Saskatoon City Alderman
- In office 1967–1976

Personal details
- Born: September 21, 1927 Saskatoon, Saskatchewan, Canada
- Died: December 9, 2014 (aged 87) Saskatoon, Saskatchewan, Canada
- Spouse: Betty Dye
- Occupation: Carpenter and business owner

Clifford Emerson Wright, OC SOM (September 21, 1927 – December 9, 2014) was a Canadian politician who served as the mayor of Saskatoon, the largest city in the central Canadian province of Saskatchewan, from 1976 to 1988. At the time he left office after 12 years, he was the longest-serving mayor in the city's history, although his tenure has since been surpassed by Don Atchison, who was mayor for 13 years.

== Early life and career ==
Wright was born and raised in Saskatoon, the fifth of five children to Sam and Ada Wright. He attended Albert and Victoria Elementary School, and Nutana Collegiate. After high school, he studied engineering at the University of Saskatchewan, although he left before completing his degree to join Smith Brothers and Wilson in 1947 as an apprentice carpenter. There he rose through the ranks, eventually becoming the company's Vice President in Saskatchewan, and in 1987 he bought out the company's Saskatchewan assets and started Wright Construction. Along with his son, Lorne, Wright oversaw the company as it became the largest general contractor based in Saskatchewan, working on projects from British Columbia to Ontario.

== Political career ==
=== Saskatoon City Council ===
Wright first ran for Saskatoon City Council in 1965, but he was unsuccessful in his bid. He ran again and was elected, joining Council in 1967 and serving in that role until 1976.

=== Mayor of Saskatoon ===
In 1976 Wright ran for mayor, beginning what was an unprecedented tenure in the mayor's office. He would win four successive terms, the first to do so after mayoral terms were extended beyond one year in 1954. In addition, Wright was the first mayor of Saskatoon to have been born in the city. During his 12 years as mayor, Wright oversaw a period of significant investment in public projects, playing a key role in the development of the Meewasin Valley Authority, Wanuskewin Heritage Park, Saskatchewan Place, and a variety of other recreational facilities and city infrastructure. During this time he was also appointed Chairman of PotashCorp. Wright opted not to run for re-election in 1988.

=== Treaty Commissioner ===
Upon leaving the mayor's office, Wright became the Treaty Commissioner for the federal government from 1989 to 1996. In that role, he worked with the Federation of Saskatchewan Indian Nations and helped to shape the Treaty Land Entitlement Agreement signed by the federal and provincial governments and 25 Saskatchewan First Nations in 1992.

== Personal life ==
Wright continued to play a role in public life throughout the 1990s, sitting on the boards of City and Royal University Hospitals and serving as the first chair of the Saskatoon Health Board from 1992-1995.

Wright was married to Betty and had four children - Lorne, Jack, Don, and Nancy, along with ten grandchildren and two great-grandchildren. His grandson James Wright is an ice hockey forward who played for the Winnipeg Jets. Wright was for many years involved in community service organizations, such as the Saskatchewan Abilities Council, the YMCA and YWCA, and Big Brothers and Big Sisters, among others.

Wright died from lung cancer while in palliative care at St. Paul's Hospital in Saskatoon on December 9, 2014, aged 87.

== Awards and legacy ==
In 1988 Wright was awarded an honorary Doctor of Laws degree from the University of Saskatchewan. In 1998 he was made an Officer of the Order of Canada in recognition of "his contributions to province and country." In 1999 he was awarded the Saskatchewan Order of Merit and in 2005 the Saskatchewan Centennial Medal.

Wright is the namesake of the Cliff Wright branch of the Saskatoon Public Library, located at the Lakewood Civic Centre in Wildwood, along with a number of streets in Arbor Creek.

== See also ==
- List of mayors of Saskatoon
