= Pat Lorje =

Canadian politician

The Honourable Pat Lorje ECS

Saskatoon City Councillor for Ward 2
- In office 2006-2016
- Preceded by: Owen Fortosky
- Succeeded by: Hilary Gough

MLA for Saskatoon Southeast
- In office 1991–2003
- Preceded by: Riding created
- Succeeded by: Don Morgan

Saskatoon City Alderman for Ward 2
- In office 1979–1991

Personal details
- Born: January 24, 1947 (age 79) Eastend, Saskatchewan
- Party: New Democratic Party
- Education: University of Saskatchewan
- Occupation: Psychologist

Pat Lorje (pronounced "lor ee eh") is a retired Canadian politician. She represented the riding of Saskatoon Southeast in the Saskatchewan Legislature from 1991 to 2003, and also served two stints as a Saskatoon City Councillor, serving a total of 22 years on Council.

== Early life and career ==
Lorje was born in Eastend, Saskatchewan in 1947 and attended school in the hamlet of Caron, near Moose Jaw. Her father, Rod Wilkening, was a pilot with the Royal Canadian Air Force who served in the Second World War and re-enlisted during the Korean War; however, he was killed in a car accident before leaving to Korea. Lorje was the oldest of four children left to their mother, Phyllis. Growing up in relative poverty, Lorje secured a governor general's scholarship and attended the University of Saskatchewan in Saskatoon and earned a bachelor's degree in psychology. As an undergraduate she got involved in politics, serving on student council. After graduating she put graduate studies on hold for three years to move to Holland with her husband, Ted. They returned to Saskatoon in 1972 and Lorje completed a master's degree in psychology, and she was subsequently hired as the first psychologist at the Saskatoon Mental Health Centre.

== Political career ==
=== Saskatoon City Council ===
Lorje's first foray into politics outside of university was as an alderman when she was elected to Saskatoon City Council in 1979 to represent Ward 2. She decided to run because working with women as a psychologist had made her realize that urban design and politics was a significant determinant of mental health. Her first inclination had been to run for provincial office with the New Democratic Party in 1979, but Premier Allan Blakeney called the election in 1978, leaving her without time to prepare. Accordingly, she turned her attention to the municipal realm. Her 1979 win in Ward 2 was by a margin of less than 200 votes, but Lorje went on to serve four successive terms in the role and was influential in her priority areas of women, seniors, health, and social issues. She was also the founding Chair of Council's Race Relations Committee. The 1988 election was the first outside of the ward system since 1972, and Lorje received more than 33,000 votes, topping even Henry Dayday, who was elected as mayor.

In one 1988 incident, Lorje drove a city bus 11 blocks as part of celebrations marking the 75th anniversary of Saskatoon Transit. She was fined $55 for driving the bus without a proper license, and she paid the fine in loonies, calling the charge "ludicrous."

=== NDP MLA ===
Although Lorje was seen as a popular councillor and a potential contender for the mayoralty after her resounding 1988 electoral win, Lorje left City Council in 1991 in order to move to provincial politics. As member of the New Democratic Party, she was elected as MLA for Saskatoon Southeast (then Saskatoon Wildwood) that year. She ultimately served three terms, being re-elected in 1995 and 1999, before retiring from provincial politics in 2003. Her last win in 1999 was by a narrow margin of just 38 votes, which resulted in a short court battle with the losing Liberal candidate, Grant Karwacki. One court-ordered recount actually put Karwacki ahead, but Lorje ultimately retained the seat on appeal. Through this time she had remained a popular figure in Saskatoon and was widely speculated to be considering a run for mayor 1997, though she announced that fall that she would not pursue the mayoralty as she had a duty to fulfill her term as MLA.

Lorje's final term as MLA included cabinet positions in Lorne Calvert's government after being persistently left out of cabinet by Roy Romanow, who retired in 2000. Lorje held posts in Aboriginal Affairs, Post Secondary Education and Skills Training, and Environment; she also served as Provincial Secretary in 2001. She wrote a report that formed the basis of the provincial government's immigration policy and also became the first minister to visit every First Nation in Saskatchewan. She briefly stepped away from cabinet in the spring of 2002 following an allegation of harassment from a staff member. An investigation found that she had touched the face of an aide in an inappropriate way, which media reports referred to as an "affectionate slap," and Lorje was allowed to return to cabinet. However, she was subsequently fired from cabinet by Calvert in June for revealing details about the incident to the media. When she announced her retirement from provincial politics in 2003, she cited in part the "prudish judgementalism" of the media for making her decision. She was also critical of the bitter partisanship at the Legislature, saying that it was "more like being in political theatre than serving the people."

=== Return to Saskatoon City Council ===
After leaving provincial politics, Lorje decided to return to the municipal realm, citing her preference for the non-partisan nature of municipal politics. Lorje was elected to once again represent Ward 2 on Saskatoon City Council in the 2006 municipal election. In a crowded 8-person field, she secured 48% of the vote. During her second stint on Council, Lorje advocated consistently for greater transparency and access at City Hall, for continued non-partisanship, and fought against reducing the frequency of Council meetings, as well as the use of consultants by the City. However, she often found herself isolated on a variety of issues, such as being in favour of banning plastic bags and being against a future 33rd Street bridge, which earned her a reputation as a "fiercely independent voice" on Council, although also an uncompromising one. Lorje was re-elected in 2009 with 76% of the vote and again 2012, fending off a challenge from former Ward 2 councillor Owen Fortosky.

In 2014, Lorje was sanctioned by Council for revealing details of a confidential report to a member of the public, which was shown to be a former MLA colleague, Eric Cline. Lorje was defiant about the charge, alleging that it was not an uncommon practice, but for one year she could access confidential documents only at City Hall.

Lorje's 2012 win brought her within striking distance of the record for most time served on Saskatoon City Council. However, in the 2016 election she was upset by rookie candidate Hilary Gough, who defeated Lorje by a slim margin of 139 votes. The loss was the first for Lorje, who by 2016 had served 34 years between City Council and the Legislature.

== Personal life ==
Lorje remained involved in the community after her time on Council, including serving on the board of the local Montgomery Place Community Association. However, in 2018 Lorje resigned from the board, citing the "racist attitudes" of some board members when the community was seen as divided over a proposal by the Saskatoon Tribal Council to establish a pre-school in the neighbourhood.

Over the years, Lorje was also involved with festival boards, including as a founding member of the 25th Street Theatre's Fringe Festival. She was also on the board for Saskatoon City Hospital for 10 years.

Owing to her time working at the airport in Rotterdam, Lorje is fluent in five languages. She is also a pianist and spent time as a marathon runner. Lorje ran six marathons and once organized a fitness competition between Saskatoon and Tartu, Estonia.

Lorje's first husband Ted died from cancer in 1987. She eventually married playwright and theatre director Tom Bentley-Fisher, and the couple briefly moved to San Francisco after her retirement from provincial politics.

== Electoral record (provincial) ==
1999 Saskatchewan general election: Saskatoon Southeast
Party	Candidate	Votes	%	±%
NDP	Pat Lorje	3,172	38.25	-10.74
Liberal	Grant Karwacki	3,134	37.79	-3.53
Saskatchewan	Dennis Reaburn	1,987	23.96	*
Total		8,293	100.00	
New Democratic hold		Swing		-

1995 Saskatchewan general election: Saskatoon Southeast
Party	Candidate	Votes	%	±%
NDP	Pat Lorje	3,450	48.99	+5.80
Liberal	Wallace Lockhart	2,910	41.32	+9.82
Progressive Conservative	Marcel Guay	682	9.69	-15.62
Total		7,042	100.00	
New Democratic hold		Swing		-

1991 Saskatchewan general election: Saskatoon Wildwood
Party	Candidate	Votes	%	±%
NDP	Pat Lorje	4,282	43.19	*
Liberal	David M. Clark	3,123	31.50	*
Progressive Conservative	Joan Black	2,509	25.31	*
Total		9,914	100.00	
