= Mir Mohammad Asim Kurd Gello =

Pakistani politician

Member of the Provincial Assembly of Balochistan
- In office 29 Feb 2024 – Till now

Personal details
- Born: 29 December 1957 (age 68) Quetta, Balochistan, Pakistan
- Party: PMLN (2013-present)
- Other political affiliations: PML N (2013-2018) BAP (2018-2023) PML N(2024-now PML(Q) (2008-2013); IND (2002)

Mir Mohammad Asim Kurd Gello (born 29 December 1957) is a Pakistani politician who is currently a Member of the Provincial Assembly of Balochistan from February 29, 2024.

== Early life and education ==
Born in Quetta, he earned his Bachelor of Arts degree from the University of Balochistan.

== Political career ==
He was elected to the Provincial Assembly of Balochistan from Constituency PB-30 Kachhi-I in the 2002 Pakistani general election. He was re-elected to the Provincial Assembly of Balochistan as a candidate of Pakistan Muslim League (Q) from Constituency PB-30 Bolan-I in 2008 Pakistani general election.

He was re-elected to the Provincial Assembly of Balochistan as an independent candidate from Constituency PB-30 Bolan-I in the 2013 Pakistani general election. He joined Pakistan Muslim League (N) in May 2013. in 2018 elections he lost his seat against his old rivalry Sardar Yar Muhammad Rind, but in 2024 elections he defeated his old Rivalry he got 22,557 votes and his runner up got 17,869 votes.
