= Municipal elections in Saskatchewan =

Elections in the Canadian province

Map of Saskatchewan.

Municipal elections in Saskatchewan are held every four years, and the schedule for these elections is determined by the municipality type as set by The Local Government Election Act, 2014. Previous to the current laws, municipal elections were set by The Local Government Election Act and then The Local Government Election Amendment Act, 2011.

For most municipality types, elections take place every fourth year in November. The most recent elections were the 2026 Saskatchewan municipal elections, held on November 9, 2026 in the rural municipalities (Even-numbered district councillors only).

== Election schedule ==
Saskatchewan has three municipality types and seven sub-types: urban municipalities (cities, towns, villages, and resort villages), rural municipalities, and northern municipalities (northern towns, northern villages and northern hamlets).

The schedule of elections by municipality type, as set by The Local Government Election Act, 2014, is as follows:

- Cities, towns, and villages: the 2nd Wednesday in November, every 4 years starting in 2016
- Resort villages: the last Saturday in July, every 4 years starting in 2016
- Northern municipalities: on a date in fall as chosen by the municipality, every 4 years starting in 2016
- Rural municipalities (even-numbered district councillors): on the 2nd Wednesday in November, every 4 years starting in 2014
- Rural municipalities (reeves and odd-numbered district councillors): 2nd Wednesday in November, every 4 years starting in 2016

== List of municipal elections ==
- 2006 Saskatchewan municipal elections
  - July 22 - Resort villages
  - October 25 - Cities, towns, and villages
  - October 25 - Rural municipalities (Reeves and odd-numbered district councillors)
  - Varies - Northern municipalities
- 2007 Saskatchewan municipal elections
  - October 24 - Rural municipalities (Even-numbered district councillors)
- 2008 Saskatchewan municipal elections
  - October 22 - Rural municipalities (Reeves and odd-numbered district councillors)
- 2009 Saskatchewan municipal elections
  - July 25 - Resort villages
  - October 28 - Cities, towns, and villages
  - October 28 - Rural municipalities (Even-numbered district councillors)
  - Varies - Northern municipalities
- 2010 Saskatchewan municipal elections
  - October 27 - Rural municipalities (Reeves and odd-numbered district councillors)
- 2011 Saskatchewan municipal elections
  - October 26 - Rural municipalities (Even-numbered district councillors)
- 2012 Saskatchewan municipal elections
  - July 28 - Resort villages
  - October 24 - Cities, towns, and villages
  - October 24 - Rural municipalities (Reeves and odd-numbered district councillors)
  - Varies - Northern municipalities
- 2014 Saskatchewan municipal elections
  - October 22 - Rural municipalities (Even-numbered district councillors)
- 2016 Saskatchewan municipal elections
  - July 30 - Resort villages
  - October 26 - Cities, towns, and villages
  - October 26 - Rural municipalities (Reeves and odd-numbered district councillors)
  - Varies - Northern municipalities
- 2018 Saskatchewan municipal elections
  - October 24 - Rural municipalities (Even-numbered district councillors)
- 2020 Saskatchewan municipal elections
  - August 29 - Resort villages (Note: Elections were rescheduled from the typical last Saturday in July date this year due to the COVID-19 pandemic.)
  - November 9 - Cities, towns, and villages
  - November 9 - Rural municipalities (Reeves and odd-numbered district councillors)
  - Varies - Northern municipalities
- 2022 Saskatchewan municipal elections
  - November 9 - Rural municipalities (Even-numbered district councillors)
- 2024 Saskatchewan municipal elections
  - July 27 - Resort villages
  - November 13 - Cities, towns, and villages
  - November 13 - Rural municipalities (Reeves and odd-numbered district councillors)
  - Varies - Northern municipalities
- 2026 Saskatchewan municipal elections
  - November 9 - Rural municipalities (Even-numbered district councillors)

=== Upcoming ===
- 2028 Saskatchewan municipal elections
  - July 29 - Resort villages
  - November 8 - Cities, towns, and villages
  - November 8 - Rural municipalities (Reeves and odd-numbered district councillors)
  - Varies - Northern municipalities

== See also ==
- Municipal elections in Canada
