= 2018 Canadian electoral calendar =

2018 elections in Canada

This is a list of elections in Canada scheduled to be held in 2018. Included are municipal, provincial and federal elections, by-elections on any level, referendums and party leadership races at any level. In bold are provincewide or federal elections (including provincewide municipal elections) and party leadership races.

== January to March ==
- January 10: Mayoral by-election in Gravelbourg, Saskatchewan
- January 17: Municipal by-election in the Rural Municipality of Torch River No. 488, Saskatchewan
- January 20: Municipal by-elections in Burns Lake and Hudson's Hope, British Columbia.
- **January 27: 2018 Saskatchewan Party leadership election**
- **February 3: 2018 British Columbia Liberal Party leadership election**
- February 5: Municipal by-election in Beaumont, Alberta.
- February 10: Lennox Island First Nation band on-reserve councillor by-election.
- February 14:
  - Provincial by-election in Kelowna West, British Columbia
  - Municipal by-election in Leader, Saskatchewan
- February 22: Municipal by-election in Coalhurst, Alberta
- February 24: Municipal by-election in Port Alice, British Columbia
- **February 27: 2018 Alberta Party leadership election**
- February 28: Municipal by-election in Osler, Saskatchewan
- March 1: Provincial by-elections in Kindersley, Melfort and Swift Current, Saskatchewan.
- **March 3: 2018 Saskatchewan New Democratic Party leadership election**
- March 7: Municipal by-election in Naicam, Saskatchewan
- **March 10: 2018 Progressive Conservative Party of Ontario leadership election**
- March 13: Municipal by-election in Happy Valley-Goose Bay

== April to May ==
- April 7:
  - **2018 New Democratic Party of Newfoundland and Labrador leadership election**
  - **2018 New Democratic Party of Prince Edward Island leadership election**
  - Municipal by-election in Cariboo Regional District, British Columbia
- April 10: Peter Ballantyne Cree Nation election for chief and 14 positions on the band council and 12 spots on the band's elders' council
- April 11:
  - Municipal by-election in Kindersley, Saskatchewan
  - Municipal by-election in Lougheed, Alberta
- April 20: Wei Wai Kum First Nation chief councillor by-election.
- **April 28: 2018 Progressive Conservative Party of Newfoundland and Labrador leadership election**
- May 5: Saulteau First Nations council by-election.
- May 7: Yukon School Council General Election
- May 13: Municipal by-election in Saint-Rémi, Quebec
- May 14: Municipal by-elections in Atholville, Bas-Caraquet, Bathurst, Dieppe, Fredericton Junction, Grande-Anse, Hartland, Kedgwick, Pointe-Verte, Saint-André, Saint-Léolin, Sainte-Marie-Saint-Raphaël and St. George, New Brunswick
- May 23: Municipal by-elections in Carlyle and Caronport, Saskatchewan

== June to July ==
- June 3: Municipal by-election in Lachute, Quebec
- **June 7: 2018 Ontario general election**
- June 9: Municipal by-election in Wells, British Columbia
- June 10: Municipal by-elections in Beloeil and Shawville, Quebec
- June 12:
  - St. Mary's First Nation elects a new chief and band council
  - Municipal by-election in Elk Point, Alberta.
  - Nisga'a Village Government by-election in Gingolx.
- June 18:
  - Federal by-election in Chicoutimi—Le Fjord, Quebec
  - Municipal by-election for a council seat in Wabush, Newfoundland and Labrador
- June 19: Provincial by-election in Cumberland South, Nova Scotia
- June 27: By-election in Codette, Saskatchewan, for three councillors and mayor
- June 28: Municipal by-election in Eston, Saskatchewan.
- June 30: Akwesasne District Council of Chiefs
- July 9: Municipal by-election in Bruderheim, Alberta
- July 12: Provincial by-elections in Fort McMurray-Conklin and Innisfail-Sylvan Lake, Alberta
- July 14: Municipal by-election in Kivimaa-Moonlight Bay, Saskatchewan
- July 17: Provincial by-election in St. Boniface, Manitoba
- July 23: Municipal by-election in Calmar, Alberta.
- July 27: Municipal elections in Dunnottar, Victoria Beach and Winnipeg Beach, Manitoba.

== August to October ==
- August 16: Municipal by-election in Brooks, Alberta
- September 10: Municipal by-election in Raymond, Alberta
- September 12: Provincial by-election in Regina Northeast, Saskatchewan
- September 19: Municipal by-election in Langham, Saskatchewan
- September 20: Provincial by-election in Windsor Lake, Newfoundland and Labrador
- **September 24: 2018 New Brunswick general election**
- **October 1: 2018 Quebec general election**
- October 11: Moose Cree First Nation council by-election
- October 14: Mayoral by-election in Témiscouata-sur-le-Lac, Quebec
- October 15: Northwest Territories municipal elections, 2018 (taxed communities)
- October 17: By-election for Moose Jaw council and Holy Trinity Roman Catholic Separate School Division No. 22.
- **October 18: Yukon municipal elections, 2018**
- **October 20: 2018 British Columbia municipal elections**
- October 21: Municipal by-election in L'Ange-Gardien, Outaouais, Quebec (du Plateau District)
- **October 22: 2018 Ontario municipal elections**
- October 24:
  - **2018 Manitoba municipal elections**
  - 2018 Saskatchewan municipal elections
  - Municipal by-election in Rosetown, Saskatchewan
- **October 27: 2018 Progressive Conservative Association of Nova Scotia leadership election**
- October 29: Municipal by-election in Redwater, Alberta

== November to December ==
- **November 3: Progressive Conservative Party of Saskatchewan leadership race**
- November 4: Municipal by-election in Contrecoeur, Quebec.
- **November 5: 2018 Prince Edward Island municipal elections**
- November 11: Municipal by-election in Marieville, Quebec.
- November 13: Calgary Olympic plebiscite.
- November 18: Municipal by-election in Nicolet, Quebec
- November 23: Bluewater District School Board trustee by-election for West Grey and Hanover.
- November 29:
  - Municipal by-election in Division No. 7, County of Minburn No. 27, Alberta
  - Conseil Scolaire Viamonde Area 8 (Chatham-Kent, Elgin, Haldimand-Norfolk, Lambton & Oxford) trustee by-election.
- December 3:
  - **Nunavut municipal elections, 2018** (hamlets)
  - Federal by-election in Leeds—Grenville—Thousand Islands and Rideau Lakes, Ontario
- October 22-December 7: 2018 British Columbia electoral reform referendum
- December 9: Municipal by-election in Neufchâtel-Lebourgneuf District, Quebec City
- December 10:
  - Northwest Territories municipal elections, 2018 (hamlets)
  - Provincial by-election in Roberval, Quebec
- December 16: Mayoral by-election in Rivière-des-Prairies–Pointe-aux-Trembles borough and council by-election in Saint-Michel, Montreal.

== To be determined ==
- Four federal by-elections were held in Burnaby South, Outremont, and York—Simcoe.

== See also ==
- Municipal elections in Canada
- Elections in Canada
