= 2016 Saskatchewan municipal elections =

Municipal elections held October 26, 2016

- Various dates

Municipal elections in Saskatchewan were held on various dates throughout 2016. Voters in the Canadian province of Saskatchewanelected the mayors and councillors in all resort villages on July 30; the mayors and councillors in all northern municipalities on various dates throughout the fall; and the mayors and councillors in all cities, towns, villages and the reeves and odd-numbered division councillors in all rural municipalities on October 26.

Listed below are selected municipal mayoral and city councillor races across the province. An "(X)" is listed next to the incumbent's name, where it applies.

== Election dates ==
Saskatchewan has held its municipal elections in the current fixed schedule since The Local Government Election Act, 2014. Municipal elections take place every four years starting in 2016 on the last Saturday in July for resort villages, on various dates in the fall for northern municipalities, and on the 2nd Wednesday in November for cities, towns, villages, and rural municipalities.

== Resort villages ==
Elections in Saskatchewan’s resort villages were held on July 30.

== Northern municipalities ==
Elections in Saskatchewan’s northern municipalities were held on various dates throughout the fall, as provincial legislation allows these municipalities to each schedule their elections on a variety of date options.

== Cities, towns, and villages ==
Elections in Saskatchewan’s cities, towns, and villages were held on October 26, 2016.

=== Estevan ===
Mayoral candidate	Vote	%
Roy Ludwig (X)	1,809	73.75
James Halladay	453	18.47
Rhyan Hagel	191	7.79

=== Humboldt ===
Mayoral candidate	Vote	%
Rob Muench	1,633	82.35
Harley Bentley	269	13.57
Shawn Wempe	81	4.08

=== Lloydminster ===
Mayoral candidate	Vote	%
Gerald Aalbers	4,081	67.94
Jason Whiting	1,719	28.62
Cheryl Ross	207	3.45

=== Martensville ===
==== Mayor ====
Mayoral candidate	Vote	%
Kent Muench (X)	Acclaimed	

==== Council ====
Candidate	Vote
Tyson Chillog (X)	625
Debbie McGuire	511
Michael Cox	500
Darren MacDonald (X)	497
Bob Blackwell (X)	483
Jamie Martens (X)	468
Travis Wiebe	425
Geoff Baker	352
Randy Elliott	294
Darnell Kuzek	258
Robert Postma	254
Marcia Cross	220

=== Meadow Lake ===
Mayoral candidate	Vote	%
Gary Vidal (X)	Acclaimed	

=== Melfort ===
Mayoral candidate	Vote	%
Rick Lang (X)	866	55.83
Nicole Gagné	593	38.23
Don J. Signori	92	5.93

=== Moose Jaw ===
Mayoral candidate	Vote	%
Fraser Tolmie	5,949	53.48
Deb Higgins (X)	3,469	31.19
Corey LaBuick	760	6.83
Robert Thomas	617	5.55
Dennis Brigham	328	2.95

=== North Battleford ===
Mayoral candidate	Vote	%
Ryan Bater	Acclaimed	

=== Pilot Butte ===
==== Mayor ====
Mayoral candidate	Vote	%
Peggy Chorney	334	60.73
Nat Ross (X)	152	27.64
Charlene Curtis	64	11.64

==== Council ====
Candidate	Vote	%	Elected
Nathan Schmidt (X)	366	66.55	✓
Lydia Riopka	279	50.73	✓
Teresa Blommaert	277	50.36	✓
Jean Lowenberger	258	46.91	✓
Bruce Mackenzie	258	46.91	✓
Ed Sigmeth (X)	244	44.36	✓
Ryan Unique	234	42.55	
Fred Salerno (X)	216	39.27	
Ed Zsombor (X)	211	38.36	
Gerhardt Ernst (X)	210	38.18	
Wayne Engel (X)	158	28.73	

=== Prince Albert ===
==== Mayor ====
Mayoral candidate	Vote	%
Greg Dionne (X)	4,450	43.49
Martin Ring	2,774	27.11
Josh Morrow	1,562	15.26
Conrad Burns	1,447	14.14

==== Council ====
Candidate	Vote	%
Ward 1
Charlene Miller (X)	596	70.37
Daniel Brown	251	29.63
Ward 2
Terra Lennox-Zepp	639	61.27
Rick Orr (X)	404	38.73
Ward 3
Evert Botha	583	52.01
Lee Atkinson (X)	538	47.99
Ward 4
Don Cody (X)	682	55.22
Robin Finlayson	553	44.78
Ward 5
Dennis Ogrodnick	794	44.91
Chad Mogg	675	38.18
Tim Scharkowski (X)	299	16.91
Ward 6
Blake Edwards	868	61.30
Bobbie Ehman	312	22.03
Mitch Dunning	236	16.67
Ward 7
Dennis Nowoselsky	532	40.64
Lou Doderai	374	28.57
L. Darren Whitehead	321	24.52
Dean Link	82	6.26
Ward 8
Ted Zurakowski (X)	Acclaimed	

=== Regina ===
==== Mayor ====
Mayoral candidate	Vote	%
Michael Fougere (X)	24,992	70.26
Tony Fiacco	4,092	11.50
Jim Elliott	3,306	9.29
Wayne Ast	2,413	6.78
Evangeline V. K. Godron	767	2.16

==== Council ====
Candidate	Vote	%
Ward 1
Barbara Young (X)	2,638	67.11
Bob Burnett	1,293	32.89
Ward 2
Bob Hawkins (X)	2,007	37.19
Carmen Lien	1,282	23.76
Sam Khan	797	14.77
Mike Parisone	715	13.25
Laur'Lei Silzer	520	9.64
Syed Tayyab	75	1.39
Ward 3
Andrew Stevens	2,204	65.40
Amanda Baker	493	14.63
Tamara Knight	331	9.82
Jeanné Clive	247	7.33
Brian Rieder	95	2.82
Ward 4
Lori Bresciani	2,067	40.15
Bryon Burnett (X)	2,008	39.01
Asfaw Debia	730	14.18
Chad Novak	343	6.66
Ward 5
John Findura (X)	2,648	87.92
Anthony Goodman	364	12.08
Ward 6
Joel Murray	501	26.65
Bill Stevenson	282	15.00
Femi Ogunrinde	276	14.68
Joe Daniels	204	10.85
Ashley Deacon	167	8.88
Shelley Lavallee	157	8.35
Connie Deiter	141	7.50
David Lerat	141	7.50
Trace Yellowtail	11	0.59
Ward 7
Sharron Bryce (X)	1,266	43.48
John Gross	932	32.01
Leanne McKay	213	7.31
Jonas Cossette	150	5.15
Nishchal Bhagi	128	4.40
James Dulmage	127	4.36
Ameer Gill	96	3.30
Ward 8
Mike O'Donnell (X)	1,533	57.42
David Chapados	488	18.28
Ron Blashill	437	16.37
Gene Howie	212	7.94
Ward 9
Jason Mancinelli	1,835	53.88
Aidan Wotherspoon	1,372	40.28
Terry Hincks* (X)	199	5.84
Ward 10
Jerry Flegel (X)	2,221	59.56
Brian Sklar	947	25.40
Rickey Turchet	561	15.04

* Hincks died on October 14, after nominations had closed, and therefore remained on the ballot.

=== Saskatoon ===
==== Mayor ====
Mayoral candidate	Vote	%
Charlie Clark	32,565	40.70
Don Atchison (X)	29,518	36.89
Kelley Moore	17,381	21.72
Devon Hein	548	0.68

==== Council ====
Candidate	Vote	%
Ward 1
Darren Hill (X)	4,761	68.40
Wes Cameron	1,231	17.68
Tyrell Alexander	600	8.62
Jeff Wortman	369	5.30
Ward 2
Hilary Gough	2,437	40.31
Pat Lorje (X)	2,298	38.01
Mark Zielke	514	8.50
Vernon J. Linklater	475	7.86
Kelly Parker	214	3.54
Robert Godfrey	108	1.79
Ward 3
Ann Iwanchuk (X)	3,850	72.90
Mark Mills	1,431	27.10
Ward 4
Troy Davies (X)	5,025	81.22
Tobi Loopkey	1,162	18.78
Ward 5
Randy Donauer (X)	5,202	64.28
Paul Miazga	2,891	35.72
Ward 6
Cynthia Block	3,631	37.72
Mark Prebble	2,548	26.47
Mike McKague	1,826	18.97
Josie Steeves	761	7.90
Troy Wruck	507	5.27
Howard Fullford	179	1.86
Ian Rambally	175	1.82
Ward 7
Mairin Loewen (X)	8,374	81.51
Monique Koskie	1,899	18.49
Ward 8
Sarina Gersher	4,396	65.25
Evan Drisner	2,341	34.75
Ward 9
Bev Dubois	3,211	34.00
Roxanne Kaminski	1,819	19.26
Robin Mowat	1,792	18.98
Jeff Jackson	1,447	15.32
David Cook	611	6.47
Thomas Hrynuik	409	4.33
Aaron Kernaghan	154	1.63
Ward 10
Zach Jeffries (X)	7,126	77.45
Mattea Merta	2,075	22.55

=== Swift Current ===
Mayoral candidate	Vote	%
Denis Perrault	4,058	87.23
Kathy Fraser	376	8.08
Maria Rose Lewans	218	4.69

=== Warman ===
Mayoral candidate	Vote	%
Sheryl Spence (X)	1,466	61.08
Ivan Gabrysh	934	38.92

=== Weyburn ===
Mayoral candidate	Vote	%
Marcel Roy	2,347	57.06
Deb Button (X)	1,766	42.94

=== Yorkton ===
Mayoral candidate	Vote	%
Bob Maloney (X)	1,933	41.26
Chris Wyatt	1,900	40.55
Calvin Tokarchuk	729	15.56
Andrew Probe	123	2.63

== Rural municipalities ==
Elections in Saskatchewan’s rural municipalities were held on October 26 to elect reeves and odd-numbered division councillors.

=== Corman Park No. 344 ===
Reeve candidate	Vote	%
Judy Harwood (X)	Acclaimed	

== See also ==
- List of municipal elections in Saskatchewan
