= 2007 Saskatchewan municipal elections =

Elections in Canada

Municipal elections in Saskatchewan were held on October 24, 2007. Voters in the Canadian province of Saskatchewan elected the even-numbered division councillors in all rural municipalities.

== See also ==
- List of municipal elections in Saskatchewan
