= 2026 Saskatchewan municipal elections =

Elections in Canada

- November 9, 2026

Municipal elections in Saskatchewan were held on November 9, 2026. Voters in the Canadian province of Saskatchewan elected the even-numbered division councillors in all rural municipalities, as well as additional offices in the Rural Municipality of Sherwood No. 159.

Listed below are selected municipal councillor races across the province. An "(X)" is listed next to the incumbent's name, where it applies.

== Election date ==
Saskatchewan has held its municipal elections in the current fixed schedule since The Local Government Election Act, 2014. Since then, municipal elections have taken place for even-numbered divisions in rural municipalities in every fourth year beginning in 2014.

== Results ==
=== Corman Park No. 344 ===
Corman Park No. 344 council
Candidate	Vote	%
Division 2
Tarren Pederson	218	54.36
Michelle Chuhaniuk	159	39.65
Kyle Jantzen	24	5.99
Division 4
David Greenwood (X)	Acclaimed	
Division 6
Shaun May	96	87.27
Steven Balzer (X)	14	12.72
Division 8
Wendy Trask (X)	132	56.17
Ashley Hubbard	62	26.38
Brent Priel	41	17.45

=== Edenwold No. 158 ===
Edenwold No. 158 council
Candidate	Vote	%
Division 2
Randy Schulz	136	60.44
Ashley Fullerton	89	39.56
Division 4
Karen Kotylak (X)	Acclaimed	
Division 6
Tim Brodt (X)	85	51.83
Glenn Lechner	79	48.17

=== Prince Albert No. 461 ===
Prince Albert No. 461 council
Candidate	Vote	%
Division 2
Tyler Hazelwood (X)	Acclaimed	
Division 4
Richard Wilson (X)	57	50.89
DJ Harris	55	49.11
Division 6
Richard Sayers	Acclaimed	

=== Sherwood No. 159 ===
The Rural Municipality of Sherwood No. 159 held elections for its even-numbered division councillors, as well as its reeve and Division 3 councillor, as those offices sat vacant.

==== Reeve ====
Sherwood No. 159 reeve
Candidate	Vote	%
Carl Husum	Acclaimed	

==== Council ====
Sherwood No. 159 council
Candidate	Vote	%
Division 2
Parker Schikowski	48	90.57
Draedon Hozempa	3	5.66
Dan Hebert	2	3.77
Division 3
John Wilke	40	81.63
Harry Frank	9	18.37
Division 4
Christopher Reynolds (X)	Acclaimed	
Division 6
Jeff Poissant	Acclaimed	

== See also ==
- List of municipal elections in Saskatchewan
