= 2010 Saskatchewan municipal elections =

Elections in Canada

Municipal elections in Saskatchewan were held on October 27, 2010. Voters in the Canadian province of Saskatchewan elected the reeves and odd-numbered division councillors in all rural municipalities.

== See also ==
- List of municipal elections in Saskatchewan
