= List of census divisions of Saskatchewan =

Census divisions of Saskatchewan
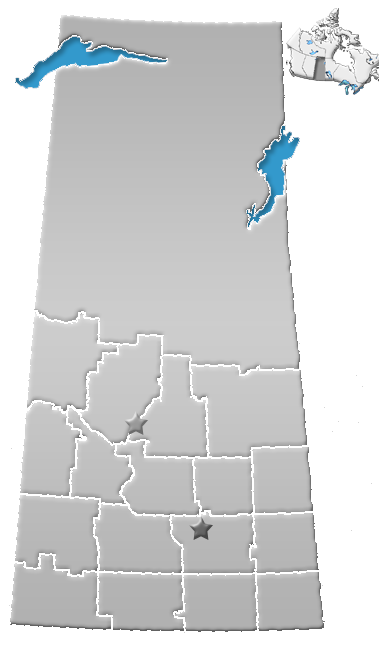
- Category: Census division
- Location: Saskatchewan
- Number: 18
- Populations: 10,872 (Division No. 4) – 326,109 (Division No. 11)
- Subdivisions: Rural municipality, municipality, unincoroporated community, First Nations community

The province of Saskatchewan, Canada is divided into 18 census divisions according to Statistics Canada. Unlike in some other provinces, census divisions do not reflect the organization of local government in Saskatchewan. These areas exist solely for the purposes of statistical analysis and presentation; they have no government of their own.

Saskatchewan's census divisions consist of numerous census subdivisions which include subdivisions such as:

- Urban municipalities (cities, towns, villages, and resort villages);
- Rural municipalities;
- Northern municipalities (northern towns, northern villages, and northern hamlets); and
- Indian reserves

== List of census divisions ==
Division	Population (2021)	Population (2016)	Change	Land area (km^{2})	Population density	Largest centre	Population (2021)
No. 1	30,351	31,766	−4.5%	14,654	2.1/km^{2}	Estevan	10,629
No. 2	22,497	22,825	−1.4%	16,535	1.4/km^{2}	Weyburn	10,883
No. 3	12,262	12,610	−2.8%	18,319	0.7/km^{2}	Assiniboia	2,333
No. 4	10,872	10,854	+0.2%	21,419	0.5/km^{2}	Maple Creek	2,151
No. 5	31,583	31,750	−0.5%	14,441	2.2/km^{2}	Melville	4,075
No. 6	276,564	262,837	+5.2%	17,363	15.9/km^{2}	Regina	224,996
No. 7	47,413	47,195	+0.5%	18,707	2.5/km^{2}	Moose Jaw	32,813
No. 8	30,840	30,718	+0.4%	22,356	1.4/km^{2}	Swift Current	16,304
No. 9	36,047	35,634	+1.2%	14,851	2.4/km^{2}	Yorkton	15,969
No. 10	16,483	16,563	−0.5%	11,922	1.4/km^{2}	Wynyard	1,667
No. 11	326,109	303,423	+7.5%	16,602	19.6/km^{2}	Saskatoon	264,637
No. 12	23,208	23,986	−3.2%	13,788	1.7/km^{2}	Battleford	3,651
No. 13	22,047	23,224	−5.1%	17,182	1.3/km^{2}	Kindersley	2,938
No. 14	35,428	36,096	−1.9%	33,676	1.1/km^{2}	Melfort	5,718
No. 15	88,988	85,908	+3.6%	19,399	4.6/km^{2}	Prince Albert	36,768
No. 16	37,993	37,999	0.0%	21,607	1.8/km^{2}	North Battleford	13,649
No. 17	47,834	47,900	−0.1%	22,222	2.2/km^{2}	Lloydminster (Note: Lloydminster, with a population of 31,582, is considered a population centre of Alberta.)	5,141
No. 18	35,986	37,064	−2.9%	262,280	0.1/km^{2}	La Ronge	5,317

== See also ==
- Administrative divisions of Canada
- List of communities in Saskatchewan
- List of cities in Saskatchewan
- List of Indian reserves in Saskatchewan
- List of resort villages in Saskatchewan
- List of rural municipalities in Saskatchewan
- List of towns in Saskatchewan
- List of villages in Saskatchewan
