= 2014 Saskatchewan municipal elections =

Elections in Canada

- October 22, 2014

Municipal elections in Saskatchewan were held on October 22, 2014. Voters in the Canadian province of Saskatchewan elected the even-numbered division councillors in all rural municipalities.

== Election date ==
Saskatchewan has held its municipal elections in the current fixed schedule since The Local Government Election Act, 2014. Since then, municipal elections have taken place for even-numbered divisions in rural municipalities in every fourth year beginning in 2014.

== See also ==
- List of municipal elections in Saskatchewan
