= Cynthia Block =

Canadian politician

Her Worship Cynthia Block
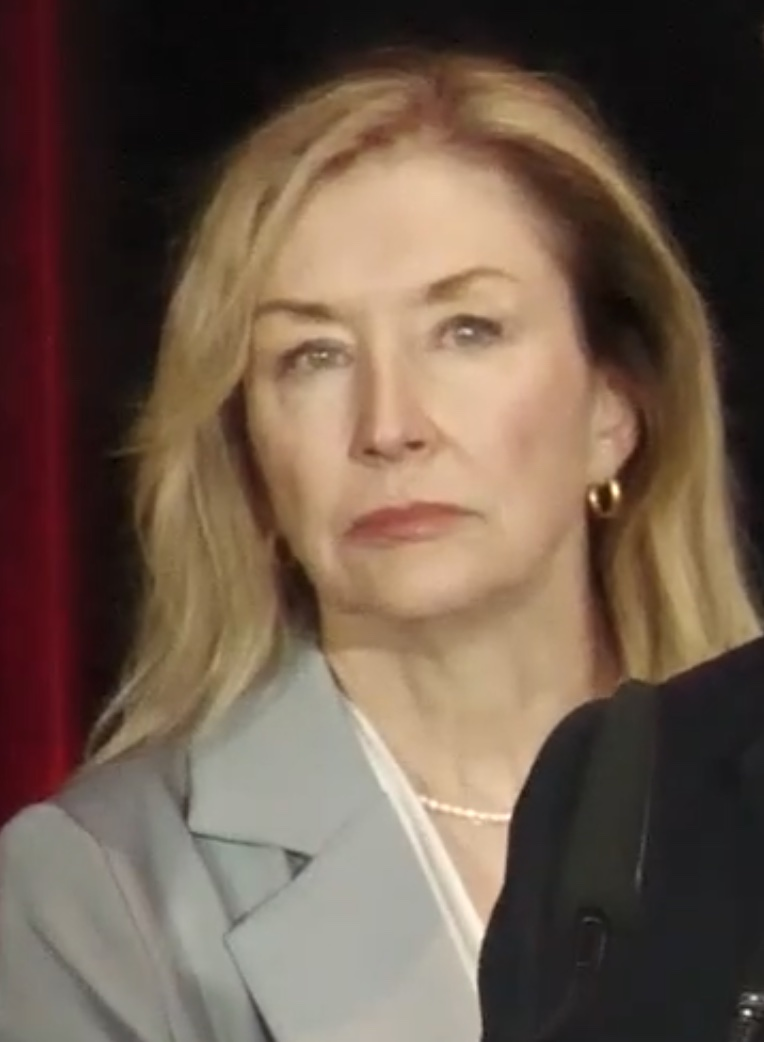

29th Mayor of Saskatoon
- Incumbent
- Assumed office November 20, 2024
- Preceded by: Charlie Clark

Saskatoon City Councillor for Ward 6
- In office 2016–2024
- Preceded by: Charlie Clark
- Succeeded by: Jasmin Parker
- Constituency: Ward 6

Personal details
- Born: Cynthia Marie Block
- Occupation: News anchor
- Profession: Journalism

Cynthia Marie Block is a Canadian politician and the current mayor of Saskatoon, Saskatchewan. Block was elected in the 2024 Saskatchewan municipal elections and is the city's 29th mayor. Block is the first woman to be elected mayor of Saskatoon.

== Before politics ==
Block was raised in rural Saskatchewan, near Blackstrap Lake. Block's father served as reeve of the local rural municipality. Prior to entering politics, Block worked as a journalist and a news anchor for CTV News Saskatoon.

== Political career ==
Block's first political bid came in the 2015 federal election, when she stood for the Liberal Party in the riding of Saskatoon—University. During the campaign, she spoke to the need for more collaborative relationships between governments at the federal and provincial levels. Block finished third in the race.

=== Saskatoon City Council ===
Block was first elected to Saskatoon City Council for Ward 6 in the 2016 municipal election, replacing former councillor Charlie Clark, who vacated the seat as part of a successful bid for mayor. Block was re-elected for Ward 6 in the 2020 municipal election.

Clark, who served two terms as mayor, announced in January 2024 that he would not be seeking a third term. After eight years on city council, Block launched a bid in June 2024 to succeed Clark as mayor. Block was joined in the race by former city councillor and provincial cabinet minister Gordon Wyant, former four-term mayor Don Atchison, former mayoral challenger Cary Tarasoff, and newcomer Mike Harder. Block campaigned on issues she supported as a councillor, such as increasing density in urban development, including through zoning changes and improved public transit, and revitalizing the downtown core of the city. In addition, she argued for the need for Canadian municipalities to partner together and create more "economies of scale" to combat inflationary pressure, including through working directly with the federal government.

=== Mayor of Saskatoon ===
Block was elected mayor on November 13, 2024, receiving approximately 45% of the vote city-wide. The victory made Block the first woman to be elected mayor in Saskatoon's history. Block was inaugurated along with the new city council on November 20, 2024.

In December 2024, Block led the new council in reducing a proposed property tax increase in the 2025 budget from nearly 6% to below 5%. Council also approved an encampment and emergency shelter plan that made millions of dollars in federal funding available to help address homelessness. Heading into 2025, Block identified homelessness as one of the city's top priorities—citing a need to work more closely with other levels of government and committing to the rolling out of a task force on the issue—along with completing the modernization of the city's transit system.

== Electoral results ==
2024 Saskatoon mayoral election
Candidate	Votes	%
Cynthia Block	30,412	44.7
Gordon Wyant	20,259	29.7
Don Atchison	10,460	15.4
Cary Tarasoff	6,386	9.4
Mike Harder	568	0.8
Total	68,085	100.00

2015 Canadian federal election: Saskatoon University
Party	Candidate	Votes	%
Conservative	Brad Trost	18,592	41.52
New Democratic	Claire Card	14,115	31.53
Liberal	Cynthia Block	11,287	25.21
Green	Valerie Harvey	686	1.53
Rhinoceros	Eric Matthew Schalm	93	0.21
Total		44,773	100.00
Source: Elections Canada

== See also ==
- List of mayors of Saskatoon
- Saskatoon City Council
