= Chad Novak =

Canadian politician (born 1976)

Chad Aaron Novak (born c. 1976) is a Regina, Saskatchewan–based accountant and local political activist.

== Personal and professional life ==
Novak was born and raised in Moose Jaw and moved to Regina in 2001. He became a certified management accountant in 2004, later working as an income tax auditor for the Canada Revenue Agency. At the time of his 2012 mayoral bid, he was married and working as an accountant at SaskTel.

Novak is an automobile enthusiast and has occasionally appeared in local media in connection with this hobby. In May 2009, he found his brand-new Pontiac Solstice broken into and covered in about a pint of blood. Despite repeated calls by Novak, who said he felt "personally violated", the Regina Police Service declined to send an officer to investigate. Novak publicly criticized the decision and said it made him feel unsafe in the city.

In 2012 he organized a free two-day motor show in Regina, which was intended to be the kick-off event for a promotions company called Prairie Soul Productions. Novak had hoped to secure $50,000 in funding for the company by applying to be a contestant on the reality show Dragons' Den.

== Political candidacies ==
=== 2012 Saskatchewan municipal elections ===
On March 5, 2012, Novak announced his candidacy for the mayoralty of Regina at an outdoor news conference, staging a dramatic entrance from his sports car. Among his campaign promises were a new football stadium, improved city infrastructure, more affordable housing, and increased transparency of city hall through the use of social media. Another key priority of his was provision of a motorsport facility for the city's car enthusiasts.

Despite early promises that his campaign would not involve "throwing dirt", Novak made several highly publicized and controversial attacks against the city administration. An early target of his was Mark Rathwell, then the executive assistant to incumbent mayor Pat Fiacco (who was not seeking re-election). On May 11, Novak convened a press conference to accuse Rathwell of making threats on his life, for which activity Novak was seeking a restraining order. Rathwell denied intimidating or threatening Novak, and Novak's bid for a restraining order was unsuccessful. On October 4, Novak raised the possibility of an "ethics" violation at city hall, claiming that mayor Fiacco was actually the son-in-law of former mayor Larry Schneider. The Fiacco and Schneider families both denied that Fiacco was related to Schneider.

Novak's campaign was also particularly noted for his use of social media. His online attacks elicited an unusually high volume of angry and hostile replies from the electorate, and in one case from the incumbent mayor. At least fifty impostor Twitter accounts sprang up to mock or discredit Novak's campaign, and his real Twitter account was suspended several times after other users flagged it for spamming. Novak suspected the city administration to have engineered the parody accounts and spam reports; Mark Rathwell denied any involvement.

On July 12, Novak withdrew his candidacy, citing personal stress and "dirty" attacks by his opponents that had weakened his campaign. The fake Twitter accounts were specifically mentioned as a factor in Novak's decision to bow out. However, on September 7 he rejoined the race; for fear of being stalked by city hall staff, he made the announcement from a secret location via live Internet feed. Novak said he was resuming his candidacy due to a lack of other suitable candidates, and later revealed that he had approached other candidates, asking them to withdraw their candidacies and support him instead.

The October 24 election was ultimately won by Michael Fougere. Novak placed sixth of nine candidates, receiving 413 of 51,103 votes (0.8%). His total campaign spending was $130, compared to Fougere's $61,614.

=== 2016 Saskatchewan municipal elections ===
In June 2016, Novak floated the idea of running for a seat on the Regina City Council in the 2016 municipal elections. His campaign for Ward 4 was officially announced on his election blog on September 14. Novak was adamant that his 2016 campaign would not see any of the online acrimony that marred his earlier mayoral candidacy, and would instead focus on the issue of taxes. Nonetheless, during the campaign he publicly accused fellow Ward 4 candidate Lori Bresciani of sexism. In a Facebook post, Bresciani had written that the city's handling of daycare property taxation would have been different had there been more women on City Council. Novak characterized this as sexism against men, interpreting Bresciani's comments as implying that men lack the compassion for daycares.

The Ward 4 election was ultimately won by Bresciani; Novak received 6.66% of the votes, putting him in last place.

== Other political activities ==
Novak has involved himself in local political activism as far back as 2007, when he spoke out against the imminent closure of École Ross School in Moose Jaw and presented a financial plan to save the school. However, Novak's plan was not accepted and the school closed in June of that year.

Novak continued his activism after his unsuccessful bid for Regina mayor, regularly speaking at Regina City Council meetings as a private citizen or on behalf of his own "Saskatchewan Taxpayers Advocacy Group". In 2012 he spoke out against the city's plans to build New Mosaic Stadium, and in January 2013 he held a demonstration against the new stadium outside city hall. On one occasion in 2012, city commissionaires ejected him from council chambers for deviating from the pre-approved version of his speech on the stadium.

On January 27, 2014, Novak once again disrupted a city council meeting, this time by shouting from the visitors' gallery and using a gestural obscenity to heckle a city councillor. Mayor Michael Fougere moved to expel Novak, and when the latter refused to leave, he was escorted from the building by the police. This was the latest in a series of incidents that led city hall to upgrade its security system in March 2014.

== In popular culture ==
Novak is the subject of "Chad in the Bright Orange Solstice", a 2012 rock song and music video by Karl Schubach of Misery Signals. The song, which is set to the tune of Trooper's 1979 hit single "The Boys in the Bright White Sportscar", lampoons Novak's mayoral aspirations, referencing his flashy campaign launch, his feud with Pat Fiacco, and his online presence. The accompanying video portrays Novak (played by Schubach) cruising around Regina in his Pontiac Solstice, giving a campaign speech to an auditorium full of stuffed animals, and failing to log into his suspended Twitter account. Released online only a day before the election, the video was received in good humour by Novak himself.
