= 2018 Armenian presidential election =

Presidential election in Armenia

- 2 March 2018

105 voters: All deputies of the National Assembly 79 votes needed to win
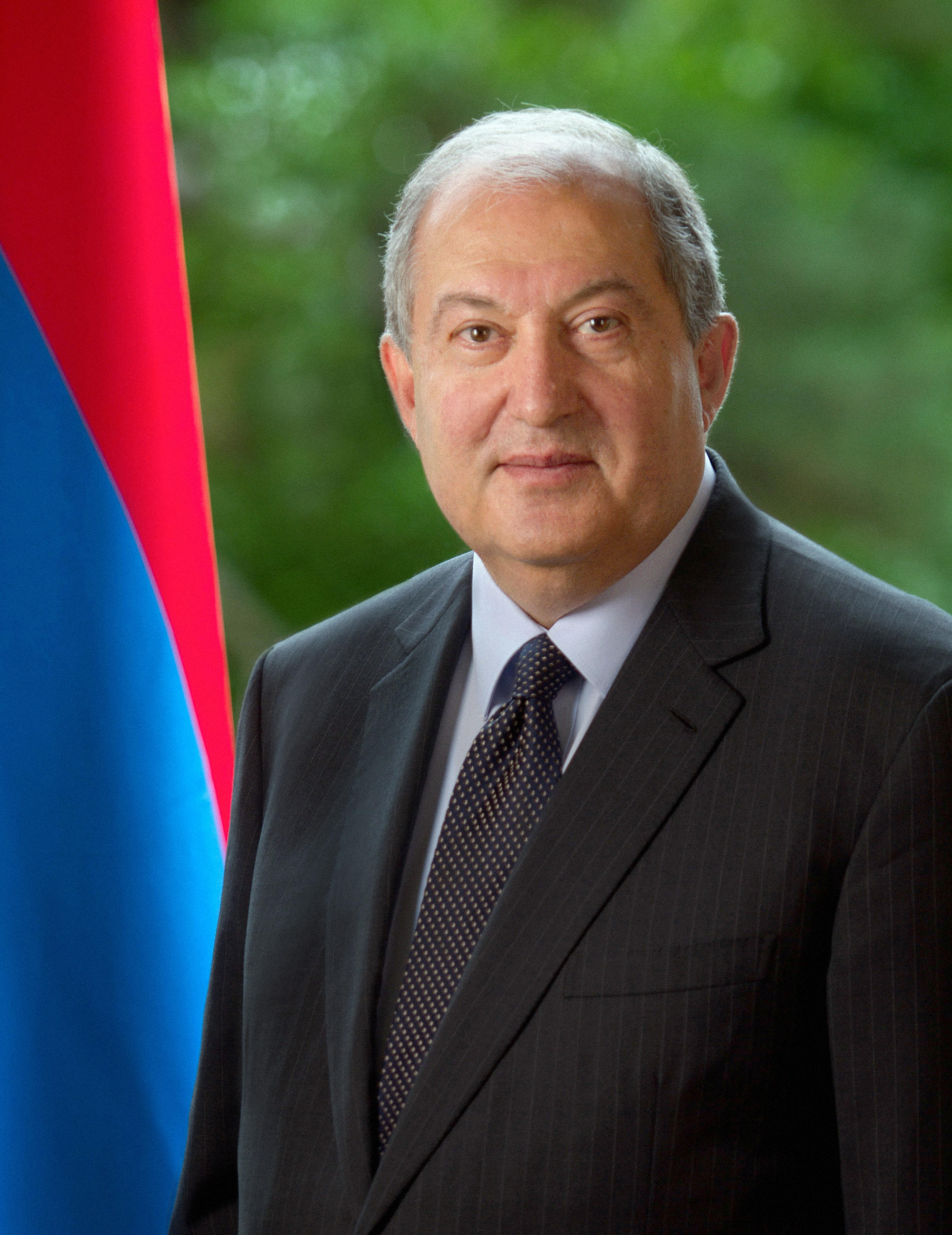
Candidate	Armen Sarkissian
Party	Independent
Electoral vote	90
Percentage	90.0%
Nominators	Republican Party of Armenia, Armenian Revolutionary Federation
President before election
Serzh Sargsyan
Republican
Elected President
Armen Sarkissian
Independent

Presidential elections were held in Armenia on 2 March 2018. As a result of the 2015 Armenian constitutional referendum, this was the first time in Armenia's history when the president was elected by the National Assembly instead of popular vote. Another outcome of the referendum was that the newly elected president will perform a ceremonial role as the country is currently transitioning from a semi-presidential system to a parliamentary republic. Incumbent president Serzh Sargsyan was barred by the Constitution of Armenia from running for a third consecutive term. Armen Sarkissian ran unopposed due to no other party nominating a candidate and easily won the election in the first round with 90 electoral votes.

== Background ==
In accordance with Article 124 of the amended constitution, a non-partisan president will be elected for a seven-year, non-renewable term. In accordance with Article 125, the candidate that receives at least three fourths of votes of the total number of deputies of the National Assembly will be elected President of Armenia. If the president is not elected, a second round is held wherein all candidates who took part in the first round may participate. In the second round, the candidate that receives at least three fifths of votes of the total number of deputies will be elected as president. If a president is still not elected, a third round of elections will be held wherein the two candidates who received a greater number of votes in the second round may participate. In the third round, the candidate who receives the majority of votes of the total number of deputies will be elected.

According to Article 125 of the constitution, at least one fourth of the total number of deputies of the National Assembly shall have the right to nominate a candidate for president. This means that at least 27 members of parliament must back the respective candidate in order for that candidate to be officially nominated. Thus, in the case of a wide consensus, a candidate may very well run unopposed since minority parties with less than 27 members in the National Assembly will not be able to nominate a candidate.

== Eligibility ==
According to the amended constitution, everyone who has reached the age of forty, held citizenship of only Armenia for the preceding six years and permanently resided in Armenia for the preceding six years, has the right of suffrage, and speaks the Armenian language may be elected as president.

== Candidates ==
President Serzh Sargsyan on 18 January recommended the candidacy of Armen Sarkissian, the former Armenian ambassador to the United Kingdom, for president to be supported by the ruling Republican Party. Sargsyan stressed the necessity for the presidential candidate to have wide support in the National Assembly when elected. On 16 February, Armen Sarkissian officially accepted Sargsyan's offer to become the Republican Party's candidate for president.

The ruling coalition, which consisted of the Republican Party and the Armenian Revolutionary Federation, officially nominated Armen Sarkissian for president on 23 February. On 24 February, the Prosperous Armenia party, which was in opposition, signaled that it would vote for the ruling coalition's candidate. This means that the only party left that did not nominate a candidate was the Way Out Alliance. As a party or coalition must have the support of at least one fourth of the deputies in the National Assembly, the Way Out Alliance were not able to nominate a candidate as they only had nine deputies in the National Assembly. Sarkissian took up office on 9 April 2018.

Candidates
Candidates are nominated by political parties in the National Assembly.
All candidates must be non-partisan.

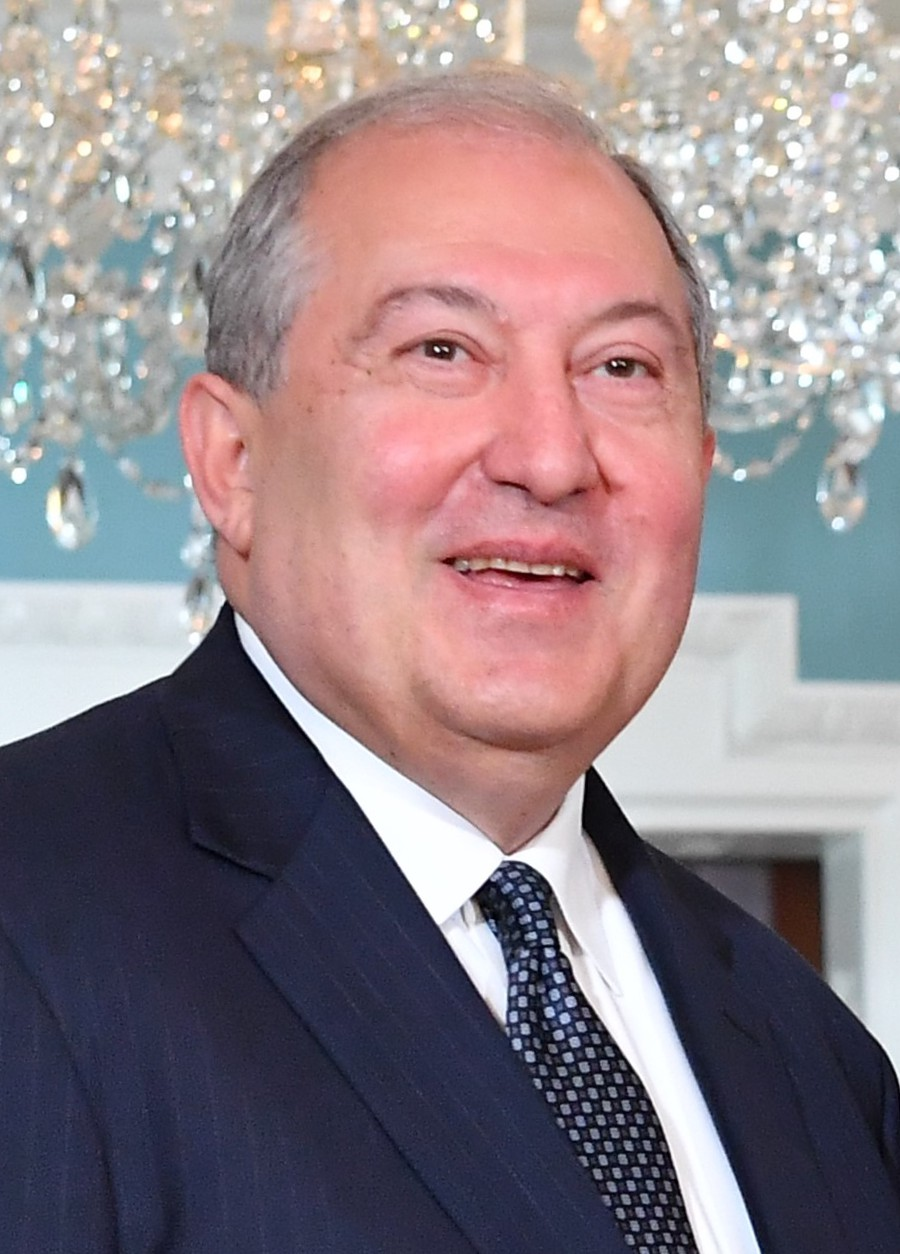
Armen Sarkissian
Supported by: Republican Party of Armenia, Armenian Revolutionary Federation, Prosperous Armenia
Ambassador of Armenia to the United Kingdom

== Results ==
Candidate	Party	Votes	%
Armen Sarkissian	Independent	90	90.00
Against		10	10.00
Total		100	100.00
Valid votes		100	99.01
Invalid/blank votes		1	0.99
Total votes		101	100.00
Registered voters/turnout		105	96.19
Source: Tert.am

== See also ==
- Politics of Armenia
- Programs of political parties in Armenia
- 2018 Armenian parliamentary election
