= Don Atchison =

Canadian businessman and mayor (born 1952)

Mayor of Saskatoon
- In office October 22, 2003 – October 26, 2016
- Preceded by: Jim Maddin
- Succeeded by: Charlie Clark

Saskatoon City Councillor
- In office 1994–2003
- Preceded by: Ward created
- Succeeded by: Bev Dubois
- Constituency: Ward 10

Personal details
- Born: March 1, 1952 (age 74) Saskatoon, Saskatchewan, Canada
- Occupation: Business owner

Donald James Atchison SOM (born March 1, 1952) is a Canadian politician who was Mayor of Saskatoon, the largest city in the central Canadian province of Saskatchewan, from 2003 to 2016. Atchison was elected mayor four times, tied for the most after mayoral terms were extended beyond one year in 1954. When he lost his bid for a fifth term in 2016, he left office as the longest-serving mayor in the city's history at 13 years.

== Early life ==
Atchison was born and raised in Saskatoon, where he attended Queen Elizabeth and Holliston Elementary School, Walter Murray Collegiate, and the University of Saskatchewan. He developed an early interest in politics and joined his high school student council in grade 12; running for the position of sports representative, he campaigned by wearing sports equipment to class daily. He was a standout ice hockey goaltender from an early age, and he played junior hockey for the Saskatoon Blades in the 1971–72 season. In 1972, Atchison was drafted by the NHL's Pittsburgh Penguins. Although he did not ultimately play in the NHL, Atchison had a brief professional career in the United States before returning to Saskatoon and joining the family business, the men's wear store Atch & Co. He was offered a role in the 1977 hockey film Slap Shot, but turned the opportunity down, thinking it was a joke.

== Political career ==
=== Saskatoon city councillor ===
Atchison was first elected to Saskatoon's city council in 1994 as councillor for the newly created Ward 10, and was re-elected in 1997 and acclaimed in 2000. He was well known for his campaigning style of standing on street corners and waving at passing motorists, a tactic that was eventually outlawed. He sought initially to bring a business perspective to city government. In 1996, he brought forward a heavily derided proposal from local consultant Henry Feldkamp to enclose much of downtown Saskatoon in an $80 million, 10-storey climate-controlled glass atrium dubbed the "Atreos."

=== Mayor of Saskatoon ===
Atchison was first elected as mayor on October 22, 2003 in a close four-way contest, unseating incumbent Jim Maddin. He became just the second Saskatoon mayor to have been born in the city. Atchison ran on a platform that included being tough on crime, freezing property taxes, centralizing control of city management, and resuming control of the city's police commission. After his election as mayor, he briefly required citizens visiting the Mayor's office to be formally dressed, but the policy was dropped after being widely criticized and noted as a potential conflict of interest, given Atchison's involvement with the family men's wear store. The policy was targeted by comedian Rick Mercer, who sponsored an online contest in 2004 that went on to name Atchison "Canada's Craziest Mayor," a title he jokingly embraced.

Atchison oversaw a period of rapid economic growth, emphasizing the development of new neighbourhoods, infrastructure, and the renewal of the River Landing development adjacent to downtown. He was re-elected by wide margins in 2006 and 2009, before earning a narrow bid for a fourth term in 2012 against political newcomer Tom Wolf. In the 2012 election, Wolf targeted perceived mismanagement at City Hall, a lack of consultation with the public, and Atchison's reputation for boosterism, and won a majority of votes in all of the city's core neighbourhoods. Atchison was re-elected on a strong performance in suburban neighbourhoods. As term limits for Saskatchewan municipal councils were extended at this time to four years, Atchison's fourth term would make him the longest serving mayor in the city's history.

Atchison was known as a mayor who attended events prolifically, but by 2012 he also began drawing heavy criticism for never having attended a local pride parade, despite annual invitations from organizers. In 2015, hundreds of people circulated a letter criticizing Atchison's continued absence, though in 2016 Atchison continued to claim that his absences were merely due to scheduling conflicts.

In 2016 Atchison launched a bid for what would have been a record-setting fifth term as mayor. He was ultimately defeated by former city councillor Charlie Clark, who ran against Atchison on a platform focused on inclusiveness and planning for future growth.

=== Comeback attempts ===
After the 2016 election, Atchison worked as a consultant for Canwest Commercial and Land Corporation on the development of a World Trade Center in downtown Saskatoon. In 2020, he launched a comeback bid for the mayor's chair, challenging the incumbent Clark and former provincial cabinet minister Rob Norris. In the context of the COVID-19 pandemic, Atchison positioned himself as an experienced leader best-positioned to guide the city's economic recovery. He renewed his early-career promise to freeze property taxes and criticized recently adopted initiatives including a new rapid-transit system and a new central library project. He ultimately finished third in the race behind Norris and Clark, who was re-elected to a second term. In the summer of 2023, it was reported that Atchison had expressed interest in running once again in 2024, stating that he would "love to be the mayor" again, while targeting municipal spending as a key campaign issue. In August 2024, he officially announced another bid for mayor; with Clark deciding not to run for a third term, Atchison was joined in the race by two-term councillor Cynthia Block and former provincial cabinet minister Gordon Wyant. As in 2020, Atchison finished in third place, with Block winning the election.

== Personal life ==
Atchison and his wife Mardele have five children and thirteen grandchildren. He has maintained an interest and involvement in a variety of sports including curling, tennis, football, golf, and hockey, as both a player and a coach. Atchison is a member of the Saskatchewan Grand Lodge of Freemasons. He was appointed to the Saskatchewan Order of Merit in 2019.

== Controversies ==
In 2022 Atchison was named as one of at least three local politicians for whom students at Legacy Christian Academy school (then Christian Centre Academy) were coerced into campaigning for. Although Atchison was not a member of the affiliated Saskatoon Christian Centre church, it has been alleged that he had a close relationship with the church's director, Keith Johnson, who has been named in a class action lawsuit by former student's seeking redress for allegations of child abuse. Former students have alleged that they were also required to purchase two pairs of pants each year from Atchison's men's wear store.

== Election results ==
2024 Saskatoon mayoral election
| Candidate | Votes | % |
|---|---|---|
| Cynthia Block | 30,412 | 44.7 |
| Gordon Wyant | 20,259 | 29.7 |
| Don Atchison | 10,460 | 15.4 |
| Cary Tarasoff | 6,386 | 9.4 |
| Mike Harder | 568 | 0.8 |
| Total | 68,085 | 100.00 |

2020 Saskatoon mayoral election
| Candidate | Votes | % |
|---|---|---|
| Charlie Clark | 27,377 | 46.9 |
| Rob Norris | 15,261 | 26.1 |
| Don Atchison | 11,722 | 20.1 |
| Cary Tarasoff | 2,650 | 4.5 |
| 2 other candidates | 1,360 | 2.3 |
| Total | 58,370 | 100.00 |

2016 Saskatoon mayoral election
| Candidate | Votes | % |
|---|---|---|
| Charlie Clark | 32,565 | 40.7 |
| Don Atchison | 29,518 | 36.9 |
| Kelley Moore | 17,381 | 21.7 |
| Devon Hein | 548 | 0.06 |
| Total | 80,012 | 100.00 |

2012 Saskatoon mayoral election
| Candidate | Votes | % |
|---|---|---|
| Don Atchison | 34,489 | 52.1 |
| Tom Wolf | 31,085 | 47 |
| Clay Mazurkewich | 605 | 0.9 |
| Total | 66,179 | 100.00 |

2009 Saskatoon mayoral election
| Candidate | Votes | % |
|---|---|---|
| Don Atchison | 26,676 | 57.7 |
| Lenore Swystun | 17,678 | 38.3 |
| 3 other candidates | 1,852 | 4 |
| Total | 46,206 | 100.00 |

2006 Saskatoon mayoral election
| Candidate | Votes | % |
|---|---|---|
| Don Atchison | 38,378 | 63.9 |
| Lenore Swystun | 13,539 | 22.5 |
| Jim Maddin | 5,610 | 9.3 |
| Ron Kocsis | 1,193 | 2.1 |
| 3 other candidates | 1,346 | 2.2 |
| Total | 60,066 | 100.00 |

2003 Saskatoon mayoral election
| Candidate | Votes | % |
|---|---|---|
| Don Atchison | 24,670 | 30.3 |
| Peter Zakreski | 20,760 | 25.5 |
| Jim Pankiw | 18,432 | 22.7 |
| Jim Maddin | 15,448 | 19 |
| 2 other candidates | 2,041 | 2.5 |
| Total | 81,351 | 100.00 |

== See also ==
- List of mayors of Saskatoon
