= Charlie Clark (politician) =

Canadian politician

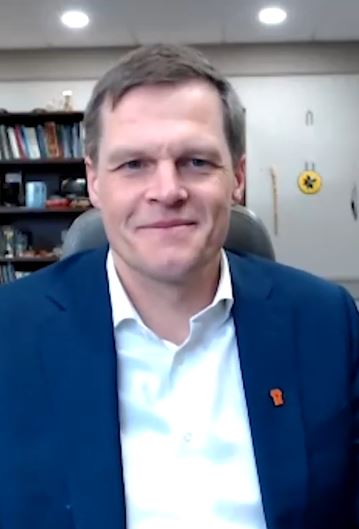
- Clark in 2023

28th Mayor of Saskatoon
- In office October 31, 2016 – November 20, 2024
- Preceded by: Don Atchison
- Succeeded by: Cynthia Block

Saskatoon City Councillor for Ward 6
- In office 2006–2016
- Preceded by: Elaine Hnatyshyn
- Succeeded by: Cynthia Block
- Constituency: Ward 6

Personal details
- Spouse: Sarah Buhler
- Education: York University (M.A.); University of Toronto (B.Ed.); University of Winnipeg (B.A.)
- Occupation: Educator and Mediator

Charlie Clark is a Canadian politician who served as the 28th mayor of Saskatoon for two terms from 2016 to 2024. Clark's two terms in office focused on improved urban planning, sustainability, and reconciliation.

== Early life ==
Clark grew up in British Columbia and studied in both Toronto and Winnipeg. He earned bachelor's degrees in conflict resolution and education and a master's degree in environmental studies. Clark worked in mediation, restorative justice, adult education, and community economic development. He moved to Saskatoon in 2002 and worked for local non-profit community development organizations including the Core Neighbourhood Development Council and Quint Development Corporation. He has stated that he nearly became a teacher before getting involved in municipal politics.

== Political career ==
=== Saskatoon City Council ===
Clark was first elected to Saskatoon City Council in 2006, unseating incumbent Elaine Hnatyshyn. He was acclaimed in 2009 and re-elected by a wide margin in 2012. As a councillor, Clark often championed greater transparency and alternative development strategies. He voted to ban corporate, union, and out-of-province campaign contributions in motions that were ultimately defeated, advocated for better waste management and transportation policies, and against new mega-projects.

=== Mayor of Saskatoon ===
After 10 years as a councillor, Clark launched a bid for mayor in 2016, challenging four-term incumbent Don Atchison, who was again seeking re-election. Clark ran on a platform of better planning for future growth, including economic and environmental sustainability, as well as more focus on issues of social justice and inclusiveness. The 2016 election became a tight three-way race when another challenger, Kelley Moore, declared her candidacy. Clark's campaign was buoyed by a team of more than 800 volunteers and several high-profile endorsements, including from actor Zach Galifianakis, to whom Clark is related. Despite trailing in the polls late in the campaign, Clark was elected mayor, defeating Atchison by a margin of over 3,000 votes.

During his first term, Clark oversaw the development of new community partnerships focused on economic and social development, public safety and harm reduction, and sustainability. He championed initiatives like the Safe Community Action Alliance, the city's Low Emissions Community Plan, a new rapid-transit system, and active transportation infrastructure. His long-time support for protected bicycle lanes led to opponents labelling Clark "Bike Lane Charlie." He also drew a sharp contrast with former mayor Atchison, who never attended a pride parade during his 13-year tenure as mayor, when he grand-marshaled the 2017 pride parade.

Clark ran for a second term as mayor in 2020 amidst the COVID-19 pandemic. He ran on a platform of economic recovery, inclusive growth, and addressing the root causes of crime. He was challenged by former provincial MLA and cabinet minister Rob Norris, who was accused of organizing a slate of candidates in the election—a charge Norris denied. Atchison also entered the race in a bid to reclaim the mayor's chair. The date of the election was initially moved by the provincial government so as not to conflict with the 2020 provincial election, and was then postponed by a severe blizzard. Clark was ultimately re-elected to his second term by a wide margin.

Clark's second term saw a continued focus on sustainable and long-term growth, with the city implementing a corridor strategy aimed at limiting continual sprawl and increasing density in the city. Clark's council increased its focus on homelessness in the city, advocating to better coordinate federal and provincial funding and pursuing a decentralization of services within the city. In 2023, Clark stated that moving ahead with a number of major projects would be a priority, including a continuation of downtown revitalization efforts through planning for a new downtown entertainment district, and waste diversion initiatives.

Clark's two terms were marked by economic challenges, including the pandemic and significant cuts to provincial funding beginning in 2017. Despite those challenges, property tax increases were on average lower during Clark's tenure than the preceding thirteen years.

On January 24, 2024, Clark announced that he would not seek a third term as mayor. He stated that he was most proud of helping to build relationships throughout the community and changing the city's reputation as one that tended to lose its young professionals. Moreover, Clark praised City Council for working together as a team despite perceptions of a divide between progressive and conservative factions; at his final council meeting, councillors that routinely voted in opposition to Clark praised his integrity and leadership. The decision to leave office made Clark the first Saskatoon mayor since Cliff Wright in 1988 to do so without losing an election. Clark was ultimately succeeded by Cynthia Block, the same person who had succeeded him as Ward 6 city councillor in 2016.

== Controversies ==
In April 2021, a security guard at a local grocery store was recorded while arresting an Indigenous woman for stealing, an interaction in which the guard applied force to restrain and arrest the woman. At the time, Clark released a statement saying that "not everyone would have been treated this way". After a judge ruled in 2023 that the security guard had acted within his rights, the crown prosecutor criticized Clark and Federation of Sovereign Indigenous Nations Chief Bobby Cameron—who had also spoke out about the incident—for releasing statements about a matter that was before the court.

== Personal life ==
Clark is married to Sarah Buhler, a law professor at the University of Saskatchewan. They have three children. When Clark announced that he would not be seeking a third term as mayor, he cited a desire to spend time as a parent with children at home while not also being a public figure.

After leaving the mayor's office, Clark took up a position as Treaty Relations Lead with the Office of the Treaty Commissioner.

== Electoral results ==
2020 Saskatoon mayoral election
Candidate	Votes	%
Charlie Clark	27,377	46.9
Rob Norris	15,261	26.1
Don Atchison	11,722	20.1
Cary Tarasoff	2,650	4.5
2 other candidates	1,360	2.3
Total	58,370	100.00

2016 Saskatoon mayoral election
Candidate	Votes	%
Charlie Clark	32,565	40.7
Don Atchison	29,518	36.9
Kelley Moore	17,381	21.7
Devon Hein	548	0.06
Total	80,012	100.00

== See also ==
- List of mayors of Saskatoon
- Saskatoon City Council
