= Saskatoon City Council =

Elected governing body of Saskatoon, Saskatchewan

Type
- Type: City Council
- Established: 1906

Leadership
- Mayor: Cynthia Block since November 20, 2024

Structure
- Seats: 11 (10 plus Mayor)
- Length of term: 4 years

Elections
- Voting system: FPTP
- Last election: November 13, 2024
- Next election: November 2028

Website
- https://www.saskatoon.ca/city-hall

Saskatoon City Council is the governing body of Saskatoon, the largest city in the Canadian province of Saskatchewan. It consists of ten councillors representing ten wards throughout the city and the mayor of Saskatoon, who is elected city-wide. The current council was elected to a four-year term on November 13, 2024.

== Historical background ==
Saskatoon City Council held its inaugural meeting on June 26, 1906, when the city was inaugurated, growing from what had been the Town Council. Until 1954, the mayor and councillors were elected every year; after that and until 1970, the mayor was elected biannually. After 1970, the mayor and councillors were elected to three year terms, until 2012 when the term was extended to four years.

The format of elections has also changed over time, alternating between ward-based and at-large systems. The former has been in place since 1994, and was also used from 1906-1920, when there were initially four and then five wards with two councillors per ward, and 1973-1988, when there were also ten wards with one councillor per ward.

209 individuals have served as councillors—201 since the city was inaugurated in 1906—and 29 have served as mayor, with 24 mayors having first served as councillors.

== City Council ==
=== Mayor ===
Mayor of Saskatoon
Mayor	First elected	2024	Preceded by	Notes
Cynthia Block	2024	Elected with 44.7% of the vote	Charlie Clark	Before running for mayor, Block served as councillor for Ward 6 for eight years, from 2016 to 2024. Block won the first Saskatoon mayoral race with no incumbent since 1988. She is the first woman to be elected mayor in Saskatoon.

=== Councillors ===
Saskatoon City Councillors by ward
Ward	Councillor	First elected	2024	Preceded by	Notes
1	Kathryn MacDonald	2024	Elected with 32.3% of the vote	Darren Hill	MacDonald defeated five-term incumbent Darren Hill, along with three other challengers, for the Ward 1 seat.
2	Senos Timon	2024	Elected with 31.9% of the vote	Hilary Gough	Timon won an open contest in 2024 and is the first Black person to sit on Saskatoon City Council.
3	Robert Pearce	2024	Elected with 50.3% of the vote	David Kirton	Pearce replaced one-term councillor David Kirton, who opted not to run for re-election.
4	Troy Davies	2012	Re-elected with 62.8% of the vote	Myles Heidt	Davies won a fourth consecutive term in 2024.
5	Randy Donauer	2010^{[a]}	Re-elected with 47.5% of the vote	Gordon Wyant	Donauer won a fourth consecutive full term in 2024; he was first elected in a 2010 by-election.
6	Jasmin Parker	2024	Elected with 40.0% of the vote	Cynthia Block	Parker was elected to succeed new mayor Cynthia Block, who represented Ward 6 from 2016 to 2024.
7	Holly Kelleher	2024	Elected with 39.8% of the vote	Mairin Loewen	Kelleher won an open contest to replace longtime councillor Mairin Loewen.
8	Scott Ford	2024	Elected with 26.5% of the vote	Sarina Gersher	Ford won the largest race in 2024, facing seven other challengers for the open Ward 8 seat.
9	Bev Dubois	2016	Acclaimed	Tiffany Paulsen	Dubois represented Ward 10 from 2003 to 2012, when she was unseated by current Ward 10 councillor Jeffries.
10	Zach Jeffries	2012	Acclaimed	Bev Dubois	In 2012, Jeffries became the youngest person elected to City Council at age 26.

==== Notes ====
- ^{a} Councillor was elected in a by-election.

== See also ==
- List of mayors of Saskatoon
- 2024 Saskatchewan municipal elections
