= List of cities in Saskatchewan =

In the Canadian province of Saskatchewan, a city is a type of incorporated urban municipality that is created from a town by the minister of municipal affairs. The city form of governmental organization is created by a ministerial order via section 39 of The Cities Act if the town has a population of 5,000 or more and if the change in status is requested by the town council.

In the early history of the province, the threshold for city status was much lower, with both Saskatoon and Regina achieving city status with populations in the 3,000 range. One city, Melville, currently has a population well below the current 5,000 threshold, but retains its city status even though the population criterion has changed since its current governmental form was designated.

Saskatchewan has 16 cities including Lloydminster, which traverses the provincial border with Alberta, but does not include Flin Flon, which traverses the provincial border with Manitoba. With the exception of Flin Flon, Saskatchewan's other cities had a cumulative population of 595,707 and an average population of 37,232 in the 2011 Census. Saskatchewan's largest and smallest cities are Saskatoon and Melville with populations of 246,376 and 4,562 respectively.

== List ==
Name	Rural municipality	Year founded	Incorporation date			Population			Land area		Population density	
Name	Rural municipality	Year founded	(village)	(town)	(city)	(2021)	(2016)	Change (%)	(km^{2})	(sq mi)	(/km^{2})	(/sq mi)
Estevan	Estevan No. 5	1892	November 2, 1899	March 1, 1906	March 1, 1957	10,851	11,483	−5.5%	18.30	7.07	593.0	1,536
Flin Flon (part) (Note: The balance of Flin Flon is located within Manitoba.)	— (Note: The Saskatchewan portion of Flin Flon is surrounded by the unorganized Northern Saskatchewan Administration District.)	—	–	April 4, 1952 (Note: While the Saskatchewan portion of Flin Flon does not have a formal incorporation date, it was the passing of The Flin Flon Extensions of Boundaries Act, 1952, when the portion of Flin Flon in Manitoba held town status, that enabled a single municipal jurisdiction for the Manitoba and Saskatchewan portions of Flin Flon.)	—	159 (Note: This population does not include 4,940 in the Manitoba portion of Flin Flon. The city's total population in 2021 was 5,099.)	203	−21.7%	2.01 (Note: This area does not include 13.14 km^{2} (5.07 mi^{2}) in the Manitoba portion of Flin Flon. The city's total area in 2021 was 15.15 km^{2} (5.85 mi^{2}).)	0.78	79.1	205
Humboldt	Humboldt No. 370	1875	June 30, 1905	April 1, 1907	November 7, 2000	6,033	5,869	+2.8%	13.30	5.14	453.6	1,175
Lloydminster (part) (Note: The balance of Lloydminster is located within Alberta.)	Britannia No. 502; Wilton No. 472	1903	November 25, 1903	April 1, 1907	January 1, 1958	11,843 (Note: This population does not include 19,739 in the Alberta portion of Lloydminster. The city's total population in 2021 was 31,582.)	11,765	+0.7%	18.06 (Note: This area does not include 23.98 km^{2} (9.26 mi^{2}) in the Alberta portion of Lloydminster. The city's total area in 2021 was 42.04 km^{2} (16.23 mi^{2}).)	6.97	655.8	1,699
Martensville (Note: Martensville is Saskatchewan's smallest city by area.)	Corman Park No. 344	1939	September 1, 1966	January 1, 1969	November 3, 2009	10,549	9,655	+9.3%	13.56	5.24	777.9	2,015
Meadow Lake	Meadow Lake No. 588	1889	August 24, 1931	February 1, 1936	November 9, 2009	5,322	5,344	−0.4%	12.37	4.78	430.2	1,114
Melfort	Star City No. 428	1884	November 4, 1903	July 1, 1907	September 2, 1980	5,955	5,992	−0.6%	14.73	5.69	404.3	1,047
Melville (Note: Melville is Saskatchewan's smallest city by population.)	Cana No. 214	1908	December 21, 1908	November 1, 1909	August 1, 1960	4,493	4,562	−1.5%	14.78	5.71	304.0	787
Moose Jaw	Moose Jaw No. 161	1881	—	January 19, 1884	November 20, 1903	33,665	33,910	−0.7%	65.81	25.41	511.5	1,325
North Battleford	North Battleford No. 437	1903	March 21, 1906	July 18, 1906	May 1, 1913	13,836	14,315	−3.3%	33.55	12.95	412.4	1,068
Prince Albert	Prince Albert No. 461	1866	—	October 8, 1885	October 8, 1904	37,756	35,926	+5.1%	67.17	25.93	562.1	1,456
Regina (Note: Regina is Saskatchewan's capital and was its first city, incorporated June 19, 1903. The Regina census metropolitan area (CMA) is formed around the City of Regina.)	Sherwood No. 159	1882	—	December 1, 1883	June 19, 1903	226,404	215,106	+5.3%	178.81	69.04	1,266.2	3,279
Saskatoon (Note: Saskatoon is Saskatchewan's largest city by both population and area. The Saskatoon CMA includes the cities of Martensville and Saskatoon.)	Corman Park No. 344	1883	November 16, 1901	July 1, 1903	May 26, 1906	266,141	247,201	+7.7%	226.56	87.48	1,174.7	3,042
Swift Current	Swift Current No. 137	1882	February 4, 1904	March 15, 1907	January 15, 1914	16,750	16,604	+0.9%	29.30	11.31	571.7	1,481
Warman (Note: Warman is Saskatchewan's newest city, incorporated October 27, 2012.)	Corman Park No. 344	1904	May 15, 1905	May 19, 1905	October 27, 2012	12,419	11,020	+12.7%	13.10	5.06	948.0	2,455
Weyburn	Weyburn No. 67	1899	October 22, 1900	August 5, 1903	September 1, 1913	11,019	10,870	+1.4%	19.03	7.35	579.0	1,500
Yorkton	Orkney No. 244	1882	July 11, 1894	April 16, 1900	February 1, 1928	16,280	16,343	−0.4%	36.19	13.97	449.8	1,165
Total cities	—	—	—	—	—	689,475	656,168	+5.1%	776.63	299.86	887.8	2,299

== Gallery ==
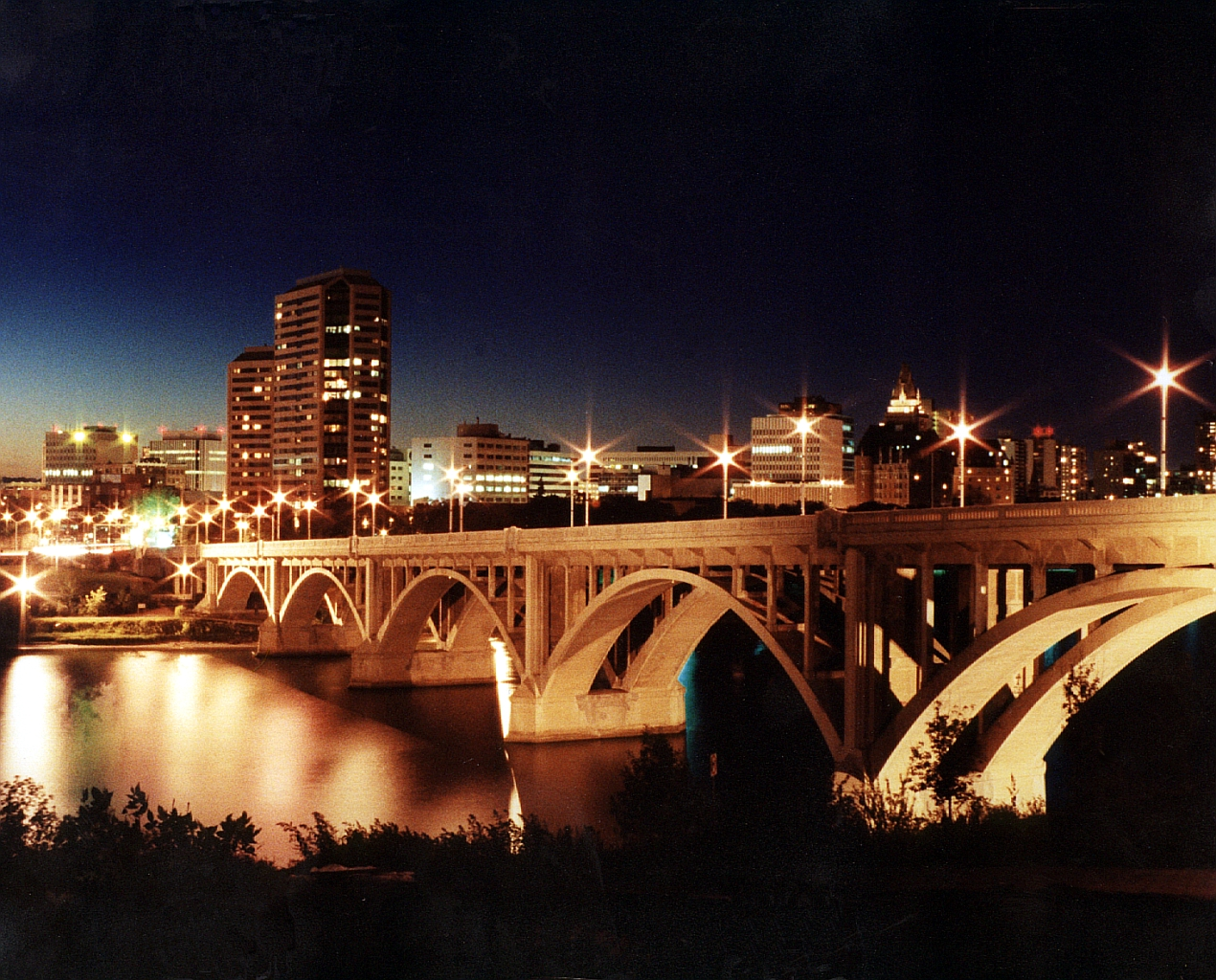
Saskatoon is Saskatchewan's largest city

Regina is Saskatchewan's capital and second-largest city

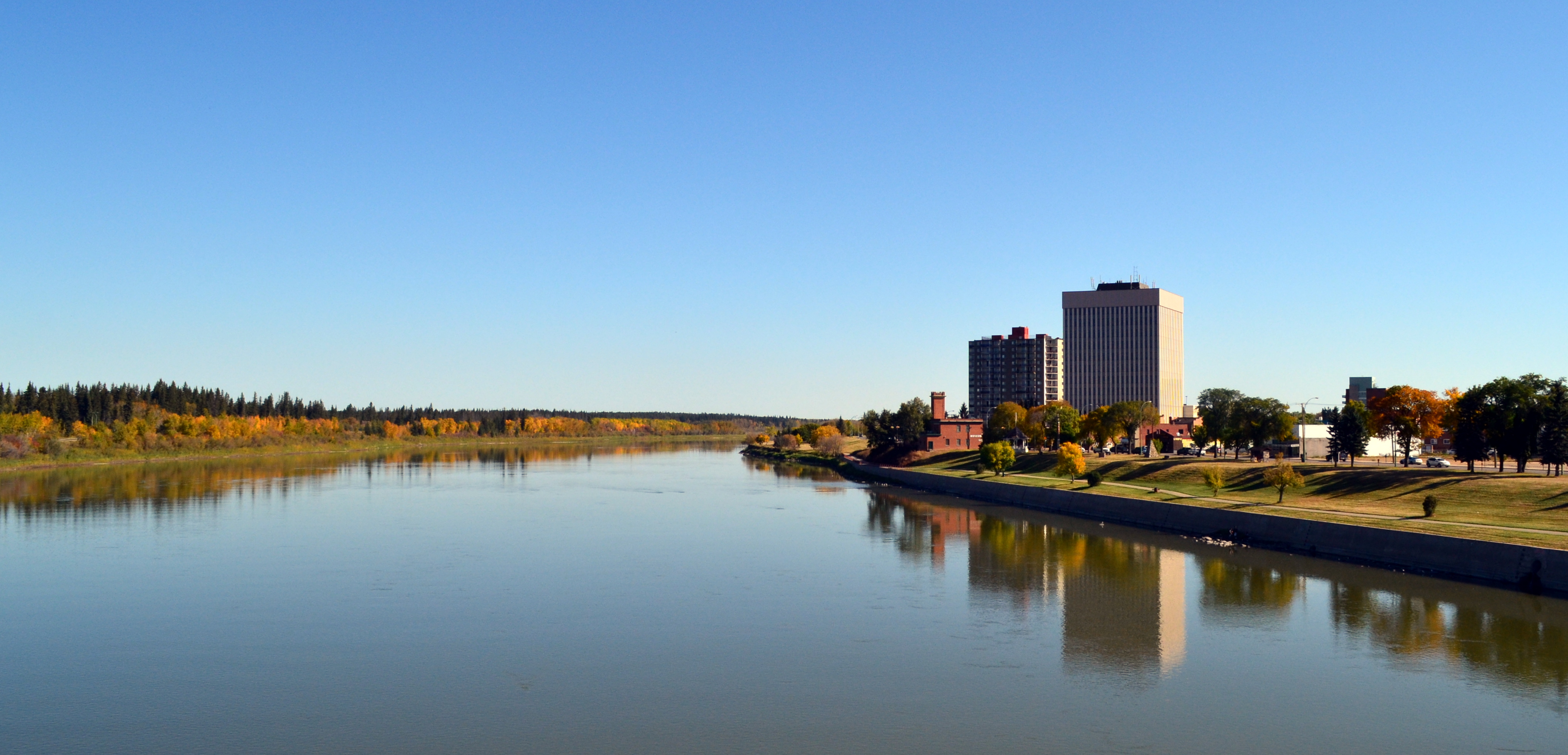
Skyline of Prince Albert

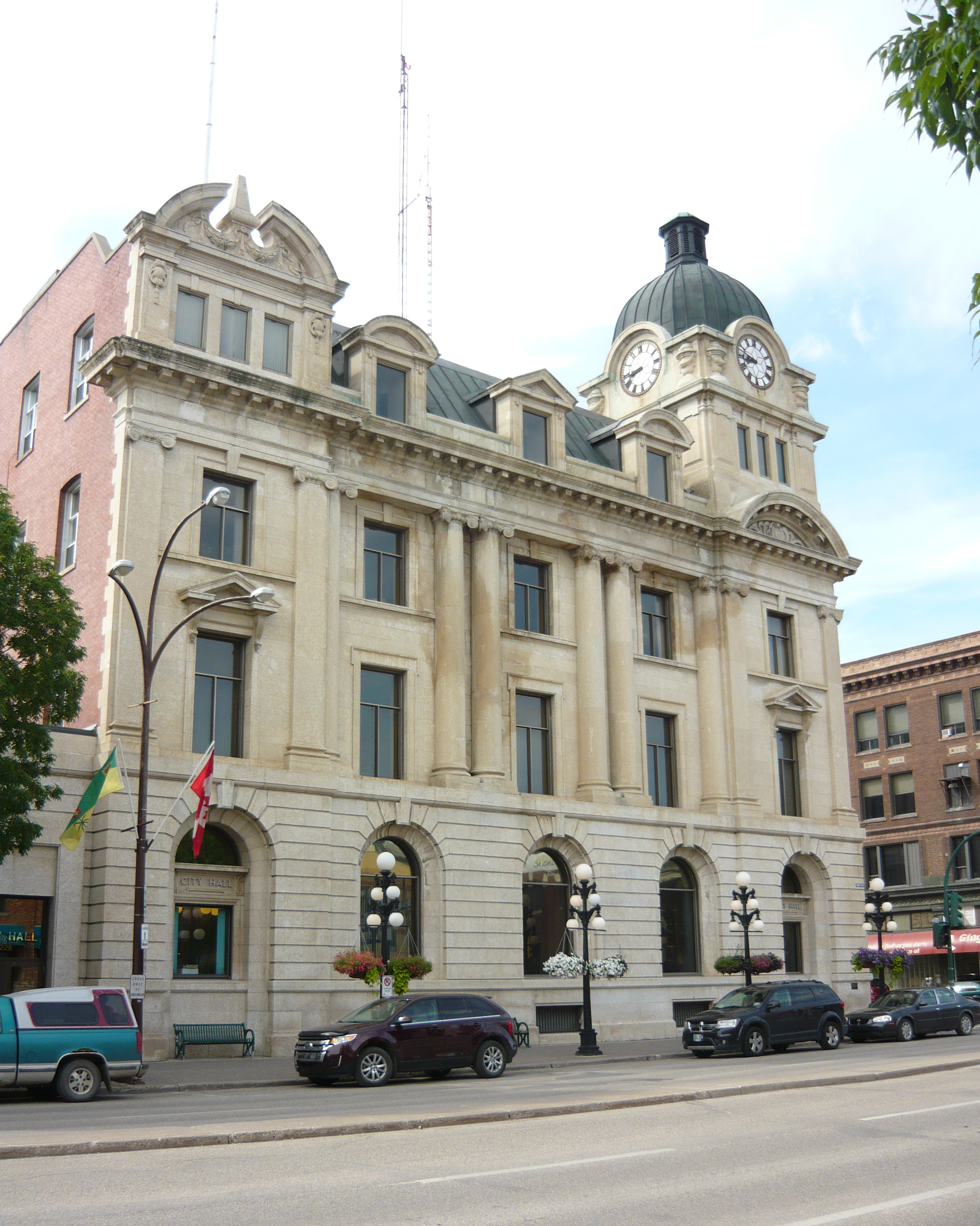
Moose Jaw city hall

== See also ==
- List of communities in Saskatchewan
- List of municipalities in Saskatchewan
