= List of mayors of Saskatoon =

Mayor of Saskatoon
- Incumbent; Cynthia Block since November 20, 2024
- Style: His / Her Worship
- Member of: Saskatoon City Council
- Residence: Saskatoon, Saskatchewan
- Appointer: Direct election by residents of Saskatoon
- Term length: 4 years (since 2012)
- Formation: 1903
- First holder: James Robert Wilson (Town of Saskatoon)
- Website: https://www.saskatoon.ca/city-hall

This is a list of mayors of Saskatoon, the largest city in the central Canadian province of Saskatchewan. The mayor leads Saskatoon City Council, the city's governing body. The 29th and current mayor is Cynthia Block, who was first elected in 2024.

== Background ==
Saskatoon received a town charter in July 1903, which led to the inception of a town council. In May 1906 the Town of Saskatoon merged with the settlements of Riversdale and Nutana, and the City of Saskatoon was incorporated. Until 1954, Saskatoon's mayor was elected annually. From 1954 until 1970, the mayor was elected biannually. The term was then extended to three years, and in 2012 it was extended to four.

From 1920 to 1926 and from 1938 to 1942, Saskatoon mayors were elected using instant-runoff voting. All other times the first past the post system was used.

Until 1976, mayor and council were sworn in during the first meeting of the new year, meaning that terms could be measured in calendar years. From 1976, mayor and council have been sworn in during the first meeting following the election.

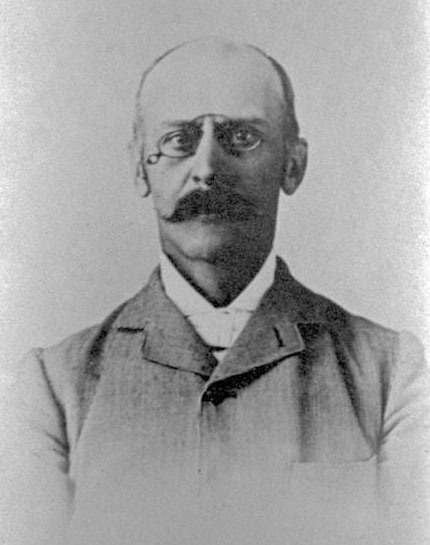
James Clinkskill served as the first mayor of the incorporated City of Saskatoon in 1906. He was also mayor from 1911 to 1912.

== List of mayors ==
Mayors of Saskatoon
#	Mayor	Term start	Term end
Town of Saskatoon
1	James Robert Wilson	1903	1904
2	Malcolm Isbister	1905	1905
City of Saskatoon
3	James Clinkskill	1906	1906
(1)	James Robert Wilson	1907	1908
4	William Hopkins	1909	1910
(3)	James Clinkskill	1911	1912
5	Frederick E. Harrison	1913	1915
6	Alexander MacGillvray Young	1916	1918
7	Frank MacMillan	1919	1919
(6)	Alexander MacGillvray Young	1920	1921
8	Howard McConnell	1922	1923
9	William Harvey Clare	1924	1925
10	Russell Wilson	1926	1926
11	George Wesley Norman	1927	1929
12	John W. Hair	1930	1931
13	Joseph Edwin Underwood	1932	1932
14	John Sproule Mills	1933	1934
15	Robert Mitford Pinder	1935	1938
16	Carl Niderost	1939	1940
17	S. N. MacEachern	1941	1943
18	Angus W. MacPherson	1944	1948
(14)	John Sproule Mills	1949	1953
19	J. D. McAskill	1954	1957
20	Sidney Buckwold	1958	1963
21	Percy C. Klaehn	1964	1964
22	E. J. Cole	1965	1966
(20)	Sidney Buckwold	1967	1971
23	Bert Sears	1972	1976
24	Cliff Wright	1976	1988
25	Henry Dayday	1988	2000
26	Jim Maddin	2000	2003
27	Don Atchison	2003	2016
28	Charlie Clark	2016	2024
29	Cynthia Block	2024	Present

== See also ==
- Saskatoon City Council
