= Woodlawn Cemetery (Saskatoon) =

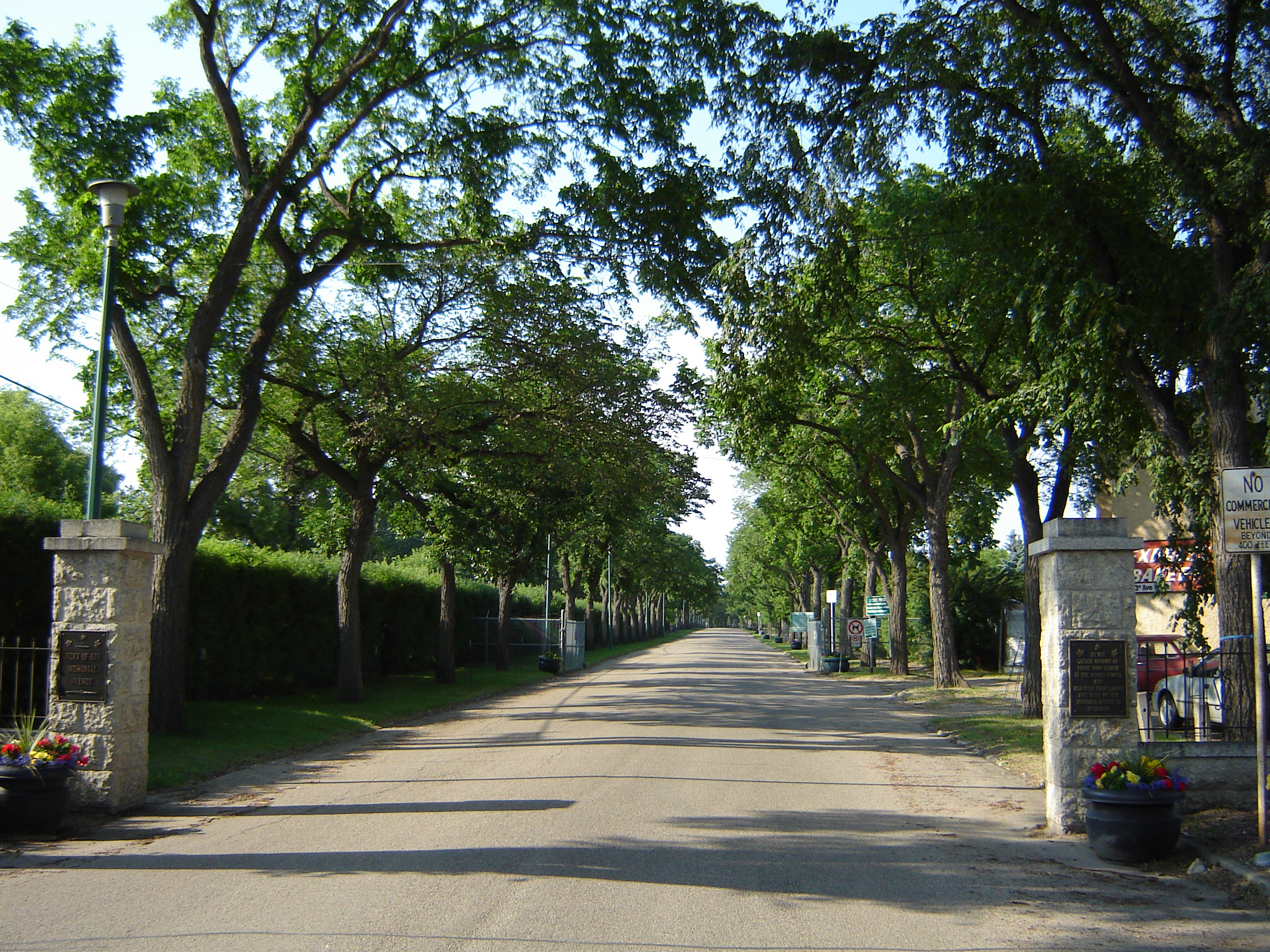
- Interactive map of Woodlawn Cemetery

Details
- Established: 1905
- Location: 1502 – 2nd Avenue North; Saskatoon, Saskatchewan, Canada
- Country: Canada
- Coordinates: 52°9′0″N 106°39′20″W
- Owned by: City of Saskatoon
- Size: 94 acres (0.38 km^{2})
- No. of interments: 63,000+
- Website: Official website
- Find a Grave: Woodlawn Cemetery

Woodlawn Cemetery is a cemetery located in Saskatoon, Saskatchewan, Canada. Located in the cemetery is the Next of Kin Memorial Avenue, a National Historic Site of Canada, that is dedicated to all those who served with Canada's armed forces.

The cemetery was established in 1905 as St. Paul's Roman Catholic Cemetery, with the city taking over responsibility in 1918. Prior to that point in time either the Nutana Pioneer Cemetery in Nutana or the Summerdale Cemetery in the town of Smithville (now annexed into the Blairmore SDA) was used.

The cemetery has been divided into the following sections to specific customs and religious traditions or special affiliations:

- Children
- Infants
- Cremated Remains
- University of Saskatchewan
- Field of Honour (Military)
- Flat Marker
- Upright Monument
- Spiritual Assembly of the Baha'i
- Catholic
- Chinese
- Greek
- Orthodox
- Islamic Ismalian
- Jewish
- Non-Denominational

Block 55 contains the war graves of 107 Commonwealth service personnel of the First and Second World Wars.

== Notable burials ==
- Richard St. Barbe Baker, environmentalist
- Dmytro Cipywnyk, physician and academic
- William Harvey Clare, mayor of Saskatoon
- James Clinkskill, mayor of Saskatoon
- Gerry Couture, NHL hockey player
- Norman James Boswell Fowler, NHL hockey player
- Lyell Gustin, pianist, music educator, and adjudicator
- John W. Hair, mayor of Saskatoon
- William Hopkins, mayor of Saskatoon
- Malcolm Scarth Halsetter Isbister, mayor of Saskatoon
- Percy Klaehn, mayor of Saskatoon
- James Lloyd Klein, NHL hockey player
- Frank MacMillan, Conservative politician
- Angus W. MacPherson, mayor of Saskatoon
- Charlie Mason, NHL hockey player
- John Sproule Mills, mayor of Saskatoon
- George Wesley Norman, mayor of Saskatoon
- Robert Pitford Pinder, mayor of Saskatoon
- Herbert Sidney Sears, mayor of Saskatoon
- Reinhold Tamke, proprietor of Little Chief Service Station and owner of the farm land that became The Willows, Saskatoon
- Joseph Edwin Underwood, mayor of Saskatoon
- James Robert Wilson, mayor of Saskatoon
- Russell Wilson, mayor of Saskatoon
- Alexander MacGillivray Young, mayor of Saskatoon, Member of the House of Commons of Canada
