= Russell Wilson (Canadian politician) =

Canadian politician & merchant (1864–1936)

10th Mayor of Saskatoon
- In office January 1926 – September 1926
- Preceded by: William Harvey Clare
- Succeeded by: George Wesley Norman

Member of the Saskatoon City Council
- In office 1923–1925

Member of the Saskatoon School Board
- In office 1911-1912
- In office 1906-1910

Personal details
- Born: June 22, 1864 near Almonte, Ontario, Canada
- Died: November 13, 1936 (aged 72) Saskatoon, Saskatchewan, Canada
- Spouse: Ida May Dunham (m. 1909)
- Relations: James Robert Wilson

Russell Wilson (June 22, 1864 – November 13, 1936) was a politician and merchant in Saskatchewan, Canada. He had served as a member of the Saskatoon's city council and went on to become the city's mayor in 1926.

Wilson was born near Almonte, Canada West, to Robert and Jane Wilson. He received his education in Carleton County and, with his family, homesteaded on Beaver Creek near Hanley in 1883. The family had bought 190 acres of land in Beaver Creek. After leaving home, Wilson worked in Moose Jaw, as guide for the transport department during the North-West Rebellion and served as a railway contractor along with his brother from 1884 to 1885. Wilson started merchandising in dray in 1883. From 1893 to 1896, he traded in food and livery along with H. McDonald. Wilson and his brothers sold the property after their parents moved to Saskatoon in 1899. After selling their property Wilson continued his business in partnership with his brother Archibald. The two brothers started Wilson Bros., a livery business; they later sold the company and began trading in carriages, harnesses and automobiles. In 1909, he married Ida Dunham of Brockville. Wilson served as the director of the Saskatoon Milling Company (later sold to Quaker Oats), and the Northwestern Telephone Company. He also served on the Soldier Land Settlement Board in 1919, and on Saskatoon's city council from 1923 to 1925.

Wilson was a member of the Saskatoon School Board from 1906 to 1910 and from 1911 to 1912. After the University of Saskatchewan was established in 1907, Wilson became a member of the University's senate in 1914. In November 1925, Wilson was elected mayor of Saskatoon by acclamation, succeeding William Harvey Clare. After he suffered two strokes, the city's council granted him a leave of absence in September 1926. He was the shortest-serving mayor in Saskatoon's history. George Wesley Norman succeeded him. After suffering another stroke Wilson died in 1936. He was buried in Woodlawn Cemetery.

His brother James served as the first mayor of Saskatoon after it was incorporated as a town on July 1, 1903.

In 2006 it was found that a joint account (which he shared with a priest) had a total of $938.06 in it and the amount had remained unclaimed for the past 77 years. The account was not interest-bearing, so the balance had not changed since 1929. Whether the account has been claimed or not is unknown.
