= Arbor Creek, Saskatoon =

Arbor Creek
- Neighbourhood
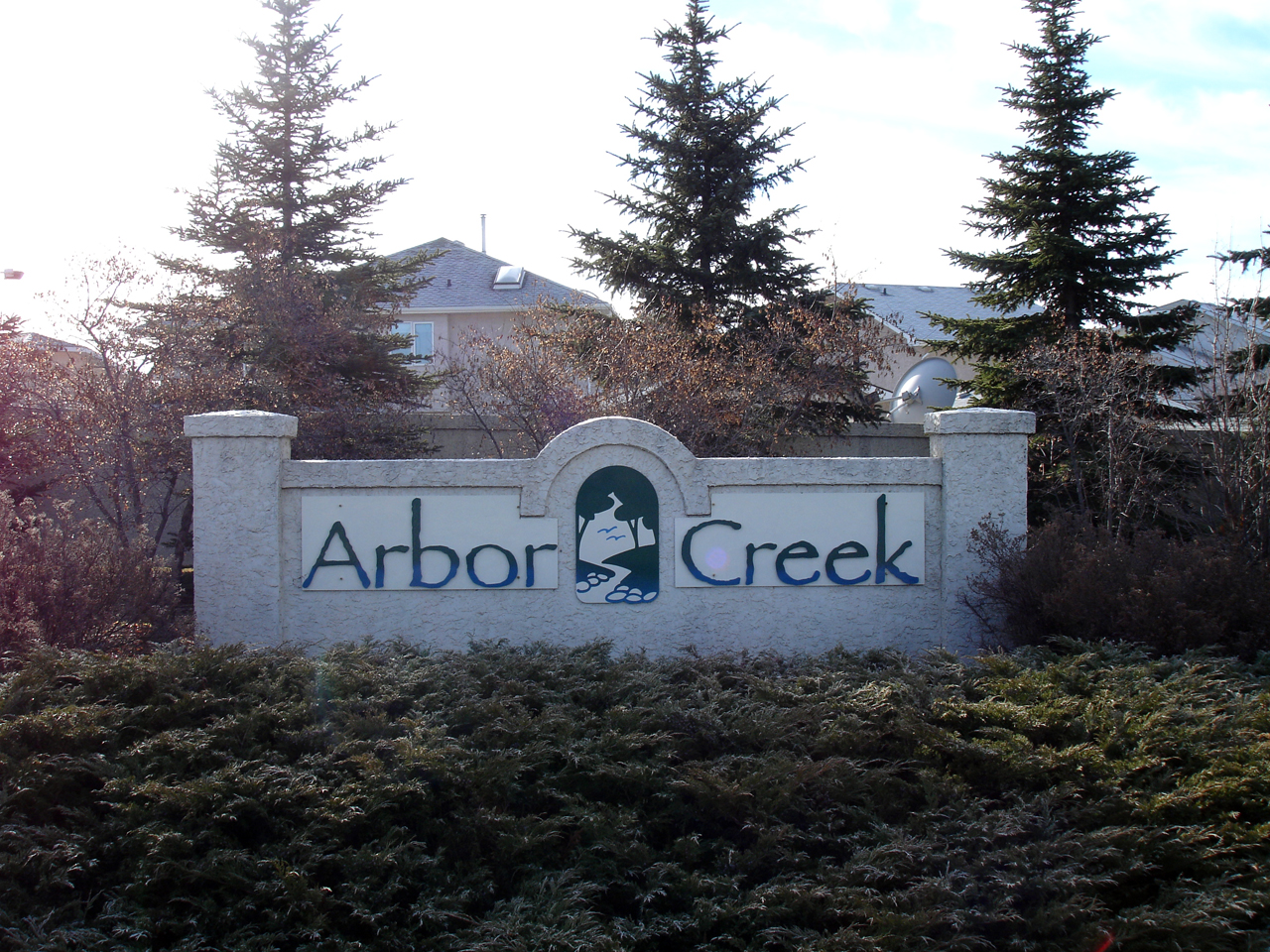
- Arbor Creek entrance sign

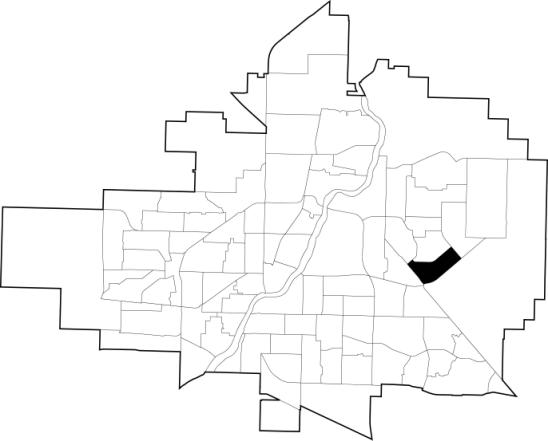
- Arbor Creek location map
- Coordinates: 52°7′56″N 106°34′5″W
- Country: Canada
- Province: Saskatchewan
- City: Saskatoon
- Suburban Development Area: University Heights
- Neighbourhood: Arbor Creek
- Annexed: 1980-1984
- Construction: 1996-2006

Government
  - Type: Municipal (Ward 10)
  - Administrative body: Saskatoon City Council
  - Councillor: Zach Jeffries

Area
  - Total: 1.42 km^{2} (0.55 sq mi)

Population (2006)
  - Total: 4,654
  - Average Income: $99,489
- Time zone: UTC-6 (UTC)
- Website: Erindale/Arbor Creek Community Association

Arbor Creek is a primarily residential neighbourhood located in northeast Saskatoon, Saskatchewan, Canada. It is mostly made up of low-density single detached dwellings. As of 2006, the area is home to 4,654 residents. The neighbourhood is considered a high-income area, with an average family income of $99,631, an average dwelling value of $327,262 and a home ownership rate of 92.5%.

== History ==
The land on which Arbor Creek now sits was annexed between 1980 and 1984. The majority of residential construction was done between 1996 and 2006, with a small amount of construction before this (the area first appeared on city maps in the late 1980s, branded as part of the neighboring Erindale community before being split off in the early 1990s). The housing stock is composed mostly of low density, single detached houses. Roadways feature the names of prominent local personalities, many of them musicians, as well as several former mayors:

- Adaskin Cove - Murray Adaskin, LL.D., D.Mus.; conductor, composer, teacher and violinist.
- Beckett Green - Garth Beckett; pianist with the Saskatoon Symphony Orchestra.
- Buckwold Cove - Sidney Buckwold; former mayor of Saskatoon and former Liberal senator.
- Budz Bay, Lane, Terrace, Crescent, Green - Victor James Budz; firefighter killed in the Queen's Hotel Fire on May 31, 1980.
- Guenter Terrace Crescent, Bay - Dennis Aron Guenter; firefighter killed in the Queen's Hotel Fire on May 31, 1980.
- Kaplan Green - Dr. David L. Kaplan, C.M.; recipient of the Saskatchewan Order of Merit, former head of the University of Saskatchewan's Department of Music and former conductor of the Saskatoon Symphony Orchestra.
- McFarland Place - Reginald B. McFarland; Professor of Music.
- Overholt Crescent, Terrace, Court - Dorothy Overholt; Saskatoon Symphony concertmaster.
- Sears Cove: Bert Sears, former mayor of Saskatoon
- Wright Way, Court, Crescent, Terrace, Place, Bay - Clifford Wright, former mayor of Saskatoon

== Government and politics ==
Arbor Creek exists within the federal electoral district of Saskatoon—University. It is currently represented by Corey Tochor of the Conservative Party of Canada, first elected in 2019.

Provincially, the area is within the constituency of Saskatoon Willowgrove. It is currently represented by Ken Cheveldayoff of the Saskatchewan Party, first elected in 2003.

In Saskatoon's non-partisan municipal politics, Arbor Creek lies within ward 10. It is currently represented by Zach Jeffries, first elected in 2012.

== Institutions ==
=== Education ===
No schools exist in Arbor Creek. Though land was set aside for schools, the public and separate school boards decided to build schools in the adjacent Willowgrove neighbourhood. The land is now being readied for more single-family homes. Schools also already exist in the adjacent Erindale and Forest Grove neighbourhoods.

== Parks and recreation ==
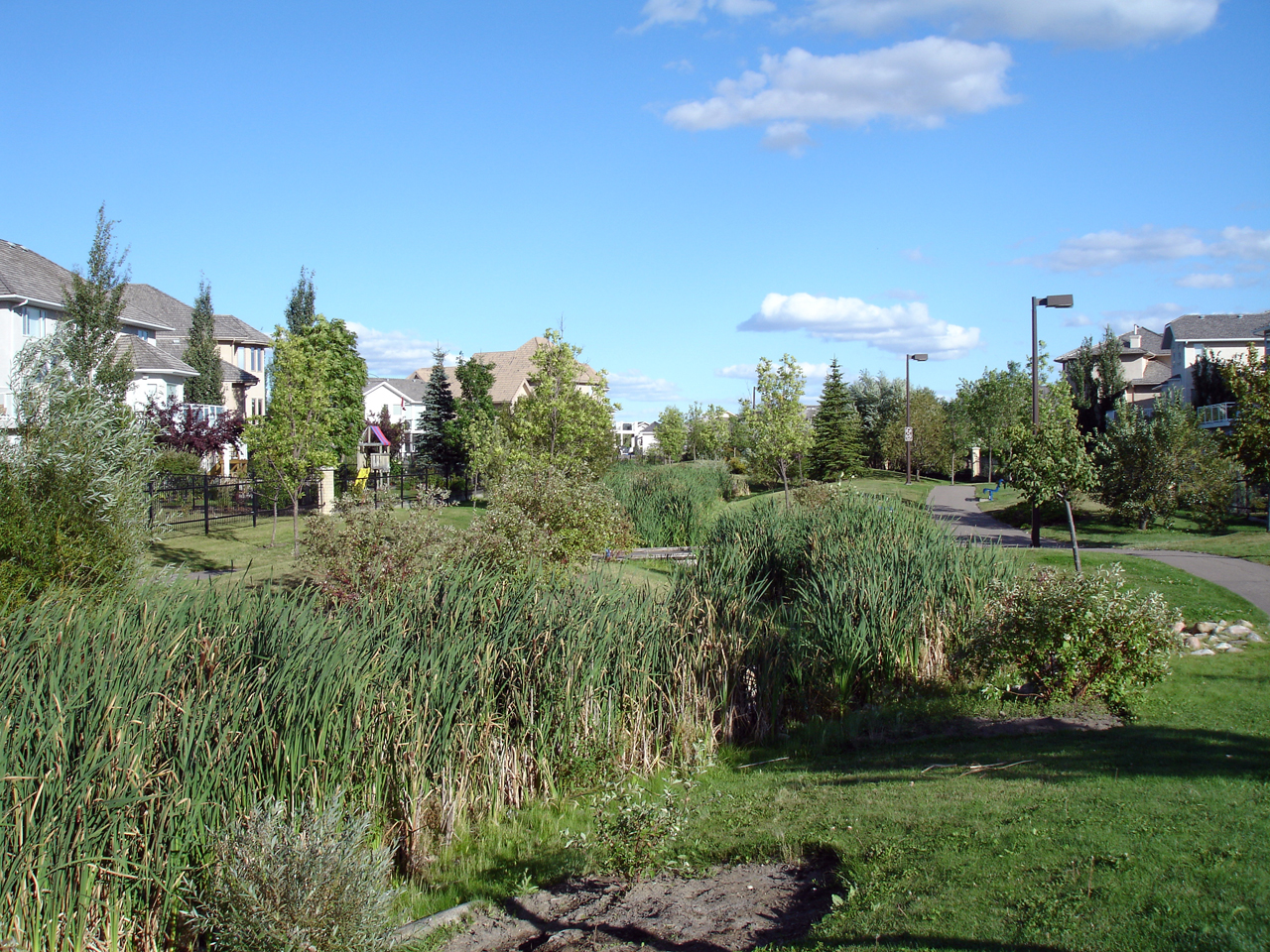
Arbor Creek Linear Park

- Kaplan Green (0.6 acres)
- Beckett Green Pocket Park (1.8 acres)
- Budz Green Pocket Park (2.1 acres)
- Arbor Creek Linear Park (7.0 acres)
- Arbor Creek Neighbourhood Park (20.7 acres)

The Erindale/Arbor Creek Community Association organizes events and activities for its residents. Programs operate out of Father Robinson and Dr. John G. Egnatoff Schools as well as neighbourhood parks. The Association also plays an important role in representing the interests of residents in key community issues such as schools and parks.

== Commercial ==
There is no commercial development in Arbor Creek. 51 home-based businesses exist in the area.

== Location ==
Arbor Creek is located within the University Heights Suburban Development Area. It is bounded by McOrmond Drive to the east, College Drive and the Canadian Pacific Railway tracks to the south, Berini Drive to the west, and Kerr Road to the north. Kenderdine Road is the subdivision's main collector road. An extension of McKercher Drive from 105th Street is planned for the future to add an additional entrance/egress point for the community, and as of 2017 construction is under way on an interchange at McOrmond and College.
