= Herbert Sears =

Herbert Sears may refer to:

- Bert Sears (Herbert Sydney Sears), English-born politician in Saskatchewan, Canada
- Herbert M. Sears, yachtsman and businessman in Boston, Massachusetts
