= Ernest J. Cole =

Canadian politician

Mayor of Saskatoon
- In office 1965-1966
- Preceded by: Percy Klaehn
- Succeeded by: Sidney Buckwold

Personal details
- Born: 1916; Anerley, Saskatchewan
- Died: November 9, 2000 (aged 83–84)
- Occupation: Engineer

Ernest Julian Cole (1916 – November 9, 2000) was an engineer and politician who served as mayor of Saskatoon, Saskatchewan from 1965 to 1966. He was the first Saskatoon mayor born in Saskatchewan.

== Early years and career ==
Cole was born in Anerley, Saskatchewan and was educated in Conquest and at the Saskatoon Normal School. He went on to study Engineering at the University of Saskatchewan.

Cole served in the Royal Canadian Engineers during the Second World War. His career after the war included six years at the National Research Council in Ottawa and one year with Power Corporation in Montreal. In 1956, he became assistant engineer for the City of Saskatoon.

== Political career ==
Cole ran for mayor in 1964 despite having no experience with City Council. He ran a campaign based on reducing capital expenditures. When he was elected, upsetting incumbent Percy Klaehn, he was only the second person after Angus W. MacPherson to become mayor without first serving on Council. He also became the first mayor to have been born in the province. He was defeated in his 1966 re-election attempt by former mayor Sidney Buckwold. Later that year, Cole returned to Ottawa to work for the federal Department of Public Works.

== Personal life and ==
Cole and his wife Mary, had a son and a daughter. Mary died in 1966. Cole Avenue in the Westview neighbourhood of Saskatoon was named in his honour.

== See also ==
- List of mayors of Saskatoon
