= Sidney Buckwold =

Canadian politician (1916–2001)

The Honourable Sidney Buckwold OC

Canadian Senator from Saskatchewan
- In office November 4, 1971 – November 3, 1991
- Appointed by: Pierre Trudeau

Mayor of Saskatoon
- In office 1967–1971
- Preceded by: E. J. Cole
- Succeeded by: Bert Sears
- In office 1958–1963
- Preceded by: J. D. McAskill
- Succeeded by: Percy C. Klaehn

Saskatoon City Alderman
- In office 1953–1958

Personal details
- Born: November 3, 1916 Winnipeg, Manitoba, Canada
- Died: June 27, 2001 (aged 84) Saskatoon, Saskatchewan, Canada
- Party: Liberal
- Education: McGill University (BCom)
- Occupation: Businessman

Sidney Labe Buckwold, OC (November 3, 1916 – June 27, 2001) was a Canadian politician, soldier, and businessman. From 1958 until 1963, and 1967 until 1971, Buckwold served as a mayor of Saskatoon. On November 4, 1971, he was appointed to the Senate of Canada.

== Early life ==
Buckwold was born in Winnipeg, Manitoba to Harry Buckwold and Dorothy Friedman in 1916. The family moved to Saskatoon in 1925, where Buckwold attended Buena Vista School, Nutana Collegiate and the University of Saskatchewan, before going to Montreal and receiving a Bachelor of Commerce from McGill University. Afterwards, he returned to Saskatoon and worked for his father's dry goods store, Buckwold’s Ltd.

During the Second World War he served as an officer with the Canadian Army Service Corps from 1942 to 1945. After the war he returned to Saskatoon and Buckwold's Ltd.

== Political career ==
=== Saskatoon City Council ===
Buckwold was first elected to Saskatoon City Council as an alderman in 1953. When John D. McAskill resigned as mayor in 1958, Buckwold ran to replace him, and was elected mayor. Buckwold was the first Jewish mayor in Saskatoon's history.

Buckwold himself resigned as mayor in 1963 in order to run as a Liberal candidate in the federal election in the Saskatoon riding. He lost to the Progressive Conservative candidate, Henry Frank Jones. He ran again in the 1964 by-election after Jones' death, but lost again, this time to Jones' widow, Eloise.

In 1967, Buckwold returned to the mayor's office, and served in the role until 1971. During his time in office, Buckwold help to lay the groundwork for a revitalization of downtown Saskatoon by moving the Canadian National Railway lines outside of the city. In their place the city constructed a new cultural centre, Centennial Auditorium, and a shopping centre. The federal government was so impressed with this successful vision of urban renewal that it began providing grants to other Canadian cities to move rail lines out of core urban areas. Outside of the downtown core, Buckwold established the Mendel Art Gallery, which would be the city's main gallery well into the twenty first century. He also oversaw the construction of the city's first freeway and the Idylwyld Bridge.

Buckwold was generally known as a booster of Saskatoon, and another former Senator from Saskatchewan, David Tkachuk, credited Buckwold with taking "a sleepy prairie agricultural town and imbu[ing] it with spirit and pride." To help raise the profile of the city, he brought the Canada Winter Games to Saskatoon in 1971, for which the city constructed a small ski hill.

=== Canadian Senate ===
In 1971, he resigned again as mayor, this time to accept an appointment to the Canadian Senate on the recommendation of Prime Minister Pierre Trudeau. A Liberal, he served as Government Whip in the Senate and as Vice-Chairman of the National Liberal Caucus, and he became affectionately known as "Senator Sid." However, he was an advocate for Senate reform, arguing in favour of an elected Senate with better regional representation and less partisanship. He served as a Senator until retiring in 1991 at age 75.

== Personal life and legacy ==
Buckwold married Clarice Rabinovitch in 1939 and they had three children named Jay, Judy, and Linda. He remained active in community life for many years, serving with organizations such as Community Chest and the Rotary Club, and he was a founding member of the local branch of the Canadian Diabetes Association.

Buckwold received numerous honours throughout his life and career. He was named Saskatoon Citizen of the Year in 1971. In 1982, he received an honorary Doctor of Laws degree from the University of Saskatchewan. In 1995, he was made an Officer of the Order of Canada. He was also made an honorary Colonel of the North Saskatchewan Regiment for his military service.

Buckwold died on June 27, 2001, aged 84. After his death, the City of Saskatoon renamed the Idylwyld Bridge, which was built during his time as mayor, to Senator Sid Buckwold Bridge in his honour. Buckwold Cove in the Arbor Creek neighbourhood and Sidney L. Buckwold Park in East College Park also bear his name.

== See also ==
- List of mayors of Saskatoon
