= James Robert Wilson =

Canadian politician and merchant (1866–1941)

Russell Wilson

Mayor of the City of Saskatoon
- In office 1907–1908
- Preceded by: James Clinkskill
- Succeeded by: William Hopkins

Councilor of the Village of Saskatoon
- In office January 1906 – July 1906

1st Mayor of the Village of Saskatoon
- In office July 10, 1903 – 1904
- Preceded by: Position Established
- Succeeded by: Malcolm Isbister

Overseer for the Village of Saskatoon
- In office January 1903 – July 1, 1903

Personal details
- Born: June 22, 1864 near Almonte, Ontario, Canada
- Died: November 13, 1936 (aged 72) Saskatoon, Saskatchewan, Canada
- Spouse: Ida May Dunham (m. 1909)
- Relations: Russell Wilson

James Robert Wilson (September 16, 1866 – April 3, 1941) was a Canadian politician.

Born in Almonte, Canada West, he moved to Moose Jaw, Saskatchewan in 1884 and was employed at a grocery and hardware store. During the 1885 North-West Rebellion he led the first medical corps to Saskatoon. After the rebellion he worked as a farmer, before opening a general store in Saskatoon in 1896.

In January 1903 he was elected overseer over the village of Saskatoon, and when on July 1 of that year the village was incorporated as a town, he became its first mayor. He served until 1904, and again later as mayor of the by now city of Saskatoon from 1907 to 1908. He also sat on the city council from 1914 to 1919.

In his times as mayor he personally guaranteed a bank loan that allowed for the completion of sewer, water and electrical works, and it was also whilst he was mayor that Saskatoon's City Park was purchased.

Wilson also tried his hand at national politics, standing unsuccessfully as a federal candidate for the Conservatives in 1908, before managing to be elected in 1917. He served for four years, including a spell as a cabinet minister, before being defeated in 1921.

His brother Russell also served as mayor of Saskatoon.

Wilson Crescent, which runs through Saskatoon's Avalon, Adelaide/Churchill and Nutana Park neighbourhoods, is named in James Wilson's honour.

Parliament of Canada
Preceded by George Ewan McCraney	Member of Parliament for Saskatoon; 1917–1921	Succeeded by John Evans
