= John W. Hair =

Saskatoon mayor

- Born: 1880; Dunlop, Ayrshire, Scotland
- Died: March 18, 1941 (aged 61)
- Burial place: Woodlawn Cemetery, Saskatoon
- Occupation: politician
- Known for: Saskatoon mayor
- Spouse: married
- Children: 2 daughters

John William Hair (1880 – March 18, 1941) was a Scottish-born politician in Saskatchewan, who served as mayor of Saskatoon from 1930 to 1931.

== Biography ==
Hair was born in Dunlop, Ayrshire and was educated in Glasgow. Before coming to North America in 1907, he worked in South Africa and South America. Later that year, his fiancée joined him and they were married in Winnipeg; they had two daughters. Hair worked for Saskatoon businessman John Clarence Drinkle as manager of Saskatoon's first automatic telephone system, and later as manager of the Great West Furniture Company. In 1914, with a partner, he bought the company and expanded it into a chain of furniture stores. He was also involved in real estate speculation.

Hair was a member of Saskatoon city council in 1926, from 1928 to 1929, and from 1932 to 1933 as an alderman. He also served on the board of governors for the University of Saskatchewan. He had succeeded George Wesley Norman as the mayor of the city in 1930. He served as mayor till 1931 and was succeeded by Joseph Edwin Underwood.

While attending a conference on unemployment in Winnipeg in summer 1930, Mayor Hair confidently declared that the situation in Saskatoon was "under control"; this evaluation was subsequently proven to be "terribly wrong". During the Great Depression the global economy was severely affected; out of $750,000 paid as unemployment relief bills in the province of Saskatchewan, $300,000 was paid by the Saskatoon municipal administration.

Hair died at the age of 61 on March 18, 1941, and was buried in Woodlawn Cemetery. John Hair Crescent in Saskatoon's Avalon community is named in his honour; it one of a small number of streets in the city to have the honoree's given and surname in its name.
