= Next of Kin Memorial Avenue =

Part of Woodlawn Cemetery in Saskatchewan, Canada

- City of Saskatoon & IODE
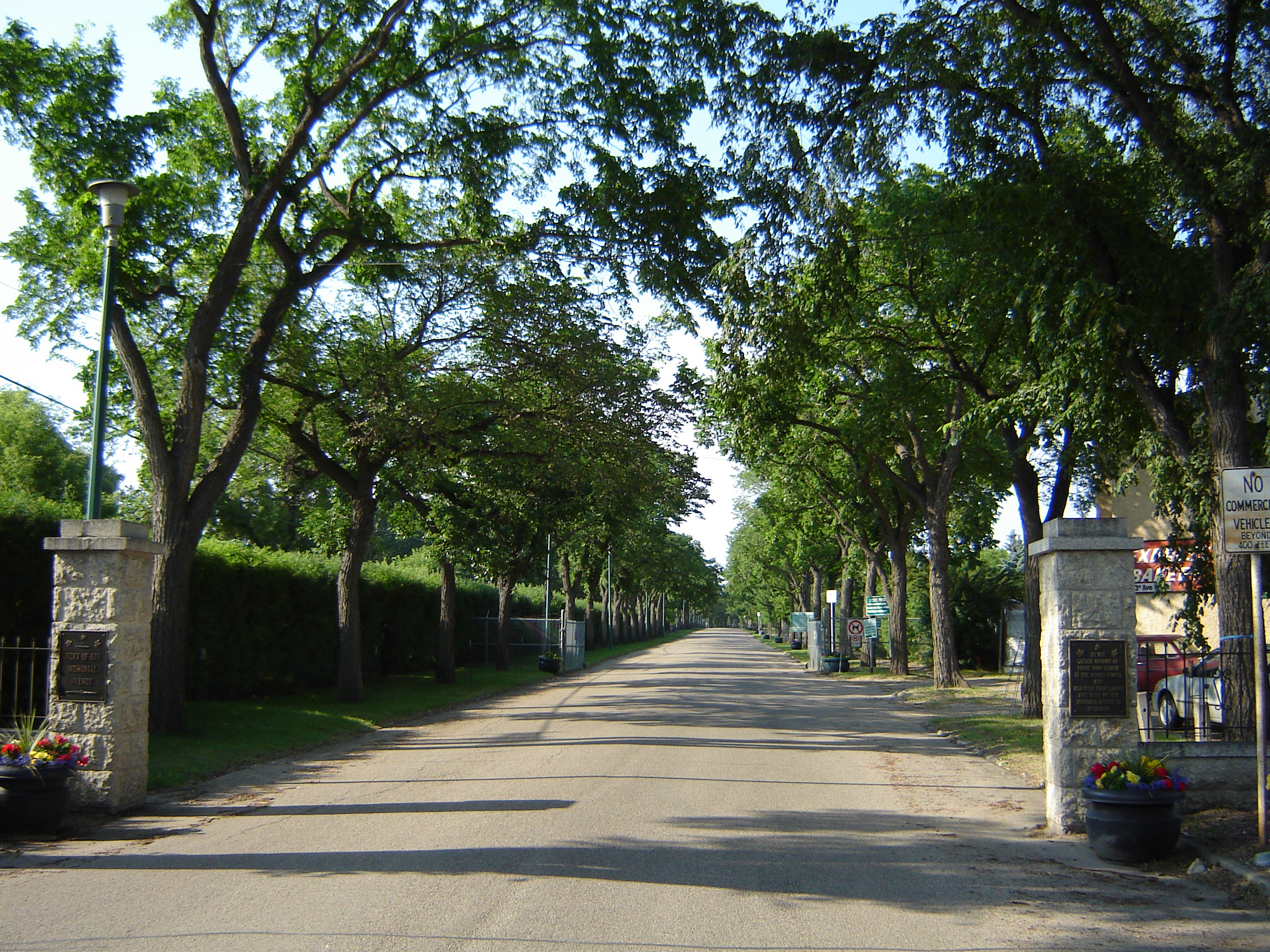
- Next of Kin Memorial Avenue
- For World War I and ensuing wars
- Established: 1922–1923
- Location: 52°08′49.36″N 106°39′29.27″W near Saskatoon

Burials by nation
- Canada

Burials by war
- World War I and those afterwards

National Historic Site of Canada
- Official name: Next of Kin Memorial Avenue National Historic Site of Canada
- Designated: 1992

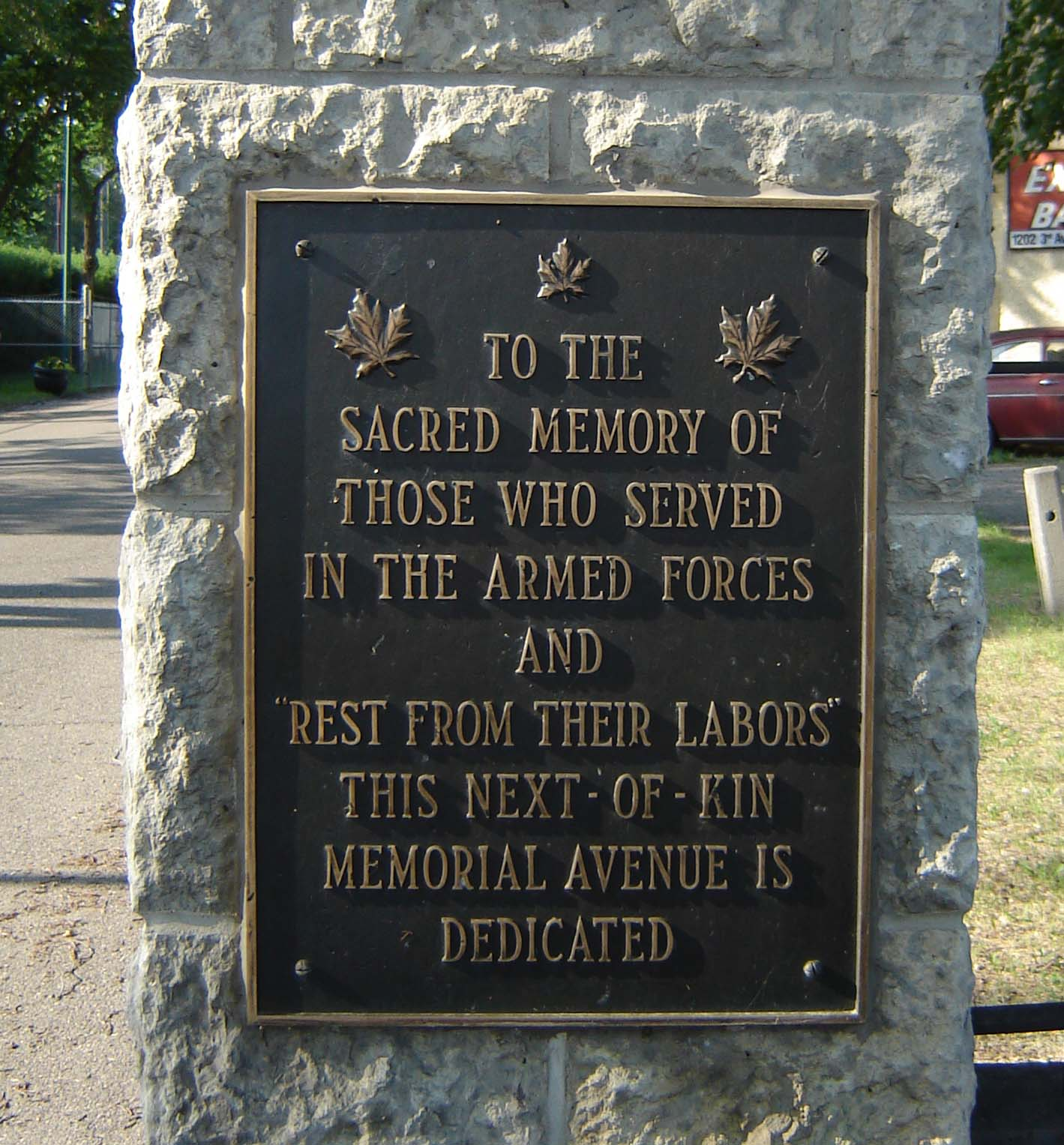
Plaque 2 The Next-Of-Kin Memorial Avenue at Woodlawn Cemetery Saskatoon

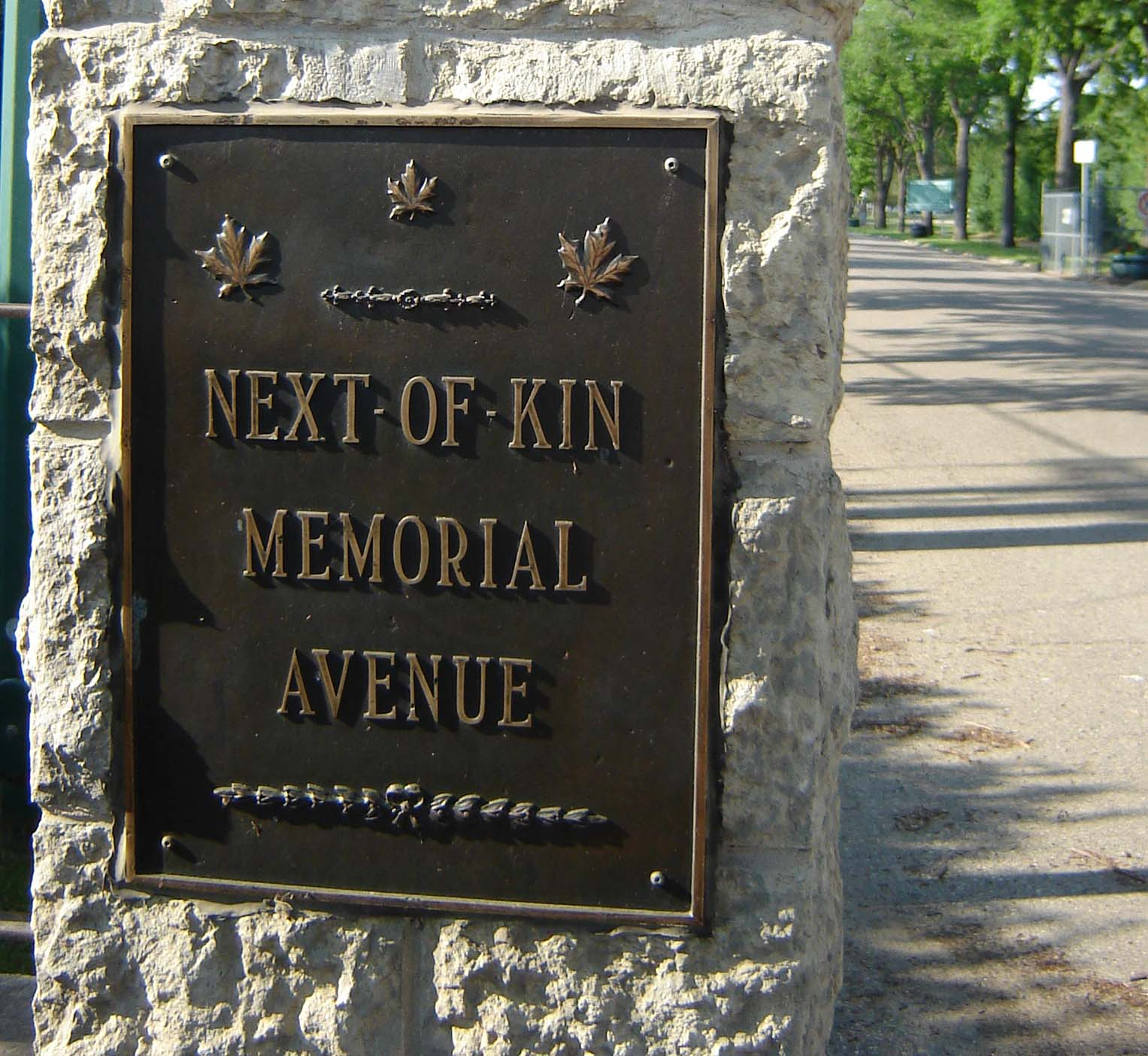
Plaque 3 The Next-Of-Kin Memorial Avenue at Woodlawn Cemetery Saskatoon

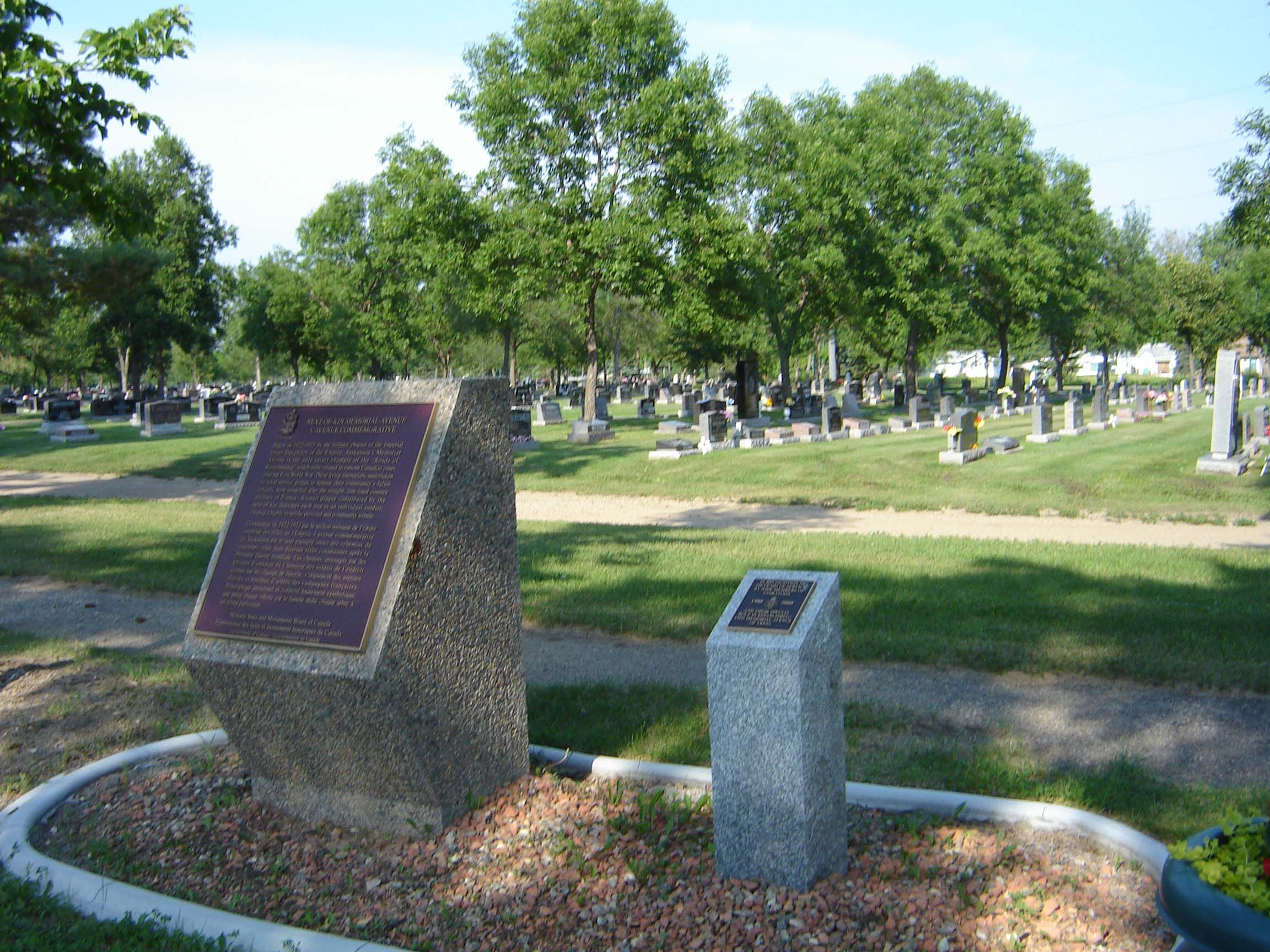
The Next-Of-Kin Memorial Avenue at Woodlawn Cemetery Saskatoon

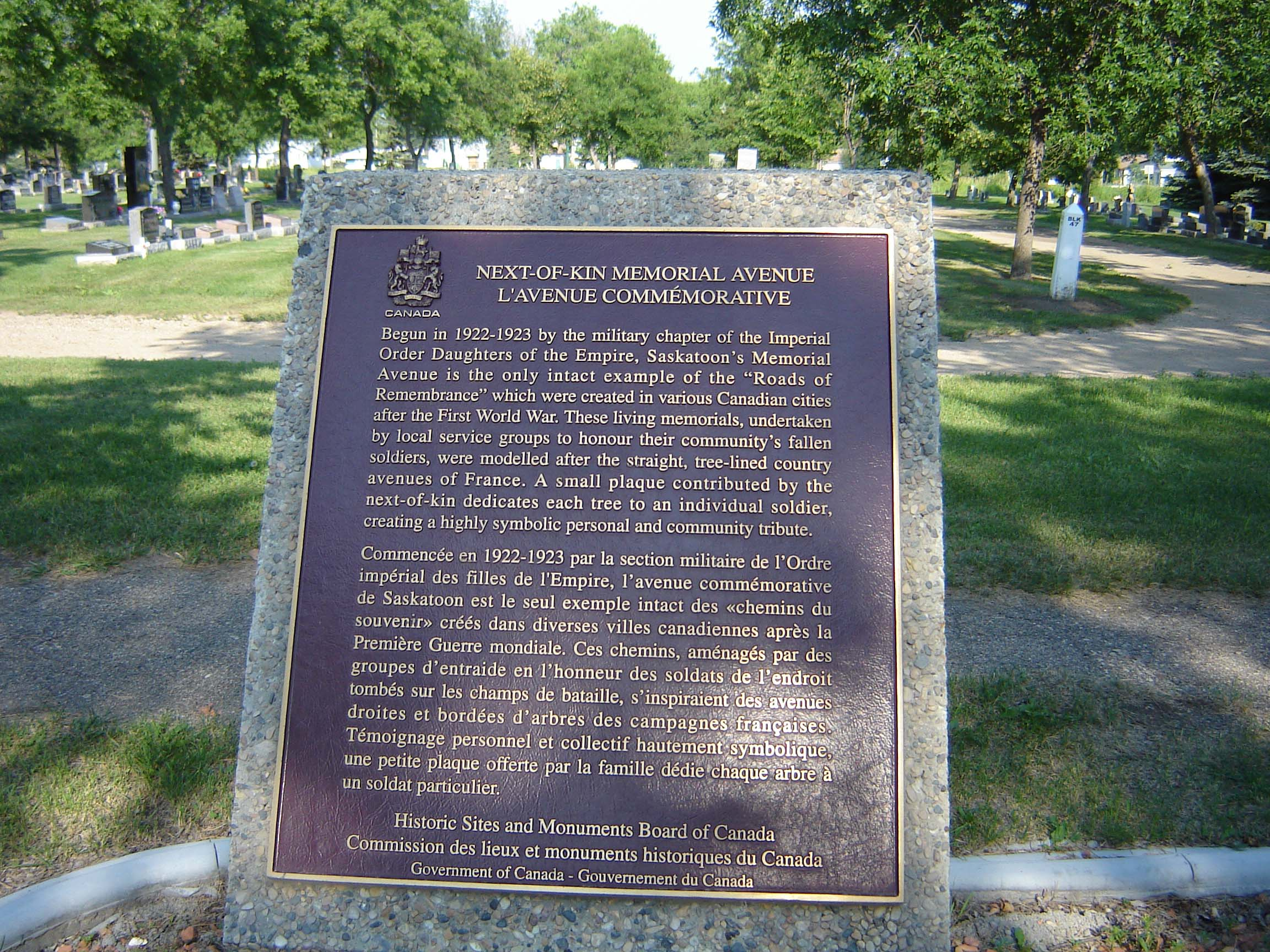
Plaque 4 The Next-Of-Kin Memorial Avenue at Woodlawn Cemetery Saskatoon

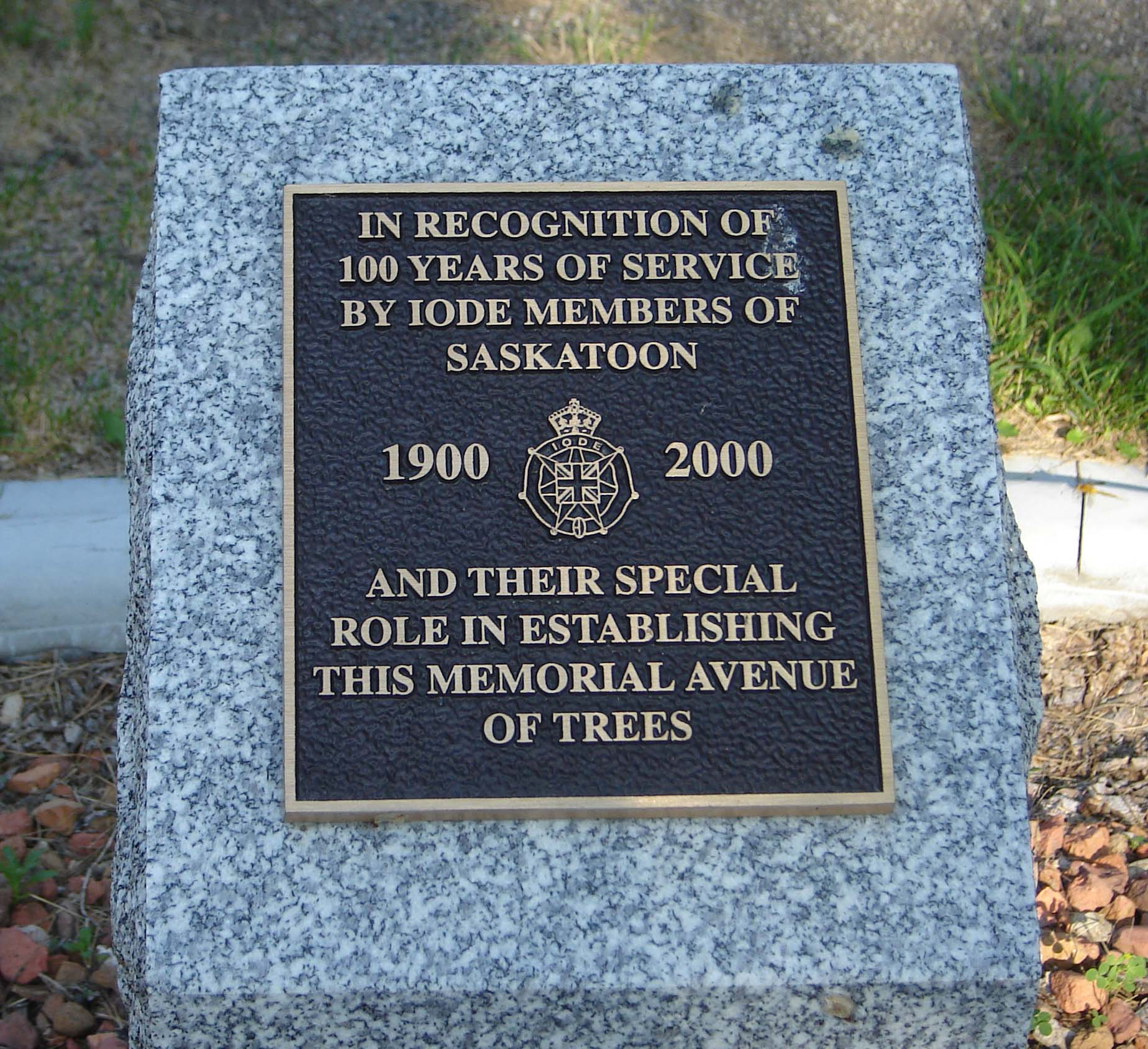
Plaque 5 The Next-Of-Kin Memorial Avenue at Woodlawn Cemetery Saskatoon

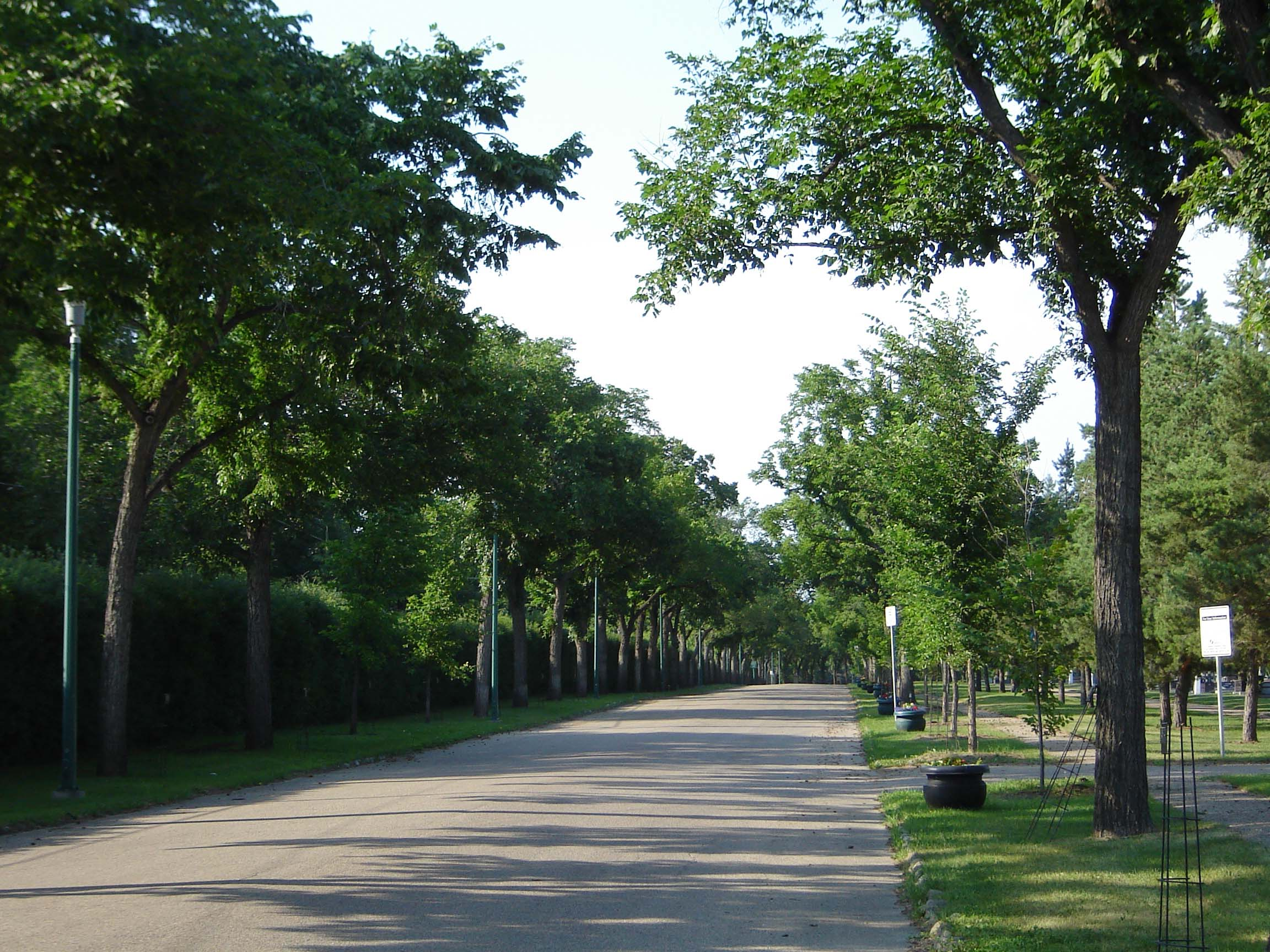
The Next-Of-Kin Memorial Avenue at Woodlawn Cemetery Saskatoon.

Next of Kin Memorial Avenue is a roadway and National Historic Site of Canada which is part of Woodlawn Cemetery in Saskatoon, Saskatchewan, Canada. Trees along the roadway are dedicated to Saskatoon's war dead. On official city maps, however, the street's name is abbreviated to Memorial Avenue. Many other trees along other roadways within the cemetery are also similarly dedicated.

== Memorial plaques ==
=== Plaque 2 ===
- To the sacred memory of those who served in the armed forces and rest from their labors This Next-Of-Kin Memorial Avenue is dedicated.

=== Plaque 3 ===
- Next-of-kin Memorial Avenue

=== Plaque 4 ===
- Next-of-Kin Memorial Avenue L'Avenue Commémorative

Begun in 1922–1923 by the military chapter of the Imperial Order Daughters of the Empire, Saskatoon's Memorial Avenue is the only intact example of the "Roads of Remembrance" which were created in various Canadian cities after the First World War. These living memorials, undertaken by local service groups to honour their community's fallen soldiers, were modeled after the straight, tree lined country avenues of France. A small plaque contributed by the next-of-kin dedicates each tree to an individual soldier, created a highly symbolic personal and community tribute.

Commencée en 1922–1923 par la section militaire de l'Ordre impérial des filles de l'Empire, l'avenue commémorative de Saskatoon est le seul example intact des chemins du souvenir créés dans diverses villes canadiennes après la premiere Guere mondiale. Ces chemins, aménagés par des groupes d'entraide en l'honneur des soldats de l'endroit tombés sur les champs de bataille, s'inspiraient des avenues droites et bordées dárbres des campagnes françaises. Témoignage personnel et collectif hautement symbolique, une petite plaque offerte par la famille dédie chaque arbre à un soldat particulier.

Historic Sites and Monuments Board of Canada

Commission des lieux et monuments historiques du Canada

Government of Canada

Gouvernement du Canada

=== Plaque 5 ===
- In recognition of 100 years of service by IODE members of Saskatoon. 1900–2000. and their special role in establishing this memorial avenue of trees.

== Nearby ==
- Municipal Heritage Properties: Alexander House City Park, Core Neighbourhoods SDA, Saskatoon, Saskatchewan.
- Saskatoon City Hospital

== See also ==
- History of Saskatoon
