= Elk Point, Saskatoon =

Elk Point
- Neighbourhood
- Interactive map of Elk Point
- Coordinates: 52°9′11″N 106°44′56″W
- Country: Canada
- Province: Saskatchewan
- City: Saskatoon
- Suburban Development Area: Blairmore
- Construction: 2013—Ongoing

Government
  - Type: Municipal (Ward 4)
  - Administrative body: Saskatoon City Council
  - Councillor: Troy Davies

Area
  - Total: 2.31 km^{2} (0.89 sq mi)

Population
  - Total: 10,290 (est. upon buildout)
  - Average Income: $
- Time zone: UTC-6 (UTC)

Elk Point is a proposed residential neighbourhood in Saskatoon, Saskatchewan, north of 33rd Street and west of the Dundonald community. It will be the second primarily residential neighbourhood to be developed in the city's Blairmore Sector.

The neighbourhood is expected to accommodate a mix of housing options while supporting connectivity for all modes of transportation. Upon completion, Elk Point is expected to be home to approximately 10,000 residents. As of April 2017, Elk Point was in the planning phase.

Some early servicing work was already underway by the spring of 2017, prior to the community plan being officially presented to Saskatoon City Council. As of early 2019, full development of the community had yet to commence.
