= John Sproule Mills =

Politician

John Sproule Mills (1887 – October 28, 1972) was an Irish-born politician in Canada. He served as mayor of Saskatoon, Saskatchewan from 1933 to 1934 and from 1949 to 1953.

He was born in Derry, Ireland and was educated at the National University of Ireland. He also schooled at the University of London, at Columbia University in New York City and at McMaster University. Mills taught school in Montreal for four years and then moved to Saskatoon, where he was principal of King Edward School for eight years and of the Saskatoon Normal School for eleven years. He had also been the president of the Saskatoon Boys Band. In 1940, Mills moved to Moose Jaw to teach at the Normal School there, later returning to Saskatoon.

He served as a member of Saskatoon city council from 1925 to 1928, from 1930 to 1931, from 1936 to 1938 and from 1946 to 1947. Mills ran unsuccessfully for the position of mayor several times between his two terms in office and retired from politics after running unsuccessfully for reelection against J. D. McAskill in 1953. The first traffic lights in the city were installed during his time in office. He had five children from his wife Ethel. Mills had produced several films. It is said that in his later years he along with his wife traveled 10,000 miles every year.

He died at the age of 85 on October 28, 1972 and was buried in Woodlawn Cemetery.

Mills Crescent in the Avalon neighbourhood in Saskatoon was named in his honour.
