= 8th Canadian Infantry Brigade =

Brigade of the Canadian Army

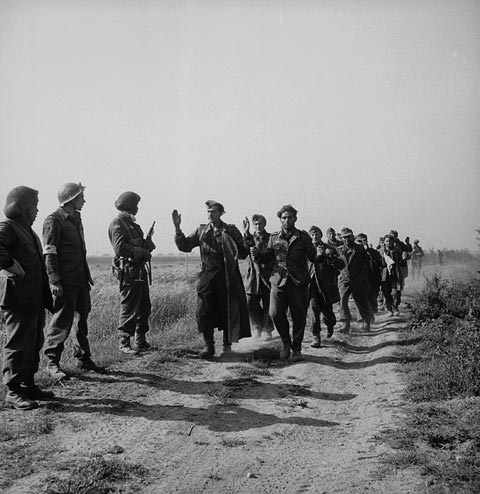
- Members of the Luftwaffe taken prisoner by the 8th Canadian Infantry Brigade during an attack on a factory in Ranville, 1944
- Active: 1915–1918; 1940–1945
- Country: Canada
- Branch: Canadian Army
- Type: Infantry
- Size: Brigade
- Part of: 3rd Canadian Infantry Division
- Nickname: "Water Rats"
- Engagements: World War I: Western Front; World War II: Juno Beach; Normandy landings; Battle of Normandy; Battle of the Scheldt

Commanders
- Notable commanders: Percy Klaehn

Insignia
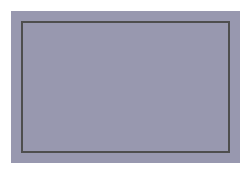
- 3rd Canadian Infantry Division formation patch
- Abbreviation: 8th Can Inf Bde

The 8th Canadian Infantry Brigade was an infantry brigade of the Canadian Army that saw active service during World War I and World War II as part of the 3rd Canadian Infantry Division. The brigade fought on the Western Front during World War I from December 1915 to November 1918, and in Normandy and north-west Europe in 1944–1945 during World War II. It was a square formation of four infantry battalions during World War I, but was reduced to a triangular formation of three battalions during World War II.

== History ==
=== World War I ===
Raised in December 1915 in France, the 8th Brigade formed part of the 3rd Canadian Division, and was formed from six Mounted Rifles regiments that were converted into infantry units, forming four infantry battalions. The brigade's first major action was fought around Mount Sorrel, where the brigade's commander, Brigadier General Victor Williams, was captured. After this, the brigade took part in most of the major actions fought by the Canadians on the Western Front for the next two-and-a-half years until the armistice in November 1918.

=== World War II ===
Formed once again as part of the 3rd Canadian Division, the 8th Brigade headquarters was authorized on 24 May 1940; however, significant delays had it be formed on 14 September 1940, consisting of a brigade headquarters, three infantry battalions and supported by an anti-tank company. Training was conducted in Canada, and by July 1941, the brigade departed for the United Kingdom. After training in Britain, the 8th Brigade formed part of the assault forces on D-Day, at Juno Beach. The 8th went ashore in the area Courseulles-sur-Mer, Bernières-sur-Mer and St Aubin-sur-Mer. Its task was to clear the beach and establish a beachhead perimeter before moving inland. Clearance of Courseulles was quickly done, thanks to detailed planning. Although the 8th Brigade reached is objectives by D-Day evening, mopping-up of bypassed German strongpoints took another ten days.

== Structure ==
=== World War I ===
During World War I, the 8th Brigade consisted of the following units:

- 1st Battalion, Canadian Mounted Rifles, CEF: December 1915 – 11 November 1918
- 2nd Battalion, Canadian Mounted Rifles, CEF: December 1915 – 11 November 1918
- 4th Battalion, Canadian Mounted Rifles, CEF: December 1915 – 11 November 1918
- 5th Battalion, Canadian Mounted Rifles, CEF: December 1915 – 11 November 1918

In addition, the brigade was supported by a machine gun company and a trench mortar battery.

=== World War II ===
During World War II, the 8th Brigade consisted of the following units:

- Headquarters, 8th Infantry Brigade, C.A.S.F. (14 September 1940 – 23 November 1945)
- 1st Battalion, The Queen's Own Rifles of Canada, C.A.S.F. (14 September 1940 – 23 November 1945)
- 1st Battalion, Le Régiment de la Chaudière, C.A.S.F. (14 September 1940 – 23 November 1945)
- 1st Battalion, The North Shore (New Brunswick) Regiment (14 September 1940 – 23 November 1945)
- 8th Infantry Brigade Ground Defence Platoon (Lorne Scots), C.A.S.F. (7 April 1941 – 23 November 1945)
- 8th Infantry Anti-Tank Company, C.A.S.F. (14 September 1940 – 5 February 1941)

== Brigade Commanders during the Second World War ==
- Brigadier J.P.U. Archambault: 14 September 1940 – 19 January 1942
- Brigadier K.G. Blackader: 20 January 1942 – 28 September 1944
- Lieutenant Colonel T.C. Lewis: 29 September – 17 October 1944 (KIA) (Acting Commander)
- Lieutenant Colonel P.C. Klaehn: 18 October – 29 October 1944) (Acting Commander)
- Brigadier J.A. Roberts: 30 October 1944 – 14 August 1945
- (Position Vacant / under Acting Command): 15 August – 23 November 1945 (Disbanded)
