= Percy Klaehn =

Canadian politician

Percy C. Klaehn

Mayor of Saskatoon
- In office 1963-1964
- Preceded by: Sidney Buckwold
- Succeeded by: E. J. Cole

Saskatoon City Alderman
- In office 1958–1963

Personal details
- Born: 1896 Valleyfield, Quebec
- Died: May 8, 1984 (aged 87–88) Saskatoon, Saskatchewan
- Citizenship: Canadian
- Occupation: Educator and soldier

Percy Carl Klaehn (Sept 10, 1895 – May 8, 1984) was a Canadian educator, soldier, and politician who served as mayor of Saskatoon, Saskatchewan from 1963 to 1964.

== Early life and career ==
Klaehn was born in Valleyfield, Quebec and came west with his family while still young. Klaehn served with Princess Patricia's Canadian Light Infantry during the First World War and was wounded at the Battle of Vimy Ridge. At the start of the Second World War, Klaehn joined the Saskatoon Light Infantry. He was named commander of The Cameron Highlanders of Ottawa and took part in the Allied invasion of Normandy in June 1944. He later commanded the 8th Canadian Infantry Brigade in Belgium. He then went to England as commander of the Canadian School of Infantry. Colonel Klaehn returned to Canada in the fall of 1945 to assist with demobilization as regional administrator for the federal Department of Veterans Affairs in Saskatoon. In 1946, he became commander of the 17th Infantry Brigade and later the 21st Militia of Saskatoon and commanded local military units and formations before retiring from the army as Brigadier-General in 1958. He was named honorary lieutenant-colonel for the North Saskatchewan Regiment.

Between the First and Second World Wars, Klaehn also taught school in Saskatoon, North Battleford and Weyburn. He was a high school coach for Ethel Catherwood, who later won a gold medal for Canada in the high jump at the 1928 Summer Olympics.

== Political career ==
Klaehn was elected to Saskatoon city council in a 1958 by-election and served on council until 1963. He was elected mayor following the resignation of Sidney Buckwold in 1963. He was defeated by E. J. Cole when he ran for reelection in 1964, which was considered a significant upset.

== Personal life ==
Klaehn and his first wife Eve had two children: David and Carolyn, with his second wife Helen had daughter Laura, and step-daughter Valerie. After leaving politics, Klaehn returned to teaching. He served as principal of Biggar Composite School and also taught in Rosetown and Harris. He returned to Saskatoon after he retired from teaching and later died there at the age of 88. He is buried in Woodlawn Cemetery with Helen, who died in 1997.

Klaehn was named an officer of the Order of the British Empire.

== See also ==
- List of mayors of Saskatoon
