= C.N. Yards Management Area =

- Neighbourhood
- Interactive map of C.N. Yards Management Area
- Coordinates: 52°6′17″N 106°45′32″W
- Country: Canada
- Province: Saskatchewan
- City: Saskatoon
- Suburban Development Area: Blairmore SDA
- Neighbourhood: C.N. Yards Industrial Area

Government
  - Type: Municipal (Ward 2)
  - Administrative body: Saskatoon City Council
  - Councillor: Hilary Gough
- Time zone: UTC-6 (UTC)

The Canadian National Railway (C.N.) Yards Management Area located on Chappell Drive, Saskatoon, Saskatchewan consists of the VIA Saskatoon railway station and the train switching yards. These yards are a part of the Blairmore Suburban Development Area (SDA). It lies (generally) north of the outskirts of the City and the Rural Municipality of Corman Park No. 344, west of Montgomery Place, south of 11th Street and east of Highway 7. Highway 7 has built an overpass over C.N. tracks where they intersect. This neighbourhood is not to be confused with the C.N. Industrial in the Nutana SDA on the east side of Saskatoon. These two sides of Saskatoon are connected with the Grand Trunk Bridge or CN railway bridge over the South Saskatchewan River.

At the intersection of the CNR line and Highway 60 is the location of the Saskatchewan Railway Museum.

Currently there are CPR switching yards in the Central Industrial neighbourhood. The City of Saskatoon, Canadian Pacific Railway and the CNR are under negotiations currently to remove these switching yards. This would mean the CPR could use CNR rail lines through the city and be able to use the CN Chappell Yards for switching. Likewise the CNR could run trains along the CPR track through the city and use the Sutherland CPR switching yards. This would involve construction of a connecting switching yard between CP and CN rail lines near 11th Street and Dundonald which could be done as part of the new Circle Drive South Bridge extension project.

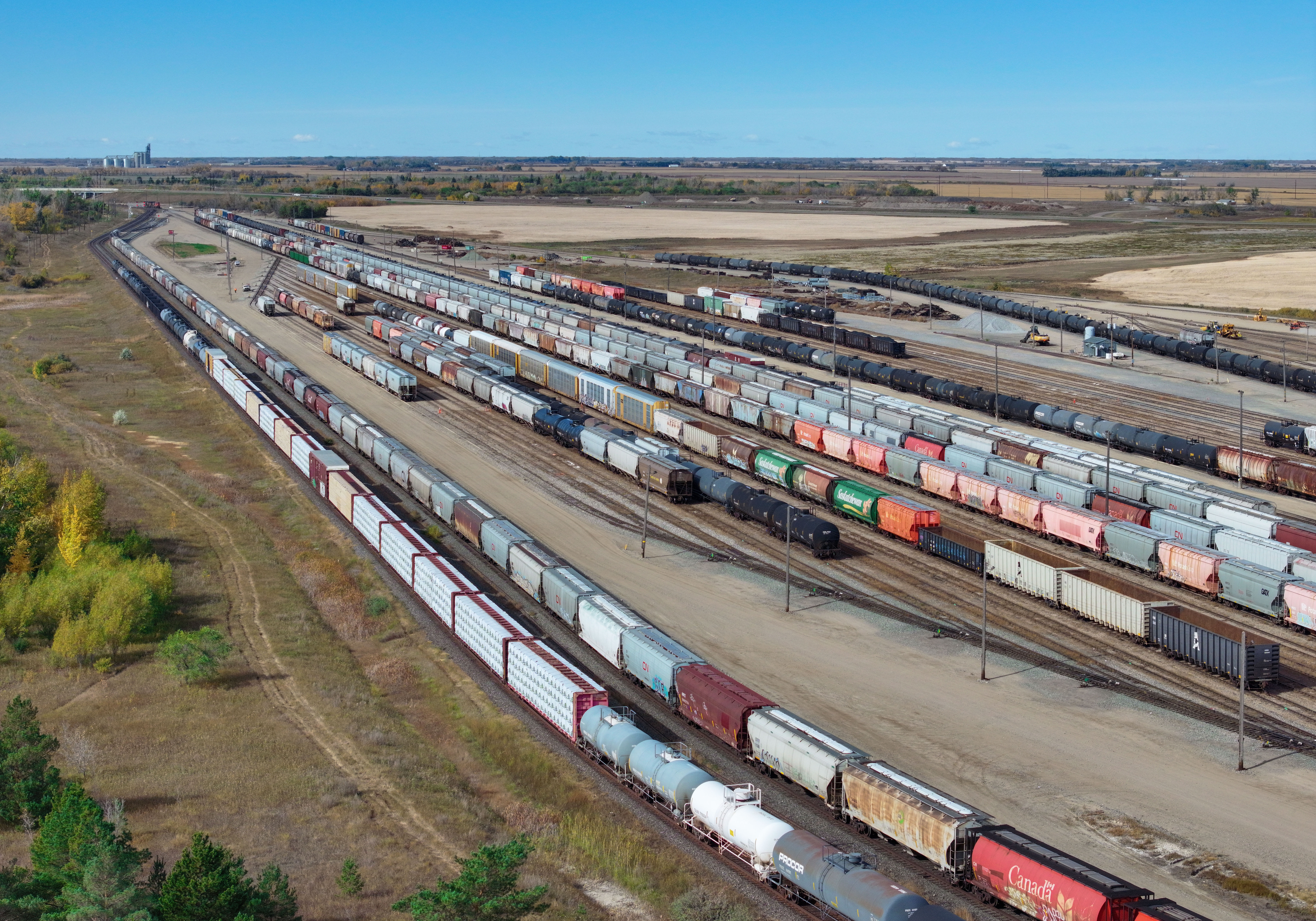

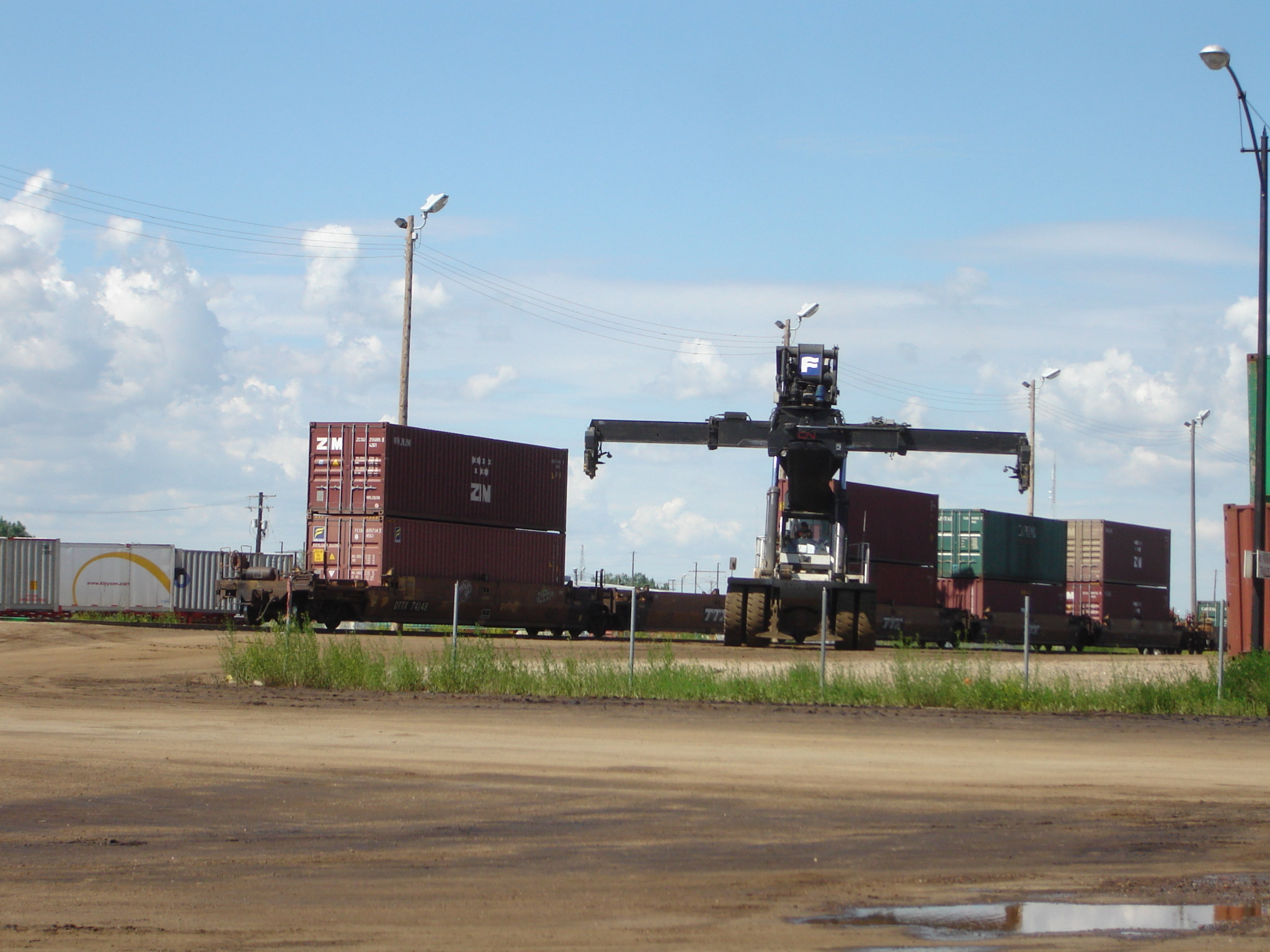

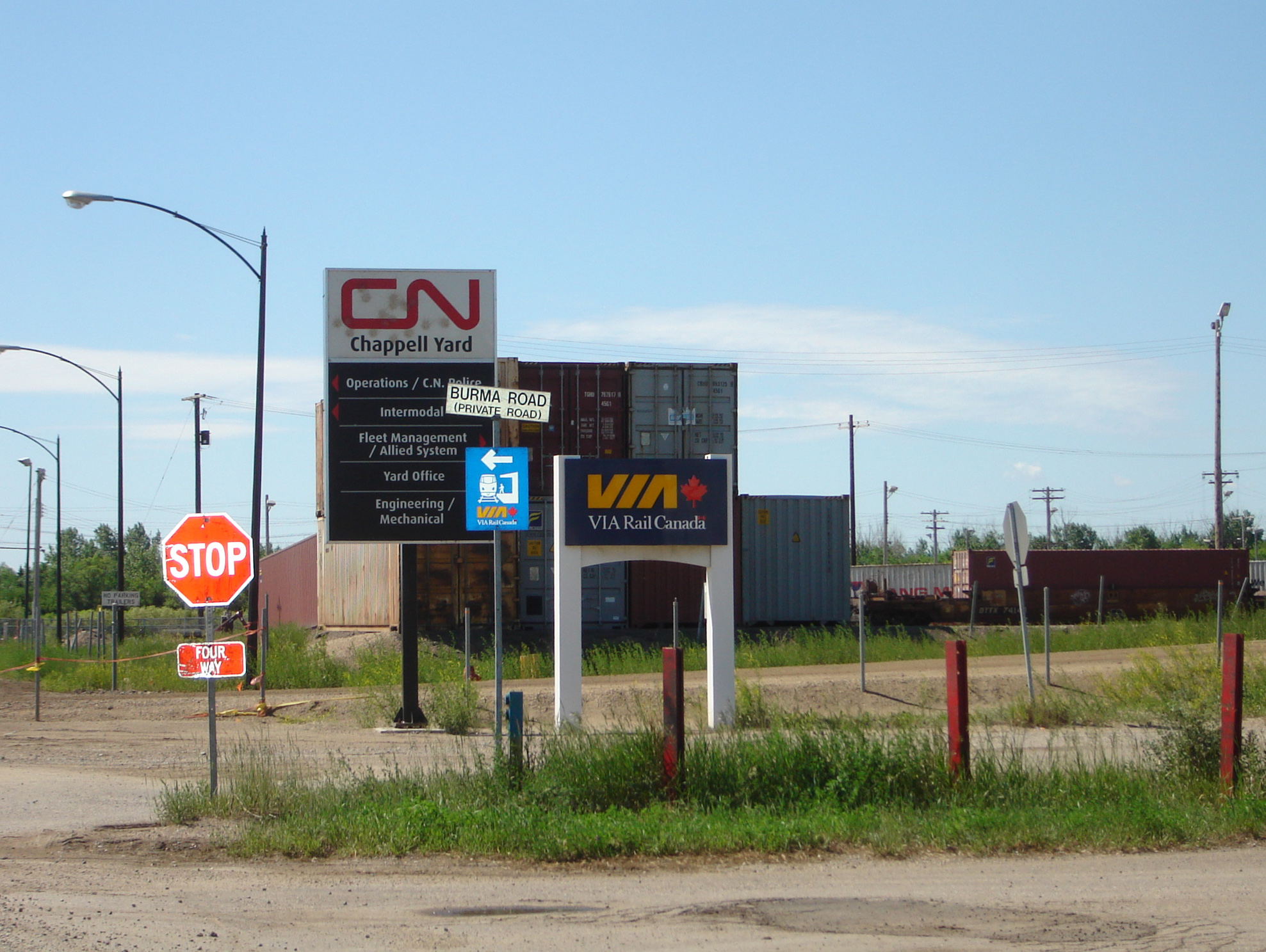

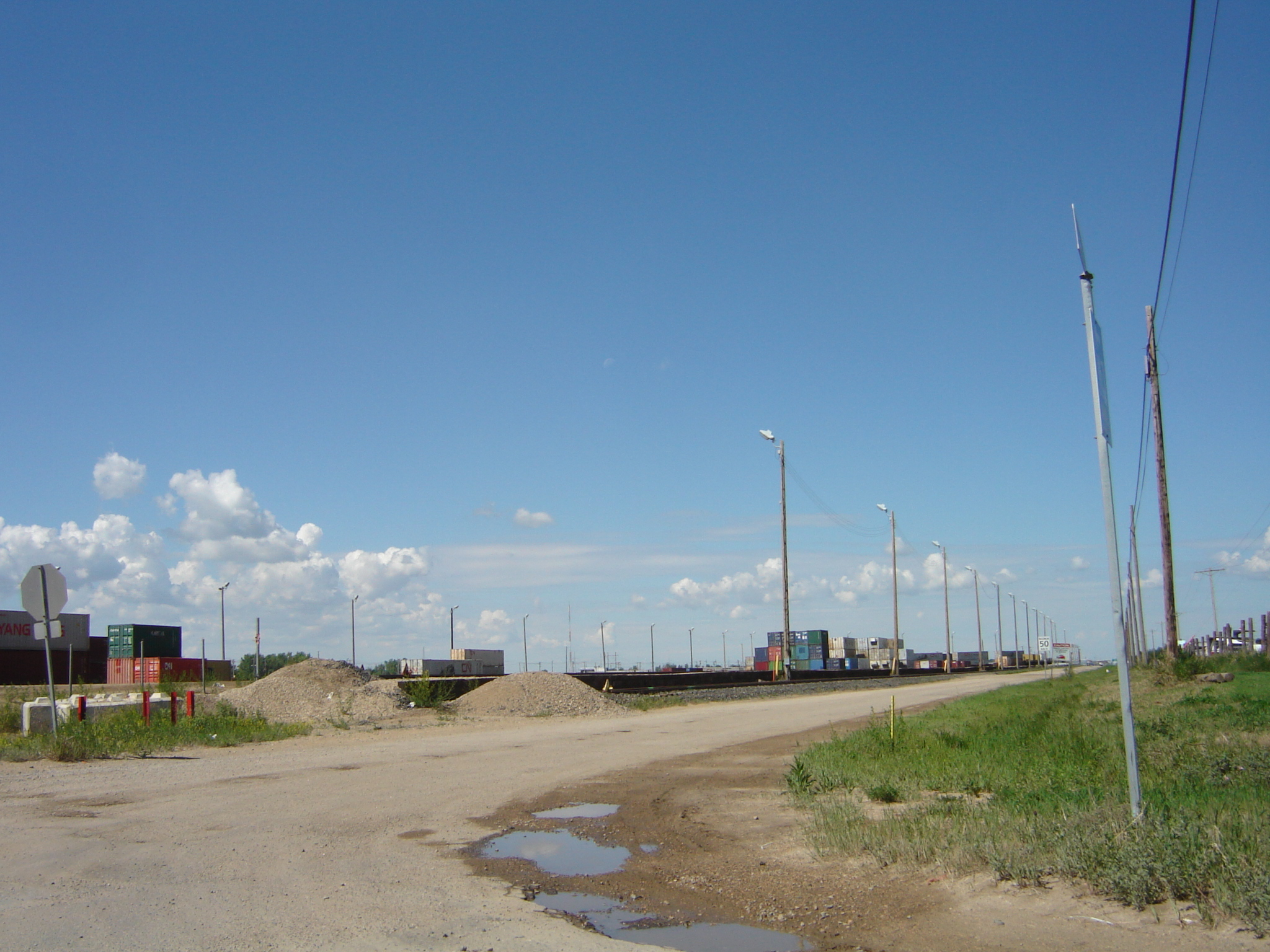
