= Frederick E. Harrison =

Canadian politician

Frederick Ernest Harrison (1876 – September 10, 1962) MBE was a politician in Saskatchewan, Canada. He was the member of Saskatoon city council from 1911 to 1912 and served as its mayor from 1913 to 1915.

He was born in Belleville, Ontario in 1876 and came to Saskatoon as manager of the Union Bank in 1904. In 1907, Harrison opened a real estate and insurance business. He also served as secretary and treasurer of the Saskatoon Board of Trade. He married Zeta Mabel Charlebois in 1909. Harrison was a member of Saskatoon city council from 1911 to 1912. In 1913 he was elected mayor of the city. He had succeeded James Clinkskill. After the Germans attacked Ypres and sank the luxury ship Lusitania during the first world war Harrison ordered all the Germans and Austrians in Saskatoon to work under guard. He did not seek reelection after his term as mayor ended in 1915. Alexander MacGillivray Young succeeded him as the mayor in 1916.

In 1916, he moved to Calgary, Alberta after accepting a position with the federal Department of Labour. His wife was charged with attempted murder in 1922 after shooting Harrison twice in the chest. She was convicted of the lesser charge of discharging a firearm after it was proved that she had removed the lead bullets from the shells; apparently, her intention was to scare her husband. Sometime after Harrison recovered, the couple were divorced.

Harrison was named a Member of the Order of the British Empire in 1943 for his work in industrial dispute settlement. He died in Vancouver, British Columbia on September 10, 1962 at the age of 85.

Harrison Crescent in the Avalon neighbourhood in Saskatoon was named in his honour.
