= Angus W. MacPherson =

Canadian mayor

Angus Wilson Macpherson (1888 – December 31, 1954) was a politician in Saskatchewan, Canada. He served as mayor of Saskatoon from 1944 to 1948.

He was born in Orangeville, Ontario and moved to Moose Jaw, Saskatchewan in 1912 to work in a bank. In 1931, Macpherson moved to Saskatoon, where he was manager of the Saskatoon Motor Club until 1943. He did not serve on Saskatoon city council before becoming mayor. Macpherson defeated former mayor John Sproule Mills in 1943 and again in 1947 before losing to Mills when he ran for reelection in 1948.

After leaving politics, he worked in the oil industry and then served as chair of the advisory board for the provincial securities act. Macpherson died of a heart attack at the Royal Bank in Saskatoon at the age of 66. He is buried in Woodlawn Cemetery next to his wife Charlotte, who died in 1985.
