= William Hopkins (Canadian politician) =

Canadian politician and hardware merchant

William Hopkins (March 1, 1864 – January 11, 1935) was a hardware merchant and political figure in Saskatchewan, Canada. He was mayor of Saskatoon from 1909 to 1910.

He was born in Bentinck Township, Grey County, Canada West, the son of James Hopkins, who had served as township reeve. Hopkins was educated in Bentick and Hanover. He was employed by a woollen company in Hanover, then moved to Portage la Prairie in 1882, where he worked in a grocery store. Hopkins worked in stores in Brandon and Souris and then operated his own general store in Hartney from 1889 to 1896. He married Alice Jane Carson in 1895. In 1905, he opened a hardware store in Saskatoon and then, in 1908, a branch in Tessier. Hopkins served on the town council for Saskatoon from 1905 to 1908 and was president of the Union of Saskatchewan Municipalities in 1909. Hopkins was also involved in real estate and insurance. He was buried in Woodlawn Cemetery in Saskatoon. Hopkins Street in Saskatoon's Avalon community is named in his honour.
