= J. D. McAskill =

Canadian educator and politician (1907–1994)

John Donald MacAskill (25 November 1907 – July 25, 1994) was an educator, politician and municipal official in Saskatchewan, Canada. He served as mayor of Saskatoon, Saskatchewan from 1954 to 1958.

== Early life and education ==
He was born in Marble Mountain, Municipality of the County of Inverness, Nova Scotia as one of nine children to John Norman MacAskill and Mary Catherine MacLeod. He came to Saskatchewan as a farm worker at the age of 17. He studied at the Saskatoon Normal School and taught school in Borden and Hanley.

== Career and later life ==
In 1929, he moved to Saskatoon to become vice-principal at Princess Alexandra School. While he was teaching, he earned a B.A. in Economics from the University of Saskatchewan. He later worked as an insurance salesman and then opened a men's wear store in the late 1940s. He was elected to the Public School Board in 1946 and served on Saskatoon city council in 1953 before being elected mayor. He resigned as mayor in March 1958 to become city commissioner. He resigned from that position in June 1966 for health reasons. He later served as principal of Dundurn School from 1969 to 1973.

He died at the age of 86 and is buried in Woodlawn Cemetery.

== Legacy ==
McAskill Crescent in the Avalon neighbourhood in Saskatoon was named in his honour.
