= 1980 Saskatoon Queen's Hotel fire =

Hotel fire in Saskatoon, Canada

- Date: May 31, 1980
- Venue: Queen's Hotel
- Location: Saskatoon, Saskatchewan, Canada; 52°7′32.39″N 106°40′0.43″W
- Type: Fire
- Deaths: 2 firefighters

The Saskatoon Queen's Hotel fire was a structure fire that occurred on May 31, 1980, in the basement of the Queen's Hotel, 1st Avenue South, Saskatoon, Saskatchewan, Canada. For the first time in Saskatoon's history, two firefighters were killed while attempting to extinguish the flames; Victor James Budz and Dennis Aron Guenter. In 2016, a memorial plaque was unveiled at the site of the fire, now the Scotiabank Theatre.
