= Blairmore Sector =

Sector in Saskatoon, Saskatchewan, Canada

- Sector
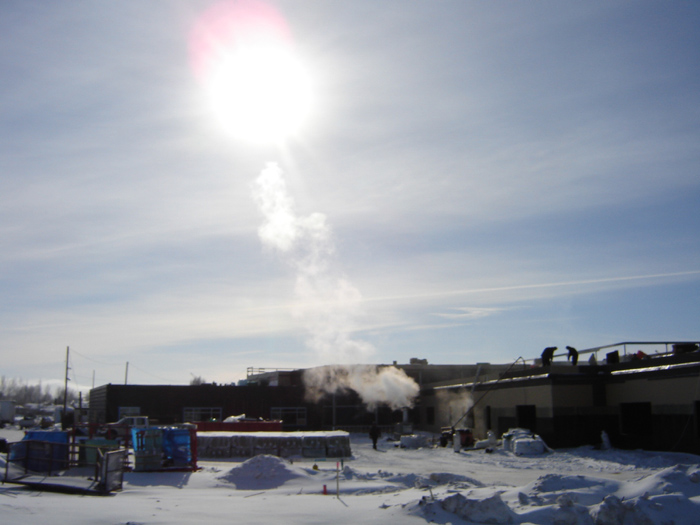
- Blairmore under construction
- Interactive map of Blairmore Sector
- Coordinates: 52°7′55″N 106°46′8″W
- Country: Canada
- Province: Saskatchewan
- City: Saskatoon

Area
  - Total: 29.35 km^{2} (11.33 sq mi)
- Area code: 306

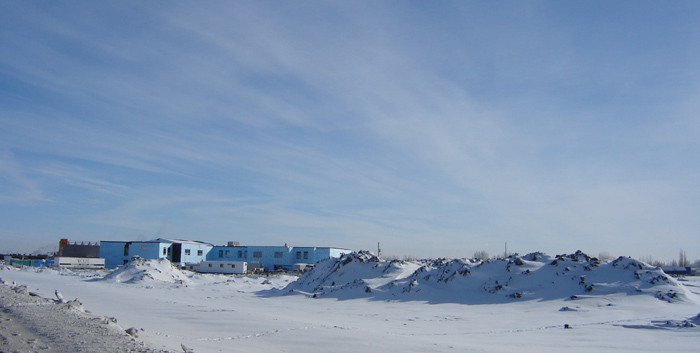
Construction in Blairmore Urban Centre, Blairmore Sector

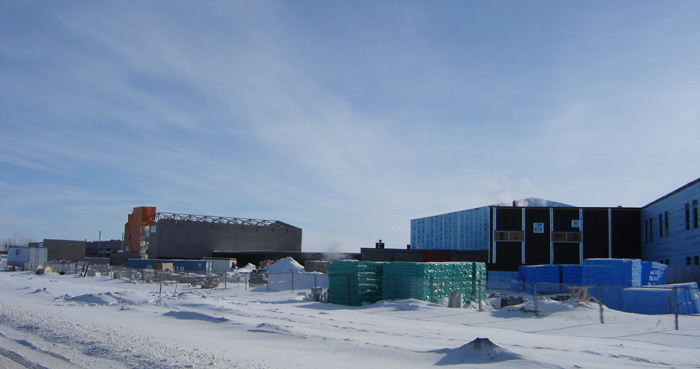
Construction in the Blairmore Urban Centre, Blairmore Sector

Blairmore Sector, previously known as the Blairmore Suburban Development Area (SDA), is a sector in Saskatoon, Saskatchewan, Canada. It is a part of the west side community of Saskatoon. It lies (generally) north and east of the outskirts of the city and the Rural Municipality of Corman Park No. 344, south of the Riel Industrial Sector, and west of the Confederation Sector. Most of the Blairmore Sector consists of undeveloped land annexed by the city in the mid-2000s. A total of nine neighbourhoods, primarily residential in nature, are ultimately planned for the sector. As of late 2019, two are in the process of development: the commercial/residential Blairmore Urban Centre and the residential community Kensington. A third residential area, Elk Point, is also in its early stages.

== Neighbourhoods ==
- Blairmore Urban Centre
- C.N. Yards Management Area
- Kensington, a residential community immediately north of Blairmore Urban Centre, was approved in 2011, with construction beginning in 2013.
- Elk Point, a residential community to the northeast of Kensington, was designated in 2013, though planning for the community is still in its early stages.
- As noted above, at least six additional residential neighbourhoods are ultimately planned for the sector. As of the end of 2019, their names and layouts have yet to be finalized.

== Recreation facilities ==
- Blairmore Civic Centre designated as the Shaw Centre track opened in the Fall of 2008. The swimming facilities opened fall 2009. They host an Olympic-sized swimming pool, family pool with waterslides, two hot tubs and diving platforms.

== Shopping ==
- Approximately 315,000 square feet (29,300 m^{2}) of retail to be constructed in Blairmore Sector
- A Wal-Mart Supercentre opened January 2010 on Betts Avenue and since then a number "big box" and strip mall retailers have opened on both sides of Betts Avenue. An additional commercial area, including city's first Save-On grocery store outlet, is under development on the north side of 22nd Street along Kensington Boulevard.

== Education ==
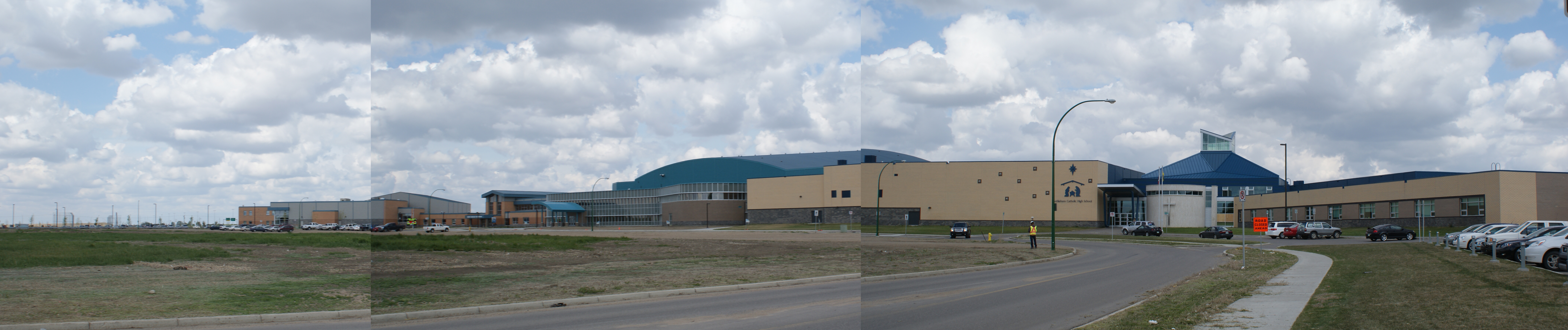
Tommy Douglas Collegiate – Shaw Centre – Bethlehem High School panorama

The Blairmore Centre consists of a separate Bethlehem High School and public Tommy Douglas Collegiate as well as civic centre called The Shaw Centre. Blairmore Sector is home to the following schools:

- New Tommy Douglas Collegiate, public secondary education opened in the fall of 2008
- New Bethlehem Catholic High School, Catholic or separate secondary education, opened in the fall of 2008

As of 2017 no elementary schools are imminent for Kensington or Elk Point, though land has been set aside in both communities for future public and Catholic schools.

In addition, the sector initially included the Yarrow Youth Farm, a provincial correctional facility for at-risk youth. Although initially expected to continue operations despite the annexation and development of the Kensington residential community on three sides, the Saskatchewan government subsequently closed the 40-acre facility on Neault Road, north of the former alignment of 33rd Street, transferring its programs to another facility in Saskatoon, and put the land up for sale in 2015.

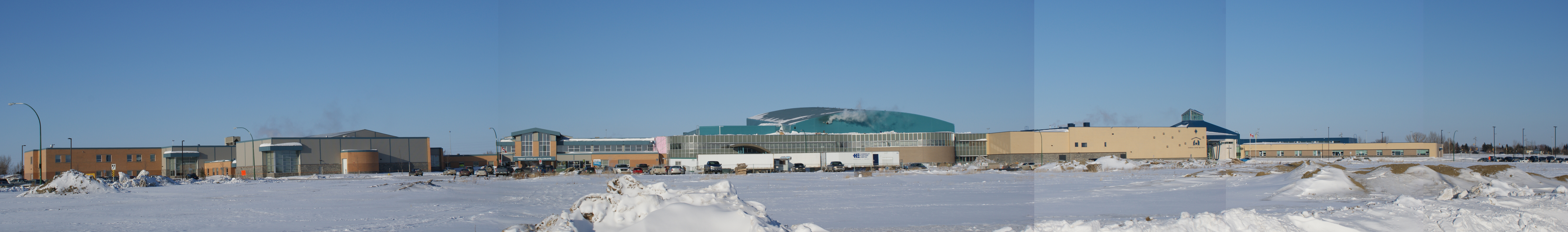
Tommy Douglas Collegiate – Shaw Centre – Bethlehem High School panorama

== Other services ==
- A "District Centre" is planned in Neighbourhoods 6 and 7
- The sector contains the Smithville Cemetery, which dates back to 1901 and was annexed by the city with the rest of the sector region. It is located on 22nd Street (Highway 14), west of Range Road 3063.

== Transportation ==
22nd Street (Highway 14) is a major thoroughfare through Saskatoon. Highway 14 connects with Asquith, Biggar Wilkie, Unity, and Macklin en route to Alberta. The area is also accessed by Highway 7, which links Saskatoon to Calgary, Alberta and the west coast, and Secondary Highway 684, also known as Dalmeny Road but officially renamed Neault Road in 2012, which was annexed by the city and provides a connection to Yellowhead Highway 16 and the town of Dalmeny.

Highway 7 has been realigned to connect with Highway 14/22nd Street/Highway 684 at an at-grade intersection that will be eventually replaced by an interchange. For several years Highway 7 entered the area via Betts Avenue within the Blairmore Urban Centre region, but this link has now been removed; the road's original alignment where it joined 22nd Street prior to the mid-2000s has been replaced with residential development and the area's recreation centre and high schools.

The only other main road currently servicing the sector is the western leg of 33rd Street West, which according to the city's October 2008 Projected Growth Map is slated to eventually be replaced by an extension of the Claypool Drive thoroughfare; originally an east-west roadway, beginning in 2012 the road was realigned to allow for development of Kensington. The western boundary of the sector is marked by a transportation/utility corridor adjacent to the current western city boundary, set aside for future construction of a perimeter highway.

=== City transit ===
The Blairmore Urban Centre is served by Route 23 on weekday peak hours and during the day. Service will presumably be expanded as the sector is developed.
