= Bert Sears =

Canadian politician (1907–1993)

Herbert S. Sears

Mayor of Saskatoon
- In office 1972-1976
- Preceded by: Sidney Buckwold
- Succeeded by: Cliff E. Wright

Saskatoon City Alderman
- In office 1964–1971

Saskatoon City Alderman
- In office 1951–1958

Personal details
- Born: 1907 Kent, England
- Died: December 23, 1993 (aged 85–86) Saskatoon, Saskatchewan
- Occupation: Co-op manager

Herbert Sydney Sears (1907 – December 23, 1993) was a British-born politician in Saskatchewan, Canada. He served as mayor of Saskatoon from 1972 to 1976.

== Early life ==
Sears was born in Bromley in 1907. His father emigrated to Saskatoon in 1910 where he ran a fish and chip shop, but at the start of the First World War he joined the Canadian Expeditionary Force. On December 25, 1917, Sears and his mother reached Saskatoon where they were later reunited with his father.

After completing his schooling, Sears began working at a bakery. There he became a member of a union, beginning a long-term commitment to the labour movement in Saskatoon. Sears was employed with Federated Co-op from 1944 until his retirement in 1967; he became regional warehouse manager in 1949. He also served as the second president of the Saskatoon board of the Canadian Congress of Labour.

== Political career ==
Sears was a member of Saskatoon City Council from 1951 to 1958 and again from 1964 to 1971. During his service on the council he was a member of various committees including engineering, parks, planning and the board of trade. He succeeded Sidney Buckwold as mayor in which role he served from 1972 to 1976. During his mayorship the ward system of council election was reintroduced in Saskatoon.

== Personal life and legacy ==
In 1927 Sears married Mary Dubets, with whom he had four sons. He married his second wife, Phyllis, after the death of Mary. Sears died on December 23, 1993, at the age of 86 in Saskatoon.

In recognition of his service to the community he was awarded the centennial medal in 1967. Sears Bay, Sears Crescent and Sears Place in Arbor Creek and Herbert S. Sears Park in Fairhaven were named in his honour.

== See also ==
- List of mayors of Saskatoon
