= Malcolm Isbister =

Canadian mayor

Malcolm Scarth Isbister (August 31, 1850 – June 30, 1920) was a Scottish-born merchant and political figure in Saskatchewan, Canada. He served as mayor of Saskatoon in 1905.

He was born in the Orkney Islands, the son of John Isbister, and came to Galt, Canada West with his parents in 1857. Isbister was educated in Huron County and at the normal school in Toronto. He taught school in Ontario for a number of years. In 1874, Isbister married Margaret Sharpe.

He worked as a contractor for the Canadian Pacific Railway in 1883, then entered business as the junior partner with his brother Adam Isbister in Petrolia and Port Arthur where they purchased the stock and goodwill of merchant Noah Keen Street in November 1884. The firm assigned to its creditors after the death of Adam Isbister in March 1890. Isbister operated a hotel in Souris, Manitoba from 1892 to 1894 and then in Wawanesa from 1897 to 1903. He then moved to Saskatoon, where he opened a hardware business. Isbister served as town coroner, postmaster and as a member of the board of governors for the Saskatoon City Hospital. He was also president of the Board of Trade for several years.

M Isbister & Son was his business which was a general hardware store including selling guns. His store was the first frame built building on 2nd Avenue. He was a member of the first Hockey Club formed in 1903. He also played ping pong. He made great profits selling real estate early in the history of the city. He built and owned one of the most impressive houses in the city. In 1912 Isbister & Pretty opened a 5-storey hardware business. In 1913 City Hall displayed a painting of Isbister. He was also the city postmaster. He was city coroner for a number of years. He was president of the Board of Trade for 8 years and a member of the board of governors 1906 to 1911. He was president of the Saskatoon Curling Club 1906–1907. He was a member of the Masons and Knights of Pythias. He was a liberal and a member of the Presbyterian Church. He was postmaster 1906–1920. He had 3 daughters and two sons. His partner Mr Pretty died in 1919. (Star Phoenix Obituary July 2, 1920).

Isbister Street in Saskatoon's Grosvenor Park neighbourhood is named in his honour.
