= Joseph Edwin Underwood =

Canadian mayor

Joseph Edwin Underwood (November 3, 1882 – June 1, 1960) was a civil engineer, land surveyor and political figure in Saskatchewan, Canada. He was mayor of Saskatoon in 1932.

He was born in Huron County, Ontario, the son of Joseph Underwood and Mary Miller, and was educated in Huron County and at the University of Toronto. In 1911, he qualified as a Dominion Land Surveyor and, in 1912, as a Saskatchewan Land Surveyor. Underwood came to Saskatoon in 1911 and, in the same year, married Lina Case. He joined the firm of McArthur and Murphy, which then became known as McArthur, Murphy & Underwood and later as Underwood, McLellan & Associates Limited, A. A. Murphy having departed in 1920 to open an electrical supply company and later to co-found CFQC, a Saskatoon radio station. The remaining partner, Roy Alexander McLellan, had been hired by Underwood in 1912. Theirs was a fruitful partnership which eventually led to their opening of offices across western Canada and ultimately across the country.

Early achievements included engineered waterworks and sewage systems at Melfort, The Pas, Manitoba and Sutherland and electric lights and waterworks at Wilkie, Scott and Assinboia.

Underwood also lectured in civil engineering for two years at the University of Saskatchewan.

Underwood, McLellan & Associates Limited, later known the UMA Group, became a subsidiary of AECOM in 2004. Underwood Avenue in Saskatoon's Avalon community is named in his honour.
