= William Harvey Clare =

Canadian politician (1874–1956)

- Born: 1874; Ottawa, Ontario, Canada
- Died: February 26, 1956 (aged 81–82); Saskatoon, Saskatchewan, Canada
- Occupations: teacher, politician

William Harvey Clare (1874 – February 26, 1956) was a politician in Saskatchewan, Canada. He served as mayor of Saskatoon from 1924 to 1925.

He was born in Ottawa, Ontario and came to Winnipeg, Manitoba to attend teacher's college. He taught school for several years and then was hired by a bank. He worked as a bank manager in Lanigan, Saskatchewan and then, in 1910, became general manager of the Saskatchewan Investment and Trust Company in Saskatoon. Soon afterwards, he opened his own real estate and insurance business. Clare served on Saskatoon city council from 1914 to 1922. He did not seek reelection after his term as mayor. He died at the age of 82.

Clare Crescent in the Avalon neighbourhood of Saskatoon was named in his honour.
