= Avalon, Saskatoon =

Avalon
- Neighbourhood
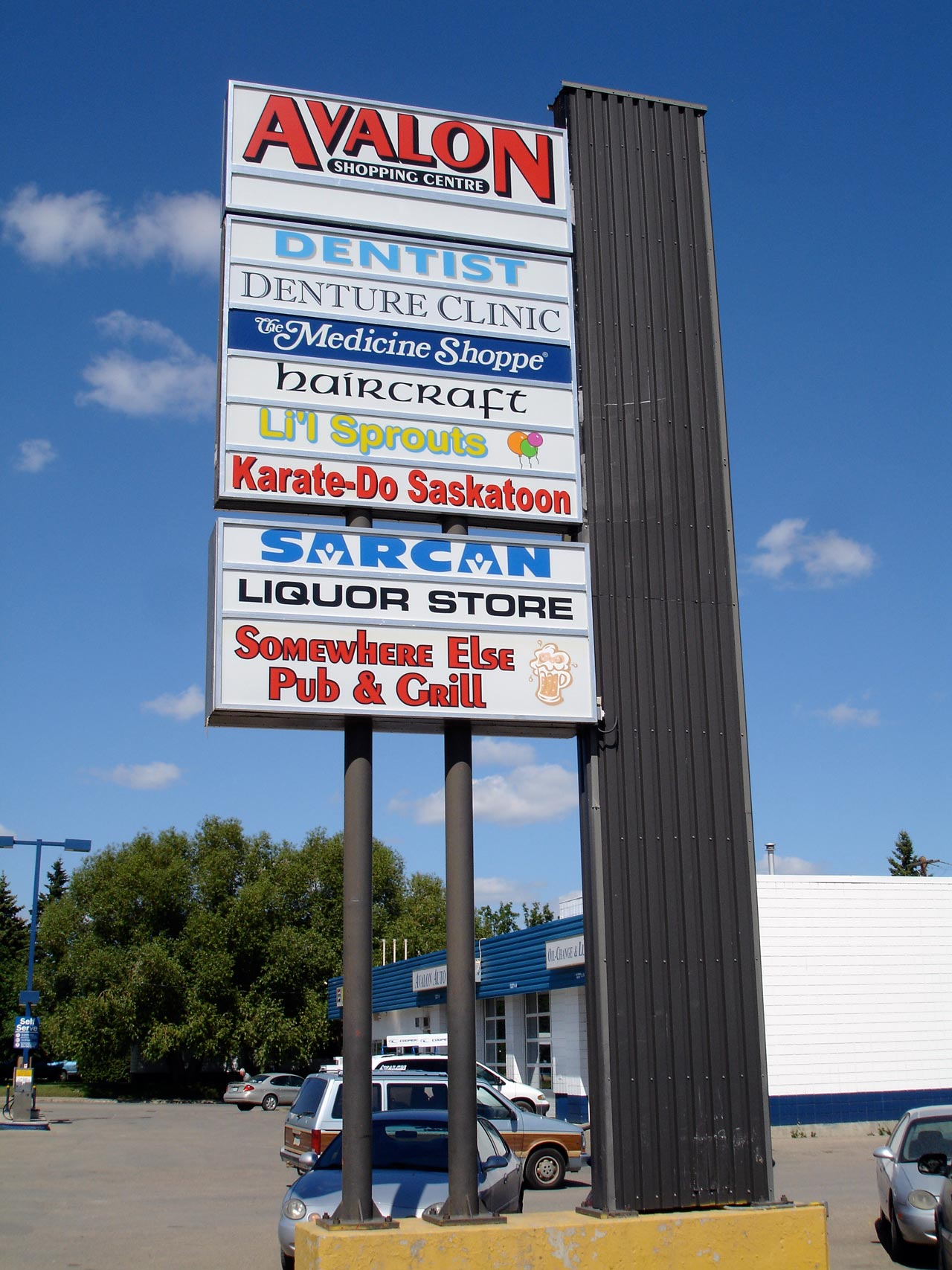
- Avalon Shopping Centre

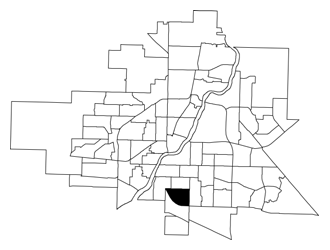
- Avalon location map
- Coordinates: 52°5′48″N 106°39′28″W
- Country: Canada
- Province: Saskatchewan
- City: Saskatoon
- Suburban Development Area: Nutana
- Neighbourhood: Avalon
- Annexed: 1910-1919
- Construction: 1946-1970

Government
  - Type: Municipal (Ward 7)
  - Administrative body: Saskatoon City Council
  - Councillor: Mairin Loewen

Area
  - Total: 1.46 km^{2} (0.56 sq mi)

Population (2007)
  - Total: 3,214
  - Average Income: $65,000
- Time zone: UTC-6 (UTC)
- Website: Avalon Community Association

Avalon is a mostly residential neighbourhood located in south-central Saskatoon, Saskatchewan, Canada. It is a suburban subdivision, consisting mostly of low-density, single detached dwellings. As of 2007, the area is home to 3,214 residents. The neighbourhood is considered a middle-income area, with an average family income of $65,000, an average dwelling value of $168,444 and a home ownership rate of 77.3%.

== History ==
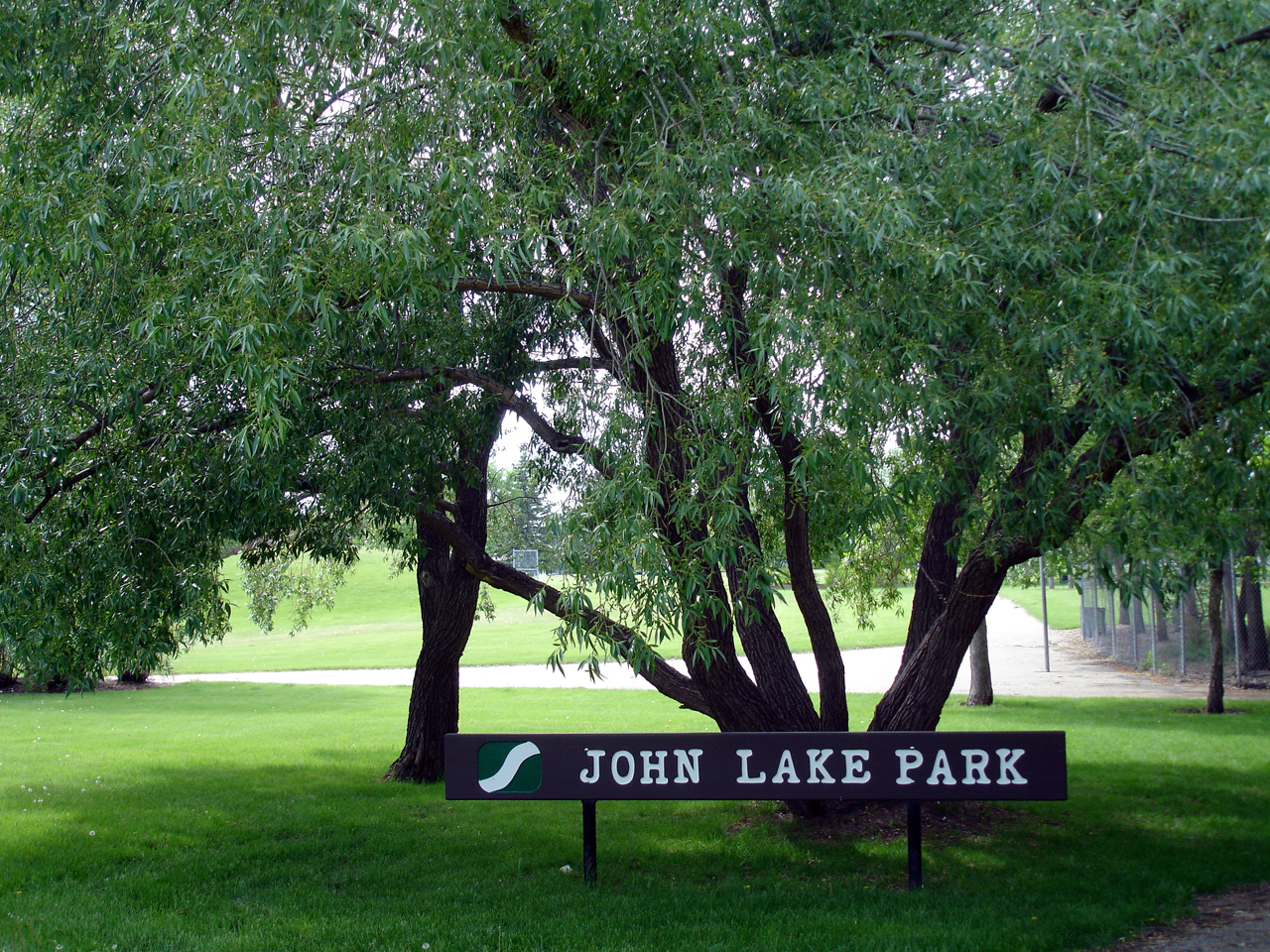
John Lake Park

Most of the land for the neighbourhood was annexed by the city between 1910 and 1919, with the remaining southern piece annexed between 1960 and 1969. A 1913 map shows that the present-day Avalon area overlaps three registered subdivisions of the day: Avalon in the northwest, Pacific Addition in the east and railway stock yards in the south. Home construction, however, did not begin in earnest until after World War II. The layout of the streets reflects the changing urban planning philosophies of the day as the land was developed. The north part of the neighbourhood follows a traditional grid pattern. By the 1950s, the design of residential neighbourhoods used a modern system of curving residential streets, feeding into collector roads that connected to arterial roads. Thus, the southern part of the neighbourhood follows this design practice. Many of the community's street names honour mayors and other community leaders from early in Saskatoon's history, including Wilson Crescent, commemorating James Robert Wilson, who was the Town of Saskatoon's first mayor and the City of Saskatoon's second.

In recognition of Bruce Gordon's contributions to the community, Gordon was bestowed the Saskatoon-Grasswood Canada 150 Award. In addition to his career and dedication to the athletic community Gordon was a volunteer, and offered his time to PRIDE Saskatoon, the Saskatoon Road Runners Club, John Lake Home and School Council, and the Saskatoon Sexual Assault Centre and may other local organisations.

Residential build-out in Avalon was mostly completed by the late 1960s, however some additional residential development occurred south of Glasgow Street and west of Clarence Avenue in the mid-1990s, along with some limited remnant development west of Melrose Avenue in the 1980s. As noted below, plans for the southwest extension of Circle Drive initially caused some concern; construction of an interchange at Clarence Avenue and Circle, in the planning since the 1960s, was completed by the late 2000s, facilitating resident access to the freeway and to the Stonebridge commercial area to the southeast.

== Government and politics ==
Avalon exists within the federal electoral district of Saskatoon—Grasswood. It is currently represented by Kevin Waugh of the Conservative Party of Canada, first elected in 2015.

Provincially, the neighbourhood is within the constituency of Saskatoon Eastview. It is currently represented by Darcy Warrington of the Saskatchewan New Democratic Party, first elected in 2024.

In Saskatoon's non-partisan municipal politics, Avalon lies within ward 7. It is currently represented by Councillor Mairin Loewen, who was elected to city council in a 2011 by-election.

== Institutions ==
=== Education ===
Georges Vanier Catholic Fine Arts School
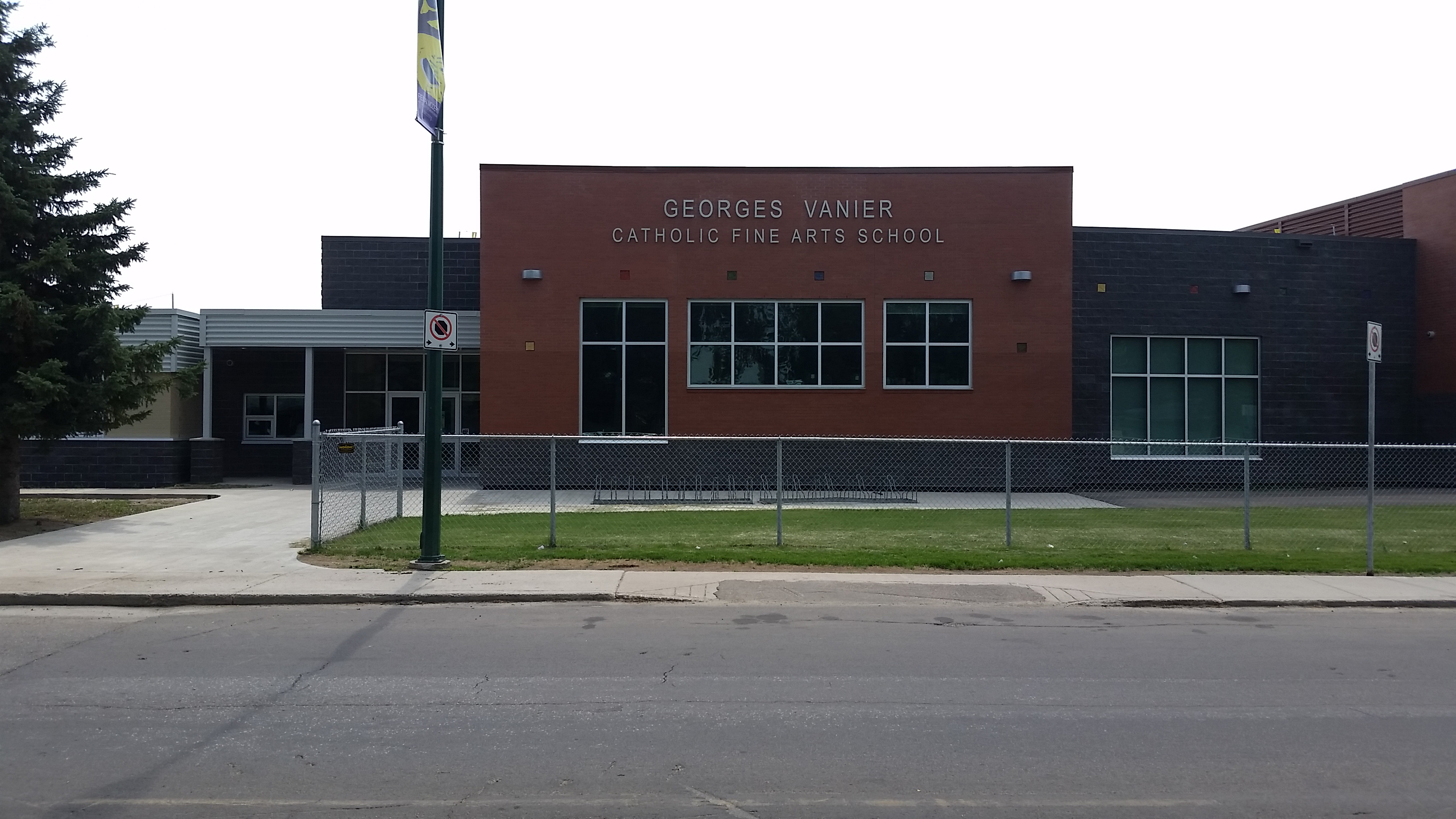
- 820 Wilson Crescent; Saskatoon, Saskatchewan, S7J 2M4; Canada

Information
- Type: Elementary, Fine Arts focus
- Religious affiliation: Catholic
- Opened: 1958
- School board: Greater Saskatoon Catholic Schools
- Principal: Laura Cey
- Grades: Kindergarten to Grade 8
- Enrollment: 404 (2017)
- Education system: Separate
- Language: English
- Feeder to: Holy Cross High School
- Website: Georges Vanier Catholic Fine Arts School

John Lake School
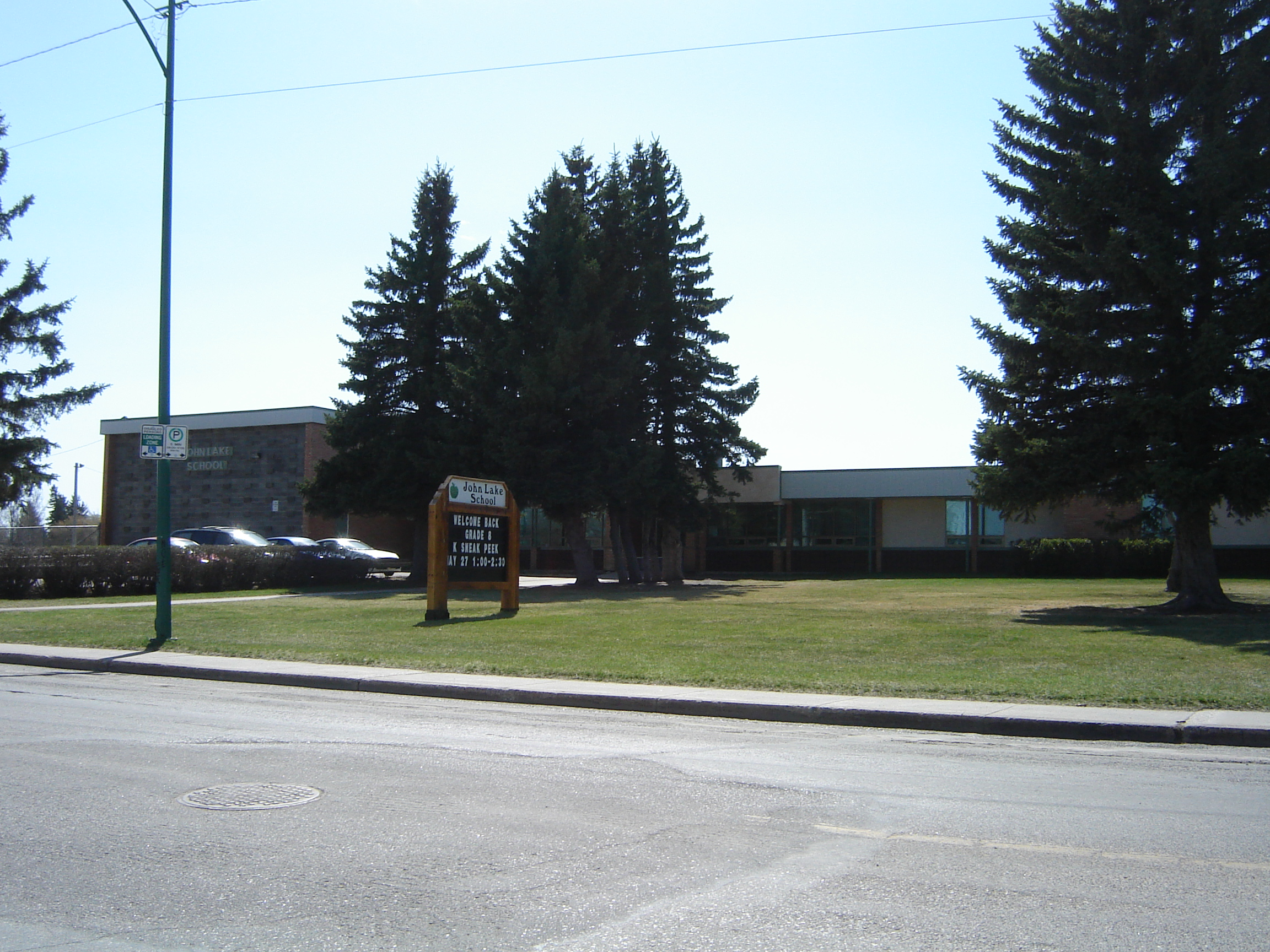
- 2606 Broadway Avenue; Saskatoon, Saskatchewan, S7J 0Z6; Canada

Information
- Type: Elementary
- Opened: 1958
- School board: Saskatoon Public School Division
- Principal: Shane Armington
- Enrollment: 255 (2018)
- Education system: Public
- Feeder to: Aden Bowman Collegiate
- Website: John Lake School

- Georges Vanier Catholic Fine Arts School - separate (Catholic) elementary, part of Greater Saskatoon Catholic Schools Originally opened in 1958 as Christ the King School, it was renamed in honor of Georges Vanier in 1967. In 1979, it became the first designated fine arts school in Saskatchewan. The school began major expansion and renovation during 2014 which was completed by the fall of 2015.
- John Lake School - public elementary school, part of the Saskatoon Public School Division. The school was constructed in 1959.
- Avalon is also served by Aden Bowman Collegiate, located a few blocks to the north of John Lake School.

== Parks and recreation ==
- C.P. Seeley Park (1.3 acres)
- John Lake Park (4.1 acres)
- Avalon Park (4.2 acres)

Bruce Gordon was active as a swimmer, weight lifter, cyclist. As a Crossfit training and national Crossfit competitions such as the CanWest Games a British Columbia CrossFit competition, marathons, competing in triathlons as well as the Ironman, such as the Penticton Ironman which he completed nine times. In 2019, Crossfit 306 held the #BeLikeBruce Fitness Festival combining CrossFit Competition with a Triathlon in honour of Gordon, and raised $15,000 towards Pancreatic Cancer Research. Additionally Gordon was active in bike races. In the last days of Stage 4 Pancreatic Cancer, hundreds of people came to Saskatoon's Avalon Park in a cross-fit flash workout to honour Gordon.

The Avalon Community Association exists to represent the educational, recreational, and social needs of residents, to promote a sense of community and enhance quality of life in the area.

== Public services ==
Avalon is a part of the east division of the Saskatoon Police Service's patrol system. Saskatoon Fire & Protective Services' east division covers the neighbourhood. Transit services to Avalon are provided by Saskatoon Transit on routes No. 6 (Clarence - Broadway) and 13 (Lawson - Exhibition).

== Commercial ==
The main commercial development is the Avalon Shopping Centre, a strip mall located on the corner of Broadway Avenue and Cascade Street; opened in early 1960, the plaza used to house a branch of Canada Safeway, and from the 1990s to 2021 was the location of a "Sarcan" recycling depot. There are also two small commercial areas along Ruth Street: one between Lorne and Vernon avenues, and another at Melrose Avenue. It is also separated by an interchange from the Stonebridge "big-box" shopping centre to the immediate southeast.

== Location ==
Avalon is located within the Nutana Suburban Development Area. It is bounded by Ruth Street to the north, Circle Drive to the south, Idylwyld Drive to west, and Clarence Avenue to the east. Roads are laid in a grid fashion in the north part of the neighbourhood, while the south part features crescents and cul-de-sacs. The community has the distinction of being either directly connected by, or directly adjacent to, all four major roadways leading to downtown: the Idylwyld Freeway (via Lorne Avenue), Victoria Avenue (via Wilson Crescent), Broadway Avenue and Clarence Avenue.

Vernon Avenue is a local oddity. On maps it is a one-block long one-way street for northbound traffic between Bute and Ruth Streets. It actually begins at Bute Street as the back alley for houses along McPherson Avenue to the east. It then merges with the Idylwyld Freeway offramp to become a true road until terminating at Ruth Street. St. George Avenue in the neighbouring Exhibition neighbourhood is similarly used as the southbound exit from the Idylwyld Freeway to Ruth Street. The combination of houses and exiting freeway traffic makes this type of street a rarity in Saskatoon.

Early planning for the southwestern extension of Circle Drive led to some concerns as early concepts for the proposed flyover interchange with Idylwyld Freeway would have required demolition of many homes on or near Glasgow Street. The final design, which opened to traffic on July 31, 2013, sacrificed some greenspace in the southwest corner of the community, and the construction of sound attenuation fencing, but otherwise required no home demolition.
