= Electoral history of Arthur Meighen =

List of elections featuring Arthur Meighen as a candidate

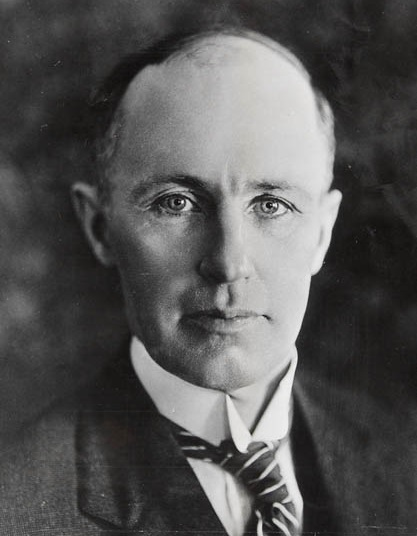
Arthur Meighen, ninth prime minister of Canada

The article is the electoral history of Arthur Meighen, the ninth prime minister of Canada.

A Conservative, he served two short terms as prime minister. He became prime minister upon the resignation of Sir Robert Borden in 1921, and again upon the resignation of Mackenzie King in 1926. His first term was just over one year, and the second for only a few months.

He led his party in three general elections and lost all three to King. Appointed to the Senate in 1932, he attempted an electoral come-back in 1942, but was defeated in his attempt to re-enter Parliament.

Meighen stood for election to the House of Commons of Canada nine times, winning six times and losing three times. He was acclaimed once. His defeat in his constituency in the 1921 election was the first time in Canada that a sitting prime minister lost his seat. He lost his seat again in the 1926 election, becoming the only sitting Canadian prime minister to lose his seat twice (Mackenzie King lost his seat twice while prime minister in 1925 and 1945 but did not resign).

== Summary ==
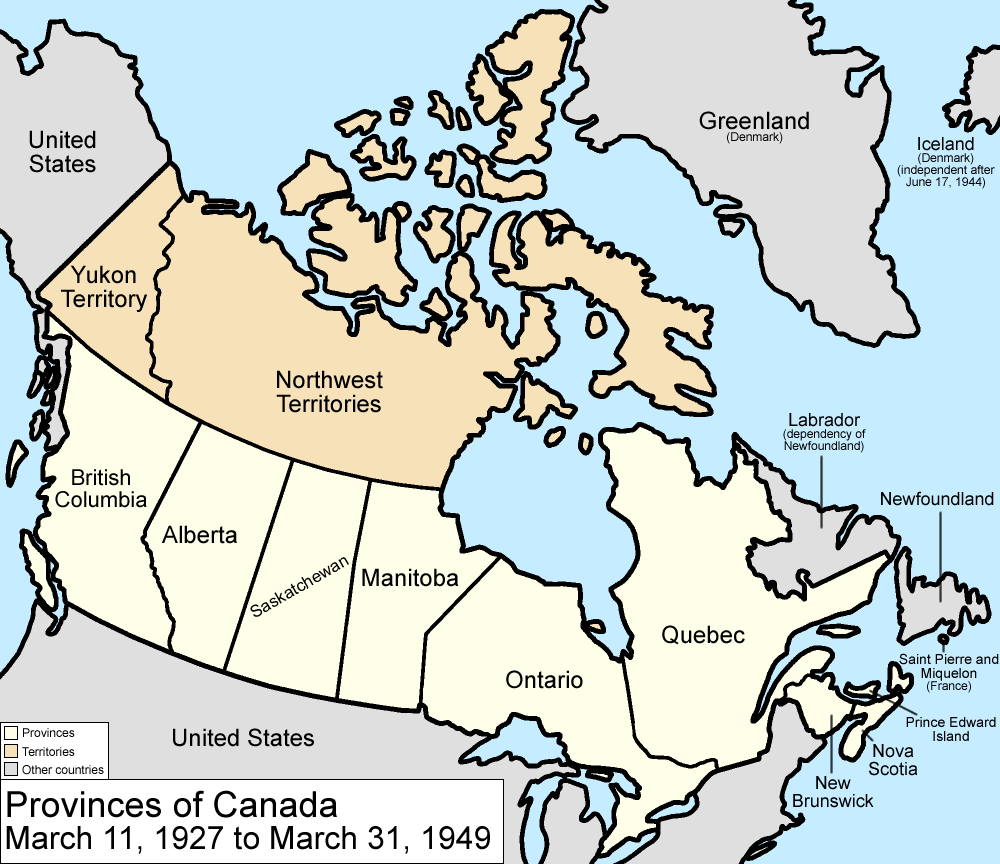
Canada had nine provinces and two territories during Meighen's time in office.

Meighen ranks seventeenth out of twenty-three prime ministers for time in office, serving two short terms. He was prime minister for one year and 172 days in 1920-1921, and then again for 88 days in 1926.

Meighen was the second of four prime ministers to serve non-consecutive terms, the others being Sir John A. Macdonald, King, and Pierre Trudeau.

Meighen is the only prime minister from Manitoba.

Meighen served in several positions in the government of Sir Robert Borden from 1913 to 1920. When Borden announced his retirement, Meighen was chosen as party leader by Borden, after extensive consultations with the Conservative caucus. As leader of the majority party in the Commons, Meighen automatically became prime minister, and did not call a general election immediately on taking office in 1920. When he called the general election the next year, in 1921, he was defeated by Mackenzie King and the Liberals. Meighen became Leader of the Opposition. However, since he had been defeated in his own riding of Portage la Prairie, he had to be elected in a by-election before he could re-enter Parliament. This was the first time in Canada that a sitting prime minister lost his seat.

Four years later, in the general election of October 1925, Meighen again led the Conservatives and was again defeated by Mackenzie King. However, in the spring of the next year, a procurement scandal in the federal government led to King's resignation. Because the election had been so recent and the state of the parties in the Commons was fluid, Governor-General Byng appointed Meighen to succeed King as prime minister, rather than call a general election, as King had requested. Byng's refusal to call the election on King's request triggered a constitutional crisis, the King-Byng affair. The Meighen government fell shortly afterwards his appointment on a motion of non-confidence and the Governor-General then called an election, which King won by a majority. For the second time, Meighen did not win his seat in the general election and resigned immediately as leader of the Conservatives.

Meighen served in the Senate of Canada from 1932 to 1942.

In 1942, Meighen attempted a political comeback and was elected leader of the Conservatives. He stood for election in a by-election, but was defeated. He resigned the leadership and retired from politics.

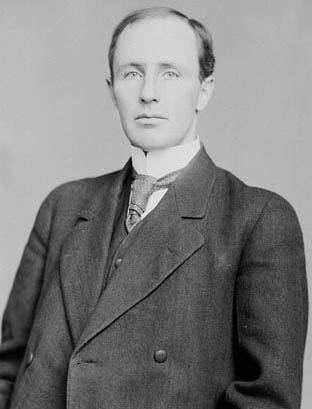
Meighen in 1912

Meighen began his political career in the federal election of 1908. He stood for election to the House of Commons of Canada nine times (1908, 1911 1913, 1917, 1921, 1922, 1925, 1926, and 1942), primarily in the constituency of Portage la Prairie, Manitoba. He was elected six times (1908, 1911, 1913, 1917, 1922 and 1925) and defeated three times (1921, 1926 and 1942).

== Federal general elections, 1921 to 1926 ==
Meighen led the Conservative Party in three general elections (1921, 1925 and 1926). He lost all three to Mackenzie King although King technically lost the 1925 election.

=== Canadian federal election, 1921 ===
Meighen called the election the year after he was appointed prime minister. King won a razor-thin majority and was able to form a government with the support of members of the Progressives. Meighen and the Conservatives came in third in party standings in the Commons, after the Liberals and the Progressives. However, the Progressives declined to form the Official Opposition and Meighen became the Leader of the Opposition.

Canadian federal election, 1921 – Parties, leaders, seats won and popular vote
Party	Leaders	Seats won	Popular vote
Liberal	W. L. Mackenzie King^{1}	118	41.2%
Progressive	T. A. Crerar	58	21.1%
Liberal-Conservative	Arthur Meighen^{2}	49	30.0%
Labour	J. S. Woodsworth	3	2.7%
Independents	–	2	3.0%
United Farmers of Alberta	–	2	0.7%
Independent Conservative	–	1	0.4%
United Farmers of Ontario	–	1	0.1%
Independent Progressive	–	1	0.1%
Total		235	99.3%^{3}
Sources: History of Federal Ridings since 1867

^{1} Leader of the Opposition when election was called; Prime Minister after the election.
^{2} Prime Minister when election was called; Leader of the Opposition after the election.
^{3} Table does not include parties which received votes but did not elect any members.

=== Canadian federal election, 1925 ===
The 1925 election was called by Prime Minister King. Meighen and the Liberal-Conservatives won more seats than King and the Liberals in the election, but did not win a majority. King was able to form a minority government with the support of the Progressives and Meighen remained Leader of the Opposition. However, King resigned over a federal procurement scandal less than a year into office. The Governor-General, Lord Byng, refused King's request for a dissolution of Parliament and instead appointed Meighen as prime minister. When Meighen's government fell on a non-confidence motion shortly after being appointed, the Governor-General granted his request for a dissolution and called the 1926 general election. These events triggered a constitutional crisis, the King–Byng Affair.

Canadian federal election, 1925 – Parties, leaders, seats won and popular vote
Party	Leaders	Seats won	Popular vote
Liberal-Conservative	Arthur Meighen^{1}	115	46.1%
Liberal	W. L. Mackenzie King^{2}	100	39.7%
Progressive	Robert Forke	22	8.5%
Labour	J. S. Woodsworth	2	1.8%
Independents	–	2	0.5%
United Farmers of Alberta	–	2	0.3%
Independent Liberal	–	1	1.0%
Independent Conservative	–	1	0.5%
Total		245	98.4%^{3}
Sources: History of Federal Ridings since 1867

^{1} Leader of the Opposition when election was called; Leader of the Opposition after the election.
^{2} Prime Minister when election was called; Prime Minister after the election.
^{3} Rounding error.

=== Canadian federal election, 1926 ===
This general election was called on the advice of Meighen, appointed prime minister by the Governor-General, Viscount Byng, after King resigned as prime minister. King's resignation triggered a constitutional crisis, the King–Byng Affair. King and the Liberals won the greatest number of seats in the election, but were short of a majority. King formed a minority government with support from some Progressives, particularly the Liberal-Progressives. Meighen failed to win his seat and resigned immediately as Leader of the Opposition.

Canadian federal election, 1926 – Parties, leaders, seats won and popular vote
Party	Leaders	Seats won	Popular vote
Liberal	W. L. Mackenzie King^{1}	116	42.9%
Liberal-Conservative	Arthur Meighen^{2}	91	45.4%
Progressive	–	11	3.9%
United Farmers of Alberta	–	11	1.9%
Liberal–Progressive	Robert Forke	8	1.9%
Labour	–	4	1.7%
Independents	–	2	0.8%
Independent Liberal	–	1	0.6%
United Farmers of Ontario	–	1	0.2%
Total		245	99.3%^{4}
Sources: History of Federal Ridings since 1867

^{1} Leader of the Opposition when election was called; Prime Minister after election.
^{2} Prime Minister when election was called; defeated in his constituency and did not become Leader of the Opposition.
^{3} Less than 0.05% of the popular vote.
^{4} Table does not include parties which received votes but did not elect any members.

== Federal constituency elections, 1908 to 1942 ==
Meighen stood for election to the House of Commons nine times, in two different provinces (Manitoba and Ontario), in three different ridings. He was elected six times and defeated three times.

=== 1908 Federal election: Portage La Prairie ===
Federal election, 1908: Portage La Prairie, Manitoba
Party	Candidate	Popular vote	%
Conservative	Yes Arthur Meighen	3,144	52.1%
Liberal	X John Crawford	2,894	47.9%
Total		6,038	100.0%
Source: Library of Parliament – History of Federal Ridings since 1867: Portage La Prairie

Yes Elected.
X Incumbent.

=== 1911 Federal election: Portage La Prairie ===
Federal election, 1911: Portage La Prairie, Manitoba
Party	Candidate	Popular vote	%
Conservative	Yes X Arthur Meighen	3,267	55.8%
Liberal	Robert Paterson	2,592	44.2%
Total		5,859	100.0%
Source: Library of Parliament – History of Federal Ridings since 1867: Portage La Prairie

Yes Elected.
X Incumbent.

=== 1913 Federal ministerial by-election: Portage La Prairie ===
Federal By-election, July 19, 1913: Portage La Prairie, Manitoba On Mr. Meighen being appointed Solicitor General, June 26, 1913
Party	Candidate	Popular Vote	%
Conservative	Yes X Arthur Meighen	Acclaimed	–
Source: Library of Parliament – History of Federal Ridings since 1867: Waterloo North

Yes Elected.
X Incumbent.

At this time, Members of Parliament who took a position with the Government had to stand for re-election, but it was customary for the other political party not to oppose the election.

=== 1917 Federal election: Portage La Prairie ===
Federal election, 1917: Portage La Prairie, Manitoba
Party	Candidate	Popular vote	%
Government (Unionist)	Yes X Arthur Meighen	4,611	82.5%
Opposition (Laurier Liberals)	Frederick Shirtliff	976	17.5%
Total		5,587	100.0%
Source: Library of Parliament – History of Federal Ridings since 1867: Portage La Prairie

Yes Elected.
X Incumbent.

=== 1921 Federal election: Portage La Prairie ===
Federal election, 1921: Portage La Prairie, Manitoba
Party	Candidate	Popular vote	%
Progressive	Yes Harry Leader	4,314	50.2%
Liberal-Conservative	X Arthur Meighen	4,137	48.2%
Independent	Alexander Melville Bannerman	139	1.6%
Total		8,590	100.0%
Source: Library of Parliament – History of Federal Ridings since 1867: Portage La Prairie

Yes Elected.
X Incumbent.

=== 1922 Federal by-election: Grenville ===
On the acceptance of an office of emolument under the Crown by the incumbent, Mr. Casselman, December 27, 1921.

Federal By-Election, January 26, 1922: Grenville, Ontario
Party	Candidate	Popular Vote	%
Liberal-Conservative	Yes Arthur Meighen	4,482	50.5%
Progressive	Arthur Kidd Patterson	2,820	49.5%
Total		1,761	100.0%
Source: Library of Parliament – History of Federal Ridings since 1867: Grenville

Yes Elected.

=== 1925 Federal election: Portage La Prairie ===
Federal election, 1925: Portage La Prairie, Manitoba
Party	Candidate	Popular vote	%
Conservative	Yes Arthur Meighen	5,817	53.9%
Progressive	X Harry Leader	4,966	46.1%
Total		10,783	100.0%
Source: Library of Parliament – History of Federal Ridings since 1867: Portage La Prairie

Yes Elected.
X Incumbent.

=== 1926 Federal election: Portage La Prairie ===
Federal election, 1926: Portage La Prairie, Manitoba
Party	Candidate	Popular vote	%
Liberal	Yes Ewen Alexander McPherson	6,394	51.7%
Conservative	X Arthur Meighen	5,966	48.3%
Total		12,360	100.0%
Source: Library of Parliament – History of Federal Ridings since 1867: Portage La Prairie

Yes Elected.
X Incumbent.

=== 1942 Federal by-election: York South ===
On Mr. Cockeram's resignation, November 27, 1941, to allow Mr. Arthur Meighen to contest the seat.

Federal By-Election, February 9, 1942: York South, Ontario
Party	Candidate	Popular Vote	%
Co-operative Commonwealth Federation	Yes Joseph W. Noseworthy	16,408	57.9%
Conservative	Arthur Meighen	11,952	42.1%
Total		28,360	100.0%
Source: Library of Parliament – History of Federal Ridings since 1867: Grenville

== See also ==
- Electoral history of Robert Borden – Meighen's predecessor as leader of the Conservative Party and as prime minister.
- Electoral history of William Lyon Mackenzie King – Meighen's principal opponent in three general elections, with whom he alternated twice as prime minister.
- Electoral history of R. B. Bennett – Meighen's successor as leader of the Conservative Party.
