= Isabel Meighen =

Spouse of the Prime Minister of Canada

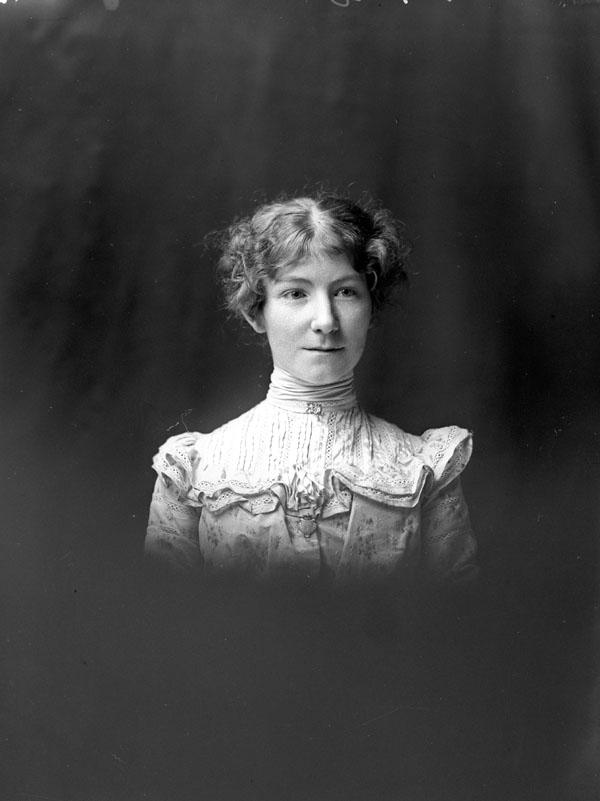
- Meighen in 1902, two years before her marriage
- Born: Jessie Isabel Cox; April 18, 1882; Granby, Quebec, Canada
- Died: September 6, 1985 (aged 103); Toronto, Ontario, Canada
- Known for: Spouse of the prime minister of Canada
- Spouse: Arthur Meighen (m. 1904; died 1960)
- Children: Theodore Meighen; Maxwell Meighen; Lillian Meighen Wright
- Relatives: Michael Meighen (grandson)

Jessie Isabel Meighen (née Cox; April 18, 1882 – September 6, 1985) was a Canadian schoolteacher who was the wife of Arthur Meighen, the ninth Prime Minister of Canada.

She was born in Granby, Quebec, and was a schoolteacher in Birtle, Manitoba, when she met Arthur Meighen. The couple married on 24 June 1904 in Birtle. They had two sons and one daughter:

- Theodore Roosevelt O'Neil Meighen (1905–1979)
- Maxwell Charles Gordon Meighen (1908–1992)
- Lillian Mary Laura Meighen Wright (1910–1993)

Meighen, whom her husband affectionately called "Nan" in private, was responsible for raising their children while Arthur was working. Reportedly, Isabel enjoyed social gatherings more than Arthur did, and she often accompanied him during overseas trips, including in 1921 when she travelled with him to the Imperial Conference in London.

Meighen was widowed in 1960 and died in 1985, aged 103. She was interred next to her husband in the St. Marys Cemetery in the town of St. Marys, Ontario. At the time of her death, she was the oldest living former spouse of a Canadian Prime Minister.

== See also ==
- Spouse of the prime minister of Canada
