= Electoral history of William Lyon Mackenzie King =

List of elections featuring William Lyon Mackenzie King as a candidate

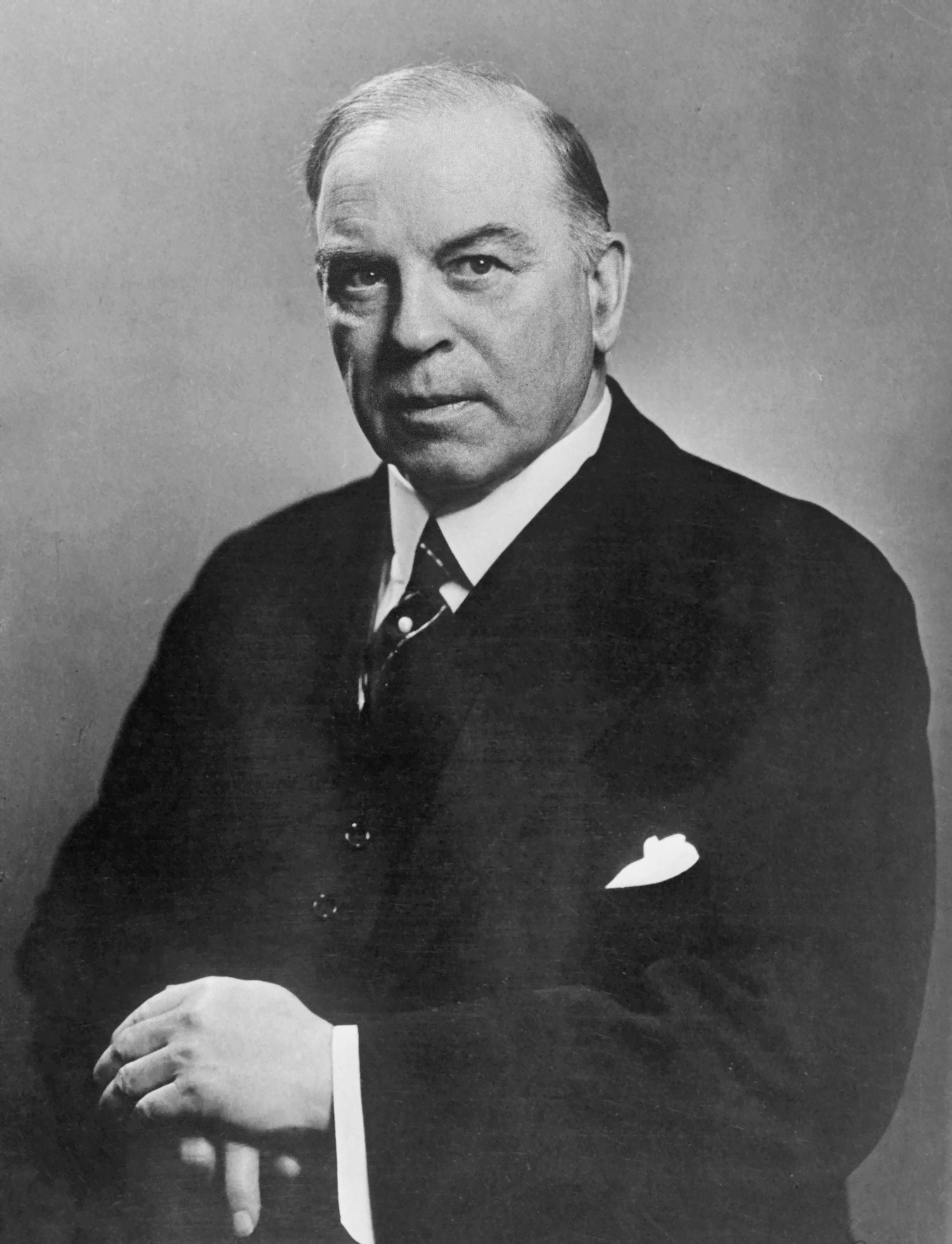
Mackenzie King in 1942.

This article is the electoral history of William Lyon Mackenzie King, the tenth Prime Minister of Canada. A Liberal, he was Canada's longest-serving prime minister, with three separate terms as prime minister (1921–1926, 1926–1930 and 1935–1948), for a total of 21 years and 154 days. He defeated Prime Ministers Arthur Meighen and R.B. Bennett at different times, and was succeeded by Prime Minister Louis St. Laurent in 1948.

King was elected to the House of Commons of Canada twelve times (1908, 1909, 1919, 1921, 1922, 1926 (twice), 1930, 1935, 1940, and 1945).

He was elected leader of the Liberal Party of Canada in 1919, by the first leadership convention for a federal party in Canada.

== Summary ==
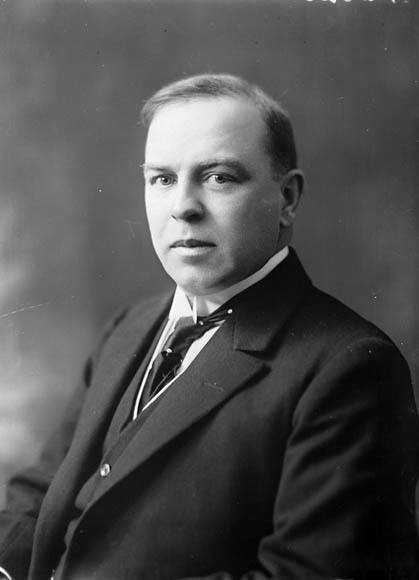
Mackenzie King in 1919.

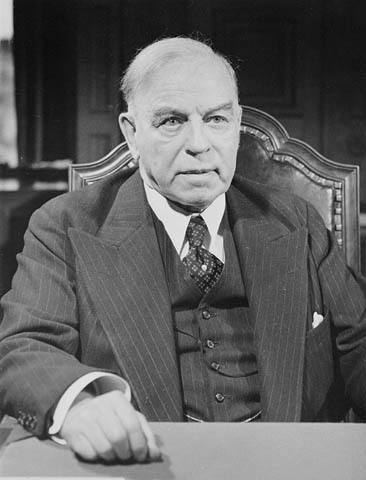
Mackenzie King at the end of his career.

King was the longest-serving Prime Minister, in office for a total of 21 years, 154 days. He led the Liberal Party of Canada in seven consecutive general elections, winning six times (1921, 1925, 1926, 1935, 1940, 1945) and losing once (1930). He won minority governments three times (1925, 1926 1945) and majority governments three times (1921, 1935, and 1940). He is in a three-way tie with Sir John A. Macdonald and Sir Wilfrid Laurier for the number of general elections he contested as leader of a party.

His unbroken term in office from October 23, 1935 to November 14, 1948 (just over thirteen years) is the second-longest unbroken term, coming after Laurier's unbroken term in office of over fifteen years (July 11, 1896 to October 6, 1911) and just ahead of Macdonald's longest unbroken term of just under thirteen years (October 17, 1878 to June 6, 1891).

King was the third of four prime ministers to serve non-consecutive terms, the others being Macdonald, Meighen, and Pierre Trudeau.

King was the fourth of five prime ministers from Ontario, the others being Sir John A. Macdonald, Alexander Mackenzie, Sir Mackenzie Bowell, and Lester Pearson.

King stood for election to the House of Commons of Canada sixteen times, in ten general elections and six by-elections. He was elected twelve times and defeated four times. Three of the by-elections were ministerial by-elections, triggered by King entering the federal Cabinet, once as Minister of Labour (1909) and twice as prime minister (1922, 1926). Two of the by-elections were in response to his defeats in his own constituency in general elections, which compelled him to seek election to a safe seat to re-enter the Commons. One by-election was after his election as leader of the Liberal Party, where he stood for election in a vacant seat to enter the House of Commons as quickly as possible.

King was a member of the House of Commons for five different constituencies, from three different provinces (Ontario, Prince Edward Island and Saskatchewan), a more diverse electoral record than any other prime minister. He served in the House of Commons for a total of 32 years and 7 days.

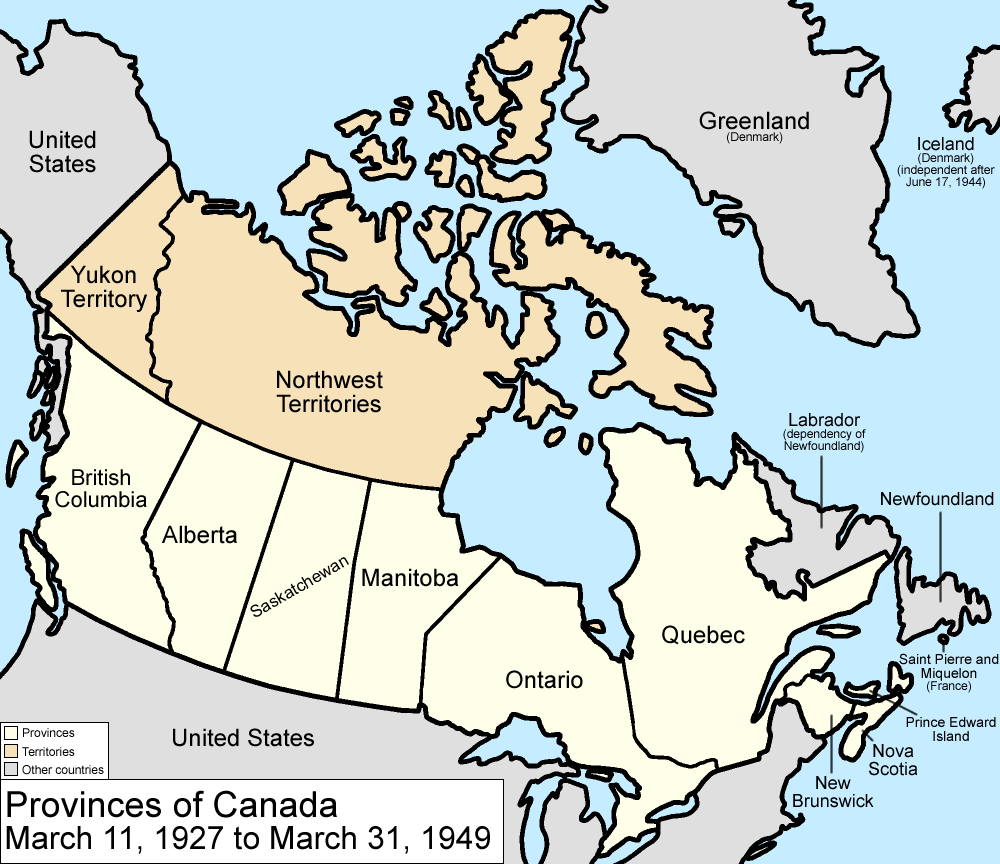
Canada had nine provinces and two territories throughout King's time in office.

== Federal general elections, 1921 to 1945 ==
King led the Liberal Party in seven general elections, winning six (three majority governments and three minority governments) and was defeated once.

=== Federal election, 1921 ===
The 1921 election resulted in the a razor-thin majority government for King. King was able to maintain his government for four years, with the support of the Progressives in the Commons.

Canadian federal election, 1921 – parties, leaders, seats won and popular vote
| Party | Leaders | Seats won | Popular vote |
|---|---|---|---|
| Liberal | W. L. Mackenzie King^{1} | 118 | 41.2% |
| Progressive | T. A. Crerar | 58 | 21.1% |
| Conservative | Arthur Meighen^{2} | 49 | 30.0% |
| Labour | J. S. Woodsworth | 3 | 2.7% |
| Independents | – | 2 | 3.0% |
| United Farmers of Alberta | – | 2 | 0.7% |
| Independent Conservative | – | 1 | 0.4% |
| United Farmers of Ontario | – | 1 | 0.1% |
| Independent Progressive | – | 1 | 0.1% |
| Total | | 235 | 99.3%^{3} |
Sources: Library of Parliament – History of Federal Ridings since 1867

^{1} Leader of the Opposition when election was called; Prime Minister after the election.
^{2} Prime Minister when election was called; Leader of the Opposition after the election.
^{3} Table does not include parties which received votes but did not elect any members.

=== Federal election, 1925 ===
Although Arthur Meighen and the Liberal-Conservatives won more seats than King and the Liberals, King was able to form a minority government with the support of the Progressives. King was also defeated in his own seat of York North, Ontario and had to seek election in a safe seat, Prince Albert, Saskatchewan. However, he was forced to resign over a federal procurement scandal less than a year into office, leading to his replacement as prime minister by Arthur Meighen, leader of the Liberal-Conservatives. These events triggered a constitutional crisis, the King–Byng Affair, and the general election of 1926.

Canadian federal election, 1925 – parties, leaders, seats won and popular vote
| Party | Leaders | Seats won | Popular vote |
|---|---|---|---|
| Liberal-Conservative | Arthur Meighen^{1} | 115 | 46.1% |
| Liberal | W. L. Mackenzie King^{2} | 100 | 39.7% |
| Progressive | Robert Forke | 22 | 8.5% |
| Labour | J. S. Woodsworth | 2 | 1.8% |
| Independents | – | 2 | 0.5% |
| United Farmers of Alberta | – | 2 | 0.3% |
| Independent Liberal | – | 1 | 1.0% |
| Independent Conservative | – | 1 | 0.5% |
| Total | | 245 | 98.4%^{4} |
Sources: Library of Parliament – History of Federal Ridings since 1867

^{1} Leader of the Opposition when election was called; Leader of the Opposition after the election.
^{2} Prime Minister when election was called; Prime Minister after the election.
^{3} Less than 0.05% of the popular vote.
^{4} Table does not include parties which received votes but did not elect any members.

=== Federal election, 1926 ===
This general election was called on the advice of Prime Minister Meighen, appointed prime minister by the governor-general, Viscount Byng, after King resigned as prime minister. King's resignation triggered a constitutional crisis, the King–Byng Affair. King and the Liberals won the greatest number of seats in the election, but were short of a majority. King formed a minority government with support from some Progressives, particularly the Liberal-Progressives. His minority government lasted for four years.

Canadian federal election, 1926 – parties, leaders, seats won and popular vote
| Party | Leaders | Seats won | Popular vote |
|---|---|---|---|
| Liberal | W. L. Mackenzie King^{1} | 116 | 42.9% |
| Liberal-Conservative | Arthur Meighen^{2} | 91 | 45.4% |
| Progressive | – | 11 | 3.9% |
| United Farmers of Alberta | – | 11 | 1.9% |
| Liberal–Progressive | Robert Forke | 8 | 1.9% |
| Labour | – | 4 | 1.7% |
| Independents | – | 2 | 0.8% |
| Independent Liberal | – | 1 | 0.6% |
| United Farmers of Ontario | – | 1 | 0.2% |
| Total | | 245 | 99.3%^{3} |
Sources: Library of Parliament – History of Federal Ridings since 1867

^{1} Leader of the Opposition when election was called; Prime Minister after the election.
^{2} Prime Minister when election was called; Leader of the Opposition after the election.
^{3} Less than 0.05% of the popular vote.
^{3} Table does not include parties which received votes but did not elect any members.

=== Federal election, 1930 ===
The 1930 election was King's only election loss at the national level. The Liberal-Conservatives formed a majority government, with R.B. Bennett as prime minister. King remained as leader of the Liberal Party and became Leader of the Opposition.

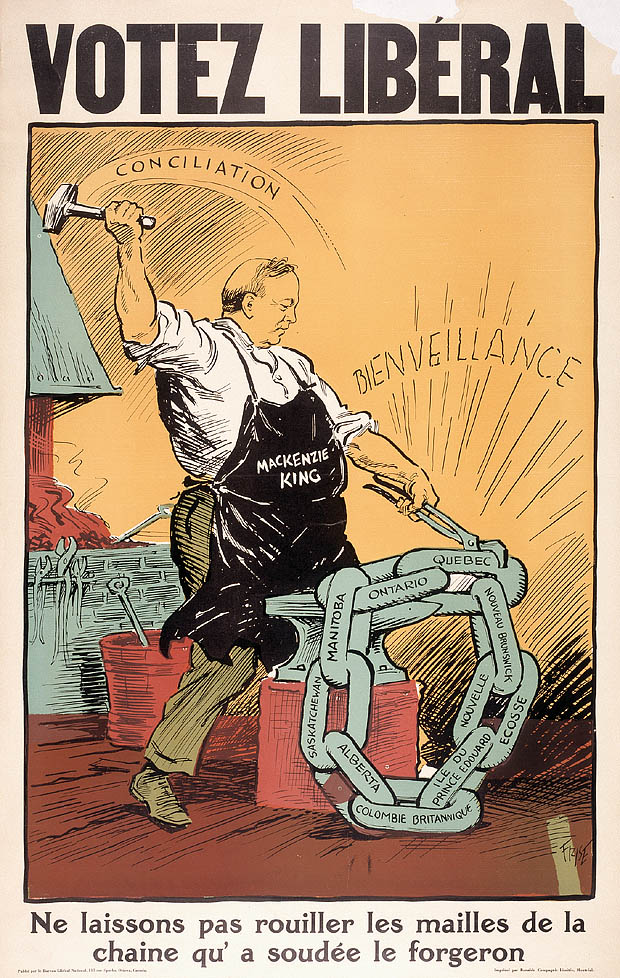
Election poster showing Mackenzie King in 1930 general election.

Canadian federal election, 1930 – parties, leaders, seats won and popular vote
| Party | Leaders | Seats won | Popular vote |
|---|---|---|---|
| Liberal-Conservative | R. B. Bennett^{1} | 135 | 47.8% |
| Liberal | W. L. Mackenzie King^{2} | 89 | 44.0% |
| United Farmers of Alberta | – | 9 | 1.5% |
| Progressive | – | 3 | 1.8% |
| Liberal–Progressive | – | 3 | 1.2% |
| Labour | J. S. Woodsworth | 2 | 0.7% |
| Independents | – | 2 | 0.6% |
| Progressive-Conservative | – | 1 | 0.4% |
| Independent Labour | – | 1 | 0.4% |
| Total | | 245 | 98.4%^{4} |
Sources: Library of Parliament – History of Federal Ridings since 1867

^{1} Leader of the Opposition when election was called; Prime Minister after election.
^{2} Prime Minister when election was called; Leader of the Opposition after the election.
^{3} Less than 0.5% of the popular vote.
^{4} Table does not include parties which received votes but did not elect any members.

=== Federal election, 1935 ===
In the 1935 election, King and the Liberals decisively defeated the Liberal-Conservatives, giving King his first outright majority government.

Canadian federal election, 1935 – parties, leaders, seats won and popular vote
| Party | Leaders | Seats won | Popular vote |
|---|---|---|---|
| Liberal | W. L. Mackenzie King^{1} | 173 | 44.7% |
| Liberal-Conservative | R. B. Bennett^{2} | 39 | 29.8% |
| Social Credit | J. H. Blackmore | 17 | 4.1% |
| Co-operative Commonwealth Federation | J. S. Woodsworth | 7 | 9.3% |
| Liberal–Progressive | – | 4 | 0.7% |
| Reconstruction | H. H. Stevens | 1 | 8.7% |
| Independent Liberal | – | 1 | 1.2% |
| Independent | – | 1 | 0.4% |
| United Farmers of Ontario-Labour | – | 1 | 0.4% |
| Independent Conservative | – | 1 | 0.0%^{3} |
| Total | | 245 | 99.3%^{4} |
Sources: Library of Parliament – History of Federal Ridings since 1867

^{1} Leader of the Opposition when election was called; Prime Minister after election.
^{2} Prime Minister when election was called; Leader of the Opposition after the election.
^{3} Less than 0.04% of national vote.
^{4} Table does not include parties which received votes but did not elect any members.

=== Federal election, 1940 ===
In the 1940 election, King and the Liberals were re-elected, with another majority government.

Canadian federal election, 1940 – parties, leaders, seats won and popular vote
| Party | Leaders | Seats won | Popular vote |
|---|---|---|---|
| Liberal | W. L. Mackenzie King^{1} | 179 | 51.3% |
| National Government | Robert Manion ^{2} | 36 | 29.2% |
| Conservative | Robert Manion ^{2} | 3 | 1.2% |
| Co-operative Commonwealth Federation | J. S. Woodsworth | 8 | 8.4% |
| Social Credit | J. H. Blackmore | 7 | 1.0% |
| New Democracy | W. D. Herridge | 3 | 1.6% |
| Liberal–Progressive | – | 3 | 0.6% |
| Independent Liberal | – | 2 | 3.2% |
| Independent | – | 1 | 1.2% |
| Independent Conservative | – | 1 | 0.2% |
| Unity | – | 1 | 0.3% |
| United Reform | – | 1 | 0.3% |
| Total | | 245 | 98.5%^{3} |
Sources: Library of Parliament – History of Federal Ridings since 1867

^{1} Prime Minister when election was called; Prime Minister after election.
^{2} Leader of the Opposition when election was called; Leader of the Opposition after the election.
^{3} Table does not include parties which received votes but did not elect any members.

=== Federal election, 1945 ===
In the 1945 election, King and the Liberals were re-elected, but with another minority government. King managed to stay in power by a working alliance with a group of Independent Liberals, who had opposed his position on conscription. King was defeated in his own seat of Prince Albert, Saskatchewan, and had to seek election in another safe seat, Glengarry, Ontario.

Canadian federal election, 1945 – parties, leaders, seats won and popular vote
| Party | Leaders | Seats won | Popular vote |
|---|---|---|---|
| Liberal | W. L. Mackenzie King^{1} | 118 | 39.8% |
| Progressive Conservative | John Bracken^{2} | 66 | 27.6% |
| Co-operative Commonwealth Federation | M. J. Coldwell | 28 | 15.6% |
| Social Credit | Solon Earl Low | 13 | 4.1% |
| Independent Liberal | – | 8 | 1.8% |
| Independent | – | 6 | 4.9% |
| Bloc populaire | Maxime Raymond | 2 | 3.3% |
| Labor–Progressive^{3} | Tim Buck | 1 | 2.1% |
| Independent Progressive Conservative | – | 1 | 0.3% |
| Independent Co-operative Commonwealth Federation | – | 1 | 0.1% |
| Liberal–Progressive | – | 1 | 0.1% |
| Total | | 245 | 99.7%^{3} |
Sources: Library of Parliament – History of Federal Ridings since 1867

^{1} Prime Minister when election was called; Prime Minister after election.
^{2} Leader of the Opposition when election was called; Leader of the Opposition after the election.
^{3} Table does not include parties which received votes but did not elect any members.

== Federal constituency elections, 1908 to 1945 ==
King stood for election to the House of Commons sixteen times, in three different provinces (Ontario, Prince Edward Island and Saskatchewan).

=== 1908 Federal election: Waterloo North ===
1908 Canadian federal election: Waterloo North
| Party | Candidate | Votes | % | Elected |
|---|---|---|---|---|
| Liberal | William Lyon Mackenzie King | 3,469 | 51.58 | ✓ |
| Conservative | Richard Reid | 3,206 | 47.67 | |
| Independent | Allen Hubur | 50 | 0.74 | |
| Total valid votes | | 6,725 | 100.00 | |
Source(s) "Waterloo North, Ontario (1867-08-06 - 1968-04-22)". History of Federal Ridings Since 1867. Library of Parliament.

=== 1909 Federal ministerial by-election: Waterloo North ===
At this time, newly appointed Cabinet ministers had to stand for re-election, but it was customary for the other political party not to oppose the election.

Canadian federal by-election, June 6, 1909: Waterloo North Federal Ministerial by-election for King's appointment as Minister of Labour on June 21, 1909
| Party | Candidate | Votes | Elected |
|---|---|---|---|
| Liberal | William Lyon Mackenzie King | acclaimed | ✓ |
| Total valid votes | | - | - |
Source(s) "Waterloo North, Ontario (1867-08-06 - 1968-04-22)". History of Federal Ridings Since 1867. Library of Parliament.

=== 1911 Federal election: Waterloo North ===
This was the first of King's four defeats at the constituency level.

1911 Canadian federal election: Waterloo North
| Party | Candidate | Votes | % | Elected |
|---|---|---|---|---|
| Conservative | William George Weichel | 3,774 | 52.18 | ✓ |
| Liberal | William Lyon Mackenzie King | 3,459 | 47.82 | |
| Total valid votes | | 7,223 | 100.00 | |
Source(s) "Waterloo North, Ontario (1867-08-06 - 1968-04-22)". History of Federal Ridings Since 1867. Library of Parliament.

=== 1917 Federal election: York North ===
This was the second of King's four defeats at the constituency level.

1917 Canadian federal election: York North
| Party | Candidate | Votes | % | Elected |
|---|---|---|---|---|
| Government (Unionist) | John Alexander Macdonald Armstrong | 3,948 | 57.91 | ✓ |
| Opposition (Laurier Liberals) | William Lyon Mackenzie King | 2,870 | 42.09 | |
| Total valid votes | | 6,818 | 100.00 | |
Source(s) "York North, Ontario (1867-08-06 - 2004-05-22)". History of Federal Ridings Since 1867. Library of Parliament.

=== 1919 Federal by-election: Prince ===
This by-election was triggered by the death of the incumbent, Joseph Read. King had recently been elected leader of the Liberal Party, and stood for election in Prince Edward Island to obtain a seat in the Commons as quickly as possible.

Canadian federal by-election, October 20, 1919: Prince Federal by-election following Joseph Reed's death on April 6, 1919
| Party | Candidate | Votes | Elected |
|---|---|---|---|
| Liberal | William Lyon Mackenzie King | acclaimed | ✓ |
| Total valid votes | | - | - |
Source(s) "Prince, Prince Edward Island (1904-09-20 - 1968-04-22)". History of Federal Ridings Since 1867. Library of Parliament.

=== 1921 Federal election: York North ===
1921 Canadian federal election: York North
| Party | Candidate | Votes | % | Elected |
|---|---|---|---|---|
| Liberal | William Lyon Mackenzie King | 5,167 | 42.17 | ✓ |
| Conservative | John Alexander Macdonald Armstrong | 4,112 | 33.56 | |
| Progressive | Ralph Waldo Emerson Burnaby | 2,973 | 24.27 | |
| Total valid votes | | 12,252 | 100.00 | |
Source(s) "York North, Ontario (1867-08-06 - 2004-05-22)". History of Federal Ridings Since 1867. Library of Parliament.

=== 1922 Federal ministerial by-election: York North ===
At this time, newly appointed Cabinet ministers, including a new prime minister, had to stand for re-election, but it was customary for the other political party not to oppose the election.

Canadian federal by-election, January 19, 1922: York North Federal Ministerial by-election for King's appointment as Prime Minister
| Party | Candidate | Votes | Elected |
|---|---|---|---|
| Liberal | William Lyon Mackenzie King | acclaimed | ✓ |
| Total valid votes | | - | - |
Source(s) "York North, Ontario (1867-08-06 - 2004-05-22)". History of Federal Ridings Since 1867. Library of Parliament.

=== 1925 Federal election: York North ===
This was the third of King's four defeats at the constituency level.

1925 Canadian federal election: York North
| Party | Candidate | Votes | % | Elected |
|---|---|---|---|---|
| Conservative | Thomas Herbert Lennox | 10,028 | 51.26 | ✓ |
| Liberal | William Lyon Mackenzie King | 9,534 | 48.74 | |
| Total valid votes | | 19,562 | 100.00 | |
Source(s) "York North, Ontario (1867-08-06 - 2004-05-22)". History of Federal Ridings Since 1867. Library of Parliament.

=== 1926 Federal by-election: Prince Albert ===
The incumbent, Charles McDonald, who had just won the Prince Albert seat in the 1925 general election, was persuaded to resign to allow King to stand for election and re-enter the House of Commons. Although the custom at the time was that the other parties would not contest a by-election to allow a party leader to obtain a seat, the defeated Conservative candidate from the general election, future prime minister John Diefenbaker, encouraged David Burgess to contest the seat as an independent.

Canadian federal by-election, February 15, 1926: Prince Albert Charles McDonald's resignation on January 15, 1926.
| Party | Candidate | Votes | % | ±% | Elected |
|---|---|---|---|---|---|
| Liberal | William Lyon Mackenzie King | 7,920 | 77.50 | +26.3 | ✓ |
| Independent | David Luther Burgess | 2,299 | 22.50 | | |
| Total valid votes | | 10,219 | 100.0 | | |
History of Federal Ridings Since 1867

=== 1926 Federal election: Prince Albert ===
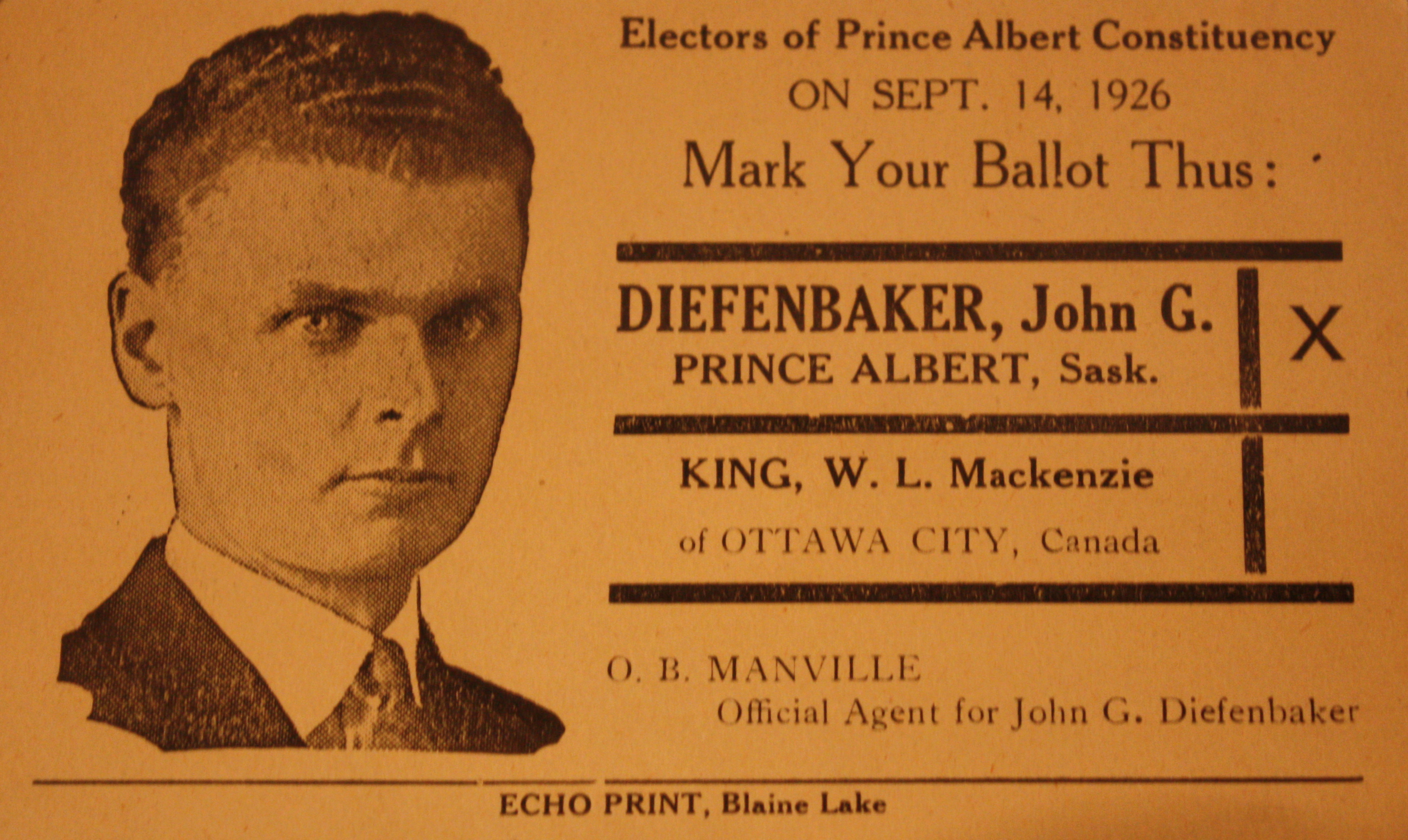
Diefenbaker campaign poster in the 1926 election.

This is the only case where two future prime ministers faced each other as candidates for the same riding.

1926 Canadian federal election: Prince Albert
| Party | Candidate | Votes | % | ±% | Elected |
|---|---|---|---|---|---|
| Liberal | William Lyon Mackenzie King | 8,933 | 64.87 | −12.6 | ✓ |
| Conservative | John Diefenbaker | 4,838 | 35.13 | | |
| Total valid votes | | 13,771 | 100.0 | | |
Source(s) "Prince Albert, Saskatchewan (1908-09-17 - 1988-09-30)". History of Federal Ridings Since 1867. Library of Parliament.

=== 1926 Federal ministerial by-election: Prince Albert ===
Due to a federal procurement scandal, King had resigned as prime minister in mid-1926 and been replaced by Arthur Meighen, who shortly afterwards called the 1926 general election. Having won the general election and been appointed prime minister, King was required to stand for re-election, but it was customary for the other political party not to oppose the election.

Canadian federal by-election, November 2, 1926: Prince Albert On Mr. King's acceptance of an office of emolument under the Crown, October 11, 1926.
| Party | Candidate | Votes | Elected |
|---|---|---|---|
| Liberal | William Lyon Mackenzie King | acclaimed | ✓ |
| Total valid votes | | - | - |
Source(s) "Prince Albert, Saskatchewan (1908-09-17 - 1988-09-30)". History of Federal Ridings Since 1867. Library of Parliament.

=== 1930 Federal election: Prince Albert ===
1930 Canadian federal election: Prince Albert
| Party | Candidate | Votes | % | ±% | Elected |
|---|---|---|---|---|---|
| Liberal | William Lyon Mackenzie King | 9,283 | 53.43 | | ✓ |
| Conservative | George Braden | 8,091 | 46.57 | | |
| Total valid votes | | 17,374 | 100.0 | | |
Source(s) "Prince Albert, Saskatchewan (1908-09-17 - 1988-09-30)". History of Federal Ridings Since 1867. Library of Parliament.

=== 1935 Federal election: Prince Albert ===
1935 Canadian federal election: Prince Albert
| Party | Candidate | Votes | % | ±% | Elected |
|---|---|---|---|---|---|
| Liberal | William Lyon Mackenzie King | 9,087 | 54.67 | +1.2 | ✓ |
| Social Credit | Alexander Rupert Bedard | 3,185 | 19.16 | | |
| Conservative | Tom Francis Graves | 2,880 | 17.33 | −29.2 | |
| Co-operative Commonwealth | Tom Johnston | 1,469 | 8.84 | | |
| Total valid votes | | 16,621 | 100.0 | | |
Source(s) "Prince Albert, Saskatchewan (1908-09-17 - 1988-09-30)". History of Federal Ridings Since 1867. Library of Parliament.

=== 1940 Federal election: Prince Albert ===
1940 Canadian federal election: Prince Albert
| Party | Candidate | Votes | % | ±% | Elected |
|---|---|---|---|---|---|
| Liberal | William Lyon Mackenzie King | 8,310 | 45.96 | −8.7 | ✓ |
| National-Unity | Robert Rae Manville | 7,534 | 41.67 | | |
| Co-operative Commonwealth | Peter William Strelive | 1,993 | 11.02 | +2.2 | |
| Communist | Alfred Cowie Campbell | 243 | 1.34 | | |
| Total valid votes | | 18,080 | 100.0 | | |
Source(s) "Prince Albert, Saskatchewan (1908-09-17 - 1988-09-30)". History of Federal Ridings Since 1867. Library of Parliament.

=== 1945 Federal election: Prince Albert ===
This was the fourth of King's four defeats at the constituency level.

1945 Canadian federal election: Prince Albert
| Party | Candidate | Votes | % | ±% | Elected |
|---|---|---|---|---|---|
| Co-operative Commonwealth | Edward LeRoy Bowerman | 7,928 | 40.99 | +30.0 | ✓ |
| Liberal | William Lyon Mackenzie King | 7,799 | 40.32 | −5.6 | |
| Progressive Conservative | Walter Hemming Nelson | 2,768 | 14.31 | | |
| Social Credit | Joshua Norman Haldeman | 847 | 4.38 | | |
| Total valid votes | | 19,342 | 100.0 | | |
Source(s) "Prince Albert, Saskatchewan (1908-09-17 - 1988-09-30)". History of Federal Ridings Since 1867. Library of Parliament.

=== 1945 Federal by-election: Glengarry ===
In the 1945 general election, William MacDiarmid won the seat for the Liberals. He resigned the seat to allow King an opportunity to re-enter the House of Commons.

Canadian federal by-election, August 6, 1945: Glengarry On William MacDiarmid's acceptance of an office of emolument under the Crown, June 22, 1945
| Party | Candidate | Votes | % |
|---|---|---|---|
| Liberal | William Lyon Mackenzie King | 4,551 | 93.33 |
| Independent | Richard Monahan | 325 | 6.67 |
| Total valid votes | | 4,876 | 100.0 |
Source(s) "Glengarry, Ontario (1925-09-05 - 1953-06-12)". History of Federal Ridings Since 1867. Library of Parliament.

== Liberal Party leadership convention, 1919 ==
King won the leadership after three completed ballots. His primary opposition was William Stevens Fielding, former premier of Nova Scotia and former Finance Minister in Laurier's governments.

Liberal Leadership Convention, August 7, 1919 Voting results by ballot
| Candidate | First ballot | | Second ballot | | Third ballot | | Fourth ballot | | Fifth ballot | |
| Candidate | Votes cast | % | Votes cast | % | Votes cast | % | Votes cast | % | Votes cast | % |
|---|---|---|---|---|---|---|---|---|---|---|
| Mackenzie King | 344 | 36.3% | 411 | 43.8% | – | – | – | – | 476 | 52.1% |
| William Stevens Fielding | 297 | 31.4% | 344 | 36.6% | – | – | – | – | 438 | 47.9% |
| George Perry Graham | 153 | 16.2% | 124 | 13.2% | Withdrew on third ballot, which was then cancelled. | | – | – | – | – |
| Daniel Duncan McKenzie | 153 | 16.2% | 60 | 6.4% | – | – | Withdrew on fourth ballot, which was then cancelled. | | – | – |
| Total | 947 | 100.1%^{1} | 939 | 100.0% | – | – | – | – | 914 | 100.0% |
Source: CPAC – 1919 Liberal Convention

^{1} Rounding error.

== See also ==
- Electoral history of Wilfrid Laurier – King's predecessor as leader of the Liberal party.
- Electoral history of Arthur Meighen – King's principal opponent in three general elections, with whom he alternated twice as prime minister.
- Electoral history of R. B. Bennett – King's principal opponent in two general elections, with whom he alternated as prime minister.
- Electoral history of Louis St. Laurent – King's successor as leader of the Liberal party and as prime minister.
