= Calvert Charlton Miller =

Canadian politician

Calvert Charlton Miller (September 3, 1899 - July 1, 1978) was a Canadian lawyer, politician and jurist.

Miller was born and raised in Portage la Prairie. He articled in the law firm of Meighen and Sexsmith, the law firm founded by future Prime Minister Arthur Meighen.

Miller was called to the bar in 1920 and practiced law in Portage la Prairie and was respected in his field, being elected a bencher of the Law Society of Manitoba. He was active with the Conservative Party of Manitoba serving as president of the provincial association.

In 1946, he was elected in a by-election to the House of Commons of Canada as the Progressive Conservative Member of Parliament for Portage la Prairie following the death of Harry Leader. His riding was abolished due to redistribution and Miller did not run in another electoral district in the 1949 federal election and instead retired from politics and returned to his law practice until 1959 when he was named to the Court of Queen's Bench of Manitoba. In 1960, he was appointed to Manitoba's Court of Appeal and in 1961 he was named Chief Justice of Manitoba. He retired from the bench in 1967.
