= Electoral history of R. B. Bennett =

List of elections featuring R. B. Bennett as a candidate

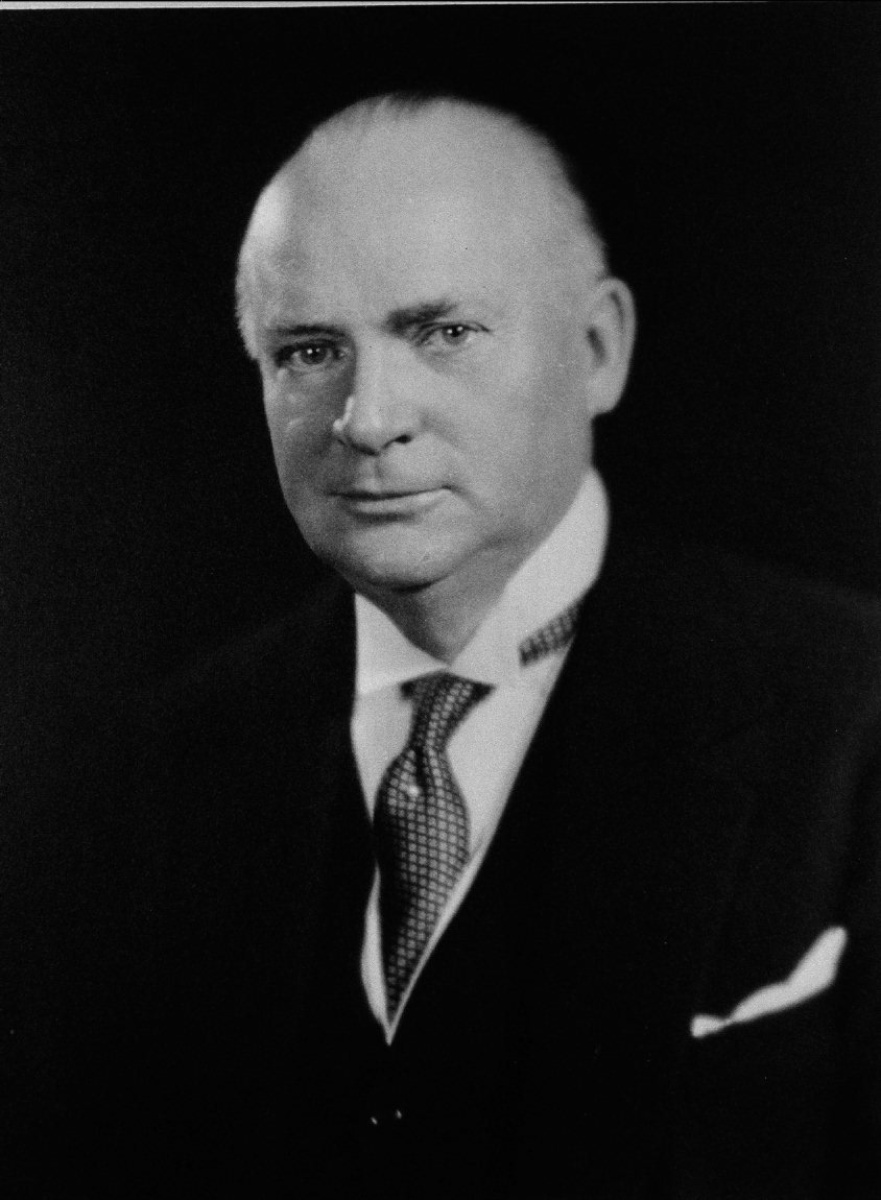
Prime Minister Richard Bedford Bennett.

This article is the electoral history of R. B. Bennett, the eleventh Prime Minister of Canada.

A Conservative, he served one term as prime minister (1930 to 1935). He won one general election (1930), defeating Prime Minister Mackenzie King. He in turn was defeated by King in the 1935 election.

Bennett stood for election to the House of Commons of Canada eight times, winning six times (1911, 1925, 1926, 1930 (twice), and 1935) and losing twice (1900 and 1921).

Bennett was elected leader of the Conservative Party in 1927, at the first leadership convention held by the Conservatives.

Before entering federal politics, he was politically active in the North-West Territories. He was elected three times to the territorial Legislative Assembly, in two general elections and one by-election. Upon the formation of the Province of Alberta, he was the first leader of the provincial Conservative Party, unsuccessfully contesting the general election of 1905 and serving as Leader of the Opposition after the election of 1909.

After retiring from Canadian politics, Bennett moved to England, where he was appointed to the House of Lords in the British Parliament.

== Summary ==
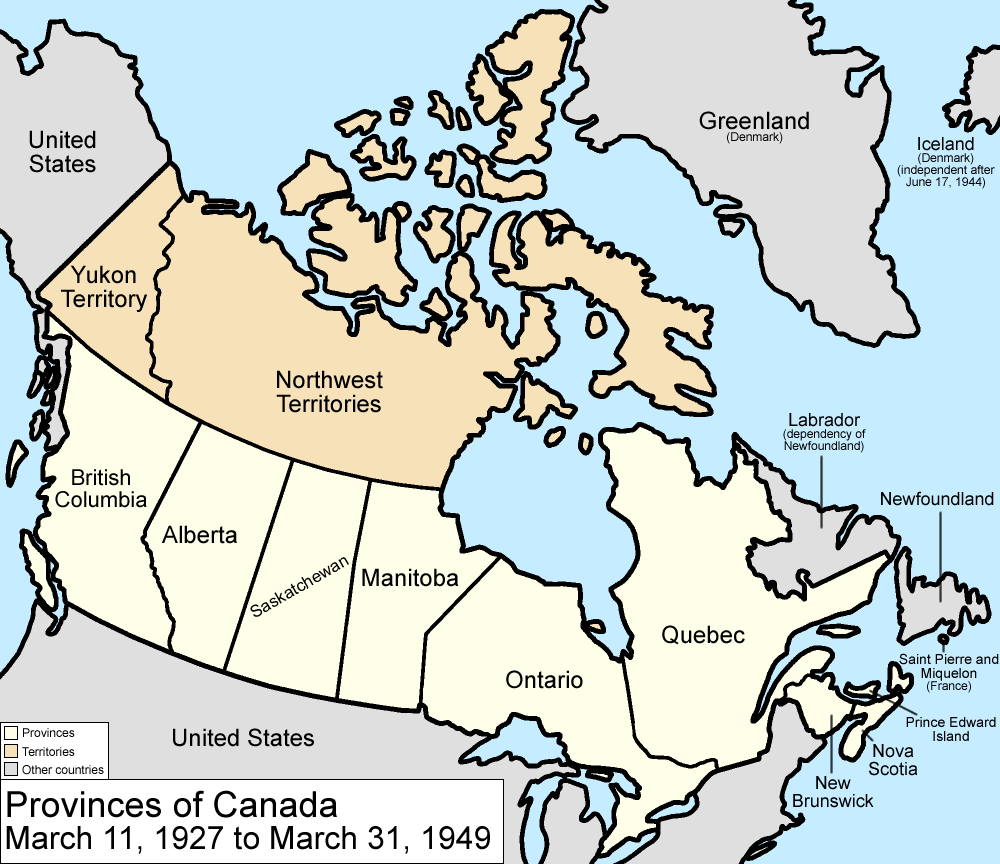
Canada during Bennett's time in office

Bennett ranks eleventh out of twenty-three prime ministers for time in office, serving one term of five years and 77 days.

He was the first of three prime ministers from Alberta, the others being Joe Clark and Stephen Harper.

Bennett served in the two governments of Arthur Meighen. When Meighen resigned after losing the 1926 general election to Mackenzie King, Bennett won the first leadership convention ever held by the Conservative Party, in 1927. He became the Leader of the Opposition. In the 1930 election, called at the beginning of the Great Depression, Bennett led the Conservatives to victory, ousting King and the Liberals. However, five years later, in the 1935 election, King won a majority and returned to power. Bennett resigned the leadership of the Conservative Party in 1938 and retired from politics.

Bennett stood for election to the Canadian House of Commons eight times. He was elected six times in the riding of Calgary West, Alberta (1911, 1925, 1926, 1930 (twice), and 1935) and defeated twice (1900 and 1921). He did not stand for election in the general election of 1917. He served in the Commons for a total of 19 years, 5 months, and 9 days.

Prior to entering federal politics, Bennett was involved in the politics of the North-West Territories and then the new province of Alberta. Upon the creation of Alberta, Bennett led the Alberta Conservative Party in the general election of 1905 but was roundly defeated by Alexander Rutherford and the Alberta Liberal Party. Bennett also lost the election for his own seat and thus not a member of the Legislative Assembly. Although he was not the leader of the party in 1909, he again stood for election in the 1909 provincial election and this time was elected. The Liberals again won a majority. Bennett was chosen by the Conservative caucus to become Leader of the Opposition.

Following his retirement from politics in 1938, Bennett moved to England. in 1941 he was granted a peerage, as "Viscount Bennett of Mickleham in the County of Surrey and of Calgary and Hopewell in the Dominion of Canada", which entitled him to sit in the House of Lords.

== Federal general elections, 1930 and 1935 ==
Bennett led the Conservative Party in two general elections, winning once (1930) and losing once (1935).

=== Federal election, 1930 ===
Bennett won a solid majority government after the 1930 election, defeating Mackenzie King and the Liberals. King remained as leader of the Liberal Party and became Leader of the Opposition.

Canadian Federal Election, 1930 - Parties, Leaders, Seats Won and Popular Vote
Party	Leaders	Seats Won	Popular Vote
Liberal-Conservative	R. B. Bennett^{1}	135	47.8%
Liberal	W. L. Mackenzie King^{2}	89	44.0%
United Farmers of Alberta	–	9	1.5%
Progressive	–	3	1.8%
Liberal–Progressive	–	3	1.2%
Labour	J. S. Woodsworth	2	0.7%
Independents	–	2	0.6%
Progressive-Conservative	–	1	0.4%
Independent Labour	–	1	0.4%
Total		245	98.4%^{3}
Sources: Library of Parliament – General Election Results – History of Federal Ridings since 1867

^{1} Leader of the Opposition when election was called; Prime Minister after election.
^{2} Prime Minister when election was called; Leader of the Opposition after the election.
^{3} Rounding error.

=== Federal election, 1935 ===
In the 1935 election, King and the Liberals decisively defeated Bennett and the Conservatives. Bennett stayed on as leader of the Conservative Party until his successor, Robert Manion, was elected in 1938.

Canadian Federal Election, 1935 - Parties, Leaders, Seats Won and Popular Vote
Party	Leaders	Seats Won	Popular Vote
Liberal	W. L. Mackenzie King^{1}	173	44.7%
Liberal-Conservative	R. B. Bennett^{2}	39	29.8%
Social Credit	J. H. Blackmore	17	4.1%
Co-operative Commonwealth Federation	J. S. Woodsworth	7	9.3%
Liberal–Progressive	–	4	0.7%
Reconstruction	H. H. Stevens	1	8.7%
Independent Liberal	–	1	1.2%
Independent	–	1	0.4%
United Farmers of Ontario-Labour	–	1	0.4%
Independent Conservative	–	1	0.0%^{3}
Total		245	99.3%^{4}
Sources: Library of Parliament – General Election Results – History of Federal Ridings since 1867

^{1} Leader of the Opposition when election was called; Prime Minister after election.
^{2} Prime Minister when election was called; Leader of the Opposition after the election.
^{3} Less than 0.05% of national vote.
^{4} Table does not include parties which received votes but did not elect any members.

== Federal constituency elections, 1900, 1911, 1921 to 1935 ==
Bennett stood for election to the House of Commons eight times, once in the North-West Territories and subsequently in the province of Alberta. He won six times and lost twice.

=== 1900 Federal Election: Alberta (Provisional District) ===
Federal Election, 1900: Alberta (Provisional District), North-West Territories
Party	Candidate	Popular Vote	%
Liberal	Yes X Frank Oliver	5,203	56.4%
Conservative	R. B. Bennett	4,029	43.6%
Total		9,232	100.0%
Source: Library of Parliament – History of Federal Ridings since 1867: Alberta (Provisional District)

Yes Elected.
X Incumbent.

=== 1911 Federal Election: Calgary ===
Federal Election, 1911: Calgary, Alberta
Party	Candidate	Popular Vote	%
Conservative	Yes R. B. Bennett	7,671	58.1%
Liberal	Isaac Stephen Gerow Van Wart	4,805	36.4%
Unknown	Arthur Masters	716	5.4%
Total		13,192	99.9%^{1}
Source: Library of Parliament – History of Federal Ridings since 1867: Calgary

Yes Elected.
^{1} Rounding error.

=== 1921 Federal Election: Calgary West ===
Federal Election, 1921: Calgary West, Alberta
Party	Candidate	Popular Vote	%
Labour	Yes Joseph Tweed Shaw	7,369	45.8%
Conservative	R. B. Bennett	7,353	45.7%
Liberal	Edward Faustinus Ryan	1,351	8.4%
Total		16,073	99.9%^{1}
Source: Library of Parliament – History of Federal Ridings since 1867: Calgary West

Yes Elected.
^{1} Rounding error.

=== 1925 Federal Election: Calgary West ===
Federal Election, 1925: Calgary West, Alberta
Party	Candidate	Popular Vote	%
Conservative	Yes R. B. Bennett	10,256	62.9%
Labour	X Joseph Tweed Shaw	6,040	37.1%
Total		16,296	100.0%
Source: Library of Parliament – History of Federal Ridings since 1867: Calgary West

Yes Elected.
X Incumbent.

=== 1926 Federal Election: Calgary West ===
Federal Election, 1926: Calgary West, Alberta
Party	Candidate	Popular Vote	%
Conservative	Yes X R. B. Bennett	8,951	57.9%
Liberal	Harry William Lunney	6,502	42.1%
Total		15,453	100.0%
Source: Library of Parliament – History of Federal Ridings since 1867: Calgary West

Yes Elected.
X Incumbent.

=== 1930 Federal Election: Calgary West ===
Federal Election, 1930: Calgary West, Alberta
Party	Candidate	Popular Vote	%
Conservative	Yes X R. B. Bennett	13,883	70.2%
Liberal	Colin Campbell McLaurin	5,887	29.8%
Total		19,770	100.0%
Source: Library of Parliament – History of Federal Ridings since 1867: Calgary West

Yes Elected.
X Incumbent.

=== 1930 Federal Ministerial By-Election: Calgary West ===
Federal Ministerial By-election, August 25, 1930: Calgary West, Alberta On the Hon. R.B. Bennett accepting an office of emolument under the Crown, July 7, 1930.
Party	Candidate	Popular Vote	%
Conservative	Yes X R. B. Bennett	Acclaimed.	–
Source: Library of Parliament – History of Federal Ridings since 1867: Calgary West

Yes Elected.
X Incumbent.

At this time, newly appointed Cabinet ministers had to stand for re-election, but it was customary for the other political party not to oppose the election.

=== 1935 Federal Election: Calgary West ===
Federal Election, 1935: Calgary West, Alberta
Party	Candidate	Popular Vote	%
Conservative	Yes X R. B. Bennett	9,172	50.4%
Social Credit	Robert Lincoln Reid	5,817	31.9%
Liberal	Peter Laurence Hyde	2,130	11.7%
Co-operative Commonwealth Federation	Henry Magee Horricks	686	3.8%
Reconstruction	Charles Thomas Galbraith	411	2.3%
Total		18,216	100.1%^{1}
Source: Library of Parliament – History of Federal Ridings since 1867: Calgary West

Yes Elected.
X Incumbent.
^{1} Rounding error.

== North-West Territories constituency elections, 1898 to 1902 ==
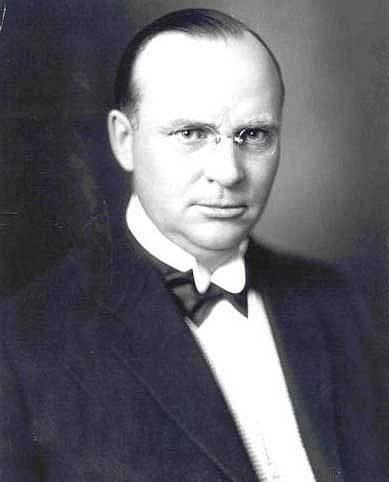
R. B. Bennett in 1901.

Bennett was elected three times to the Legislative Assembly of the North-West Territories, in the general elections of 1898 and 1902, as well as a by-election in 1901.

=== 1898 North-West Territories Election: West Calgary ===
North-West Territories general election, 1898 - West Calgary
Party	Candidates	Popular Vote	%
Conservative	Yes R. B. Bennett	291	40.9%
Unknown	W. W. Stuart	205	28.8%
Unknown	James Muir	169	23.7%
Unknown	Thomas Riley	47	6.6%
Total		712	100.0%
Source: Saskatchewan Archives – Saskatchewan Executive and Legislative Directory (SELD) – North-West Territories: Council and Legislative Assembly, 1876-1905.

Yes Elected.

=== 1901 North-West Territories By-election: West Calgary ===
North-West Territories By-election, March 22, 1901 - West Calgary
Party	Candidates	Popular Vote	%
Conservative	Yes X R. B. Bennett	562	66.2%
Liberal	Charles A. Stuart	287	33.8%
Total		849	100.0%
Source: Saskatchewan Archives – Saskatchewan Executive and Legislative Directory (SELD) – North-West Territories: Council and Legislative Assembly, 1876-1905.

Yes Elected.
X Incumbent.

Bennett resigned his seat in the territorial assembly to stand in the 1900 federal election, unsuccessfully. He then contested his former territorial seat in the by-election.

=== 1902 North-West Territories Election: West Calgary ===
North-West Territories general election, 1902 - West Calgary
Party	Candidates	Popular Vote	%
Conservative	Yes X R. B. Bennett	457	73.6%
Unknown	Thomas Riley	164	26.4%
Total		621	100.0%
Source: Saskatchewan Archives – Saskatchewan Executive and Legislative Directory (SELD) – North-West Territories: Council and Legislative Assembly, 1876-1905.

Yes Elected.
X Incumbent.

== Alberta general election, 1905 ==
The 1905 general election was the first election after Alberta was established as a province. Bennett led the Alberta Conservative Party in the general election but was roundly defeated by Alexander Rutherford and the Alberta Liberal Party. Bennett was not elected to his own seat, and the Conservatives only elected two members to the Legislative Assembly.

Alberta General Election, 1905 - Parties, Leaders, Seats Won and Popular Vote
Party	Leaders	Seats Won	Popular Vote
Liberal	Alexander Rutherford^{1}	22	55.9%
Conservative	R. B. Bennett^{2}	2	37.1%
Independent Liberal	–	1	6.9%
Total		25	99.9%^{3}
Source: A Report on Alberta Elections 1905-1982 (Edmonton: Provincial Archives of Alberta, 1983)

^{1} Premier when election was called; Premier after election.
^{2} Did not win his own seat, so did not become Leader of the Opposition after the election.
^{3} Rounding error.

== Alberta constituency elections, 1905 and 1909 ==
Bennett stood for election in two general elections in Alberta, in 1905 and 1909. He did not win his own seat in 1905 and did not become Leader of the Opposition. He stood again in the 1909 election and won his seat. He again became leader of the party and Leader of the Opposition. He resigned in 1910 to enter federal politics.

=== 1905 Alberta Election: Calgary ===
1905 Alberta general election - Calgary
Party	Candidates	Popular Vote	%
Liberal	Yes William Henry Cushing	1,030	26.9%
Conservative	R. B. Bennett	993	40.9%
Independent	A. D. Macdonald	407	16.7%
Total		2,430	100.0%
Source: A Report on Alberta Elections 1905-1982 (Edmonton: Provincial Archives of Alberta, 1983)

Yes Elected.

=== 1909 Alberta Election: Calgary ===
1909 Alberta general election - Calgary
Party	Candidates	Popular Vote	%
Liberal	Yes X William Henry Cushing	2,579	26.9%
Conservative	Yes R. B. Bennett	2,423	25.3%
Liberal	Dr. Egbert	1,933	20.2%
Conservative	Dr. Blow	1,907	19.9%
Socialist	George Howell	747	7.8%
Total		9,589	100.1%^{1}
Source: A Report on Alberta Elections 1905-1982 (Edmonton: Provincial Archives of Alberta, 1983)

Note: the constituency returned two members at this time.

Yes Elected.
X Incumbent.
^{1} Rounding error.

== Municipal politics, New Brunswick ==
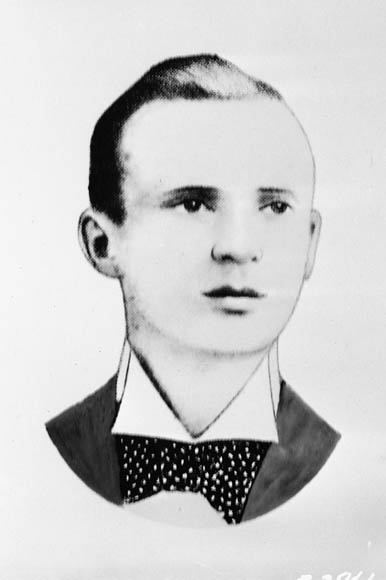
Richard Bennett as a young man.

Bennett began his political career in 1896 at the age of 26, when he was persuaded by a young Max Aitken, the future Lord Beaverbrook, to stand for election as an alderman. He was elected to the city council of Chatham, New Brunswick by a margin of 19 votes out of 691. He also served on the county government of Northumberland County, New Brunswick (1896-1897).

== Conservative Party leadership convention, 1927 ==
Bennett was elected leader of the Conservative Party on the second ballot at the leadership convention of 1927. He was the first Conservative leader elected by a convention.

Conservative Leadership Convention, October 12, 1927 Voting results by ballot
Candidate	First Ballot		Second Ballot	
Candidate	Votes cast	%	Votes cast	%
R. B. Bennett	594	38.0%	780	50.2%
Hugh Guthrie	345	22.1%	320	20.6%
Charles Hazlitt Cahan	310	19.8%	266	17.1%
Robert James Manion	170	10.9%	148	9.5%
Robert Rogers	114	7.3%	37	2.4%
Henry Lumley Drayton	31	2.0%	3	0.2%
Total	1,564	100.1%^{1}	1,554	100.0%
Source: CPAC – 1927 Conservative Leadership Convention

^{1} Rounding error.

== Peerage and the House of Lords ==
After he quit Canadian politics, Bennett retired to England. In 1941, the King appointed him to the peerage, with the dignity of "Viscount Bennett of Mickleham in the County of Surrey and of Calgary and Hopewell in the Dominion of Canada." The peerage entitled him to sit in the House of Lords.

== See also ==
- Electoral history of William Lyon Mackenzie King – Bennett's principal opponent in two general elections, with whom he alternated as prime minister.
- Electoral history of Arthur Meighen – Bennett's predecessor as leader of the Conservative Party.
