= Shirley Thompson =

Shirley Thompson may refer to:

- Shirley Thomson, Canadian civil servant
- Shirley Thompson (composer), English composer of Jamaican descent
