= Lillian Meighen Wright =

Canadian philanthropist

Lillian Wright (née Meighen; 1910 – 1993) was a Canadian philanthropist and the daughter of Canadian prime minister Arthur Meighen and Isabel Meighen.

She was married to Don Wright, a music teacher and composer that she met while attending a concert at which he was performing. Her brothers were Theodore Meighen and Maxwell Meighen.

Following her death in 1993, her husband endowed the "Don and Lillian Meighen Wright Maternity Centre" at Toronto's St. Michael's Hospital in her memory. He also established the "Lillian Meighen and Don Wright Foundation".
