= Theodore Meighen =

Canadian lawyer and philanthropist (1905–1979)

- Born: October 1905; Portage la Prairie, Manitoba
- Died: 1979 (aged 73–74)
- Relatives: Arthur Meighen (father); Isabel Meighen (mother); Lillian Meighen Wright (sister)
- Military career
- Allegiance: Canada
- Branch: Royal Canadian Artillery
- Rank: Lieutenant Colonel
- Other work: Lawyer and philanthropist

Theodore Roosevelt O'Neil Meighen (October 1905 – 1979) was a Canadian lawyer and philanthropist. He was the eldest son of former Prime Minister Arthur Meighen and Isabel Cox.

== Education ==
Meighen was born in Portage la Prairie, Manitoba. He attended the Royal Military College of Canada in Kingston, Ontario in 1925, student #1865. He studied law at Université Laval in Quebec City.

== Career ==
He practiced law in Montreal, and became a senior partner in the firm of McMaster Meighen. During World War II, he was based in Halifax, Nova Scotia while serving in the Royal Canadian Artillery. After the war he retired, with the rank of lieutenant colonel.

He established the T. R. Meighen Family Foundation in 1969.

== Family ==
Meighen married Margaret "Peggy" DeLancey Robinson in 1937. She was a descendant of American Loyalist Beverley Robinson. Their children included Michael Meighen, who was later named to the Senate of Canada. Following Theodore Meighen's death, Peggy married Senator Hartland Molson in 1990, and remains the only Canadian ever to have both a son and a husband sitting in the Canadian Senate simultaneously. She died on December 18, 2000, at the age of 85, in Montreal, Quebec, Canada.

Theodore Meighen was also the brother of arts philanthropist Lillian Meighen Wright.
