= St. Marys Cemetery =

Cemetery in St. Mary's, Perth County, Ontario, Canada

Coordinates: 43.2574°N 81.1234°W

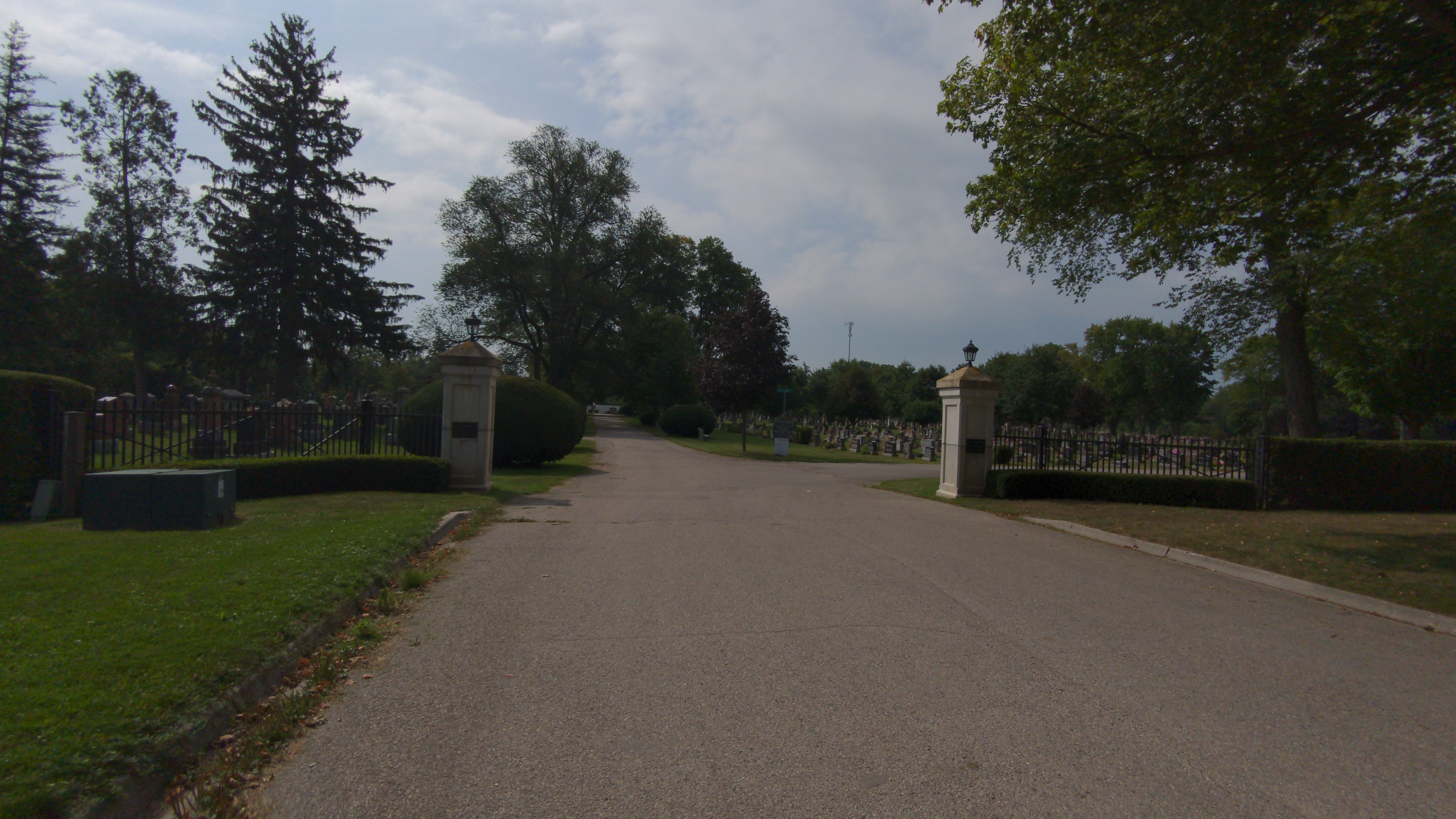
- Interactive map of St. Marys Cemetery

Details
- Established: 1885
- Location: 150 Cain St, St. Marys, Ontario
- Country: Canada
- Size: 50 acres
- No. of interments: >10,000
- Find a Grave: St. Marys Cemetery

St. Marys Cemetery is a cemetery located in St. Marys, Ontario. It is most notable for being the burial place of Canadian prime minister Arthur Meighen (1874–1960).

Other notables buried here:

- George Graham, victim of the RMS Titanic disaster in 1912
- James Brine of the Tolpuddle Martyrs
- Isabel Meighen, wife of Arthur Meighen

The cemetery was originally the site of the town's Roman Catholic Cemetery. A Protestant cemetery existed along Elgin Street closer to downtown from 1850 until 1885 when, with the cemetery full and with no room to expand, the current nondenominational cemetery was created around the existing Catholic cemetery. Some plots were relocated to this cemetery from the old, though many remained behind. The Protestant cemetery has since become East Ward Park; a plaque placed at the site by the St. Marys Historical Society commemorates it as the final resting place of hundreds of people. The current St. Marys Cemetery is divided into fifteen sections, with the former Roman Catholic Cemetery making up five sections still reserved for Roman Catholics.
