= William Herbert Burns =

Canadian politician

Member of the Canadian Parliament for Portage la Prairie
- In office 1930–1935
- Preceded by: Ewan McPherson
- Succeeded by: Harry Leader

Personal details
- Born: 27 February 1878 Stayner, Ontario, Canada
- Died: 1 January 1964 (aged 85)
- Party: Conservative Party
- Occupation: merchant

Olympic medal record

Men's Curling
| Gold medal – first place | 1932 Lake Placid | Curling (demonstration) |

William Herbert Burns (27 February 1878 – 1 January 1964) was a Canadian politician and merchant. He was elected to the House of Commons of Canada as a Member of the Conservative Party of Canada in the 1930 election to represent the riding of Portage la Prairie. He was defeated in the 1935 election.

Born in Stayner, Ontario, Burns was elected councillor of Portage la Prairie, Manitoba, and became mayor in 1921 until 1930.

Burns was named to the team that represented the Manitoba Curling Association at the 1932 Winter Olympics. That year, curling was a demonstration sport. Burns was skip for the team which took first place in the event. The Manitoba team was undefeated, winning all four of its games at the Olympics. In 2004, the team was inducted into the Manitoba Sports Hall of Fame.
