= St. Marys, Ontario =

Town in Ontario, Canada

St. Marys
- Town (single-tier)
- Town of St. Marys
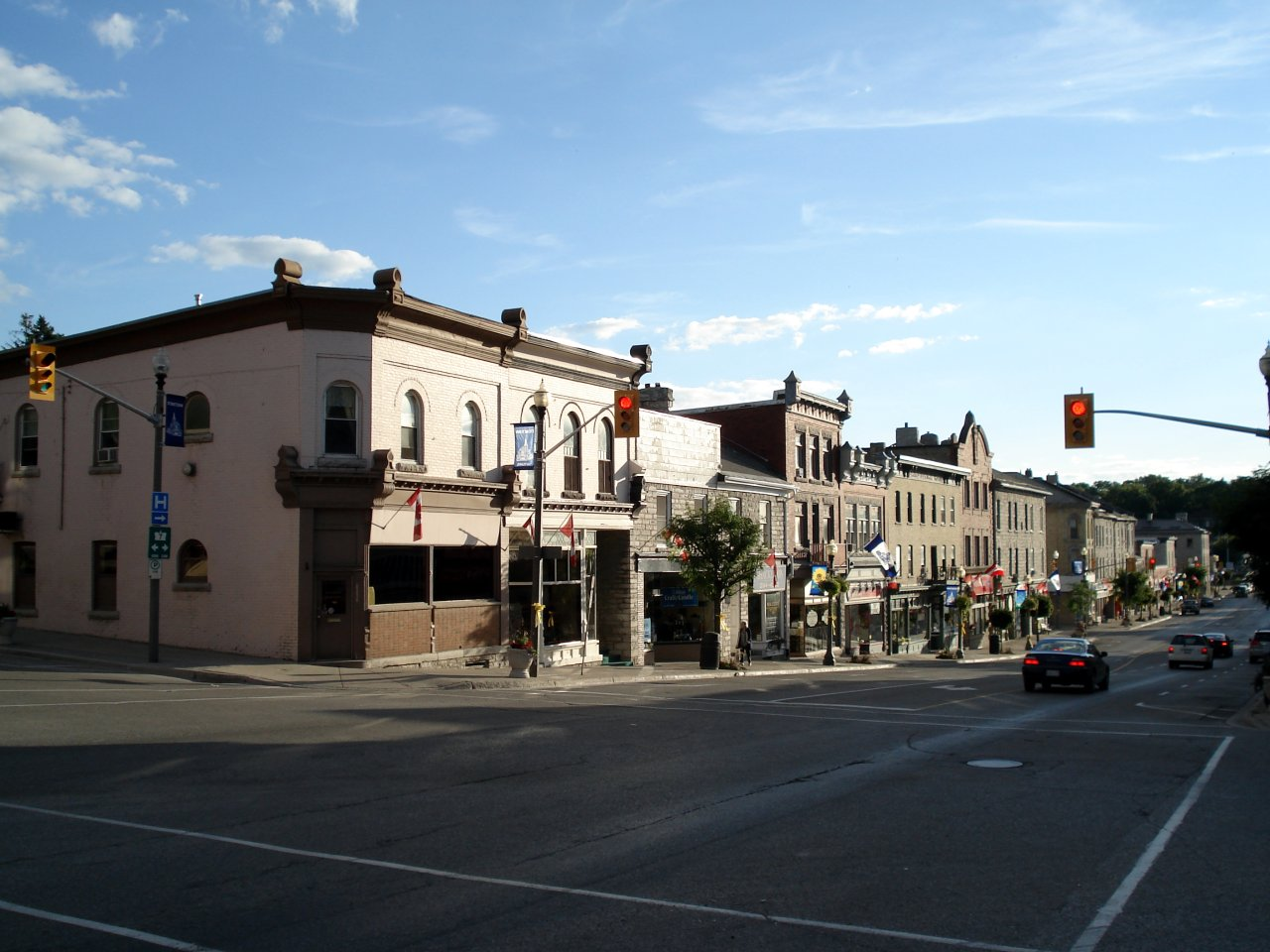
- Nickname: The Stone Town
- Motto: The Town Worth Living In
- Location within Perth County Location within Southern Ontario
- Coordinates: 43°15.5′N 81°08′W
- Country: Canada
- Province: Ontario
- County: Perth
- Established: 1844
- Incorporated: 1864

Government
  - Mayor: Brogan Aylward

Area
  - Land: 12.45 km^{2} (4.81 sq mi)

Population (2016)
  - Total: 7,265
  - Density: 583.5/km^{2} (1,511/sq mi)
- Time zone: UTC-5 (EST)
  - Summer (DST): UTC-4 (EDT)
- Forward sortation area: N4X
- Area codes: 519 and 226
- Website: townofstmarys.com

St. Marys is a town in southwestern Ontario, Canada. It is located at the confluence of the north branch of the Thames River and Trout Creek southwest of Stratford, and is surrounded by the Township of Perth South in Perth County, Ontario. St. Marys operates under its own municipal government that is independent from the county's government. Nonetheless, the three entities "enjoy a large degree of collaboration and work together to grow the region as a leading location for industry and people". Statistics Canada treats St. Marys as part of Perth County when publishing census data, and most Perth County publications do the same, at least in some sections of their documents.

The town is also known as "The Stone Town" from the area's abundant limestone, often used as a building material. St. Marys Cement, a large cement producer that was founded in the town, capitalized on this readily available feed stock, and grew to be a major producer of cement in Ontario.

St. Marys is home to the Canadian Baseball Hall of Fame. It is the burial place of Arthur Meighen, Canada's ninth prime minister. Timothy Eaton, who went on to become one of Canada's most famous retailers, opened his first businesses in Canada in nearby Kirkton, Ontario, and later St. Marys.

== History ==
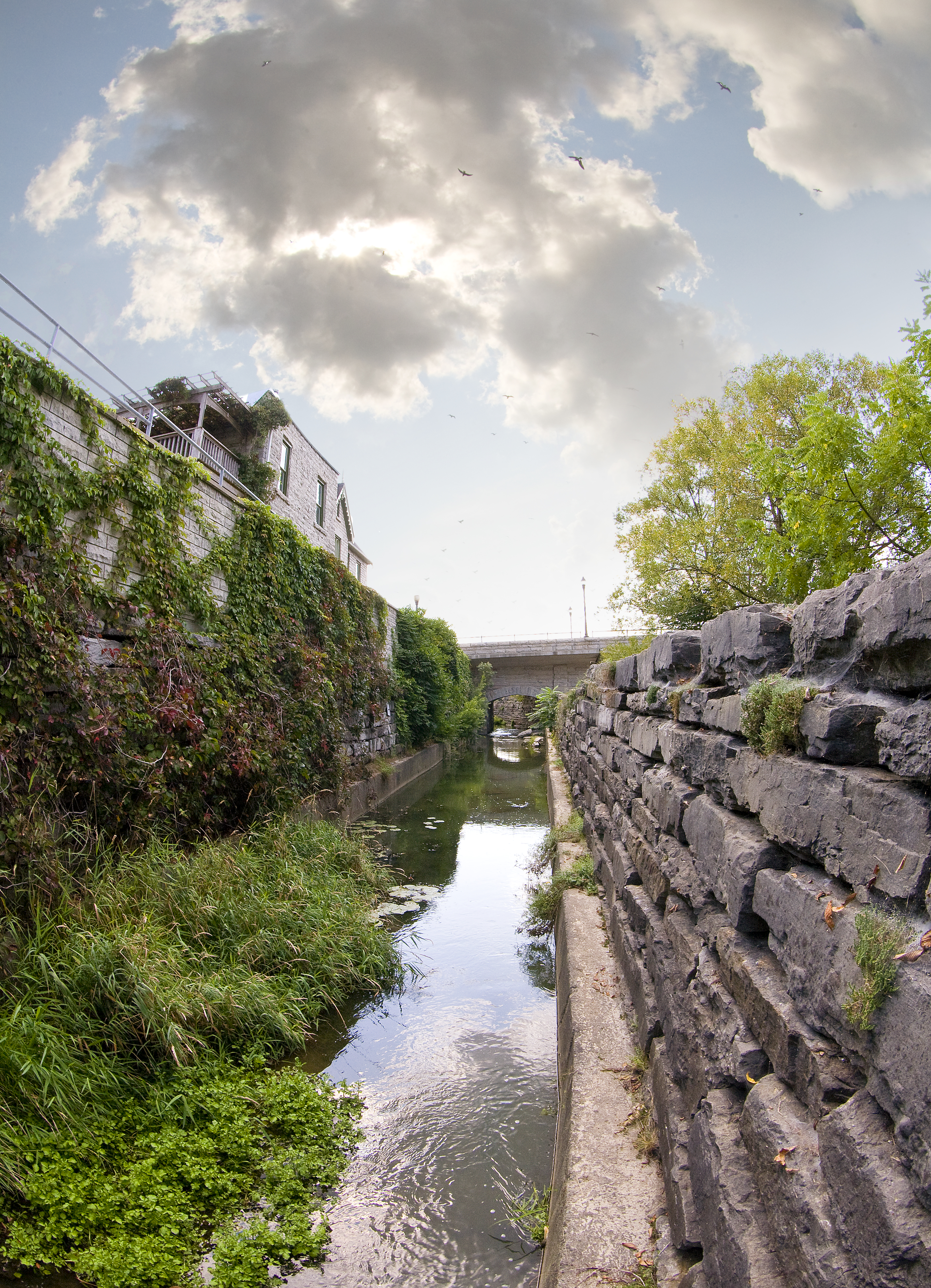
The "Mill Race," a 19th-century limestone canal to divert water from the Thames River to the mills

In 1839, the Canada Company sent a surveyor to Blanshard Township in the Huron Tract to choose a site for a town on the Thames River which would later be named St. Marys.

The first settlers arrived at the junction of the Thames River and Trout Creek, southwest of Stratford in the early 1840s, attracted by the area's natural resources. At the new town site, the Thames River cascaded over a series of limestone ledges, providing the power to run the first pioneer mills and giving the community an early nickname: Little Falls.

The Smith's Canadian Gazetteer of 1846 describes the settlement as follows:

It was laid out in 1844, and contains about 120 inhabitants. There is an excellent limestone quarry close to the village. Professions and Trades.—One grist mill, one saw mill, one physician and surgeon, two asheries, three stores, one tavern, one shoemaker, one tailor, one cooper, one blacksmith.

The arrival of the Grand Trunk Railway in the late 1850s increased the growth; the community became a centre for milling, grain-trading and the manufacture of agriculture-related products. In 1854 the community was incorporated as a village and in 1863 as a town. However, it did not incorporate itself into Perth County.

In the riverbed and along the banks, limestone was close to the surface and could be quarried for building materials. Many 19th century limestone structures survive: churches, commercial blocks, and private homes. They have given St. Marys its current nickname: Stonetown.

A plaque erected by the Government of Ontario provides additional details about the early days:

When opening Blanshard Township for settlement in 1839, the Canada Company made an arrangement with Thomas Ingersoll, a brother of Laura Secord, to build mills at "the Little Falls" of the Thames. In 1841-43 he erected a sawmill and a grist-mill and in return obtained 337 acres of land in this vicinity. The mills formed the nucleus of a settlement named St. Marys. The building of railways, 1857–60, stimulated development and in 1864, when St. Marys became a town, it was already the centre of lumber and limestone quarry industries and the adjacent prosperous agricultural region.

The first library was opened in 1857; it belonged to the local Mechanics Institute but had no permanent home and had to rent space where it could. In 1904, the Andrew Carnegie Foundation provided $10,000 for the construction of a library building. It was built and opened on August 17, 1905. By 1913 the shelves contained 4000 books. Major renovations were completed in 1988 including the addition of a new wing.

In 1908, a handle and hockey stick company was founded by Solen Doolittle in the town of St. Marys called the St. Marys Wood Specialty Company. Located on James Street in St. Marys from the early 1900s, it moved to Hespeler, Ontario in 1933. During their time in St. Marys the company made many such items as hammer handles, hockey sticks and baseball bats. After many ownership changes over the years, by 1988 the now-Cooper bat had risen to #2 in the National Baseball League after Louisville Slugger. This success subsequently inspired the town to bid for the Canadian Baseball Hall of Fame.

On January 1, 1998, Perth County was restructured by reducing fourteen municipalities to four. However, the City of Stratford and the Town of St. Marys were unaffected, remaining independent entities.

== Municipal government ==
Fully independent of the County of Perth, the Town of St. Marys has its own Mayor and six councillors including the Deputy Mayor. They meet at Town Hall on a regular basis. The Mayor for the 2026–2030 term is Brogan Aylward.

== Demographics ==
Historical populations
Year	Pop.	±%
1991	5,496	—
1996	5,952	+8.3%
2001	6,293	+5.7%
2006	6,617	+5.1%
2011	6,655	+0.6%
2016	7,265	+9.2%

In the 2021 Census of Population conducted by Statistics Canada, St. Marys had a population of 7,386 living in 3,128 of its 3,216 total private dwellings, a change of 1.7% from its 2016 population of 7,265. With a land area of 12.44 km^{2} (4.80 sq mi), it had a population density of 593.7/km^{2} (1,537.8/sq mi) in 2021.

== Attractions ==
St. Marys contains many 19th century buildings built with locally quarried limestone. Notable buildings include the Opera House built in 1880, the spired municipal Town Hall built in 1891, and the Public Library built in 1904. The Museum and Archives contains a great deal of historical information, with photographs. The Town Hall theatre offers theatrical productions and events. The Municipal Heritage Committee helps in preserving the historic stone buildings and publishes a useful brochure online, with interesting facts about those in the downtown area.

The Grand Trunk Trail is a walkway transformed from a two kilometre section of the former Grand Trunk Railway line. The trail features a walk over the restored Sarnia bridge, providing panoramic views over the town.

In 2012, the Re-Purposing of the Sarnia Bridge to part of the Grand Trunk Trail was inducted to the North America Railway Hall of Fame. The bridge was inducted in the “Community, Business, Government or Organization" class in the "National" category.

The Canadian Baseball Hall of Fame moved to St. Marys from Toronto in 1994 and opened in 1998. It is dedicated to preserving Canada's baseball heritage. Since opening, 75 members (46 players, 23 builders, 2 honorary, 4 honorary teams) have been inducted. It includes professional ballplayers, amateurs, builders, and honorary members who have helped popularize the sport in Canada. The facility also includes a baseball field designed by landscape architect Art Lierman of London, Ontario. There are thousands of artifacts on display in the museum "including Fergie Jenkins and Larry Walker memorabilia, artifacts from Canada's two major league franchises, the Toronto Blue Jays and the Montreal Expos, a Babe Ruth collection, a large display on all the current MLB Canadians and a tribute to the Canadian women who played in the All-American Girls Professional Baseball League."

Also on site, there are four ballfields, including the St. Marys Cement Company Field, Rotary Field, King Field and 3rd Field. All these fields were constructed between 1998 and 2014. Over 900 events are held on site each year, including Major League Baseball tryout camps and World Junior Championship exhibition games.

The Wildwood Dam is a dam located on Trout Creek, upstream of the Town of St. Marys.

The Quarries consist of two former limestone quarries located in southern St. Marys, one of which has been rehabilitated as an outdoor swimming pool. The area became a popular swimming spot with locals after filling with water between 1930 and 1935. In 1945 the town bought the quarries along with 50 acres (200,000 m^{2}) of surrounding land, and now manages it as a public recreational facility. The quarry is Canada's largest outdoor swimming pool.

== Transportation ==
St. Marys is located along Highway 7. The town is serviced by Via Rail at St. Marys railway station connecting it to a rail line between Toronto and Sarnia.

Bus Service is provided by Perth County Connect's 'Route 3: London - St Mary - Stratford'.

Service is provided from 8:25 AM to 5:10 PM Monday - Friday, & 9:35 AM to 5:20 PM on Saturdays.

Bus Stops in St. Marys are located at: 'St. Marys Town Hall: 175 Queen St. E' & 'St. Marys Memorial Hospital: 268 Maiden Ln.'

== Sports ==
St. Marys Lincolns game

The St. Marys Lincolns are a member of the OHA Junior "B" Hockey Association and play in the Greater Ontario Hockey League). They play their home games at the Pyramid Recreation Centre. Prior Lincoln team members who played in the NHL include Terry Crisp, Don Luce, Lonnie Loach, Mark Bell, Steve Shields, J. P. Parisé and Bob Boughner.

== Media ==
- St. Marys Journal Argus – Served Perth, Middlesex and Oxford counties, owned by Metroland Publishing. The paper published weekly on Wednesdays, with a weekend edition published on Fridays called the Weekender. This newspaper was subsequently closed down in November 2017.
- St. Marys Independent – First published in 2000, it is a weekly newspaper that publishes on Thursdays. It serves St. Marys and its surrounding area.

== Notable people ==
- Kate Rice, prospector, writer, and adventurer
- Mark Bell, professional hockey player formerly with the NHL
- Tracy Brookshaw, professional wrestler for Total Nonstop Action Wrestling
- Nora Clench, violinist
- David Donnell, poet and winner of the 1983 Governor General's Award for English language poetry
- Timothy Eaton, founder of Eaton's department store
- Arthur Meighen, Canada's 9th prime minister; born in Anderson but attended school in St. Marys
- Dan McCarthy, retired ice hockey centre
- William Milton Riley Hern, goaltender for the Montreal Wanderers; posthumously inducted into the Hockey Hall of Fame in 1963
- Kent Monkman, painter, filmmaker, and performance artist
- John G. Lake, missionary and founder Apostolic Faith Mission of South Africa
- Shirley Thomson, former director of the National Gallery of Canada and member of the Order of Canada and the Order of Ontario
- Rapley Holmes, stage and screen actor
- James Westman, operatic baritone, NHL anthem singer; Juno and Grammy nominee
- James Brine of the Tolpuddle Martyrs; born in England but buried in St. Marys Cemetery

== See also ==
- List of towns in Ontario
- List of population centres in Ontario
