= Portage la Prairie (federal electoral district) =

Former federal electoral district in Manitoba, Canada

Portage la Prairie was a federal electoral district in Manitoba, Canada, that was represented in the House of Commons of Canada from 1904 to 1949.

This riding was created in 1903 from parts of Macdonald riding. It was abolished in 1947 when it was redistributed into Norquay, Portage—Neepawa and Selkirk ridings.

== Members of Parliament ==
This riding elected the following members of Parliament:

1. John Crawford, Liberal (1904–1908)
2. Arthur Meighen, Conservative (1908–1921)
3. Harry Leader, Progressive (1921–1925)
4. Arthur Meighen, Conservative (1925–1926)
5. Ewan McPherson, Liberal (1926–1930)
6. William Herbert Burns, Conservative (1930–1935)
7. Harry Leader, Liberal (1935–1946)
8. Calvert Charlton Miller, Progressive Conservative (1946–1949)

== Election results ==
1904 Canadian federal election
Party	Candidate	Votes
Liberal	CRAWFORD, John	3,048
Conservative	BOYD, Nathaniel	2,663

1908 Canadian federal election
Party	Candidate	Votes
Conservative	MEIGHEN, Arthur	3,144
Liberal	CRAWFORD, John	2,894

1911 Canadian federal election
Party	Candidate	Votes
Conservative	MEIGHEN, Arthur	3,267
Liberal	PATERSON, Robert	2,592

By-election: On Mr. Meighen being appointed Solicitor General, 26 June 1913

By-election on 19 July 1913
Party	Candidate	Votes
Conservative	MEIGHEN, Hon. Arthur	acclaimed

1917 Canadian federal election
Party	Candidate	Votes
Government (Unionist)	MEIGHEN, Hon. Arthur	4,611
Opposition (Laurier Liberals)	SHIRTLIFF, Frederick	976

1921 Canadian federal election
Party	Candidate	Votes
Progressive	LEADER, Harry	4,314
Conservative	MEIGHEN, Right Hon. Arthur	4,137
Independent	BANNERMAN, Alexander Melville	139

1925 Canadian federal election
Party	Candidate	Votes
Conservative	MEIGHEN, Rt. Hon. Arthur	5,817
Progressive	LEADER, Harry	4,966

1926 Canadian federal election
Party	Candidate	Votes
Liberal	MCPHERSON, Ewen Alexander	6,394
Conservative	MEIGHEN, Right Hon. Arthur	5,966

1930 Canadian federal election
Party	Candidate	Votes
Conservative	BURNS, William Herbert	6,372
Liberal	MCPHERSON, Ewen Alexander	6,230

1935 Canadian federal election
Party	Candidate	Votes
Liberal	LEADER, Harry	5,516
Conservative	BURNS, William Herbert	4,043
Reconstruction	METCALFE, Wilfred	1,375

1940 Canadian federal election
Party	Candidate	Votes
Liberal	LEADER, Harry	7,442
National Government	JONES, George Herbert	4,835

1945 Canadian federal election
Party	Candidate	Votes
Liberal	LEADER, Harry	5,457
Progressive Conservative	MCCALLISTER, Allen	3,592
Co-operative Commonwealth	OGLETREE, Charles Francis	2,306
Social Credit	BAILEY, Charles Eric	857

By-election: On Mr. Leader's death, 9 May 1946

By-election on 21 October 1946
Party	Candidate	Votes
Progressive Conservative	MILLER, Calvert Charlton	4,805
Unknown	WOOD, Jaffray Smith	4,137
Unknown	COULTHARD, Sidney	2,821

== See also ==
- List of Canadian electoral districts
- Historical federal electoral districts of Canada

Parliament of Canada
Preceded by Kings	Constituency represented by the prime minister 1920-1921	Succeeded by York North
Preceded by Prince Albert	Constituency represented by the prime minister 1926	Succeeded by Prince Albert
