= Shirley Thomson =

Canadian civil servant

- Born: Shirley Lavinia Cull; February 19, 1930; Walkerville, Ontario, Canada
- Died: August 10, 2010 (aged 80); Ottawa, Ontario, Canada
- Education: University of Western Ontario; University of Maryland, College Park
- Employer(s): McCord Museum; National Gallery of Canada; Canada Council
- Known for: Civil servant
- Awards: Order of Canada, Order of Ontario

Shirley Lavinia Thomson, CC OOnt (née Cull; February 19, 1930 – August 10, 2010) was a Canadian civil servant.

Born in Walkerville, Ontario, she received a B.A. degree in history in 1952 from the University of Western Ontario. In 1974, she received a M.A. degree in art history from the University of Maryland, College Park. In 1981, she received a Ph.D. degree in art history from McGill University.

From 1982 until 1985, Thomson was Director of the McCord Museum in Montreal. From 1985 until 1987, she was Secretary-General of the Canadian Commission for UNESCO. In 1987, she was named eighth Director of the National Gallery of Canada and remained in this position for ten years, completing her mandate in 1997. During her tenure, Thomson oversaw momentous changes at the Gallery including the opening of the new building on Sussex Drive, and the implementation of a new administrative system as the gallery became a Crown Corporation in 1990. From 1998 until 2002, she was Director of the Canada Council for the Arts. From 2000 to 2003, she was the founding Chair of the International Federation of Arts Councils and Culture Agencies. In 2003, she was appointed Chair of the Canadian Cultural Property Export Review Board.

Thomson was responsible for the 1990 purchase by the National Gallery of Canada of the controversial abstract expressionist painting Voice of Fire by Barnett Newman. Both an art administrator and art lover, she believed that art was essentially for the public and should therefore be supported publicly.

== Death ==
On August 10, 2010, Shirley Thomson died of a heart attack at her home in Ottawa. She was 80 years old.

== Honours ==
- In 1993 she was made an Officer of the Order of Canada and was promoted to Companion in 2001.
- In 2002 she was made an Officer of the Order of Arts and Letters. She had previously been a chevalier of the order.
- In 2003 she was awarded a Doctor of Fine Arts, honoris causa from Carleton University.
- In 2005 she was awarded an Honorary Degree from University of British Columbia.
- During 2008, she was a Governor General's Award in Visual and Media Arts recipient.
- In 2010 she was made a Member of the Order of Ontario.

Following her death her medals were donated to the St. Mary's Museum in St. Mary's, Ontario.

== Sources ==
- "Bio of Dr. Shirley Thomson". St. Marys Public Library. Archived from the original on January 4, 2005.
