= Michael Meighen =

Canadian politician (born 1939)

The Honourable Michael Meighen CM KC

19th Chancellor of McGill University
- In office 2014–2021

Canadian Senator from Ontario
- In office September 27, 1990 – February 6, 2012
- Appointed by: Brian Mulroney

Personal details
- Born: Michael Arthur Meighen; March 25, 1939 (age 87) Montreal, Quebec, Canada
- Party: Conservative
- Children: 3
- Parent(s): Theodore Meighen; Peggy deLancey Robinson
- Profession: Lawyer

Michael Arthur Meighen CM KC (born March 25, 1939) is a Canadian lawyer, cultural patron, and former senator. He practised as a litigation and commercial lawyer in Montreal and Toronto. He is a grandson of Arthur Meighen, the ninth Prime Minister of Canada.

== Family and education ==
Meighen is the son of lawyer and philanthropist Theodore Meighen and philanthropist Peggy deLancey Robinson, and the grandson of former Prime Minister of Canada Arthur Meighen. Following his father's death, his mother was married to Senator Hartland Molson from 1990 until her death in 2001.

Born in Montreal in 1939, Meighen was educated at Selwyn House School from 1945 to 1953 and Trinity College School from 1953 to 1956. He later earned a Bachelor of Arts degree in 1960 from McGill University, where he was a member of the Alpha Delta Phi Memorial Chapter and Scarlet Key Honor Society.

== Political career ==
Meighen is a longtime friend, advisor and fundraiser for former Progressive Conservative leader and Prime Minister Brian Mulroney, who appointed Meighen to the Senate in 1990, representing Ontario. Both he and Mulroney were lawyers at the law firm Norton Rose Fulbright Canada LLP. They also attended law school together at Université Laval in Quebec City, along with other prominent Canadian political leaders such as Lucien Bouchard.

In 1972 and again in 1974, he was the Progressive Conservative candidate in the Montreal riding of Westmount, losing on both occasions to Liberal Charles Drury.

He served as national president of the Progressive Conservative Party from 1974 to 1977, during which time he oversaw the 1976 leadership convention that chose Joe Clark to succeed Robert Stanfield as party leader.

More recently, Meighen was the only Conservative senator to vote in favour of same-sex marriage. He was a member of the Banking Trade and Commerce, National Security & Defense and Fisheries committees. Meighen also chaired the Senate Sub-Committee on Veterans Affairs. Meighen was vice-chair of the Senate Committee on National Defence and Security until February 2007, when the Prime Minister's Office instructed him and the chair of the Senate Foreign Affairs Committee, fellow moderate Tory Hugh Segal, to resign their positions. Reportedly, Prime Minister Stephen Harper wished to promote more ideologically conservative senators. Meighen resigned from the Senate on February 6, 2012, shortly before his 73rd birthday (he would have had to take mandatory retirement on his 75th).

== Legal and other work ==
In the mid-1980s, Meighen was legal counsel to the Deschênes Commission on War Criminals. Today, Meighen is counsel to the law firm of Norton Rose Fulbright Canada LLP, which merged with his former firm Meighen Demers in 2001. He is a member of the McGill University Board of Governors and a director of the Cundill Funds, Sentry Select Capital Corp., and J.C. Clark Ltd. of Toronto. In January 2007, Meighen was appointed by the Canadian Government as a Commissioner of the Roosevelt Campobello International Park.

He and his wife, Kelly Meighen (née Dillon), are benefactors of the Stratford Festival. In 2004, he became Canadian chair of the Atlantic Salmon Federation, which promotes conservation efforts. He is past chair of the Stratford Festival, current chair of the T. R. Meighen Family Foundation and served as chancellor of the University of King's College in Halifax, Nova Scotia from 2001-2013.

On January 16, 2014, McGill University appointed Meighen as its 19th Chancellor, for a three-year term beginning on July 1, 2014. Also in 2014, he was named a Member of the Order of Canada.

== Personal life ==
Meighen and his wife have three sons, Ted, Hugh, and Max. He lives in Toronto.

== Honours ==
He was awarded two honorary doctorates, from the University of New Brunswick and from Mount Allison University.

== See also ==
- Université Laval
