= Harry Leader =

Canadian politician

Member of Parliament for Portage la Prairie
- In office October 14, 1935 – May 9, 1946
- Preceded by: William Herbert Burns
- Succeeded by: Calvert Charlton Miller
- In office December 6, 1921 – October 29, 1925
- Preceded by: Arthur Meighen
- Succeeded by: Arthur Meighen

Personal details
- Born: March 10, 1880
- Died: May 9, 1946 (aged 66)
- Party: Liberal Party of Canada

Henry George Leader (March 10, 1880 – May 9, 1946) was a politician, farmer, and cattle breeder from Manitoba, Canada.

Leader served as a councillor in the township of Burnside, Manitoba, from 1906 to 1912 and was reeve from 1912 to 1914 as well as a member of the executive of the Union of Manitoba Municipalities from 1913 to 1914. He then volunteered for service with the Canadian Army during World War I.

After the war, he was elected to the House of Commons of Canada as a Progressive MP representing Portage la Prairie, Manitoba in the 1921 federal election, having defeated Prime Minister Arthur Meighen by almost 200 votes. He lost to Meighen when he stood for re-election in 1925.

Leader returned to parliament as a Liberal MP in the 1935 federal election. For the rest of his political service, he sat as a backbencher supporting Prime Minister William Lyon Mackenzie King's government. He was re-elected in 1940 and 1945 before dying in office in 1946.
