= Maxwell Meighen =

Canadian financier

- Born: 5 June 1908; Portage la Prairie, Manitoba
- Died: 5 February 1992 (aged 83); Toronto, Ontario
- Education: Lisgar Collegiate Institute; Royal Military College; University of Toronto (BASc)
- Spouse: Catherine Jane McWhinnie (m. 1934)
- Parent(s): Arthur Meighen; Isabel Cox

Colonel Maxwell Charles Gordon Meighen OBE (June 5, 1908 – February 5, 1992) was a Canadian financier and the son of Canadian prime minister Arthur Meighen.

== Life and career ==
Meighen was born in Portage la Prairie, Manitoba. He graduated from the Royal Military College and the University of Toronto. He served in World War II with the Corps of Royal Canadian Electrical and Mechanical Engineers in Europe and retired with the rank of Colonel. He then took over the investment companies founded by his father.

In 1961, as chairman and director of Canadian General Investments Ltd., he entered the consortium of financiers, headed by Bud McDougald, that owned the Argus Corporation. As an Argus director, he was also a member of the boards of some of the largest Canadian companies, including Domtar, Massey Ferguson, Dominion Stores and Hollinger Mines.

Meighen resigned from Argus in 1978 when it was taken over by Conrad Black, Montegu Black and Hal Jackman. He later became chairman and director of Canadian General Investments.

Meighen died in Toronto in 1992.
