= John Crawford (Manitoba politician) =

Canadian politician

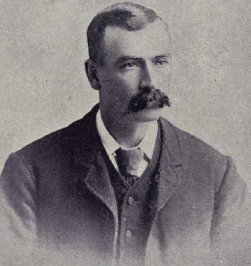

Member of the Canadian Parliament for Portage la Prairie
- In office 1904–1908
- Preceded by: Riding created in 1903
- Succeeded by: Arthur Meighen

Member of the Legislative Assembly of Manitoba for Beautiful Plains
- In office 1886–1892

Personal details
- Born: June 17, 1856 Kintail, Canada West
- Died: May 31, 1928 (aged 71)
- Party: Liberal

John Crawford (June 17, 1856 – May 31, 1928) was a Canadian politician.

Born in Kintail, Huron County, Canada West, the son of James Crawford and Catherine McGregor, Crawford received his education in the Port Albert public school, and after spending six years in a flour mill in Port Albert moved to Gladstone, Manitoba. In 1876, he took up land in Neepawa district and carried on an implement business also, until 1883, when he removed to the town and conducted the implement, lumber and grain business until August 1890 when he opened a general store.

He was elected to Council in 1884, and was, for some years, Reeve of the Rural Municipality of Rosedale. At the time of the outbreak of the North-West Rebellion, he raised a company of volunteers, which was attached to the 95th Battalion, and was gazetted as captain. He was elected to the Legislative Assembly of Manitoba as the Liberal candidate for Beautiful Plains in 1886 and 1888, but was defeated by John Andrew Davidson in 1892. He was elected to the House of Commons of Canada for Portage la Prairie in the 1904 federal election. A Liberal, he was defeated in 1908 losing to future Prime Minister of Canada Arthur Meighen.

Crawford was a Presbyterian and a member of the Independent Order of Odd Fellows. He married Matilda Hayden in 1881.
