= Arthur Meighen =

Prime Minister of Canada (1920–1921; 1926)

The Right Honourable Arthur Meighen PC QC
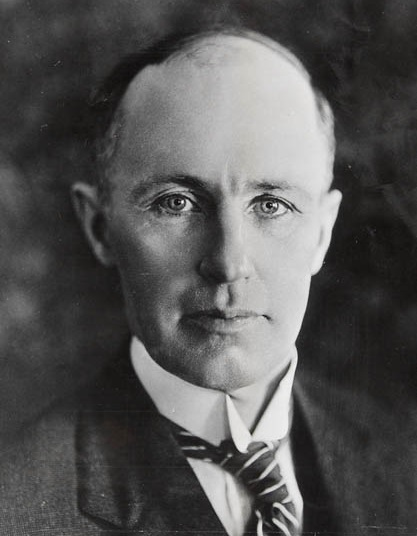
- Meighen c. 1920s

9th Prime Minister of Canada
- In office June 29 – September 25, 1926
- Monarch: George V
- Governor General: The Lord Byng of Vimy
- Preceded by: W. L. Mackenzie King
- Succeeded by: W. L. Mackenzie King
- In office July 10, 1920 – December 29, 1921
- Monarch: George V
- Governors General: The Duke of Devonshire; The Lord Byng of Vimy
- Preceded by: Robert Borden
- Succeeded by: W. L. Mackenzie King

Leader of the Opposition
- In office December 29, 1921 – June 28, 1926
- Preceded by: W. L. Mackenzie King
- Succeeded by: W. L. Mackenzie King

Leader of the Conservative Party
- In office November 12, 1941 – December 9, 1942
- Preceded by: Richard Hanson (interim)
- Succeeded by: John Bracken
- In office July 10, 1920 – September 24, 1926
- Preceded by: Robert Borden
- Succeeded by: Hugh Guthrie (interim)

Senator for Ontario
- In office February 3, 1932 – January 16, 1942
- Nominated by: R.B. Bennett
- Appointed by: Earl of Bessborough
Ministerial positions
Leader of the Government in the Senate Minister Without Portfolio
In office February 3, 1932 – October 22, 1935
Prime Minister	R.B. Bennett
Preceded by	Wellington Bartley Willoughby
Succeeded by	Raoul Dandurand
Minister of the Interior Superintendent-General of Indian Affairs
In office October 12, 1917 – July 10, 1920
Prime Minister	Robert Borden
Preceded by	William James Roche
Succeeded by	James Alexander Lougheed
Solicitor General of Canada
In office June 26, 1913 – October 3, 1917
Prime Minister	Robert Borden
Preceded by	Vacant
Succeeded by	Hugh Guthrie (acting)

Member of Parliament
- In office January 26, 1922 – September 14, 1926
- Preceded by: Arza Casselman
- Succeeded by: Ewan McPherson
- Constituency: Grenville (1922–1925); Portage la Prairie (1925–1926)
- In office October 26, 1908 – December 6, 1921
- Preceded by: John Crawford
- Succeeded by: Harry Leader
- Constituency: Portage la Prairie

Personal details
- Born: June 16, 1874 Anderson, Ontario, Canada
- Died: August 5, 1960 (aged 86) Toronto, Ontario, Canada
- Resting place: St. Marys Cemetery, St. Marys, Ontario
- Party: Conservative (1908–1917, 1922–1942); Unionist (1917–1922); Progressive Conservative (1942–1960)
- Spouse: Jessie Isabel Cox (m. 1904)
- Children: Theodore Meighen; Maxwell Meighen; Lillian Meighen Wright
- Relatives: Michael Meighen (grandson)
- Education: University College, Toronto (BA)
- Arthur Meighen's voice Arthur Meighen delivering a speech about John A. Macdonald on the 50th anniversary of his death.

Arthur Meighen (/ˈmiːən/ MEE-ən; June 16, 1874 – August 5, 1960) was a Canadian lawyer and politician who served as the ninth prime minister of Canada from 1920 to 1921 and from June to September 1926. He led the Conservative Party from 1920 to 1926 and from 1941 to 1942.

Meighen was born in Anderson, Ontario. His family came from County Londonderry, Ireland. He studied mathematics at the University of Toronto, and then trained to be a lawyer. After qualifying to practise law, he moved to Portage la Prairie, Manitoba. Meighen entered the House of Commons of Canada in 1908, and in 1913 was appointed to the Cabinet of Prime Minister Robert Borden. Meighen prominently served as solicitor general, minister of the interior, and superintendent-general of Indian affairs.

In July 1920, Meighen succeeded Borden as Conservative leader and prime minister – the first born after Confederation. Meighen suffered a heavy defeat in the 1921 election to Mackenzie King and the Liberal Party. Meighen lost his seat but re-entered Parliament through a 1922 by-election and remained Opposition leader. In the 1925 election, the Conservatives won a plurality of seats, just eight short of a majority government, but Mackenzie King decided to hold onto power with the support of the Progressive Party. Meighen's brief second term as prime minister in 1926 came about as the result of the "King–Byng Affair," being invited to form a ministry after Mackenzie King was refused an election request and resigned. He soon lost a no-confidence motion, however, and faced another federal election. Meighen lost his own seat, and the Conservatives lost 24, as Mackenzie King's Liberals re-took power.

After losing the 1926 election, Meighen resigned as party leader and quit politics to return to his law practice. He was appointed to the Senate in 1932, and under Prime Minister R. B. Bennett served as leader of the Government in the Senate and minister without portfolio until 1935. In 1941, Meighen became leader of the Conservatives for a second time, following Robert Manion's resignation. Meighen unsuccessfully attempted to re-enter the House of Commons in a by-election for York South and resigned as leader shortly thereafter. He returned to practising law afterwards.

== Early life ==
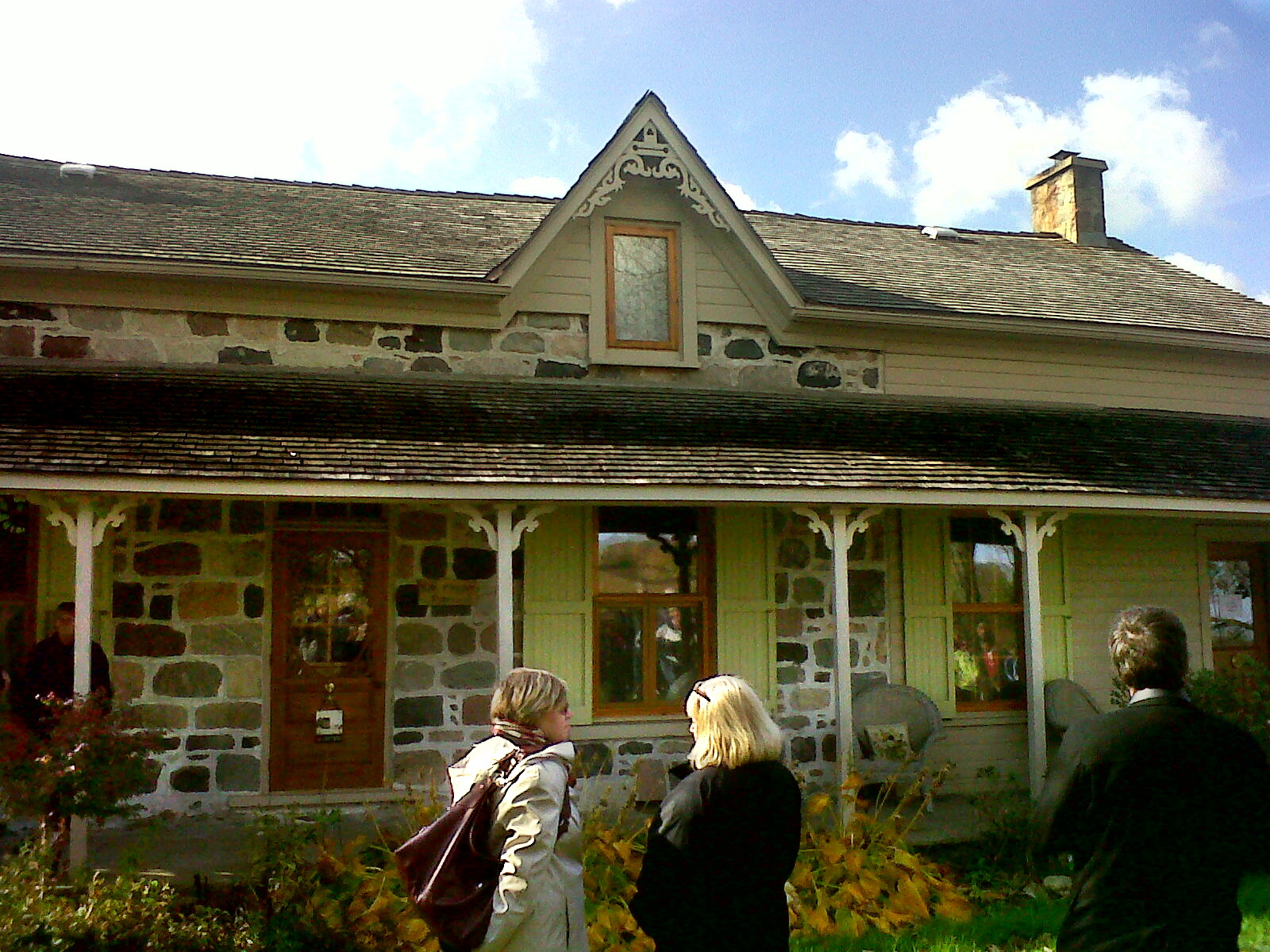
Arthur Meighen's Birthplace

Meighen was born on a farm near the hamlet of Anderson in Blanshard Township, Ontario, to Joseph Meighen and Mary Jane Bell. He attended primary school at Blanshard public school in Anderson, where, in addition to being the grandson of the village's first schoolmaster, he was an exemplary student.

In 1892, during his final high school year at St. Marys Collegiate Institute (which later became North Ward Public School before being renamed in his honour to Arthur Meighen Public School), Meighen was elected secretary of the literary society and was an expert debater in the school debating society in an era when debating was in high repute. He took first class honours in mathematics, English, and Latin.

Meighen then attended University College at the University of Toronto, where he earned a B.A. in mathematics in 1896, with first-class standing. While there, he met and became a rival of William Lyon Mackenzie King; the two men, both future prime ministers, did not get along especially well from the start. Meighen then earned his teaching qualifications from the Ontario Normal College.

== Marriage ==
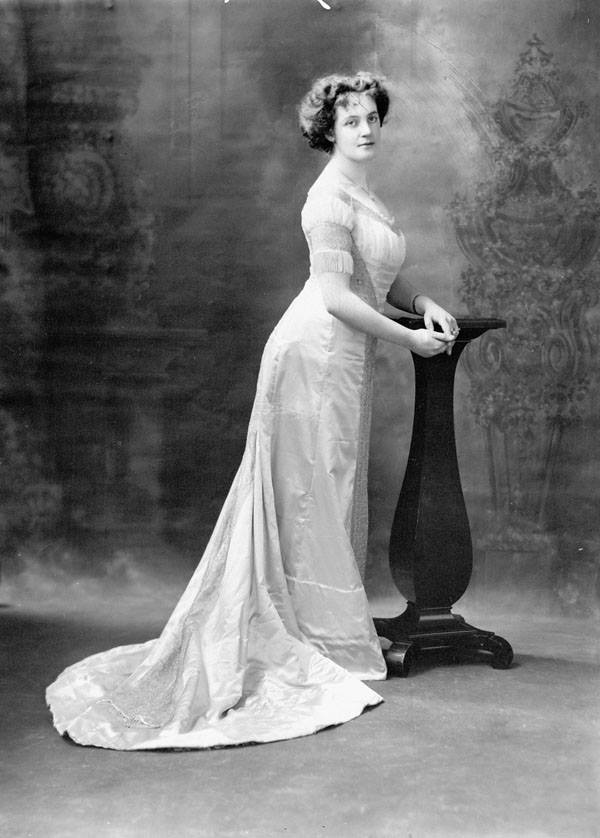
Isabel Meighen, c. 1904

Meighen married Jessie Isabel Cox, a schoolteacher, in 1904. The couple had two sons and one daughter: Theodore (1905–1979), Maxwell (1908–1992), and Lillian (1910–1993). Their grandson Michael Meighen is a Canadian former senator, lawyer and cultural patron.

Isabel Meighen died at the age of 103 and was interred next to her husband in the St. Marys Cemetery in the town of St. Marys, Ontario.

== Early professional career ==
Meighen moved to Manitoba shortly after finishing his LLB at Osgoode Hall Law School. Early in his professional career, Meighen experimented with several professions, including those of teacher, lawyer, and businessman, before becoming involved in politics as a member of the Conservative Party. In public, Meighen was a first-class debater, said to have honed his oratory by delivering lectures to empty desks after class. He was renowned for his sharp wit.

Meighen established a law practice in Portage la Prairie, and was briefly a partner with Toby Sexsmith.

== Early political career (1908–1913) ==
Meighen was first elected to the House of Commons of Canada in 1908, at the age of 34, defeating incumbent John Crawford when he captured the Manitoba riding of Portage la Prairie. In 1911, Meighen won re-election, this time as a member of the new governing party. He won election again in 1913, after being appointed as solicitor general.

== Cabinet minister (1913–1920) ==
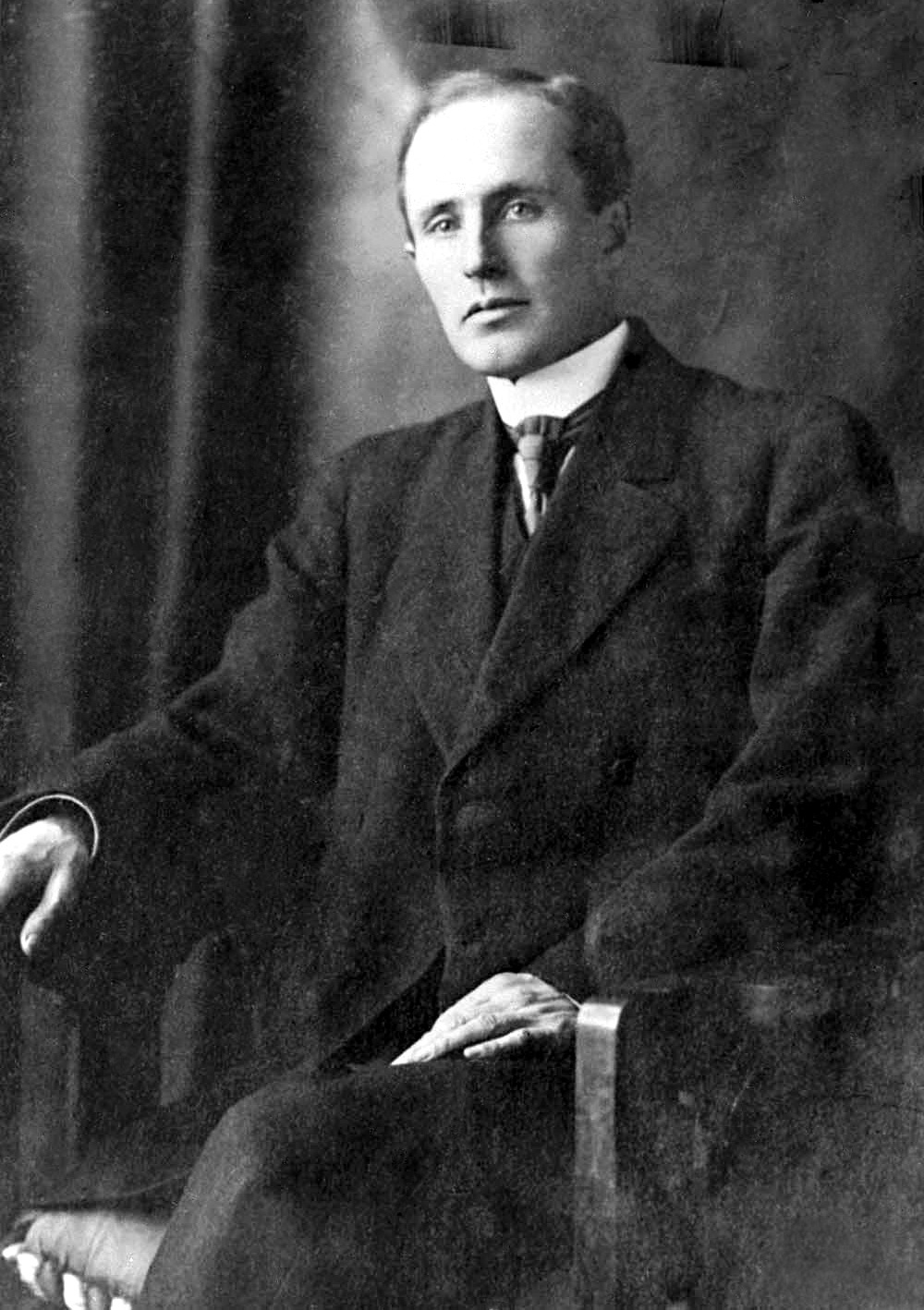
Meighen during his early years as a cabinet minister.

Meighen served as solicitor general from June 26, 1913, until August 25, 1917, when he was appointed minister of mines and secretary of state for Canada. He was responsible for implementing mandatory military service during the Conscription Crisis of 1917. Meighen's portfolios were again shifted on October 12, 1917, this time to the positions of minister of the interior and superintendent of Indian affairs.

Meighen was re-elected in the December 1917 federal election, in which Prime Minister Robert Borden's Unionist (wartime coalition) government defeated the opposition Laurier Liberals over the conscription issue.

As minister of the interior, Meighen steered through Parliament the legislation to consolidate several insolvent railways into the Canadian National Railway Company, which continues today.

In 1919, as acting minister of justice and senior Manitoban in Borden's government, Meighen helped to subdue the Winnipeg General Strike. Shortly after the strike ended, he enacted the Section 98 amendments to the Criminal Code to ban association with organizations deemed seditious. Though Meighen has often been credited by historians with instigating the prosecution of the Winnipeg strike leaders, in fact he rejected demands from the Citizens' Committee that Ottawa step in when the provincial government of Manitoba refused to prosecute. It took the return to Ottawa in late July 1919 of Charles Doherty, Minister of Justice, for the Citizens' Committee to get federal money to carry forward their campaign against labour.

Meighen was re-appointed Minister of Mines on the last day of 1920.

== Prime Minister (1920–1921) ==
Meighen became leader of the Conservative and the Unionist Party, and Prime Minister on July 10, 1920, when Borden resigned and William Thomas White declined the Governor General's invitation to be appointed prime minister. During this first term, Meighen was prime minister for about a year and a half.

=== Economy ===
Meighen's government combatted the Depression of 1920–1921. His government cut spending, resisted regulation, and minimally intervened in the economy and employers.

In April 1921, Meighen's government established a royal commission to investigate the grain trade, partially responding to calls from farmers to restore the Canadian Wheat Board that was dissolved the year previously.

=== Foreign policy ===
Believing that the economic power of the United States was the main threat to Canada's existence as a nation, Meighen advocated for protective tariffs.

At the 1921 Imperial Conference, Meighen successfully campaigned against the renewal of the Anglo-Japanese Alliance by citing that the alliance would alienate the United States and negatively affect Canada's relationship with the United States, which Canada depended upon for its security. Although the subject of unrest in Ireland was avoided at the conference, Meighen urged the British representatives to make sincere efforts to achieve peace in Ireland.

=== 1921 election ===
Meighen fought the 1921 election under the banner of the National Liberal and Conservative Party in an attempt to keep the allegiance of Liberals who had supported the wartime Unionist government. However, his actions in implementing conscription hurt his party's already-weak support in Quebec, while the Winnipeg General Strike and farm tariffs made him unpopular among labour and farmers alike. The party was defeated by the Liberals, led by William Lyon Mackenzie King. Meighen was personally defeated in Portage la Prairie, with his party nationally falling to third place behind the newly formed agrarian Progressive Party.

== Opposition (1921–1926) ==
Meighen continued to lead the Conservative Party (which reverted to its traditional name), and was returned to Parliament in 1922, after winning a by-election in the eastern Ontario riding of Grenville.

Despite his party finishing in third place, Meighen became Leader of the Opposition after the Progressives declined the opportunity to become the Official Opposition. Unlike the situation with Laurier and Borden, who had a generally respectful personal relationship despite their clear ideological differences, there existed between Meighen and King a very deep personal distrust and animosity. Meighen looked down upon King, whom he called "Rex" (King's old university nickname), and considered him unprincipled. King viewed Meighen as an unreconstructed High Tory who would destroy the nation's social peace after the traumatic domestic events of World War I. The bitter and unrelenting rivalry between the two party leaders was probably the nastiest in the history of Canadian politics.

Meighen's term as opposition leader was most marked by his response to the crisis at Chanak, in which British Colonial Secretary Winston Churchill, then serving in the cabinet of David Lloyd George, leaked to the press that the Dominions might be called upon to help British forces in the Chanak, Turkey. With Parliament not in session, King refused to commit the country to military action without Parliamentary approval, and announced that the matter was not important enough to recall Parliament. Meighen strongly condemned King's statement, and quoted Laurier's remark made on an earlier occasion: "When Britain's message came, then Canada should have said, 'Ready, aye ready, we stand by you.'" The crisis subsided within days before any formal request for Canadian help could be made, and Lloyd George's government was a casualty of the whole affair. Meighen was left with a reputation as being blindly in favour of Britain's interests.

The Liberal government of Mackenzie King was soon beset with scandal. While the uneven performance of the government and disorganization of the Progressive movement created some opportunity for the Conservatives, Meighen generally refused to change from his general philosophy of restoring the pre-war social order and returning to National Policy level tariffs. His strategy in Quebec consisted of granting Esioff-Léon Patenaude general autonomy to run a full campaign without any interference from Conservative headquarters.

Meighen and the Tories won a plurality of seats in the inconclusive election of 1925. King, as the already sitting prime minister, opted to retain confidence in the house through an informal alliance with the Progressives. Meighen denounced King as holding onto office like a "lobster with lockjaw."

== Prime Minister (June–September 1926) ==
After a scandal was revealed in the Customs Department, King was on the verge of losing a vote in the Commons on a motion censuring the government. King, before the vote, asked the governor general, Lord Byng, to dissolve parliament and call an election.

Byng, believing that the request was inappropriate considering the length of time since the election, Meighen's larger seat count, and King's uncertain control of confidence of the chamber, used his reserve power to refuse the request. King duly resigned as prime minister. Meighen, having secured a measure of support from the opposition Progressives, was invited by Byng to form a government, which Meighen accepted.

=== 1926 election and resignation ===
Because of the possibility of losing a vote in the Commons, Meighen advised Byng to appoint the ministers of the Crown in an "acting" capacity only, to avoid triggering the automatic by-elections Ministers faced when accepting their appointments at the time. King used the technique to mock the government and further his accusation that Meighen had acted irresponsibly by accepting Byng's appointment, attracting Progressive support to take down the fledgling government. The government lost a motion regarding the "acting" Ministers by one vote three days after Meighen's appointment. With no other parliamentary leader to call upon, Byng called the 1926 Canadian federal election.

Byng's actions became known as the "King–Byng Affair." Debate continues today about whether King was attacking the Governor General's constitutional prerogative to refuse an election request by a prime minister, or whether Byng had intruded into Canadian Parliamentary affairs as an unelected figurehead, in violation of the principle of responsible government and the longstanding tradition of non-interference.

While Meighen's appointment as prime minister gave the Conservatives control of the country's electoral machinery, the Conservatives' weakness in Quebec and the West continued, and Meighen faced rousing attacks from Mackenzie King and the Liberals for accepting Byng's appointment. Although the Conservatives won the popular vote, they were swept from office as the Liberals won a clear plurality of seats and were able to form a stable minority government with the support of the Progressives. Meighen himself was again defeated in Portage la Prairie. His second term lasted three months.

Meighen announced his resignation as Conservative Party leader shortly thereafter, though during his speech at the subsequent leadership convention it became clear he was attempting to rouse the floor to gain a new term. Rejected, he moved to Toronto to practise law.

== Senator ==
Meighen was appointed to the Senate in 1932 on the recommendation of Conservative Prime Minister R. B. Bennett. He served as Leader of the Government in the Senate and Minister without Portfolio from February 3, 1932, to October 22, 1935. He served as Leader of the Opposition in the Senate from 1935 until he resigned from the upper house in January 1942.

== Second Conservative leadership ==
In late 1941, Meighen was prevailed upon by a unanimous vote in a national conference of the party to become leader of the Conservative Party for the duration of the war. He accepted the party leadership on November 13, 1941, foregoing a leadership convention, and campaigned in favour of overseas conscription, a measure which his predecessor, Robert Manion, had opposed. As leader, Meighen continued to champion a National Government including all parties, which the party had advocated in the 1940 federal election.

Meighen, lacking a Commons seat, resigned from the Senate on January 16, 1942, and campaigned in a by-election for the Toronto riding of York South. His candidacy received the improbable support of the Liberal Premier of Ontario Mitchell Hepburn; this act effectively hastened the end of Hepburn's Liberal Premiership, and did not in any case grant Meighen durable electoral support. The Liberals did not run a candidate in the riding due to a prevailing convention of allowing the Opposition leader a seat. Still harbouring a deep hatred for the Conservative leader and thinking that the return to the Commons of the ardently conscriptionist Meighen would further inflame the smouldering conscription issue, King arranged for campaign resources to be sent to the Co-operative Commonwealth Federation's Joseph Noseworthy. Federal Liberal support and rising CCF fortunes ensured that Meighen was defeated in the February 9, 1942, vote.

With its leader excluded from the Commons, the Conservative Party was further weakened. Meighen continued to campaign for immediate conscription as part of a "total war" effort through the spring and summer, but did not again seek a seat in the House of Commons. In September, Meighen called for a national party convention to "broaden out" the party's appeal. It remained unclear whether Meighen sought to have his leadership confirmed or to have his successor chosen. As the convention neared, news sources reported that Meighen had approached Manitoba's Liberal-Progressive Premier John Bracken about seeking the leadership, and that the convention would adopt a platform that would move the party toward acceptance of the welfare state. Meighen announced in his keynote address to the party on December 9, 1942, that he was not a candidate for the leadership and the party subsequently chose Bracken as leader, and renamed itself the Progressive Conservative Party of Canada.

== Retirement and death ==
Following his second political retirement, Meighen returned to the practice of law in Toronto. He died from heart failure in Toronto, aged 86, on August 5, 1960, and was buried in St. Marys Cemetery, St. Marys, Ontario, near his birthplace. He has the second longest retirement of any Canadian prime minister, at 33 years, 315 days until Joe Clark surpassed him on January 12, 2014.

== Honorary degrees ==
Honorary degrees

Location	Date	School	Degree
Ontario	1921	University of Toronto	Doctor of Laws (LL.D)
Manitoba	1932	University of Manitoba	Doctor of Laws (LL.D)

== Legacy ==
The Post Office Department issued a memorial stamp featuring Meighen on April 19, 1961. In the same year, Meighen was designated a National Historic Person by the Historic Sites and Monuments Board. Landmarks named after Meighen include:

- École Arthur Meighen, in Portage la Prairie, Manitoba.
- Arthur Meighen Public School in St. Marys, Ontario. This was Meighen's former high school, reopened as North Ward Public School in 1962 and renamed in his honour in 1984. The school closed permanently in 2010. It was demolished in 2016.
- Mount Arthur Meighen 52°48′12″N 119°33′12″W, a 3205 m (10515 ft) peak located in the Premier Range of the Cariboo Mountains in the east-central interior of British Columbia. The mountain is south of the head of the McClennan River and immediately west of the town of Valemount.
- Meighen Island in northwestern Nunavut
- The Arthur Meighen Library at Toronto's Albany Club.
- The Arthur Meighen Gardens, a landscape feature at the entrance to the Festival Theatre in Stratford, Ontario.
- The Arthur Meighen Building, 25 St. Clair Ave. East, Toronto, Ontario. Government of Canada Building built in 1950s.

=== Criticisms ===
Larry A. Glassford, a professor of education at the University of Windsor, concluded, "On any list of Canadian prime ministers ranked according to their achievements while in office, Arthur Meighen would not place very high."

Meighen ranks as #14 out of the 20 Prime Ministers through Jean Chrétien, in the survey of Canadian historians included in Prime Ministers: Ranking Canada's Leaders by J.L. Granatstein and Norman Hillmer.

== See also ==
- List of prime ministers of Canada
- Mitchell Hepburn#Supports Meighen in by-election

Political offices
Preceded by Vacant	Solicitor General of Canada; 1913–1917	Succeeded by Hugh Guthrie
Preceded by Albert Sévigny	Secretary of State for Canada; 1917	Succeeded by Martin Burrell
Preceded by Esioff-Léon Patenaude	Minister of Mines; 1917	Succeeded by Martin Burrell
Preceded by William James Roche	Superintendent-General of Indian Affairs; 1917–1920	Succeeded by James Alexander Lougheed
Preceded by William James Roche	Minister of the Interior; 1917–1920	Succeeded by James Alexander Lougheed
Preceded by Martin Burrell	Minister of Mines; 1919–1920	Succeeded by James Alexander Lougheed
Preceded by Robert Borden	Prime Minister of Canada; 1920–1921	Succeeded by Mackenzie King
Preceded by Robert Borden	Secretary of State for External Affairs; 1920–1921	Succeeded by Mackenzie King
Preceded by Mackenzie King	Prime Minister of Canada; 1926	Succeeded by Mackenzie King
Preceded by Mackenzie King	Secretary of State for External Affairs; 1926	Succeeded by Mackenzie King
Preceded by Mackenzie King	President of the Queen's Privy Council for Canada; 1926	Succeeded by Mackenzie King
Preceded by Wellington Willoughby	Leader of the Government in the Senate of Canada; 1932–1935	Succeeded by Raoul Dandurand
Preceded by Raoul Dandurand	Leader of the Opposition in the Senate of Canada; 1935–1942	Succeeded by Charles Ballantyne
Parliament of Canada
Preceded by John Crawford	MP for Portage la Prairie, MB; 1908–1921	Succeeded by Harry Leader
Preceded by Azra Casselman	MP for Grenville, ON; 1922–1925	Constituency abolished
Preceded by Harry Leader	MP for Portage la Prairie, MB; 1925–1926	Succeeded by Ewan McPherson
Preceded by George Foster	Senator for Ontario; 1932–1942	Succeeded by John Bench
Party political offices
Preceded by Robert Borden	Leader of the Conservative Party; 1920–1926	Succeeded by Hugh Guthrie (interim)
Preceded by Richard Hanson (interim)	Leader of the Conservative Party; 1941–1942	Succeeded by John Bracken; Progressive Conservative
