= List of people from Prince Albert, Saskatchewan =

This is a list of notable people who are from Prince Albert, Saskatchewan whether born, raised, or have spent a large part or formative part of their life and or career in that city. Colloquially known as Prince Albertans.

== A ==
Name	Occupation	Notes	Ref
Sherry Anderson	Curler	Canadian and World Senior Curling Champion; won silver and bronze at the Scotties Tournament of Hearts	

== B ==
Name	Occupation	Notes	Ref
Mike Bales	Hockey player	NHL goalie for the Boston Bruins and Ottawa Senators	
Burke Barlow	Musician	Former guitarist for the folk band The Deep Dark Woods, 2005–2012	
Scott Basiuk	Hockey player	Has played in minor pro hockey leagues in Canada and United States such as American Hockey League and ECHL; most recently played for the Sheffield Steelers in the Elite Ice Hockey League	
Brad Bergen	Hockey player	Played his entire career in various leagues in Germany; last played 2007–08 as part of the SERC Wild Wings while they were in 2nd Bundesliga	
Todd Bergen	Hockey player	Played one season in the NHL with the Philadelphia Flyers in the 1984–85 season	
Sheldon Bergstrom	Actor	Actor in TV, film, and stage; known for Rob Ford: The Musical	
Mike Botha	Diamond cutter	Diamond cutter and educator known for cutting the Baby Rose, part of the Premier Rose Diamond and the Esperanza Diamond; creator of the Sirius Star range of diamond shapes	
Johnny Bower (1924–2017)	Hockey player	NHL Hall of Fame goaltender having played most of career in the league with the Toronto Maple Leafs; played seven games with the New York Rangers	
Robert Boyer	Visual artist and professor	Métis Cree visual artist and university professor; his abstract art was known for being politically charged	
John Ernest Bradshaw (1866–1917)	Businessman and politician	Opened a general store in 1900 and an insurance business, Bradshaw Agencies; alderman of the city of Prince Albert 1895–1905; was mayor in 1906; represented Prince Albert City in the Legislative Assembly of Saskatchewan 1908–1917 as a Provincial Rights Party and then Conservative member	
David Luther Burgess (1891–1960)	World War I pilot and politician	World War I flying ace; in 1926, was the sole challenger to Liberal Prime Minister William Lyon Mackenzie King in a by-election held in Prince Albert; ran as an Independent	

== C ==
Name	Occupation	Notes	Ref
Scotty Cameron (1921–1993)	Hockey player	Played in the NHL for the New York Rangers	
Allan Casey	Author	Born in Regina and raised in Prince Albert; award-nominated author for his non-fiction works	
Deborah Chatsis	Ambassador	Born in Chilliwack, British Columbia; raised in Prince Albert; member of the Ahtahkakoop First Nation; Bachelor's of Science in Mechanical Engineering Bachelor's of Law from the University of Saskatchewan, Master's of Law from the University of Ottawa, Master's in Public Administration from the John F. Kennedy School of Government at Harvard University; ambassador of Canada to Vietnam, director of South Asia Relations, ambassador of Canada to Guatemala, high commissioner to Belize, and Global Affairs Canada	
Lawrence Clarke	HBC official and politician	Hudson's Bay Company official, early territorial government representative and prominent local citizen considered by some to be the instigator of the North-West Rebellion of 1885; first elected member of the Legislative Assembly in North-West Territories' history	
Don Cody	Business owner and politician	Represented Watrous 1971–1975 and Kinistino 1978–1982 in the Legislative Assembly of Saskatchewan as a New Democratic Party member; mayor of Prince Albert 1994–2003	
John Comiskey	Football player	Played centre with the Calgary Stampeders in the CFL	
Adam Cracknell	Hockey player	Played in the NHL for St. Louis Blues, Columbus Blue Jackets, Vancouver Canucks, Edmonton Oilers, Dallas Stars, New York Rangers, and Anaheim Ducks; currently plays for the Bakersfield Condors in the AHL as an Edmonton Oilers prospect	
Neil Stanley Crawford (1931–1992)	Politician and jazz musician	Practised law in Edmonton, Alberta, in the 1950s and 1960s; served as an executive assistant to Prime Minister John Diefenbaker 1961–1963; served as Young Progressive Conservative Association president 1963–1964; played trumpet in a jazz band composed of provincial MLAs called the Tory Blue Notes	
John Marcel Cuelenaere (1910–1967) QC	Lawyer and politician	He represented Shellbrook 1964–1967 in the Legislative Assembly of Saskatchewan as a Liberal; member of the Prince Albert city council; mayor 1946–1954	
Ruth Cuthand	Artist	Artist, specializes in traditional craft (beadwork), drawing and printmaking	
Margaret Cuthbert	Radio pioneer	NBC Radio producer responsible for various programming at the main Radio City headquarters from 1924 to 1952	

== D ==
Name	Occupation	Notes	Ref
Rod Dallman	Hockey player	Played in the NHL for the New York Islanders and Philadelphia Flyers; career penalty minutes leader for the Springfield Indians; born in Quesnel, British Columbia, played junior hockey for the Prince Albert Raiders; currently lives in Prince Albert	
Scott Daniels	Hockey player	Played in the NHL for the Hartford Whalers, Philadelphia Flyers, and New Jersey Devils	
Ron Davidson	Hockey player and lawyer	Played with Team Canada at the 1980 Winter Olympics; graduated from Queen's University law school in 1982; played professional hockey in Sweden, Switzerland, and France for four years before starting his law career in 1986 in Ottawa; director of hockey programming for the Ottawa Senators	
Thomas Clayton Davis (1889–1960)	Lawyer, judge, diplomat, and politician	Son of Thomas Osborne Davis; he practised law in Prince Albert and later served two terms as alderman for the city; mayor 1921–1924; represented Prince Albert in the Legislative Assembly of Saskatchewan 1925–1939 as a Liberal	
Thomas Osborne Davis (1856–1917)	Politician	Father of Thomas Clayton Davis; Liberal Member of Parliament in the House of Commons of Canada representing the Provisional District of Saskatchewan; later a member of the Senate of Canada; served on the town council for Prince Albert; mayor 1894–1895; died in office as mayor when he was 60	
Guy Delparte	Hockey player	Played in 48 NHL games with the Colorado Rockies during the 1976–77 season	
Ivor Dent (1924–2009) CM	Politician	Born in Prince Albert; became a politician in Alberta; former mayor of Edmonton; former candidate for the House of Commons of Canada and the Legislative Assembly of Alberta	
Selwyn Dewdney	Author, illustrator, artist, activist and pioneer in art therapy and pictography	Born in Prince Albert, moved to Kenora, Ontario; Bachelor of Arts from University of Toronto, High School Assistant's Certificate and Art Specialists Certificate from Ontario College of Education	
Don Dickinson	Writer and author	Author; graduate of University of Saskatchewan and University of British Columbia; won the Ethel Wilson Fiction Prize in 1992 for Blue Husbands	
John Diefenbaker (1895–1979) PC CH QC FRSC FRSA	Prime minister	13th prime minister of Canada, 1957–1963	
Samuel James Donaldson (1856–1926)	Farmer, rancher, police officer, and politician	He served on the council for Prince Albert 1889–1908; mayor 1892–1894; represented Prince Albert County and then Shellbrook in the Legislative Assembly of Saskatchewan 1905–1915 as a Provincial Rights-Conservative MLA and Prince Albert in the House of Commons of Canada 1915–1917 as a Conservative MP	
Rick Ducommun	Actor	Actor and comedian, often seen in supporting film and TV roles	

== F ==
Name	Occupation	Notes	Ref
Brian Fitzpatrick	Lawyer and politician	Served as an MP 2000–2008 in the Prince Albert riding for the Canadian Alliance/Conservative Party	
Robert Fleming	Composer, pianist, organist, choirmaster, and teacher		
Harold John Fraser	Lawyer and politician	QC; practised law in Prince Albert; served on the school board and city council; mayor 1934–1938; represented Prince Albert 1939–1944 in the Legislative Assembly of Saskatchewan as a Liberal	
Gayleen Froese	Author and singer-songwriter	Released three albums, Obituary (1997), Chimera (1999), and Sacrifice (2005); wrote mystery novels including Touch (2005) and Grayling Cross (2011); her non-fiction and humour writing has appeared in publications including See Magazine, The Rat Creek Press, and The Session	
Darcy Furber	Politician and business owner	Served as an MLA for the NDP from 2007 to 2011 in the Prince Albert Northcote riding	

== G ==
Name	Occupation	Notes	Ref
Robert George	Naval officer	Commander of the Royal Canadian Navy	
Glenda Goertzen	Author and illustrator	BFA; writer of fantasy, science fiction, children's literature, and young adult fiction; known for best-selling children's novel The Prairie Dogs and City Dog	
Grey Owl (1888–1938)	Environmentalist, conservationist, fur trapper, and writer	Pseudonym of Archibald Stansfeld Belaney	
Kelly Guard	Hockey player	Signed an NHL contract undrafted with the Ottawa Senators though he never played a game; played in Europe during the latter part of his career, but retired due to sustaining an injury	

== H ==
Name	Occupation	Notes	Ref
Tavis Hansen	Hockey player	Played in 34 games in the NHL for the Winnipeg Jets and Phoenix Coyotes	
Joe Hargrave	Politician and business owner	MLA for the Saskatchewan Party for the Prince Albert Carlton riding, where he is the minister of Crown Investments and Minister responsible for Saskatchewan Government Insurance	
Ellie Harvie	Actress	Portrayed Morticia Addams on The New Addams Family	
Larry Haylor	Football coach	Retired football coach; assistant coach of the University of Saskatchewan Huskies 1971–1973 and head coach of the Western Ontario University Mustangs 1984–2006; led Mustangs to the Vanier Cup in 1989 and 1884; Coach of the Year in 1990 and 1998; one of the most winningest coaches in U Sports football history; in 2014, inducted into the Canadian Football Hall of Fame; member of London Sports Hall of Fame	
Carisa Hendrix	Magician, circus stunt performer, and fire eater	Magician and stunt performer; specializes in fire eating; also performs of under the persona of Lucy Darling	
Dale Henry	Hockey player	Played 132 games in the NHL for the New York Islanders	
Darryl Hickie	Politician, parole officer, and police officer	MLA for the Saskatchewan Party from 2007 to 2015 in the Prince Albert Carlton riding; appointed to the Executive Council of Saskatchewan as minister of Corrections, Public Safety and Policing in Brad Wall's government in 2007	
Douglas Hill	Author	Science fiction author, editor and reviewer; born in Brandon, Manitoba and raised in Prince Albert	
Randy Hoback	Politician	Elected to represent the electoral district of Prince Albert in the 2008 Canadian federal election; member of the Conservative Party	
Brooke Hobson	Hockey player	Professional ice hockey defenceman for the Ottawa Charge in the Professional Women's Hockey League (PWHL)	
Stan Hovdebo	Politician and educator	New Democratic Party member of the Canadian House of Commons; educator; served terms provincially and nationally	
Brittany Hudak	Paralympic Nordic skier	Paralympic Nordic skier in Paralympic cross-country skiing and Paralympic biathlon; won bronze at the 2018 Paralympics	

== I ==
Name	Occupation	Notes	Ref
James Isbister (1833–1915)	Métis leader	Canadian Métis leader who founded the Isbister settlement the precursor of Prince Albert; may have been the first farmer to grow wheat in the area	

== J ==
Name	Occupation	Notes	Ref
Honoré Jackson (1861–1952)	Métis leader	Louis Riel's secretary, leader of the Prince Albert Settler's Union in the early 1880s	
Harry Jerome (1940–1982) OC	Sprinter	School teacher and track and field runner who competed in three Olympic Games, the British Empire and Commonwealth Games and the Pan-American Games during the 1960s	
Victoria Jurgens	Politician	Represented the Saskatchewan Party 2011–2016 in the Prince Albert Northcote riding	

== K ==
Name	Occupation	Notes	Ref
Boris Karloff (1887–1969)	Actor	Known for his roles in horror films portraying characters like Frankenstein's monster and The Mummy; resided in Prince Albert during the early 20th century; applied to Harry St. Clair of Prince Albert's Harry St. Clair players and toured with them between 1912 and 1914 before becoming famous in Hollywood	
Marliese Kasner	Curler and teacher	2003 World Junior Champion; former member of her sister Stefanie Lawton's team	
Ralph Katzman	Politician and farmer	Progressive Conservative MLA 1975–1986 in the riding of Rosthern; one of 21 MLAs convicted of fraud	
Andrew Knox	Politician and farmer	Represented Prince Albert in the House of Commons of Canada 1917–1925	
Kirk Krack	Freediver	Broke records throughout his career; created Performance Freediving International, Canadian Association of Freediving and Apnea; founding member of the United States Apnea Association; has done film and TV work associated with freediving	
Jason Krywulak	Hockey player	Played three games for the San Diego Gulls in the minor pro West Coast Hockey League during the 1997–98 season before returning to the University of Calgary; played the rest of his career in Germany, 1998–2000	
Orland Kurtenbach	Hockey player	Played in the NHL for the Vancouver Canucks, New York Rangers, Toronto Maple Leafs, and Boston Bruins; the Canucks' inaugural captain	

== L ==
Name	Occupation	Notes	Ref
John Henderson Lamont (1865–1936)	Supreme Court justice	Born in Horning's Mills, Canada West; became a Prince Albert lawyer, Liberal politician, and Supreme Court justice	
Stefanie Lawton	Curler	Marliese Kasner's sister and former teammate; 2000 Canadian Junior Champion	
Bob Lowes	Ice hockey coach and executive	Two-time winner of the Canadian Hockey League Coach of the Year Award	

== M ==
Name	Occupation	Notes	Ref
Day Hort MacDowall (1850–1927)	Politician	Prominent citizen; elected as an MLA representing Prince Albert in the Legislative Assembly of North-West Territories in 1883 and served until 1885	
Charles Mair (1838–1927)	Poet	19th-century Canadian nationalist poet who resided in Prince Albert for several years in the early 1880s	
Chris Mason	Musician	Former bassist for the folk rock band The Deep Dark Woods	
Dave Manson	Hockey player	Played in the NHL with the Chicago Blackhawks, Edmonton Oilers, Winnipeg Jets, Phoenix Coyotes, Dallas Stars, and Toronto Maple Leafs; former assistant coach in the Western Hockey League with Prince Albert Raiders 2002–2018; assistant coach in the AHL with the Bakersfield Condors since 2018	
John Paul Meagher	Politician and developer	Represented the Progressive Conservatives in Prince Albert riding 1982–1986	
Tracy Medve	Airline executive	Former president of Canadian North	
Thomas McKay (1849–1924)	Politician and farmer	Represented Prince Albert in the Legislative Assembly of the North-West Territories, 1891–1894 and 1898–1905; brother-in-law of Lawrence Clarke, and like Clarke was connected to the Conservative Party of Canada; first mayor of Prince Albert; a Protestant Métis or Anglo-Métis; was involved in the North-West Rebellion on the side of the federal government	
Lucy Maud Montgomery (1874–1942) CBE	Author	Between 1890 and 1891 at the age of 16, lived in Prince Albert with her father and step-mother; published 20 novels, over 500 short stories, an autobiography and a book of poetry	
Blair Morgan	Motocross/snowcross athlete	Five-time X-Games gold medalist in snowcross	
Jerome Mrazek	Hockey player	Goaltender who played in one NHL game for the Philadelphia Flyers	
Wynona Mulcaster	Artist, teacher, and competitive riding instructor	Was given the Lifetime Award for Excellence in the Arts by the Saskatchewan Arts Board; helped established what became the Emma Lake Artists' Workshops; taught at Saskatchewan Teachers' College in 1943 serving as director of Art Education 1945–1948; associate professor in the Department of Visual Art at the University of Saskatchewan 1964–1977; inducted into the Saskatoon Sports Hall of Fame in 1994	
Lloyd John Muller	Politician and farmer	Represented the Progressive Conservative as an MLA in the Shellbrok-Torch River riding 1982–1991	

== N ==
Name	Occupation	Notes	Ref
Jeff Nelson	Hockey player	Played in the NHL for the Washington Capitals and Nashville Predators	
Ted Newall OC	Entrepreneur	Received post-secondary education at the University of Saskatchewan; chairman, vice-president, and CEO of DuPont Canada Inc.; vice-chairman and CEO of NOVA Corporation; University of Calgary board member	
James Nisbet (1823–1874)	Missionary and Presbyterian minister	Founder of Prince Albert	
Yvette Nolan	Playwright, director, and educator	Native playwright; writer and director of many plays; educator in the area of dramaturgy	

== O ==
Name	Occupation	Notes	Ref
Sheila Shaen Orr	Artist	Cree, Scottish, and Inuk visual artist known for her work mixing traditional media such as porcupine quills and beadwork with acrylics and canvas	

== P ==
Name	Occupation	Notes	Ref
Ryan Parent	Hockey player	Professional ice hockey defenceman who played in the NHL for the Philadelphia Flyers and Vancouver Canucks as well was signed by Anaheim Ducks	
Donny Parenteau	Country music singer, songwriter, and musician	Former fiddle player for country music star Neal McCoy; moved back to Prince Albert to start a solo career	
Denis Pederson	Hockey player	Played 435 games in the NHL with the New Jersey Devils, Vancouver Canucks, Phoenix Coyotes, Nashville Predators, and St. Louis Blues, and with Eisbären Berlin of the Deutsche Eishockey Liga to end his career	

== R ==
Name	Occupation	Notes	Ref
Nicole Rancourt	Politician	MLA for the NDP in the Prince Albert Northcote riding, elected in 2016	
Andy Renaud	Politician and real estate agent	MLA for NDP in the riding of Kelsey-Tisdale/Carrot River Valley 1991–1999; minister of Highways and Transportation; chairman of the Board of Saskatchewan Water Corporation, Saskatchewan Transportation Company and the Saskatchewan Grain Car Corporation; minister of Agriculture	
Jessica Robinson	Country music singer	Has achieved some success nationally as a country singer	
Jim Robson	Broadcaster	Radio and television broadcaster for the Vancouver Canucks, 1970–1999; inducted into the Hockey Hall of Fame, the B.C. Hockey Hall of Fame and the B.C. Sports Hall of Fame	
Terry Ruskowski	Hockey player	Centre who played in the NHL for the Chicago Black Hawks, Los Angeles Kings, Pittsburgh Penguins, and Minnesota North Stars; previously played for the Houston Aeros of the WHA; the only player to captain four different NHL teams	

== S ==
Name	Occupation	Notes	Ref
Braden Schneider	Ice hockey player	Drafted by the New York Rangers in 2020, scored his first NHL goal in his first NHL game in January 2022	
Norman Sheldon	Soccer player	Scottish immigrant, played on Team Canada in the early 1900s; member of both the Saskatchewan and Prince Albert Sports Halls of Fame	
David Steuart (1916–2010)	Politician, cabinet minister, Senator, and mayor of Prince Albert	Elected to Prince Albert city council in 1951; mayor 1954–1958; served in Legislative Assembly of Saskatchewan as an MLA from in the ridings of Prince Albert and Prince Albert-Duck Lake 1962–1977; leader of the Liberal Party 1971–1976	
John Stevenson (1873–1956)	Politician	Liberal MLA representing the riding of Francis 1908–1912; Senator representing the Senatorial division of Prince Albert, as appointed by William Lyon Mackenzie King, 1940–1956	
Josh Stumpf	Country music singer and songwriter	Charted in the top ten of the Billboard Canada Country chart	

== T ==
Name	Occupation	Notes	Ref
Richard Tapper	Swimmer	Competed for New Zealand at the 1992 Summer Olympics	
Allan R. Taylor OC	Banker	Banker; inducted into the Canadian Business Hall of Fame in 2006	
Joey Tetarenko	Hockey player	Played in the NHL for the Florida Panthers, Carolina Hurricanes, and Ottawa Senators	
Kara Thevenot	Curler	Bronze medalist at the 2019 Scotties Tournament of Hearts	
Jesse Thistle	Author and professor	Authored the best-selling memoir From the Ashes; assistant professor in the Department of Equity Studies at York University; Bachelor of Liberal Arts and Professional Studies with a Specialized Honours in History from York University in 2015, Master's of History at the University of Waterloo in 2016, and PhD in the History Department at York University	
Max Thompson	Nordic combined skier	Has competed nationally and internationally at the Olympics	
Dave Tippett	Professional ice hockey coach and player	Played 1979–1981 for the Prince Albert Raiders	
Ken Tralnberg	Curler and curling coach	Silver medalist at the 2002 Winter Olympics;coached the Swiss Women's Curling team at the 2010 Winter Olympics in Vancouver and the 2014 Winter Olympics in Sochi	

== V ==
Name	Occupation	Notes	Ref
Doyle Vermette	Politician	MLA for the NDP in the Cumberland riding; first elected in 2008	
Jon Vickers CC	Opera singer	Distinguished tenor	

== W ==
Name	Occupation	Notes	Ref
Owen Walter	Hockey player	Awarded the 2003 Brown University Charles A. Robinson Memorial Trophy for academic achievement before playing professionally	
George Weaver (1908–1986)	Politician and metallurgical engineer	Served as a Liberal MP for the Churchill riding 1949–1957	
Kaitlin Willoughby	Hockey player	Hockey player currently with the Montreal Victoire	
Rick Wilson	Hockey player and coach	Played in the NHL for Montreal Canadiens, St. Louis Blues, and Detroit Red Wings; assistant coach for the University of North Dakota Fighting Sioux hockey team, Prince Albert Raiders, New York Islanders, Los Angeles Kings and Dallas Stars; acting head coach in 2002 for the Dallas Stars; won the Memorial Cup in 1985 and Stanley Cup in 1999; assistant coach for the Minnesota Wild organization 2002–2016	

== Y ==
Name	Occupation	Notes	Ref
Dylan Yeo	Hockey player	Currently plays for the Dragons de Rouen in Ligue Magnus	

== See also ==
- List of people from Regina, Saskatchewan
- List of people from Saskatoon
