= Charles McDonald (Canadian politician) =

Canadian politician (1867–1936)

The Honourable Charles McDonald

Member of the Saskatchewan Legislative Assembly for Prince Albert City
- In office 1917–1925
- Preceded by: John Ernest Bradshaw
- Succeeded by: Thomas Clayton Davis

Member of Parliament for Prince Albert
- In office 1925 – January 15, 1926
- Preceded by: Andrew Knox
- Succeeded by: William Lyon Mackenzie King

Canadian Senator from British Columbia
- In office December 1935 – October 6, 1936

Personal details
- Born: 1867 Scotland
- Died: October 6, 1936 Vancouver, British Columbia, Canada
- Party: Liberal
- Occupation: Pharmacist

Charles M. McDonald (1867 – October 6, 1936) was a Canadian politician who served in the Legislative Assembly of Saskatchewan and in the Parliament of Canada. He has the distinction of having served in both the House of Commons of Canada and the Senate of Canada for less than a year.

== Background ==
McDonald was a pharmacist by profession. He was born in Scotland and immigrated to Canada. By the time of the 1901 census he was living in Prince Albert, Saskatchewan with his wife.

He first attracted public attention in 1918 when he assisted in the capture of two bandits sought for the slaying of a law enforcement officer.

He was first elected to the Saskatchewan legislature as a Liberal MLA in the 1917 provincial election representing the provincial constituency of Prince Albert and was re-elected in the 1921 provincial election by acclamation.

After two terms in the Saskatchewan legislature, McDonald switched to federal politics and contested the federal riding of Prince Albert in the 1925 federal election and was elected with more than 50% of the vote defeating both incumbent Progressive MP Andrew Knox and John Diefenbaker, the Conservative candidate and future prime minister.

The federal Liberals were re-elected with a minority government. Despite having fewer seats than the Conservatives they were able to stay in power with the support of Progressive and independent MPs. However, Prime Minister William Lyon Mackenzie King was personally defeated in his riding of York North and needed to find a new constituency. On January 15, 1926, McDonald agreed to resign his seat immediately after his election so that Mackenzie King could contest it in a by-election which was held a month later.

McDonald returned to his pharmacy and eventually moved to British Columbia. In December 1935, Prime Minister Mackenzie King, who had just been returned to government after five years of Tory rule, appointed McDonald to the Canadian Senate as a representative for British Columbia. However, McDonald's tenure was short lived as he died in office less than a year later. His combined service in both the House of Commons and the Senate is 361 days.

McDonald died in Vancouver after a nine-month illness.

== Electoral record ==
1925 Canadian federal election: Prince Albert
Party	Candidate	Votes	%	±%	Elected
Liberal	Charles McDonald	5,301	51.2	+20.0	✓
Progressive	Andrew Knox	2,638	25.5	-28.1	
Conservative	John Diefenbaker	2,412	23.3	+7.7	
Total valid votes		10,351	100.0		
Source(s) "Prince Albert, Saskatchewan (1908-09-17 - 1988-09-30)". History of Federal Ridings Since 1867. Library of Parliament.
