= Harold John Fraser =

Canadian politician

Harold John "Hal" Fraser, QC (April 26, 1893 – September 1, 1975) was a lawyer and political figure in Saskatchewan. He represented Prince Albert City from 1939 to 1944 in the Legislative Assembly of Saskatchewan as a Liberal.

He was born in Ottawa, Ontario and was educated there and at Osgoode Hall. Fraser served overseas with the Canadian Machine Gun Squadron during World War I. He practised law in Prince Albert, Saskatchewan. In 1923, he married Dorothy Catherine Strong. In 1957, Fraser was named Queen's Counsel. He served on the school board and city council in Prince Albert and was mayor from 1934 to 1938. Fraser was also president of the Saskatchewan Urban Municipalities association from 1938 to 1939. He was first elected to the provincial assembly in a 1939 by-election held after Thomas Clayton Davis was named to the bench. Fraser was defeated by Larry McIntosh when he ran for reelection in 1944. In 1963, he ran unsuccessfully against John Diefenbaker for the Prince Albert seat in the Canadian House of Commons.
