= Edward LeRoy Bowerman =

Canadian politician

Member of the Canadian Parliament for Prince Albert
- In office 1945–1949
- Preceded by: William Lyon Mackenzie King
- Succeeded by: Francis Heselton Helme

Personal details
- Born: June 2, 1892 Toronto, Ontario, Canada
- Died: February 17, 1977 (aged 84) Shellbrook, Saskatchewan, Canada
- Party: Co-operative Commonwealth Federation
- Spouse: Laura Rosalee Anderson
- Children: Ted
- Occupation: farmer

Edward LeRoy Bowerman (June 2, 1892 – February 17, 1977) was a Canadian politician and farmer. He was elected to the House of Commons of Canada in the 1945 Canadian federal election as a member of the Co-operative Commonwealth Federation for the electoral district of Prince Albert by defeating William Lyon Mackenzie King, then the Prime Minister of Canada, in a huge upset, the last of four times that King was defeated in Canadian politics. After serving as an opposition member in the 20th Canadian Parliament, Bowerman lost his seat to Liberal challenger Francis Heselton Helme in 1949. In honor of Bowerman's service to the provincial government of Saskatchewan, the Parliament named a lake after him in the northern part of the province in 1972.

Bowerman's son, George Reginald Anderson (Ted) Bowerman, was an MLA for Shellbrook from 1967 to 1982 and member of Premier of Saskatchewan Allan Blakeney's cabinet from 1971 to 1982, holding various ministerial positions during the period. Ted was born on the family farm in Shellbrook, Saskatchewan, in 1930, and died in a car accident on December 20, 2007.

== Electoral record ==
1949 Canadian federal election: Prince Albert
Party	Candidate	Votes	%	±%
Liberal	Francis Heselton Helme	8,916	48.2	+7.8
Co-operative Commonwealth	Edward LeRoy Bowerman	7,341	39.6	-1.3
Progressive Conservative	George Henry Whitter	2,258	12.2	-2.1
Total valid votes		18,515	100.0	

1945 Canadian federal election: Prince Albert
Party	Candidate	Votes	%	±%	Elected
Co-operative Commonwealth	Edward LeRoy Bowerman	7,928	40.99	+30.0	✓
Liberal	William Lyon Mackenzie King	7,799	40.32	−5.6	
Progressive Conservative	Walter Hemming Nelson	2,768	14.31		
Social Credit	Joshua Norman Haldeman	847	4.38		
Total valid votes		19,342	100.0		
Source(s) "Prince Albert, Saskatchewan (1908-09-17 - 1988-09-30)". History of Federal Ridings Since 1867. Library of Parliament.
