= Lon Borgerson =

Canadian provincial politician

MLA for Saskatchewan Rivers
- In office November 5, 2003 – November 20, 2007
- Preceded by: Daryl Wiberg
- Succeeded by: Nadine Wilson

Personal details
- Born: November 19, 1950 (age 75) Rockglen, Saskatchewan, Canada
- Party: New Democratic Party

Lon David Borgerson (born November 19, 1950) is a Canadian provincial politician. He was the Saskatchewan New Democratic Party member of the Legislative Assembly of Saskatchewan for the constituency of Saskatchewan Rivers from 2003 to 2007. After his defeat in 2007, he stood as the federal New Democratic Party candidate for Prince Albert in the 2015 federal election, and later as the Saskatchewan New Democratic Party candidate for Batoche in the 2020 Saskatchewan election.

== Electoral record ==
2020 Saskatchewan general election: Batoche
Party	Candidate	Votes	%	±%
Saskatchewan	Delbert Kirsch	4,357	65.28	+0.53
New Democratic	Lon Borgerson	1,811	27.14	-3.47
Progressive Conservative	Carrie Harris	350	5.24	–
Green	Hamish Graham	156	2.34	+0.85
Total valid votes		6,674	99.43	
Total rejected ballots		38	0.57	–
Turnout		6,712	–	–
Eligible voters		–		
Saskatchewan hold		Swing		–
Source: Elections Saskatchewan

2015 Canadian federal election: Prince Albert
Party	Candidate	Votes	%	±%	Expenditures
Conservative	Randy Hoback	19,673	49.79	-12.63	$150,007.16
New Democratic	Lon Borgerson	11,244	28.46	-3.03	$73,259.98
Liberal	Gordon Kirkby	7,832	19.82	+16.38	$10,644.06
Green	Byron Tenkink	761	1.93	-0.29	$422.40
Total valid votes/expense limit		39,510	100.0		$210,065.49
Total rejected ballots		103	–	–	
Turnout		39,613	–	–	
Eligible voters		55,873			
Source: Elections Canada

2007 Saskatchewan general election
Party	Candidate	Votes	%	±%
Saskatchewan	Nadine Wilson	4,294	54.92	+15.75
NDP	Lon Borgerson	3,221	41.19	-6.46
Liberal	Alyssa Fullerton	304	3.89	-6.69
Total		7,819	100.00%	

2003 Saskatchewan general election
Party	Candidate	Votes	%	±%
NDP	Lon Borgerson	3,446	47.65	+5.07
Saskatchewan	Daryl Wiberg	2,833	39.17	-5.71
Liberal	Cliff Rose	765	10.58	-1.96
New Green	Gerald Regnitter	188	2.60	*
Total		7,232	100.00%	
