= Ray Funk =

Canadian politician

Raymond John Funk (born 13 February 1948) was a Member of Parliament (MP) in the House of Commons of Canada from Saskatchewan. He represented Prince Albert—Churchill River and was a member of the New Democratic Party. Funk won his seat in the 1988 election. He easily defeated Progressive Conservative Party of Canada candidate J.J. Cennon with 17,915 votes (almost 9,000 more than Cennon).

Funk was born in Saskatoon, Saskatchewan. As a politician, Funk was heavily involved in peace issues. Funk addressed the United Nations in 1990 on East Timor. He was only the second Canadian MP to do so. In 1993, Funk tabled C-414, a bill that would have established a "Peace Fund" for taxpayers who did not want their money going to the military. The bill "died on the order paper" when the House of Commons was dissolved two days before debate was set to begin on the bill.

Funk made an unsuccessful run in 1997 to return to the House of Commons. Funk came in second in the new riding of Prince Albert. He received 10,418 votes (31.7%), 2,090 votes behind Reform Party candidate Derek Konrad. He ran again in Churchill River in the 2000 election. He was again unsuccessful, coming in third with 5,141 votes. Liberal Rick Laliberte won the seat.

In 2001, Funk supported Buckley Belanger in his unsuccessful run to lead the Saskatchewan New Democratic Party. He also endorsed Bill Blaikie the NDP leadership election in 2003. Funk now is a managing partner of the Spruce River Research Farm near Prince Albert, Saskatchewan. In 2005, he was a recipient of the Saskatchewan Centennial Medal.

== Electoral record ==
1997 Canadian federal election: Prince Albert
Party	Candidate	Votes	%	±%	Expenditures
Reform	Derrek Konrad	12,508	38.1	–	$55,562
New Democratic	Ray Funk	10,418	31.7	–	$59,376
Liberal	Gordon Kirkby	6,965	21.2	–	$37,643
Progressive Conservative	Brian Fripp	2,702	8.2	–	$13,911
Canadian Action	John Hrapchak	275	0.8	–	
Total valid votes		32,868	100.0		–
Total rejected ballots		107	0.3		
Turnout		32,975	64.5		

1993 Canadian federal election: Prince Albert—Churchill River
Party	Candidate	Votes
Liberal	Gordon Kirkby	11,589
New Democratic	Ray Funk	9,031
Reform	J. Paul Meagher	5,694
Independent	Rick V. Laliberte	1,499
Progressive Conservative	Joyce Middlebrook	1,412
National	Brian Baker	442
Canada Party	Donald Kavanagh	125
Independent	Richard Arthur Potratz	79

Parliament of Canada
Preceded by The electoral district was created in 1987.	Member of Parliament for Prince Albert—Churchill River; 1988–1993	Succeeded by Gordon Kirkby
