= Omer Alphonse Demers =

Canadian politician

- Born: 2 March 1893 in Ham-Nord, Quebec
- Died: February 8, 1969
- Resting place: Esquimalt
- Spouse(s): Lucie Anne Larose, 1913

Omer Alphonse Demers (March 2, 1893 – February 8, 1969) was a general merchant and political figure in Saskatchewan. He represented Shellbrook from 1934 to 1944 in the Legislative Assembly of Saskatchewan as a Liberal.

He was born in Ham-Nord, Quebec, the son of Alfred Demers and Rose Anna Dufresne, and was educated in Victoriaville. In 1912, his father and mother moved to Debden, Saskatchewan; they were one of the first families to settle in the area. They convinced Omer and his brother Adelbert to move to Debden. The two brothers arrived with a boxcar full of supplies and, soon after arriving, built a store which included living quarters. In 1914, Omer married Lucienne Larose. With his business going well, he soon built a larger store and residence. Demers helped open the first school in the town in 1915 and helped establish a Catholic parish. He also served as postmaster from 1912 to 1919. In 1920, Demers became the first mayor of Debden. He sold the store after his wife developed tuberculosis. After she recovered, she opened a women's clothing store in Debden. Demers took up ranching and then muskrat ranching; both ventures were not successful.

He was defeated by Albert Victor Sterling when he ran for reelection to the assembly in 1944.

In 1945, Demers moved to British Columbia. He died in Esquimalt at the age of 75.
