= William Winfield Rutan =

Canadian politician

William Winfield Rutan (March 28, 1865 – May 9, 1937) was an American-born merchant and political figure in Saskatchewan, Canada. He represented Prince Albert in the House of Commons of Canada from 1908 to 1911 as a Liberal.

He was born in Le Sueur, Minnesota, the son of Andrew Rutan, a Canadian by birth. Rutan was educated in Mankato, Minnesota, and Battle Creek, Michigan and came to Canada in 1897, settling in Melfort, Saskatchewan. In 1890, he had married Josie Lasley. He was defeated when he ran for reelection in 1911.

== Electoral record ==
1911 Canadian federal election: Prince Albert
Party	Candidate	Votes	%	±%
Conservative	James McKay	3,316	52.8	+6.1
Liberal	William Winfield Rutan	2,961	47.2	-4.2
Total valid votes		6,277	100.0	

1908 Canadian federal election: Prince Albert
Party	Candidate	Votes	%
Liberal	William Winfield Rutan	2,413	51.4
Conservative	James McKay	2,194	46.7
Independent Liberal	W.H. Joseph Jaxon	87	1.9
Total valid votes		4,694	100.0
