= John Thiessen =

Canadian farmer and politician

John Thiessen (February 23, 1906–March 25, 1978) was a farmer and political figure in Saskatchewan. He represented Shellbrook from 1956 to 1964 in the Legislative Assembly of Saskatchewan as a Co-operative Commonwealth Federation (CCF) member.

He was born in Aberdeen, Saskatchewan, the son of J.J. Thiessen, of Dutch descent, and was educated there. In 1929, Thiessen married Maria Loeppky; they lived in Canwood. Thiessen served as secretary-treasurer and reeve for the rural municipality of Canwood, as a justice of the peace, as a founding member of the Canwood community health clinic and as president and treasurer of the Aberdeen Board of Trade. He ran unsuccessfully for the Rosthern seat in the provincial assembly in 1952. He was defeated by John Cuelenaere when he ran for reelection to the assembly in 1964.
