= Samuel James Donaldson =

Canadian politician

Member of the Legislative Assembly of Saskatchewan
- In office 2 April 1907 – 1908
- Preceded by: Peter Tyerman
- Succeeded by: riding redistributed
- Constituency: Prince Albert (County)
- In office 1908–1915
- Preceded by: first member
- Succeeded by: Edgar Sidney Clinch
- Constituency: Shellbrook

Member of the House of Commons of Canada
- In office 1915–1917
- Preceded by: James McKay
- Succeeded by: Andrew Knox
- Constituency: Prince Albert

Personal details
- Born: 12 March 1856 Appleton, Canada West
- Died: 14 March 1926 (aged 70)
- Party: Provincial Rights, Conservative

Samuel James Donaldson (12 March 1856 – 14 March 1926) was a farmer, rancher, police officer and political figure in Saskatchewan, Canada. He represented Prince Albert County and then Shellbrook in the Legislative Assembly of Saskatchewan from 1907 to 1915 as a Provincial Rights-Conservative MLA and Prince Albert in the House of Commons of Canada from 1915 to 1917 as a Conservative MP.

He was born in Appleton, Canada West, the son of Samuel Donaldson. After completing his education, he worked as a clerk in a furniture store in Ottawa. In 1876, joined the North-West Mounted Police and travelled west to Pelly, Saskatchewan. Donaldson was a member of the force from 1876 to 1882, serving in Battleford, Prince Albert and Qu'Appelle. He served as a captain in the Prince Albert Volunteers during the North-West Rebellion. After he retired from the Mounted Police, he entered the livery business. In 1882, he married Jessie Paterson.

Donaldson served on the council for Prince Albert from 1889 to 1908 and was mayor from 1892 to 1894. He ran in the 1905 Saskatchewan general election as a Provincial Rights Party candidate in Prince Albert, and was initially declared to have lost the seat to Peter Tyerman of the Liberals, although Donaldson was ultimately awarded the seat in April 1907 after legal wrangling over purported election irregularities.

He held the Legislative Assembly seat until 1915, when he was elected to the House of Commons in a 1915 by-election held after James McKay was named to the bench. During World War I, Donaldson was lieutenant-colonel for the 188th Battalion, Canadian Expeditionary Force.

== Electoral record ==
1905 Saskatchewan general election: Prince Albert electoral district
Party	Candidate	Votes	%	±%
Liberal	Peter Tyerman^{*}	411	56.53%	–
Provincial Rights	Samuel James Donaldson	316	43.47%	–
Total		727	100.00%	

Note: ^{*}In 1907, by order of the Legislative Assembly, 151 votes for Tyerman were "set aside" and Donaldson was declared elected.

1908 Saskatchewan general election: Prince Albert County
Party	Candidate	Votes	%	±%
Provincial Rights	Samuel James Donaldson	447	62.17%	+18.70
Liberal	Andrew Knox	272	37.83%	-18.70
Total		719	100.00%	

1912 Saskatchewan general election: Shellbrook electoral district
Party	Candidate	Votes	%	±%
Conservative	Samuel James Donaldson	478	58.22%	-3.95
Liberal	Alexander McOwan	343	41.78%	+3.95
Total		821	100.00%	

By-election on 1 February 1915 On Mr. McKay being appointed Judge, 16 December 1914
Party	Candidate	Votes
Conservative	Samuel James Donaldson	acclaimed
