= Jack Langford =

Canadian politician

MLA for Shellbrook-Torch River
- In office 1991–1999
- Preceded by: Lloyd Muller
- Succeeded by: riding dissolved

MLA for Saskatchewan Rivers
- In office 1995–1999
- Preceded by: new office
- Succeeded by: Daryl Wiberg

Personal details
- Born: February 18, 1944 Kalyna, Saskatchewan
- Died: February 25, 2024 (aged 80)
- Party: Saskatchewan New Democratic Party

John Fenton Langford (February 18, 1944 – February 25, 2024) was a Canadian politician who served in the Legislative Assembly of Saskatchewan from 1991 to 1999, as a NDP member for the constituency of Shellbrook-Torch River.
