= Ted Bowerman =

Canadian politician

- Born: November 3, 1930; Shellbrook, Saskatchewan
- Died: December 20, 2007 (aged 74); Alberta
- Occupation: farmer & civil servant
- Parent(s): Edward LeRoy Bowerman and Laura Rosalee Anderson

George Reginald Anderson "Ted" Bowerman (November 3, 1930 – December 20, 2007) was a farmer, civil servant and political figure in Saskatchewan. He represented Shellbrook from 1967 to 1982 in the Legislative Assembly of Saskatchewan as a New Democratic Party (NDP) member.

He was born north of Shellbrook, Saskatchewan in 1930, the son of Edward LeRoy Bowerman and Laura Rosalee Anderson, and was educated in local schools and by taking correspondence courses. In 1959, Bowerman married Dagmar Alma Louise Christiansen. He farmed and was also employed in the Saskatchewan public service. Bowerman also served as chair of the Prince Albert Community Health Clinic Board. He served in the provincial cabinet as Minister responsible for Indians and Métis, as Minister of Mineral Resources, as Minister of Natural Resources and as Minister of Environment. Bowerman was defeated by Lloyd Muller when he ran for reelection to the Saskatchewan assembly in 1982 and again in 1986.

He died in a car crash in Alberta at the age of 77.
