= Gordon Kirkby =

Canadian politician

Member of Parliament for Prince Albert—Churchill River
- In office 26 October 1993 – 1 June 1997
- Preceded by: Ray Funk
- Succeeded by: Derrek Konrad

Personal details
- Born: 26 November 1958 (age 67) Melfort, Saskatchewan, Canada
- Party: Liberal
- Profession: Lawyer

Gordon Kirkby (born 26 September 1958) was a member of the House of Commons of Canada for the riding of Prince Albert—Churchill River from 1993 to 1997.

== History ==
Kirkby was first elected to Prince Albert City Council as an alderman in October 1985. Kirkby was mayor of his home town Prince Albert from 1988 until 1993, when he won the riding of Prince Albert—Churchill River in the 1993 federal election as a member of the Liberal party. He was the Parliamentary Secretary to the Minister of Justice and Attorney General of Canada from 23 February 1996 to 1 June 1997. Kirkby lost to Reform party candidate Derrek Konrad in the 1997 election, finishing third in the riding, which had been restructured as Prince Albert.

After he left Canadian politics, Kirkby moved to Winnipeg, Manitoba and began a consulting career. He made an unsuccessful bid to become Winnipeg's mayor in the 2004 by-election.

Gordon Kirkby moved back to Prince Albert in June 2005 and started up his own law firm. Kirkby took on a partner later on in Philip Fourie, making their law firm Kirkby Fourie Law.

In the 2015 Canadian federal election, Kirkby attempted a federal political comeback in the riding of Prince Albert, which was unsuccessful. Running against Conservative incumbent Randy Hoback, Kirkby placed third.

== Personal life ==
Kirkby is married to author Mary-Ann Kirkby.

== Electoral record ==
2015 Canadian federal election: Prince Albert
Party	Candidate	Votes	%	±%	Expenditures
Conservative	Randy Hoback	19,673	49.79	-12.63	$150,007.16
New Democratic	Lon Borgerson	11,244	28.46	-3.03	$73,259.98
Liberal	Gordon Kirkby	7,832	19.82	+16.38	$10,644.06
Green	Byron Tenkink	761	1.93	-0.29	$422.40
Total valid votes/expense limit		39,510	100.0		$210,065.49
Total rejected ballots		103	–	–	
Turnout		39,613	–	–	
Eligible voters		55,873			
Source: Elections Canada

1997 Canadian federal election: Prince Albert
Party	Candidate	Votes	%	±%	Expenditures
Reform	Derrek Konrad	12,508	38.1	–	$55,562
New Democratic	Ray Funk	10,418	31.7	–	$59,376
Liberal	Gordon Kirkby	6,965	21.2	–	$37,643
Progressive Conservative	Brian Fripp	2,702	8.2	–	$13,911
Canadian Action	John Hrapchak	275	0.8	–	
Total valid votes		32,868	100.0		–
Total rejected ballots		107	0.3		
Turnout		32,975	64.5		

1993 Canadian federal election: Prince Albert—Churchill River
Party	Candidate	Votes
Liberal	Gordon Kirkby	11,589
New Democratic	Ray Funk	9,031
Reform	J. Paul Meagher	5,694
Independent	Rick V. Laliberte	1,499
Progressive Conservative	Joyce Middlebrook	1,412
National	Brian Baker	442
Canada Party	Donald Kavanagh	125
Independent	Richard Arthur Potratz	79

Parliament of Canada
Preceded by Ray Funk	Member of Parliament for Prince Albert—Churchill River; 1993–1997	Succeeded by The electoral district was abolished in 1996.
