= Mary-Ann Kirkby =

Canadian author (born 1959)

- Born: 1959 (age 66–67)
- Occupation: Author
- Notable work: I Am Hutterite; Secrets of a Hutterite Kitchen

Mary-Ann Kirkby (born 1959) is a Canadian author who has written two memoirs about her upbringing in the Hutterite tradition.

== Early life ==
Kirkby was born on a Hutterite colony in Manitoba to Ronald and Mary Dornn. Her family left the colony in 1969 when Kirkby was ten years old due to a conflict between Kirkby's father and the colony's head minister. Kirkby studied broadcast journalism in college, eventually becoming a television reporter and singer.

== Books ==
Kirkby has written two books about her Hutterite upbringing. I Am Hutterite was originally self-published in 2007, earning enough commercial and critical success to lead to a 2010 re-release by publishers Key Porter Books in Canada and Thomas Nelson in the United States. The follow-up, Secrets of a Hutterite Kitchen, was published in 2014. Kirkby won the 2007 Saskatchewan Book Award for Non-fiction and the Gold Prize for Best Culinary Narrative at the 2015 Taste Canada Food Writing Awards. Kirkby has also co-written a children's book entitled Make a Rabbit, which she self-published in 2010.

== Personal life ==
She is married to Gordon Kirkby, a politician.
