= James Fitz-Morris =

British aviator (1897–1918)

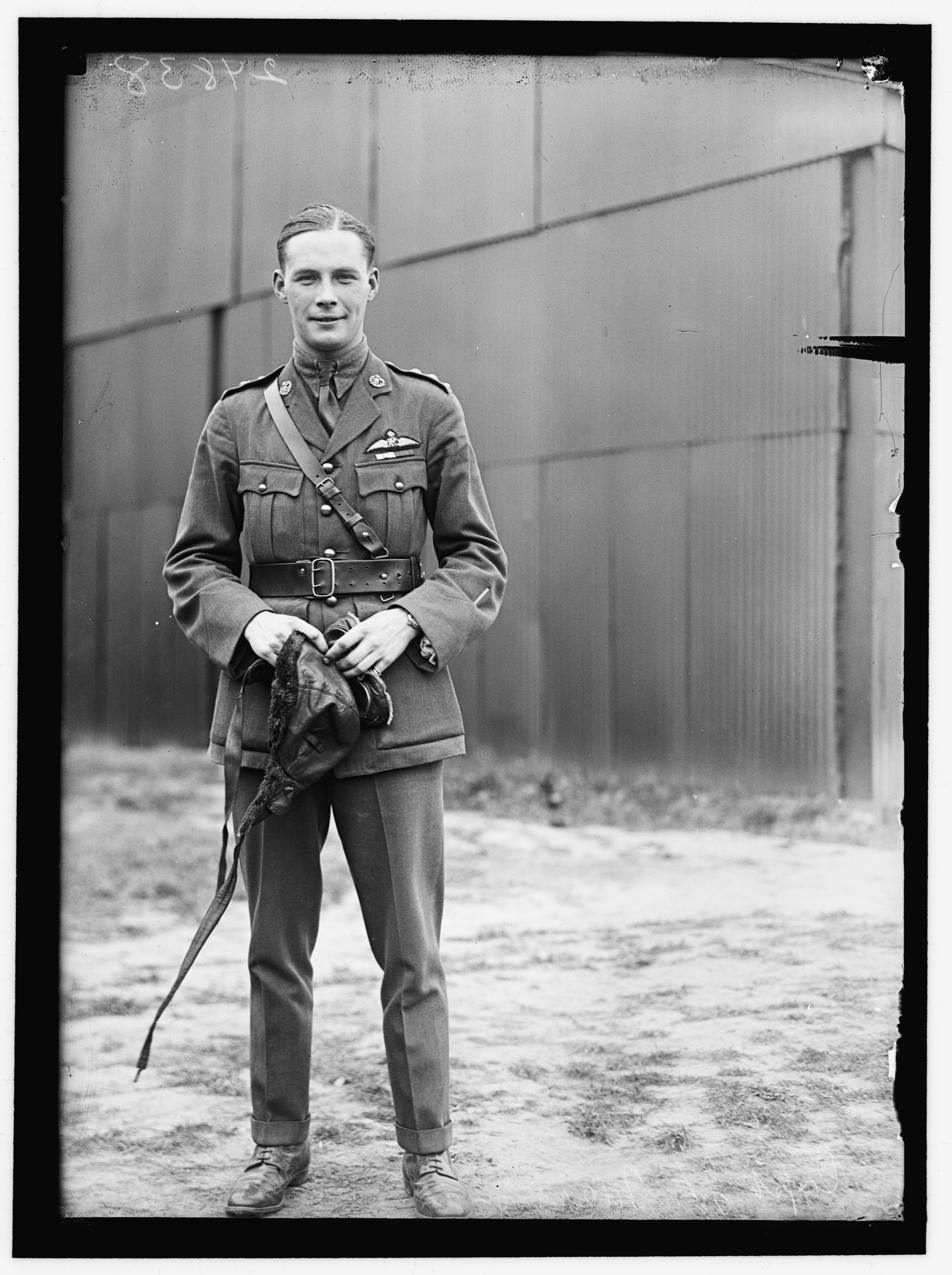
- Capt. J.F. Morris in 1917
- Born: 6 April 1897; Polmont, Falkirk, Scotland
- Died: 14 August 1918 (aged 21); Cincinnati, Ohio, U.S.
- Burial place: Polmont Old Churchyard, Scotland
- Military career
- Allegiance: United Kingdom
- Branch: British Army; Royal Air Force
- Service years: 1914–1918
- Rank: Captain
- Units: No. 11 Squadron RFC; No. 25 Squadron RFC; No. 23 Squadron RAF
- Conflicts: World War I
- Awards: Military Cross & Bar

Captain James Fitz-Morris MC* (6 April 1897 – 14 August 1918) was a British World War I flying ace credited with 14 aerial victories. Records give his name in various spellings; Fitz-Morris, J. F. Morris, Fitzmorris or Fitzmaurice.

== Early life and service ==
Born and raised in Polmont, Scotland, Fitz-Morris was educated at Laurieston School. He passed the Civil Service entrance examination, but gained a deferment on joining the army in late 1914, on the understanding that a position would be reserved for him. He served in the Highland Light Infantry as a motor despatch rider, but after only three months he transferred to the Royal Flying Corps and was trained as an observer. He flew in the Vickers Gunbus with No. 11 Squadron in 1915 as an observer, before retraining as a pilot, being appointed a flying officer at the rank of temporary second lieutenant on 12 July 1916.

== World War I service as a pilot ==
Sent to No. 11 Squadron, his operational career was suspended after an injury in a flying accident in August 1916, fracturing his nose and suffering concussion. After recovering he served as an instructor at Harlaxton, near Grantham, Lincolnshire, and was also promoted to captain.

He then joined No. 25 Squadron in France in July 1917, flying the Royal Aircraft Factory FE.2d and then the Airco DH.4 bomber, claiming with his gunner David Luther Burgess, some seven aircraft shot down during July and August. They were both awarded the Military Cross (MC) for their deeds, Fitz-Morris's being gazetted on 26 September 1917.

He then became a flight commander in No. 23 Squadron, flying the SPAD from early 1918 onward, winning a bar to his MC on 22 June 1918 by downing seven enemy aircraft during March 1918. He was slightly wounded in his final engagement, on 24 March 1918, and grounded for a few days. He did not score again after his return to flying.

His final confirmed official tally was one aircraft captured, five set afire, four more otherwise destroyed (including one shared), and four others driven down 'out of control'.

== Death in flying accident ==
Fitz-Morris was sent to the United States to serve as an instructor, in the British Aviation Mission under Brigadier-General Charles Frederick Lee. While taking part in a tour of the mid-Western states designed to stimulate support for the war and the air services Fitz-Morris was killed when his Sopwith Camel crashed shortly after take off from the Western Hills Golf Course in Cincinnati, Ohio. Because of the fears of German U-boats his body was temporarily laid to rest in the family tomb of the Groesbecks, a prominent Cincinnati family. His funeral was attended by 4,000 mourners, with approximately 250,000 more lining the route of the funeral procession. A year later, after the war was over, his remains were repatriated and re-interred at Polmont Old Churchyard.

== Citations for military honours ==
Military Cross
Temporary Captain James Fitz-Morris, General List, and Royal Flying Corps.
For conspicuous gallantry and devotion to duty on photographic and offensive patrols. On at least four occasions he has displayed great dash and courage in attacking hostile machines, two of which he completely destroyed, and has driven others down out of control.

Bar to Military Cross
Lieutenant (Temporary Captain) James Fitz-Morris, MC, Highland Light Infantry, and Royal Flying Corps.
For conspicuous gallantry and devotion to duty. During operations he carried out many reconnaissances at a low altitude and obtained valuable information. On one occasion, while on a bombing patrol, he saw an enemy machine attacking our troops with machine gun fire from about 500 feet, and at once attacked it and drove it to the ground. He then attacked seven enemy scouts, one of which he drove down in flames inside our lines. He has also destroyed five other enemy machines and driven down two others out of control. He has always set a magnificent example of dash and determination.
