= David Luther Burgess =

Canadian politician

- Born: January 28, 1891; Ontario
- Died: November 30, 1960
- Occupation: Politician

David Luther Burgess MC MBE (January 28, 1891 – November 30, 1960) was a World War I flying ace who, in 1926, was the sole challenger to Liberal Prime Minister William Lyon Mackenzie King in a by-election held in Prince Albert, Saskatchewan. The campaign was unsuccessful.

== Biography ==
Born in Kleinburg, Ontario on 28 January 1898, Burgess moved to Saskatchewan in 1910, worked for a lumber company.

=== World War I ===
He enlisted in the Saskatchewan Regiment during World War I and held the rank of lieutenant. In 1917, he was seconded to the Royal Flying Corps as an observer/gunner with No. 25 Squadron flying the DH-4 bomber from May to October 1917. In conjunction with his pilot Captain James Fitz-Morris, the duo scored seven victories (4 destroyed, 3 'out of control'). and was awarded the Military Cross for "conspicuous gallantry and devotion to duty in aerial fighting and on photography".

Mackenzie King had suffered a personal defeat in the 1925 federal election losing his riding of York North in Ontario and needed to win in a by-election in order to re-enter the House of Commons of Canada. Prince Albert Liberal MP Charles McDonald was persuaded to step aside in order to create a vacancy for King.

=== By-election ===
The Prince Albert by-election would normally have been a formality and the Conservative Party declined to enter a candidate as did the Progressives. However, an acclamation was avoided when Burgess entered the contest with the encouragement of the previous Tory candidate John Diefenbaker.

Burgess ran as an independent candidate and argued that Mackenzie King was appropriating the riding of Prince Albert and assuming the compliance of its residents. In an election address, he said:

You, my constituents, are to decide whether the Prince Albert seat in the House of Commons is a chattel to be passed from hand to hand at the whim of a chosen few, or whether the electors themselves are to have a voice as to who shall represent them at Ottawa. You are to decide whether the ballot is to be loaded so that the Liberal candidate is presented on the ballot with all his rank and title while the Independent candidate is robbed of the Military Cross which he won in France.

Burgess was defeated in the February 15, 1926, by-election by a three-to-one margin.

=== Later career ===
Four years later, after the 1930 federal election defeated Mackenzie King's government and brought the Conservatives to power, Burgess moved to Ottawa to take up a position as private secretary to the new Minister of Agriculture, Robert Weir. He remained in Ottawa as a civil servant with the Department of Agriculture after the Conservatives were defeated in 1935 and retired from the position of chief of supplies of the department in 1957.

In 1956, he was elected Dominion president of the Canadian Legion and served in that position for four years.

=== Death ===
He was a candidate for the city of Ottawa's Board of Control when he suffered a heart attack and died five days before the election.

Canadian federal by-election, February 15, 1926: Prince Albert Charles McDonald's resignation on January 15, 1926.
Party	Candidate	Votes	%	±%	Elected
Liberal	William Lyon Mackenzie King	7,920	77.50	+26.3	✓
Independent	David Luther Burgess	2,299	22.50		
Total valid votes		10,219	100.0		
History of Federal Ridings Since 1867
