= Prince Albert (provincial electoral district) =

Former provincial electoral district in Saskatchewan, Canada

Coordinates: 53°11′46″N 105°45′16″W

Prince Albert was a provincial electoral district for the Legislative Assembly of the province of Saskatchewan, Canada. This constituency was one of 25 created for the 1st Saskatchewan general election in 1905 under the name Prince Albert City, distinguished from the more rural district of Prince Albert County.

Renamed Prince Albert in 1917, the district was dissolved before the 1967 Saskatchewan election and divided into Prince Albert West (later "Prince Albert-Duck Lake") and Prince Albert East-Cumberland. It is now part of the constituencies of Prince Albert Northcote and Prince Albert Carlton.

It was later reconstituted in 1975, and represented in the legislature until 1991, when the district became part of Prince Albert Carlton.

== Members of the Legislative Assembly ==
#	MLA	Served	Party
1.	John Henderson Lamont	1905–1907	Liberal
2.	William F. Alphonse Turgeon	October 12, 1907 – 1908	Liberal
3.	John Ernest Bradshaw	1908–1917	Provincial Rights, Conservative
4.	Charles M. McDonald	1917–1925	Liberal
5.	Thomas Clayton Davis	1925–1939	Liberal
6.	Harry Fraser	October 16, 1939 – 1944	Liberal
7.	Larry McIntosh	1944–1962	CCF
8.	Davey Steuart	November 14, 1962 – 1967	Liberal
9.	Mike Feschuk	1975 – 1982	NDP
10.	John Paul Meagher	1982 — 1986	PC
11.	Myron Kowalsky	1986 – 1991	NDP

== Election results ==
1905 Saskatchewan general election: Prince Albert City
Party	Candidate	Votes	%	±%
Liberal	John Henderson Lamont	290	46.93%	–
Provincial Rights	William Cowan	234	37.86%	–
Independent	William Thomas Gillmor	94	15.21%	–
Total		618	100.00%	

October 12, 1907 By-Election: Prince Albert City
Party	Candidate	Votes	%	±%
Liberal	William F. Alphonse Turgeon	431	54.08%	+7.15
Provincial Rights	John Ernest Bradshaw	366	45.92%	+8.06
Total		797	100.00%	

1908 Saskatchewan general election: Prince Albert City
Party	Candidate	Votes	%	±%
Provincial Rights	John Ernest Bradshaw	614	58.81%	+12.89
Liberal	William F. Alphonse Turgeon	430	41.19%	-12.89
Total		1,044	100.00%	

1912 Saskatchewan general election: Prince Albert City
Party	Candidate	Votes	%	±%
Conservative	John Ernest Bradshaw	947	60.20%	+1.39
Liberal	Thomas Robertson	626	39.80%	-1.39
Total		1,573	100.00%	

1917 Saskatchewan general election: Prince Albert electoral district
Party	Candidate	Votes	%	±%
Liberal	Charles M. McDonald	2,106	63.57%	+23.77
Conservative	John Ernest Bradshaw	1,089	32.87%	-27.33
Independent	John McLeod	118	3.56%	-
Total		3,313	100.00%	

1921 Saskatchewan general election: Prince Albert electoral district
Party	Candidate	Votes	%	±%
Liberal	Charles M. McDonald	Acclaimed	100.00%	
Total		Acclamation		

1925 Saskatchewan general election: Prince Albert electoral district
Party	Candidate	Votes	%	±%
Liberal	Thomas Clayton Davis	3,164	63.50%	-
Progressive	Thomas E. Fear	1,819	36.50%	–
Total		4,983	100.00%	

March 18, 1926 By-Election: Prince Albert electoral district
Party	Candidate	Votes	%	±%
Liberal	Thomas Clayton Davis	Acclaimed	100.00%	
Total		Acclamation		

1929 Saskatchewan general election: Prince Albert electoral district
Party	Candidate	Votes	%	±%
Liberal	Thomas Clayton Davis	3,578	53.08%	-
Conservative	John George Diefenbaker	3,163	46.92%	-
Total		6,741	100.00%	

1934 Saskatchewan general election: Prince Albert electoral district
Party	Candidate	Votes	%	±%
Liberal	Thomas Clayton Davis	5,474	62.95%	+9.87
Conservative	Samuel J. A. Branion	2,007	23.08%	-23.84
Farmer-Labour	Edward Percy Spratt	1,215	13.97%	–
Total		8,696	100.00%	

1938 Saskatchewan general election: Prince Albert electoral district
Party	Candidate	Votes	%	±%
Liberal	Thomas Clayton Davis	5,279	48.80%	-14.15
Social Credit	George Bzowey	2,342	21.65%	–
Conservative	Kennedy H. Palmer	2,227	20.58%	-2.50
CCF	John J.F. McIsaac	970	8.97%	-5.00
Total		10,818	100.00%	

October 16, 1939 By-Election: Prince Albert electoral district
Party	Candidate	Votes	%	±%
Liberal	Harry Fraser	Acclaimed	100.00%	
Total		Acclamation		

1944 Saskatchewan general election: Prince Albert electoral district
Party	Candidate	Votes	%	±%
CCF	Larry McIntosh	6,178	59.12%	-
Liberal	Harry Fraser	3,617	34.61%	-
Prog. Conservative	Edgar P. Woodman	655	6.27%	-
Total		10,450	100.00%	

1948 Saskatchewan general election: Prince Albert electoral district
Party	Candidate	Votes	%	±%
CCF	Larry McIntosh	6,944	51.15%	-7.97
Liberal	Charles McIntosh	6,052	44.58%	+9.97
Social Credit	Ralph Ernst	579	4.27%	-
Total		13,575	100.00%	

1952 Saskatchewan general election: Prince Albert electoral district
Party	Candidate	Votes	%	±%
CCF	Larry McIntosh	6,107	54.50%	+3.35
Liberal	R.J. McArter	4,416	39.41%	-5.17
Prog. Conservative	N.J. Bichan	683	6.09%	-
Total		11,206	100.00%	

1956 Saskatchewan general election: Prince Albert electoral district
Party	Candidate	Votes	%	±%
CCF	Larry McIntosh	5,465	46.38%	-8.12
Liberal	J.H.C. Harradence	3,390	28.77%	-10.64
Social Credit	E.T. Martin	2,928	24.85%	-
Total		11,783	100.00%	

1960 Saskatchewan general election: Prince Albert electoral district
Party	Candidate	Votes	%	±%
CCF	Larry McIntosh	5,098	39.31%	-7.07
Liberal	Davey Steuart	4,621	35.63%	+6.86
Prog. Conservative	Dale Yoos	2,353	18.15%	-
Social Credit	George Mirka	896	6.91%	-17.94
Total		12,968	100.00%	

November 14, 1962 By-Election: Prince Albert electoral district
Party	Candidate	Votes	%	±%
Liberal	Davey Steuart	7,450	60.19%	+24.56
CCF	Joseph E. L. Lamontagne	4,928	39.81%	+0.50
Total		12,378	100.00%	

1964 Saskatchewan general election: Prince Albert electoral district
Party	Candidate	Votes	%	±%
Liberal	Davey Steuart	5,024	36.41%	-23.78
CCF	Joseph E. L. Lamontagne	4,946	35.85%	-3.96
Prog. Conservative	Richard E. Spencer	3,828	27.74%	-
Total		13,798	100.00%	

== See also ==
- List of Saskatchewan provincial electoral districts
- List of Saskatchewan general elections
- Canadian provincial electoral districts
- Prince Albert — North-West Territories electoral district (1870–1905)
