= John Paul Meagher =

Canadian politician (1939–2019)

John Paul Meagher (April 4, 1939 – May 28, 2019) was a developer and political figure in Saskatchewan, Canada. He represented Prince Albert from 1982 to 1986 in the Legislative Assembly of Saskatchewan as a Progressive Conservative.

He was born in Prince Albert, Saskatchewan, the son of John Paul Meagher. In 1964, Meagher married Barbara Florence Valantine. Before entering politics, he was a plumbing and heating contractor.

Meagher was criticized for his involvement in a resort complex at Redberry Lake while serving as legislative secretary to the Minister for Parks and Renewable Resources, but was later cleared of violating rules for conflict of interest. He was defeated by Myron Kowalsky when he ran for reelection to the provincial assembly in 1986. He ran for the federal Reform Party in 1993 in the Prince Albert-Churchill River riding, finishing third.

He died from cancer on May 28, 2019, aged 80.
