= Francis Helme =

Canadian politician

Member of Parliament for Prince Albert
- In office June 1949 – June 1953
- Preceded by: Edward LeRoy Bowerman
- Succeeded by: John Diefenbaker

Personal details
- Born: Francis Heselton Helme; 26 August 1899 Liverpool, England
- Died: 11 May 1984 (aged 84) Vancouver, British Columbia
- Party: Liberal
- Spouse(s): Faye Bessie Bicknell m. 15 August 1927
- Profession: Politician, agent, dealer

Francis Heselton Helme (26 August 1899 – 11 May 1984) was a Liberal party member of the House of Commons of Canada. He was born in Liverpool, England, and went to Canada in 1908. He became an agent and dealer for International Harvester.

He was first elected to Parliament at the Prince Albert riding in the 1949 general election. He defeated the CCF Member for Prince Albert, Edward LeRoy Bowerman, who had in 1945 defeated then Prime Minister William Lyon Mackenzie King. After serving in the 21st Canadian Parliament, Helme did not seek another federal term in the 1953 election. He died of heart disease in Vancouver, British Columbia in 1984.

== Electoral record ==
1949 Canadian federal election: Prince Albert
Party	Candidate	Votes	%	±%
Liberal	Francis Heselton Helme	8,916	48.2	+7.8
Co-operative Commonwealth	Edward LeRoy Bowerman	7,341	39.6	-1.3
Progressive Conservative	George Henry Whitter	2,258	12.2	-2.1
Total valid votes		18,515	100.0	
