= Louis William Larsen =

Canadian politician

Louis William Larsen (January 16, 1892 – October 18, 1955) was a Danish-born farmer and political figure in Saskatchewan, Canada. He represented Shellbrook from 1948 to 1955 in the Legislative Assembly of Saskatchewan as a Co-operative Commonwealth Federation (CCF) member.

He was born Lauritz William Larsen, the son of C.P. Larsen and Marie Anne Peterson, was educated in Denmark and came to Canada in 1909. In 1920, Larsen married Florence Martha Gillies. He was an agent for the Saskatchewan Wheat Pool in Blaine Lake, Saskatchewan and then Leask. Larsen died in office of prostate cancer at the age of 63.

Larsen Island in the Wollaston Lake area was named in his honour.
