= Peter Tyerman =

Canadian politician (1867–1958)

Member of the Legislative Assembly of Saskatchewan for Prince Albert
- In office December 13, 1905 – February 20, 1906
- Preceded by: first member
- Succeeded by: Samuel James Donaldson

Personal details
- Born: October 1, 1867 Bowmanville, Ontario
- Died: May 16, 1958 (aged 90) Prince Albert, Saskatchewan
- Party: Liberal
- Occupation: physician

Peter David Tyerman (October 1, 1867 - May 16, 1958) was a Canadian physician and politician. He represented Prince Albert in the Legislative Assembly of Saskatchewan from 1905 to 1906, although virtually the entirety of his brief term in office was tied up in legal wrangling over irregularities that had left the result in dispute. Tyerman himself, however, was never implicated in any wrongdoing, which related entirely to allegations of improper conduct by provincial election officials.

== Background ==
Born in Bowmanville, Ontario, he studied medicine at the University of Toronto before moving to Prince Albert in 1898.

During World War I, he served as a medical officer in the Canadian Armed Forces. After retiring as a doctor, he took up farming and served on Prince Albert's public school board.

== Political career ==
His election to the legislature in the 1905 Saskatchewan general election was not confirmed until a week after election day. He was reported as the initial winner, although conflicting results left it unclear for a number of days as both Tyerman and challenger Samuel James Donaldson were reported to have narrow leads of less than ten votes at different times, until three ballot boxes arrived from the remote far northern communities of Pine Point, Bear Lake and Sandy Lake, finally giving Tyerman a secure lead.

The final result, 411 votes for Tyerman to 316 for Donaldson, was declared on January 9, 1906. By January 22, however, the deputy returning officers from the northern communities had been charged and fined with election irregularities, with the court finding that they had not conducted the election on the correct date, overturning Tyerman's entire majority.

Tyerman offered his resignation from the legislature within days, although this was deferred by the government pending the results of a judicial recount. Although the officers asserted that the delay was caused solely by the difficulty of travel to the remote communities, Donaldson's Provincial Rights Party alleged that the returning officers had not actually set up any proper voting procedures at all, but in fact had merely stuffed the ballot boxes with votes for Tyerman themselves.

The recount in February upheld the original result, with the judge declining to exclude the disputed ballots from the count on the grounds that he did not have legal jurisdiction to assess their validity. As soon as the recount concluded, Tyerman nonetheless resubmitted his deferred resignation, stating that he was "disgusted" with both the behaviour of the returning officers and the bureaucratic complications that had held up the process, and never actually sat in a session of the legislature.

As a result of his resignation, however, the government then came under fire around the question of whether it was proper for Tyerman to have resigned, thus forcing a full by-election, as opposed to the legislature simply awarding the seat directly to Donaldson. On April 2, 1907, over a year after Tyerman's resignation, the seat was awarded to Donaldson by the legislature's standing committee on elections.
