= Guy Franklin Van Eaton =

Canadian politician

Guy Franklin Van Eaton (August 20, 1878 – January 9, 1950) was an American-born farmer and politician in Saskatchewan, Canada. He represented Shellbrook from 1945 to 1948 in the Legislative Assembly of Saskatchewan as a Co-operative Commonwealth Federation (CCF) member.

He was born in Iowa, grew up in South Dakota and continued his education in Tacoma, Washington. He married Anna Flavel Van Eaton in 1910 and came to Canada in 1916, settling near Vanscoy, Saskatchewan. Van Eaton became a member of the Saskatchewan Wheat Pool. In 1927, he moved to a farm near Shellbrook. He ran unsuccessfully for a seat in the provincial assembly in 1929; in 1938, Van Eaton was campaign manager for Albert Mansfield, a CCF candidate running for the provincial Shellbrook seat. He was elected to the provincial assembly in a 1945 by-election held following the death of Albert Victor Sterling.
