= Lachlan Fraser McIntosh =

American-Canadian politician

Lachlan Fraser "Lachie" McIntosh (July 30, 1897 – March 17, 1962) was an American-born Canadian farmer and political figure in Saskatchewan. He represented Prince Albert from 1944 to 1962 in the Legislative Assembly of Saskatchewan as a Co-operative Commonwealth Federation (CCF) member.

He was born in Bottineau, North Dakota, and came to the Qu'Appelle district of Saskatchewan with his family in 1906. He was educated there and began farming, later moving to Prince Albert. McIntosh helped organize the Saskatchewan Wheat Pool in 1923 and was the first delegate from his region in the following year. In 1940, he married Jessie Ann Jones. McIntosh served on the council for the rural municipality of South Qu'Appelle.

He was a member of the provincial cabinet, serving as minister of public works, as minister of co-operation and co-operative development, as minister of agriculture and as minister of municipal affairs. McIntosh died in office at the age of 64.
