= Prince Albert—Churchill River =

Former federal electoral district in Saskatchewan, Canada

Prince Albert—Churchill River was a federal electoral district in the province of Saskatchewan, Canada, that was represented in the House of Commons of Canada from 1988 to 1997. This riding was created in 1987 from parts of Mackenzie, Prince Albert, and The Battlefords—Meadow Lake ridings. Prince Albert—Churchill River consisted of the northern portion of the province of Saskatchewan.

The electoral district was abolished in 1996 when it was redistributed into Churchill River, Prince Albert and Wanuskewin ridings.

== Electoral history ==
1988 Canadian federal election
Party	Candidate	Votes
New Democratic	Ray Funk	17,915
Progressive Conservative	J.J. Cennon	8,234
Liberal	Peter G. Kingsmill	5,007
Reform	Ken Suitor	490
Confederation of Regions	Mary R. Richardt	105

1993 Canadian federal election
Party	Candidate	Votes
Liberal	Gordon Kirkby	11,589
New Democratic	Ray Funk	9,031
Reform	J. Paul Meagher	5,694
Independent	Rick V. Laliberte	1,499
Progressive Conservative	Joyce Middlebrook	1,412
National	Brian Baker	442
Canada Party	Donald Kavanagh	125
Independent	Richard Arthur Potratz	79

== See also ==
- List of Canadian electoral districts
- Historical federal electoral districts of Canada
