= Randy Hoback =

Canadian politician

Randy C. Hoback MP
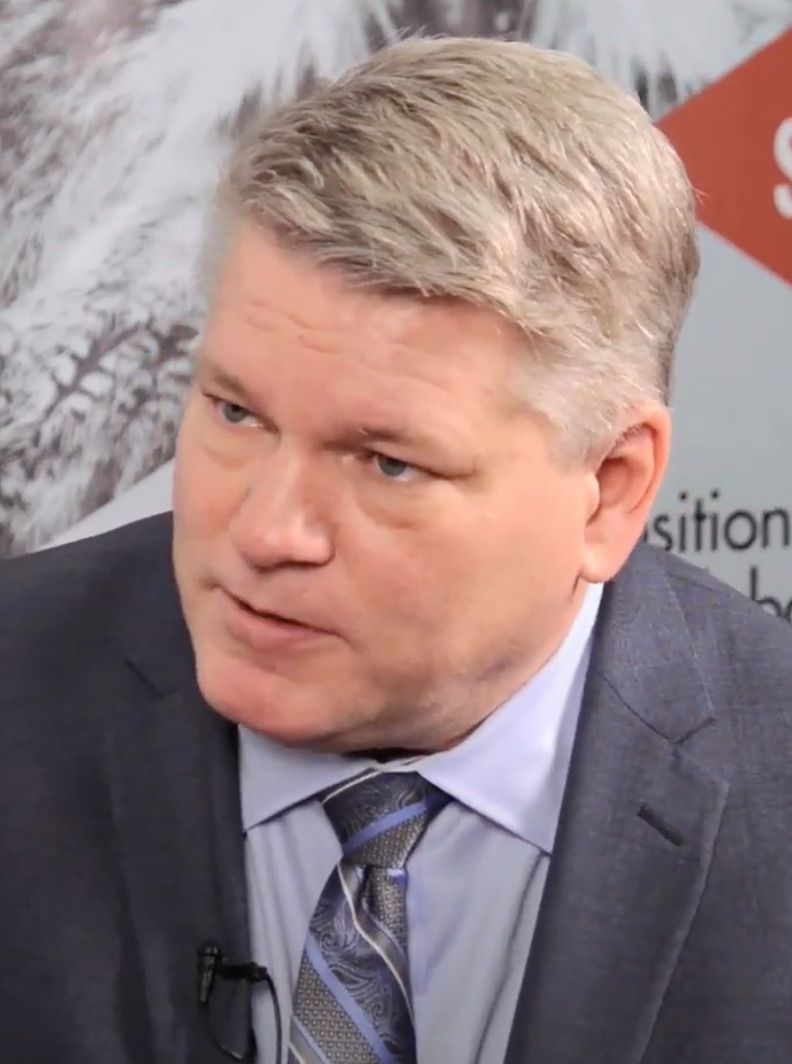

Member of Parliament for Prince Albert
- Incumbent
- Assumed office October 14, 2008
- Preceded by: Brian Fitzpatrick

Personal details
- Born: December 19, 1967 (age 58) Prince Albert, Saskatchewan, Canada
- Party: Conservative
- Education: University of Saskatchewan McMaster University

Randy C. Hoback MP (born December 19, 1967) is a Canadian politician who was elected to represent the electoral district of Prince Albert in the 2008 Canadian federal election. He is a member of the Conservative Party. He was subsequently re-elected in the 2011, 2015, 2019, 2021 and 2025 federal elections.

== Life and career ==
Hoback has a business administration certificate from the University of Saskatchewan and Chartered Director's designation from McMaster University and the Conference Board of Canada.

Hoback worked for farm machinery manufacturer Flexicoil and later Case New Holland from 1986 to 2000, when he purchased the family farm in 2000.

Hoback served as chairman of the Western Canadian Wheat Growers Association (WCWGA), and represented them at World Trade Organization meetings in Geneva and Hong Kong.

As an MP, Hoback was a member of the Standing Committee on Procedure and House Affairs, a member of the Standing Committee on Agriculture and Agri-food, and the Standing Committee on Finance. On October 16, 2014, he became chair of the Standing Committee on International Trade, a post he held until the 2015 federal election. He also served as the chair of the Saskatchewan Conservative Caucus and as the Vice Chair of the Standing Committee on International Trade.

In 2010, he was elected as chair of the Canadian Section of ParlAmericas, an organization committed to promoting parliamentary participation in the inter-American system, developing inter-parliamentary dialogue on issues of importance to the hemisphere, and encouraging the sharing of experiences and best practices amongst its members. It also works to strengthen the role of legislatures in democratic development, and promotes the harmonization of legislation and hemispheric integration as instruments of sustainable and harmonious development. In February 2011, Hoback was elected President of ParlAmericas at the Association's 8th Annual FIPA-Parlamericas meeting in Asuncion, Paraguay. He now serves as the organization's Past-President.

During the 43rd Canadian Parliament, he introduced one private member bill, Bill C-234, An Act to amend the Income Tax Act (home security measures) which sought to create federal tax credit for making an expense to acquire, install, or maintain a security system installed in a dwelling or accessory building. It was brought to a vote on June 9, 2021, but defeated with only Conservative Party members voting in favour. In the 2020 Conservative Party of Canada leadership election he endorsed Peter MacKay.

== Personal life ==
Born in Prince Albert, Saskatchewan, Hoback is married with two children. At the time of the 2025 Canadian federal election, he lived in the Rural Municipality of Canwood No. 494.

== Electoral record ==
2025 Canadian federal election: Prince Albert
** Preliminary results — Not yet official **
| Party | Candidate | Votes | % | ±% | Expenditures |
|---|---|---|---|---|---|
| Conservative | Randy Hoback | 27,763 | 71.5% | | |
| Liberal | Christopher Hadubiak | 7,451 | 19.2% | | |
| New Democratic | Virginia Kutzan | 3,630 | 9.3% | | |
| Total valid votes/expense limit | | 38,844 | | | |
| Total rejected ballots | | 348 | | | |
| Turnout | | 39,192 | 61.69 | | |
| Eligible voters | | 63,528 | | | |
Source: Elections Canada

2021 Canadian federal election: Prince Albert
| Party | Candidate | Votes | % | ±% | Expenditures |
|---|---|---|---|---|---|
| Conservative | Randy Hoback | 22,340 | 64.9 | -2.8 | $43,253.20 |
| New Democratic | Ken MacDougall | 5,214 | 15.1 | -2.3 | $5,527.17 |
| Liberal | Estelle Hjertaas | 3,653 | 10.6 | +0.3 | $19,152.96 |
| People's | Joseph McCrea | 2,388 | 6.9 | +4.9 | $3,603.87 |
| Maverick | Heather Schmitt | 466 | 1.4 | - | $7,787.78 |
| Green | Hamish Graham | 364 | 1.1 | -1.0 | $0.00 |
| Total valid votes/expense limit | | 34,425 | 100.0 | – | $110,268.45 |
| Total rejected ballots | | 161 | 0.5 | | |
| Turnout | | 34,586 | 60.2 | | |
| Eligible voters | | 57,483 | | | |
Source: Elections Canada

2019 Canadian federal election: Prince Albert
| Party | Candidate | Votes | % | ±% | Expenditures |
|---|---|---|---|---|---|
| Conservative | Randy Hoback | 26,891 | 67.7 | +17.91 | $47,630.00 |
| New Democratic | Harmony Johnson-Harder | 6,925 | 17.4 | -11.06 | none listed |
| Liberal | Estelle Hjertaas | 4,107 | 10.3 | -9.52 | $32,348.20 |
| Green | Kerri Wall | 839 | 2.1 | +0.17 | $0.00 |
| People's | Kelly Day | 778 | 2.0 | - | $2,327.52 |
| Veterans Coalition | Brian Littlepine | 170 | 0.4 | - | none listed |
| Total valid votes/expense limit | | 39,710 | 100.0 | | |
| Total rejected ballots | | 237 | | | |
| Turnout | | 39,947 | 69.8 | | |
| Eligible voters | | 57,200 | | | |
| Conservative hold | | Swing | | +14.49 | |
Source: Elections Canada

2015 Canadian federal election: Prince Albert
| Party | Candidate | Votes | % | ±% | Expenditures |
|---|---|---|---|---|---|
| Conservative | Randy Hoback | 19,673 | 49.79 | -12.63 | $150,007.16 |
| New Democratic | Lon Borgerson | 11,244 | 28.46 | -3.03 | $73,259.98 |
| Liberal | Gordon Kirkby | 7,832 | 19.82 | +16.38 | $10,644.06 |
| Green | Byron Tenkink | 761 | 1.93 | -0.29 | $422.40 |
| Total valid votes/expense limit | | 39,510 | 100.0 | | $210,065.49 |
| Total rejected ballots | | 103 | – | – | |
| Turnout | | 39,613 | – | – | |
| Eligible voters | | 55,873 | | | |
Source: Elections Canada

2011 Canadian federal election
| Party | Candidate | Votes | % | ±% | Expenditures |
|---|---|---|---|---|---|
| Conservative | Randy Hoback | 19,214 | 62.2 | +4.5 | $79,394 |
| New Democratic | Valerie Mushinski | 9,841 | 31.8 | +3.0 | $47,100 |
| Liberal | Ron Wassill | 1,070 | 3.5 | -4.5 | $1,991 |
| Green | Myk Brazier | 666 | 2.2 | -2.7 | – |
| Canadian Action | Craig Batley | 116 | 0.4 | -0.2 | – |
| Total valid votes/Expense limit | | 30,907 | 100.0 | | $83,468 |
| Total rejected ballots | | 88 | 0.30 | +0.1 | |
| Turnout | | 30,995 | 60.80 | +5 | |
| Eligible voters | | 50,946 | – | – | |

2008 Canadian federal election
| Party | Candidate | Votes | % | ±% | Expenditures |
|---|---|---|---|---|---|
| Conservative | Randy Hoback | 16,542 | 57.7 | +3.3 | $72,129 |
| New Democratic | Valerie Mushinski | 8,243 | 28.8 | +5.0 | $47,075 |
| Liberal | Lou Doderai | 2,289 | 8.0 | -11.4 | $10,138 |
| Green | Amanda Judith Marie Smytaniuk | 1,413 | 4.9 | +2.6 | $2,466 |
| Canadian Action | Craig Batley | 167 | 0.6 | – | $ |
| Total valid votes/Expense limit | | 28,654 | 100.0 | | $80,865 |
| Total rejected ballots | | 55.00 | 0.2 | -0.1 | |
| Turnout | | 28,709 | 56.00 | -6 | |
