= Brian Fitzpatrick (Canadian politician) =

Canadian politician (born 1945)

Brian Fitzpatrick MP

Member of Parliament for Prince Albert
- In office November 27, 2000 – October 14, 2008
- Preceded by: Derrek Konrad
- Succeeded by: Randy Hoback

Personal details
- Born: November 18, 1945 (age 80) Assiniboia, Saskatchewan
- Party: Conservative
- Other political affiliations: Canadian Alliance (2000–2003)
- Spouse: Zinaida Fitzpatrick
- Profession: Lawyer

Brian Fitzpatrick (born November 18, 1945, in Assiniboia, Saskatchewan) is a Canadian politician.

After serving as a board of education trustee in Nipawin, Saskatchewan, Fitzpatrick ran in the 2000 Canadian federal election for the Canadian Alliance. He was elected to the House of Commons of Canada, and, after the Canadian Alliance merged into the Conservative Party of Canada, he ran again and won. In both elections, he ran in the riding of Prince Albert. Fitzpatrick also ran in the 1993 Canadian federal election for the Reform Party of Canada in the riding of Mackenzie but he lost. He is a lawyer and the former opposition critic of Litigation, Rural Development, Regional Development and New and Emerging Markets. He was one of the founding members of the Saskatchewan Party and was its first director of policy development and chaired the founding convention for the party. In 2006, Brian Fitzpatrick sponsored the Act to Amend Income Tax, and on June 22, 2007, the bill was passed.
