= Thomas Osborne Davis (Canadian politician) =

Canadian politician (1856–1917)

The Honourable Thomas Davis
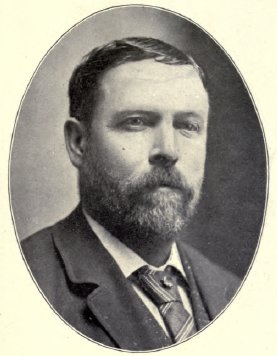
- Davis in 1901/1902

Canadian Senator from Saskatchewan
- In office 1 September 1905 – 23 January 1917

Canadian Senator from Northwest Territories
- In office 30 September 1904 – 31 August 1905
- Preceded by: Position established
- Succeeded by: Willie Adams

Member of Parliament for Saskatchewan
- In office 18 December 1896 – 29 September 1904
- Preceded by: Wilfrid Laurier
- Succeeded by: John Henderson Lamont

Personal details
- Born: Thomas Osborne Davis; 16 August 1856 Sherrington, Canada East, Province of Canada
- Died: 23 January 1917 (aged 60) Prince Albert, Saskatchewan, Canada
- Party: Liberal
- Occupation: Politician; merchant
- Committees: Select Committee on Resources of the Territory between Labrador and the Rocky Mountains

Thomas Osborne Davis (16 August 1856 – 23 January 1917) was a Canadian Member of Parliament in the House of Commons of Canada representing the Provisional District of Saskatchewan, and later a member of the Senate of Canada.

== Background ==
He was tutored by his father Samuel Davis and became a general merchant at Prince Albert, Northwest Territories. In 1885, he married Rebecca Jennings. He served on the town council for Prince Albert and was mayor from 1894 to 1895.

Davis died in office in Prince Albert at the age of 60. His son Thomas Clayton Davis also served as mayor of Prince Albert, going on to serve in the Saskatchewan assembly, as a Saskatchewan judge and as an ambassador for Canada. Davis' daughter Alice was married to hockey executive and banker H. J. Sterling.
