= Shellbrook (electoral district) =

Former provincial electoral district in Saskatchewan, Canada

Coordinates: 53°22′N 105°57′W

Shellbrook was a provincial electoral district for the Legislative Assembly of the province of Saskatchewan, Canada, in the area of Shellbrook, west of Prince Albert.

Created as "Prince Albert" before the 1st Saskatchewan general election in 1905, this constituency was redrawn and renamed "Shellbrook" in 1912. The riding was again redrawn and renamed "Shellbrook-Torch River" in 1982, and abolished before the 23rd Saskatchewan general election in 1995 into Shellbrook-Spiritwood and Saskatchewan Rivers. Shellbrook-Spiritwood existed from 1995 to 2003. The former Shellbrook riding is now part of the districts of Rosthern-Shellbrook and Saskatchewan Rivers.

== Members of the Legislative Assembly ==
=== Prince Albert & Prince Albert County (1905–1912) ===
#	MLA	Served	Party
1.	Peter Tyerman ^{*}	1905 – February 20, 1906	Liberal
2.	Samuel James Donaldson	April 2, 1907 – 1912	Provincial Rights

=== Shellbrook (1912–1982) ===
#	MLA	Served	Party
1.	Samuel James Donaldson	1912 – 1915	Conservative
2.	Edgar Sidney Clinch	May 1915 – 1934	Liberal
3.	Omer A. Demers	1934 – 1944	Liberal
4.	Albert V. Sterling	1944 – 1945	CCF
5.	G. Franklin Van Eaton	Sept. 1945 – 1948	CCF
6.	Louis Larsen	1948 – 1956	CCF
7.	John Thiessen	1956 – 1964	CCF
8.	John M. Cuelenaere	1964 – 1967	Liberal
9.	George Bowerman	1967 – 1982	New Democrat

=== Shellbrook-Torch River (1982–1995) ===
#	MLA	Served	Party
1.	Lloyd Muller	1982 – 1991	Progressive Conservative
2.	Jack Langford	1991 – 1995	New Democrat

== Election results ==
=== Prince Albert & Prince Albert County (1905–1912) ===
1905 Saskatchewan general election: Prince Albert electoral district
Party	Candidate	Votes	%	±%
Liberal	Peter Tyerman^{*}	411	56.53%	–
Provincial Rights	Samuel James Donaldson	316	43.47%	–
Total		727	100.00%	

Note: ^{*}In 1907, by order of the Legislative Assembly, 151 votes for Peter Tyerman were "set aside" and Samuel Donaldson of the Provincial Rights party was declared elected.

1908 Saskatchewan general election: Prince Albert County
Party	Candidate	Votes	%	±%
Provincial Rights	Samuel James Donaldson	447	62.17%	+18.70
Liberal	Andrew Knox	272	37.83%	-18.70
Total		719	100.00%	

=== Shellbrook (1912–1982) ===
1912 Saskatchewan general election: Shellbrook electoral district
Party	Candidate	Votes	%	±%
Conservative	Samuel James Donaldson	478	58.22%	-3.95
Liberal	Alexander McOwan	343	41.78%	+3.95
Total		821	100.00%	

May 10, 1915 By-Election: Shellbrook electoral district
Party	Candidate	Votes	%	±%
Liberal	Edgar Sidney Clinch	1,667	71.88%	+30.10
Conservative	Alexander Frederick Agnew	581	25.06%	-33.16
Independent Liberal	Thomas Alexander Borthwick	71	3.06%	–
Total		2,319	100.00%	

1917 Saskatchewan general election: Shellbrook electoral district
Party	Candidate	Votes	%	±%
Liberal	Edgar Sidney Clinch	2,335	68.32%	-3.56
Conservative	Ralph Byron Horner	1,083	31.68%	+6.62
Total		3,418	100.00%	

1921 Saskatchewan general election: Shellbrook electoral district
Party	Candidate	Votes	%	±%
Liberal	Edgar Sidney Clinch	1,900	59.94%	-8.38
Independent	Alexander McOwan	1,270	40.06%	–
Total		3,170	100.00%	

1925 Saskatchewan general election: Shellbrook electoral district
Party	Candidate	Votes	%	±%
Liberal	Edgar Sidney Clinch	2,421	54.92%	-5.02
Progressive	William Mattock	1,987	45.08%	–
Total		4,408	100.00%	

1929 Saskatchewan general election: Shellbrook electoral district
Party	Candidate	Votes	%	±%
Liberal	Edgar Sidney Clinch	3,058	55.93%	+1.01
Conservative	Ralph Byron Horner	1,460	26.70%	-
Independent	G. Franklin Van Eaton	950	17.37%	-
Total		5,468	100.00%	

1934 Saskatchewan general election: Shellbrook electoral district
Party	Candidate	Votes	%	±%
Liberal	Omer A. Demers	5,238	53.56%	-2.37
Farmer–Labour	Peter G. Makaroff	2,332	23.85%	–
Conservative	Alexander Frederick Agnew	2,209	22.59%	-4.11
Total		9,779	100.00%	

1938 Saskatchewan general election: Shellbrook electoral district
Party	Candidate	Votes	%	±%
Liberal	Omer A. Demers	2,933	42.90%	-10.66
Social Credit	Virden Gable	2,560	37.45%	–
Co-operative Commonwealth	Albert Mansfield	1,343	19.65%	-4.20
Total		6,836	100.00%	

1944 Saskatchewan general election: Shellbrook electoral district
Party	Candidate	Votes	%	±%
Co-operative Commonwealth	Albert V. Sterling	3,310	60.32%	+40.67
Liberal	Omer A. Demers	2,177	39.68%	-3.22
Total		5,487	100.00%	

June 29, 1945 By-Election: Shellbrook electoral district
Party	Candidate	Votes	%	±%
Co-operative Commonwealth	G. Franklin Van Eaton	3,350	53.06%	-7.26
Liberal	Harold K. Elder	2,514	39.81%	+0.13
Social Credit	Albert M. Courchene	450	7.13%	-
Total		6,314	100.00%	

1948 Saskatchewan general election: Shellbrook electoral district
Party	Candidate	Votes	%	±%
Co-operative Commonwealth	Louis Larsen	2,981	44.19%	-8.87
Liberal	W.R. Vincent	2,806	41.59%	+1.78
Social Credit	George J. Klein	959	14.22%	+7.09
Total		6,746	100.00%	

1952 Saskatchewan general election: Shellbrook electoral district
Party	Candidate	Votes	%	±%
Co-operative Commonwealth	Louis Larsen	3,689	53.19%	+9.00
Liberal	Ernie Uhruh	3,246	46.81%	+5.22
Total		6,935	100.00%	

1956 Saskatchewan general election: Shellbrook electoral district
Party	Candidate	Votes	%	±%
Co-operative Commonwealth	John Thiessen	2,595	39.96%	-13.23
Liberal	George A. Cuelenaere	1,962	30.22%	-16.59
Social Credit	George W. Beilhartz	1,936	29.82%	-
Total		6,493	100.00%	

1960 Saskatchewan general election: Shellbrook electoral district
Party	Candidate	Votes	%	±%
Co-operative Commonwealth	John Thiessen	2,244	35.42%	-4.54
Liberal	George A. Cuelenaere	1,824	28.79%	-1.43
Progressive Conservative	George Klein	1,390	21.94%	-
Social Credit	G. Theodore Froesse	877	13.85%	-15.97
Total		6,335	100.00%	

1964 Saskatchewan general election: Shellbrook electoral district
Party	Candidate	Votes	%	±%
Liberal	John M. Cuelenaere	2,427	38.00%	+9.21
Co-operative Commonwealth	John Thiessen	2,259	35.37%	-0.05
Progressive Conservative	Norval A. Horner	1,701	26.63%	+4.69
Total		6,387	100.00%	

1967 Saskatchewan general election: Shellbrook electoral district
Party	Candidate	Votes	%	±%
New Democratic	George Bowerman	2,515	44.68%	+9.31
Liberal	Pat Moan	2,204	39.15%	+1.15
Progressive Conservative	Norval A. Horner	910	16.17%	-10.46
Total		5,629	100.00%	

1971 Saskatchewan general election: Shellbrook electoral district
Party	Candidate	Votes	%	±%
New Democratic	George Bowerman	3,223	56.88%	+12.20
Liberal	Gordon Rutten	2,443	43.12%	+3.97
Total		5,666	100.00%	

1975 Saskatchewan general election: Shellbrook electoral district
Party	Candidate	Votes	%	±%
New Democratic	George Bowerman	3,138	46.44%	-10.44
Progressive Conservative	John P. Meagher	2,035	30.12%	-
Liberal	Louis W. Hradecki	1,584	23.44%	-19.68
Total		6,757	100.00%	

1978 Saskatchewan general election: Shellbrook electoral district
Party	Candidate	Votes	%	±%
New Democratic	George Bowerman	3,835	52.00%	+5.56
Progressive Conservative	John P. Meagher	3,029	41.07%	+10.95
Liberal	Manley R. McLachlan	511	6.93%	-16.51
Total		7,375	100.00%	

=== Shellbrook-Torch River (1982–1995) ===
1982 Saskatchewan general election: Shellbrook-Torch River
Party	Candidate	Votes	%	±%
Progressive Conservative	Lloyd Muller	4,117	48.96%	+7.89
New Democratic	George Bowerman	3,274	38.93%	-13.07
Western Canada Concept	Stanley Stefanski	667	7.93%	–
Liberal	Jack Greening	287	3.41%	-3.52
Aboriginal People's	Garry Standing	65	0.77%	–
Total		8,410	100.00%	

1986 Saskatchewan general election: Shellbrook-Torch River
Party	Candidate	Votes	%	±%
Progressive Conservative	Lloyd Muller	4,145	48.96%	-
New Democratic	George Bowerman	3,941	46.55%	+7.62
Liberal	Ed Olchowy	380	4.49%	+1.08
Total		8,466	100.00%	

1991 Saskatchewan general election: Shellbrook-Torch River
Party	Candidate	Votes	%	±%
New Democratic	Jack Langford	4,098	53.69%	+7.14
Progressive Conservative	Lloyd Muller	2,358	30.89%	-18.07
Liberal	Walt Billay	1,177	15.42%	+10.93
Total		7,633	100.00%	

== See also ==
- List of Saskatchewan provincial electoral districts
- List of Saskatchewan general elections
- Canadian provincial electoral districts
- Prince Albert — North-West Territories territorial electoral district (1870–1905)
