= Albert Victor Sterling =

Canadian politician

Albert Victor Sterling (died 1945) was a Canadian politician who represented Shellbrook in the Legislative Assembly of the province of Saskatchewan, Canada.

When he died he was replaced in a by-election by Guy Franklin Van Eaton.
