= Tracy Medve =

Canadian airline executive

Tracy Medve is a Canadian airline executive. She was the first woman inducted as an Honorary Life Member of the Air Transport Association of Canada (ATAC).

== Early years ==
Medve grew up in Prince Albert, Saskatchewan, Canada, and as a child her father took her flying in his Cessna aircraft. She studied law at the University of Saskatchewan, graduating in 1981, and worked in Regina, Saskatchewan until 1985.

== Career ==
In 1985, Medve contacted Albert Ethier, owner of then-Saskatoon-based Norcanair, seeking a position in his company. Initially she worked in aircraft transactions, labour negotiations and facilities management, and later moved to senior management positions with Time Air, Canadian Partner and Canadian Regional Airlines. In 1992, she co-founded C.T. AeroProjects, a Calgary-based consultancy firm specialising in air transport resource management. One of the company's clients, NorTerra, expressed interest in buying Canadian North from Canadian Airlines, and Medve and C.T. AeroProjects assisted NorTerra with the acquisition. The purchase was completed in 1998 and in 2007 Medve became the president of Canadian North. In 2013 she left Canadian North and became the president of KF Aerospace and the chair of the Air Transport Association of Canada.

Medve is a member of the Air Transport Association of Canada Board, the Northern Air Transport Association Board and the University of British Columbia, Okanagan External Advisory Board. She is also a past member of the Transportation Appeal Tribunal of Canada.

=== Recognition ===
In 2010, she was inducted as an Honorary Life Member with the Air Transport Association of Canada. Medve was the first woman to receive this honour. In 2015, Medve received the Elsie MacGill Northern Lights Award for Business.
