= Saskatchewan (Provisional District) =

Former federal electoral district in the North-West Territories, Canada

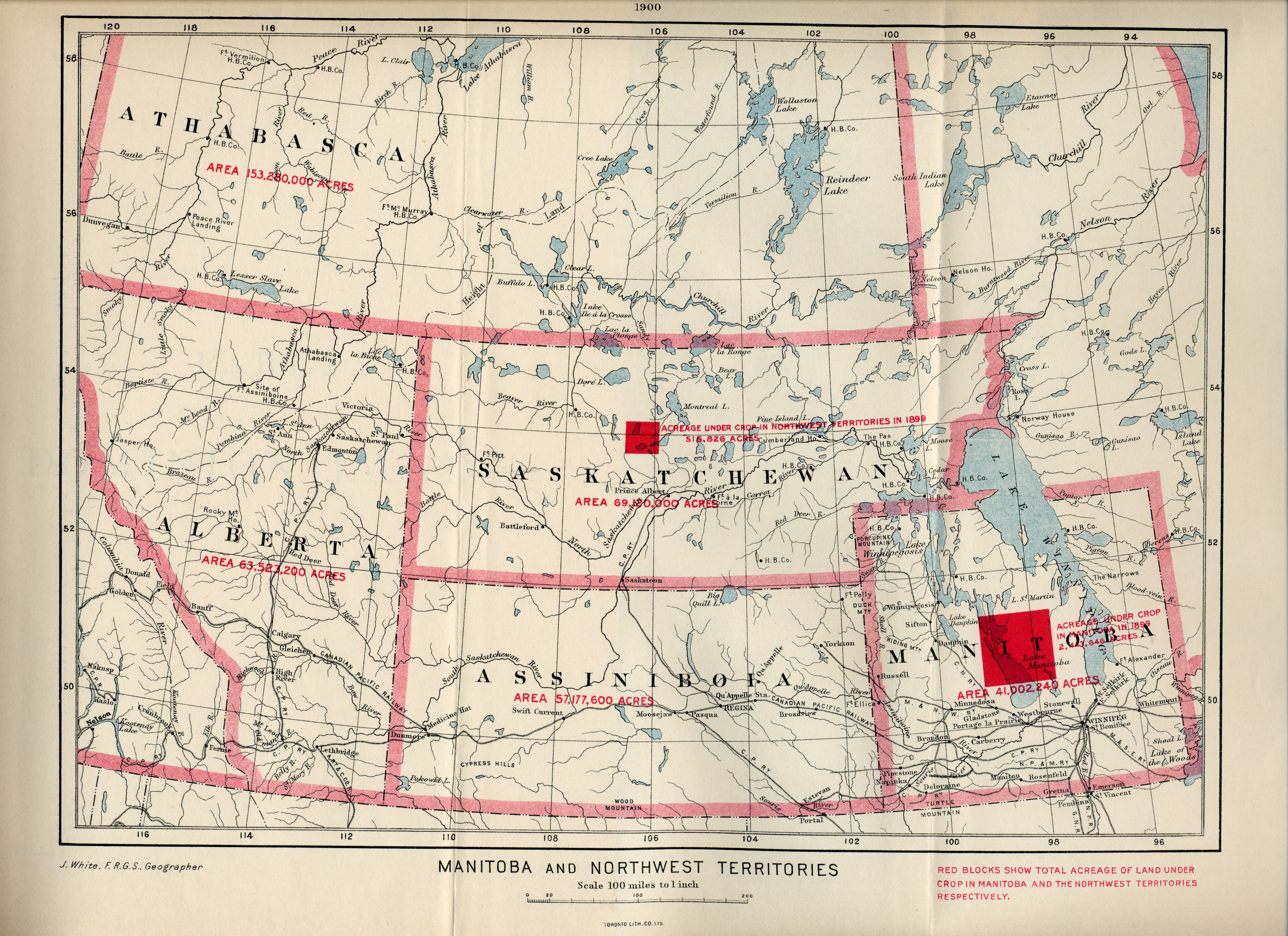
A 1900 map showing the District of Saskatchewan

The Provisional District of Saskatchewan was a federal electoral district in North-West Territories, Canada, that was represented in the House of Commons of Canada from 1887 to 1905. This riding was created in 1886. It consisted of the Provisional District of Saskatchewan.

The electoral district of Saskatchewan was originally within the geographical region of the North-West Territories. With the creation of the province of Saskatchewan in 1905, this riding, with territory in Alberta as well, was replaced in 1905 by Saskatchewan riding within the province of Saskatchewan.

== Election results ==
1887 Canadian federal election
| Party | Candidate | Votes |
|---|---|---|
| Conservative | Day Hort MacDowall | 718 |
| Liberal | David Laird | 552 |

1891 Canadian federal election
| Party | Candidate | Votes |
|---|---|---|
| Conservative | Day Hort MacDowall | 950 |
| Liberal | Hugh John Montgomery | 667 |

1896 Canadian federal election
| Party | Candidate | Votes | % | Elected |
|---|---|---|---|---|
| Liberal | Wilfrid Laurier | 988 | 46.06 | ✓ |
| Conservative | James McKay | 944 | 44.01 | |
| Independent | William Craig | 213 | 9.93 | |
| Total valid votes | | 2,145 | 100.00 | |
Source(s) "Saskatchewan (Provisional District), Northwest Territories (1886-06-02 - 1908-09-16)". History of Federal Ridings Since 1867. Library of Parliament.

Laurier resigned this seat, having also won in Quebec East. (Hon. W. Laurier appointed Prime Minister, July 11, 1896)

By-election:

By-election on 19 December 1896
| Party | Candidate | Votes |
| Liberal | Thomas Osborne Davis | 1,060 |
| Conservative | MCPHAIL, J.R. | 876 |

1900 Canadian federal election
| Party | Candidate | Votes |
|---|---|---|
| Liberal | Thomas Osborne Davis | 1,635 |
| Conservative | SPENCE, T.C. | 894 |

1904 Canadian federal election
| Party | Candidate | Votes |
|---|---|---|
| Liberal | John Henderson Lamont | 2,183 |
| Conservative | McKay, Thomas | 1,347 |

== See also ==
- List of Canadian electoral districts
- Historical federal electoral districts of Canada
