= Saskatchewan Rivers =

Provincial electoral district in Saskatchewan, Canada

Coordinates: 53°35′N 105°30′W

Saskatchewan electoral district

Provincial electoral district
- Legislature: Legislative Assembly of Saskatchewan
MLA
Eric Schmalz
Saskatchewan
- District created: 1994
- First contested: 1995
- Last contested: 2024

Demographics
- Electors: 10,240
- Census division(s): Division 14, 15, 16

Saskatchewan Rivers is a provincial electoral district for the Legislative Assembly of Saskatchewan, Canada. This constituency is located where the North Saskatchewan River and the South Saskatchewan River merge. Communities in the riding include the towns of Big River and Choiceland; and the villages of White Fox, Debden, Meath Park, Candle Lake, Smeaton, and Christopher Lake.

== Members of the Legislative Assembly ==
The district has elected the following MLAs:

Legislature	Years	Member	Party
23rd	1995–1999	Jack Langford	New Democratic Party
24th	1999–2003	Daryl Wiberg	Saskatchewan Party
25th	2003–2007	Lon Borgerson	New Democratic Party
26th	2007–2011	Nadine Wilson	Saskatchewan Party
27th	2011–2016	Nadine Wilson	Saskatchewan Party
28th	2016–2020	Nadine Wilson	Saskatchewan Party
29th	2020–2021	Nadine Wilson	Saskatchewan Party
29th	2021–2022	Nadine Wilson	Independent
29th	2022–present	Nadine Wilson	Saskatchewan United Party
30th	2024–present	Eric Schmalz	Saskatchewan Party

== Election results ==
2024 Saskatchewan general election
Party	Candidate	Votes	%	±%
Saskatchewan	Eric Schmalz	3,802	53.8	-8.42
New Democratic	Doug Racine	1,960	27.7	+1.7
Saskatchewan United	Nadine Wilson	804	11.4	-50.82
Progressive Conservative	Bernard Lalonde	416	5.9	-0.1
Green	Alesha Bruce	84	1.2	-0.45
Total valid votes		7,066		
Total rejected ballots			–	
Turnout		7,066	–	–
Eligible voters		–		
Saskatchewan hold		Swing		–
Source: Elections Saskatchewan

2020 Saskatchewan general election
Party	Candidate	Votes	%	±%
Saskatchewan	Nadine Wilson	4,401	62.22	-4.83
New Democratic	Lyle Whitefish	1,839	26.00	-3.39
Progressive Conservative	Shaun Harris	424	6.00	-
Buffalo	Fred Lackie	292	4.13	–
Green	Marcia Neault	117	1.65	-
Total valid votes		7,073	98.94	
Total rejected ballots		76	1.06	–
Turnout		7,149	–	–
Eligible voters		–		
Saskatchewan hold		Swing		–
Source: Elections Saskatchewan

2016 Saskatchewan general election
Party	Candidate	Votes	%	±%
Saskatchewan	Nadine Wilson	4,584	67.03	+1.11
New Democratic	Lyle Whitefish	2,010	29.39	-1.80
Liberal	Brenda McKnight	244	3.56	-
Total valid votes		6,838	100.0	
Eligible voters		–		
Source: Elections Saskatchewan

2011 Saskatchewan general election
Party	Candidate	Votes	%	±%
Saskatchewan	Nadine Wilson	4,749	65.92	+11.00
NDP	Jeanette Wicinski-Dunn	2,247	31.19	-10.00
Green	Paul-Emile L'Heureux	208	2.89	-
Total		7,204	100.00%	

2007 Saskatchewan general election
Party	Candidate	Votes	%	±%
Saskatchewan	Nadine Wilson	4,294	54.92	+15.75
NDP	Lon Borgerson	3,221	41.19	-6.46
Liberal	Alyssa Fullerton	304	3.89	-6.69
Total		7,819	100.00%	

2003 Saskatchewan general election
Party	Candidate	Votes	%	±%
NDP	Lon Borgerson	3,446	47.65	+5.07
Saskatchewan	Daryl Wiberg	2,833	39.17	-5.71
Liberal	Cliff Rose	765	10.58	-1.96
New Green	Gerald Regnitter	188	2.60	*
Total		7,232	100.00%	

1999 Saskatchewan general election
Party	Candidate	Votes	%	±%
Saskatchewan	Daryl Wiberg	3,048	44.88	*
NDP	Jack Langford	2,892	42.58	-4.81
Liberal	Stan J. Kowal	852	12.54	-19.73
Total		6,792	100.00%	

1995 Saskatchewan general election
Party	Candidate	Votes	%	±%
NDP	Jack Langford	3,199	47.39	*
Liberal	Wyett Myers	2,178	32.27	*
Prog. Conservative	Albert H. Provost	1,373	20.34	*
Total		6,750	100.00%	

== See also ==
- List of Saskatchewan provincial electoral districts
- List of Saskatchewan general elections
- Canadian provincial electoral districts
