= James McKay (Canadian politician) =

Canadian politician (1862–1931)

James McKay (July 12, 1862 – December 1, 1931) was a lawyer, judge and political figure in Saskatchewan, Canada. He represented Prince Albert in the House of Commons of Canada from 1911 to 1914 as a Conservative.

== Career ==
He was born at Fort Ellice in Rupert's Land, the son of William McKay and Mary Cook, and was educated there, in Westbourne and at St. John's College at the University of Manitoba. While at St. John's, he won, in 1877, the Dufferin Bronze Medal for Ancient and Modern History. McKay articled in law and was called to the Manitoba bar in 1886. While a law student, he served in C Company of the Winnipeg Rifles during the North-West Rebellion.

McKay practised law in Winnipeg and, after 1887, in Prince Albert, Saskatchewan. He was a crown prosecutor from 1888 to 1897. In 1891, he was named King's Counsel. He married Florence Annie Reid in 1900.

McKay was an unsuccessful candidate for the Saskatchewan (Provisional District) seat in the House of Commons in 1896, losing to Wilfrid Laurier, and also ran unsuccessfully in Prince Albert in 1908 before taking the seat in the 1911 federal election. McKay resigned his seat in the House of Commons in 1914 after he was named to the Supreme Court of Saskatchewan. In 1918, he was named to the Court of King's Bench and, in 1921, to the Court of Appeal for Saskatchewan. McKay also served on the board of governors for the University of Saskatchewan.

== Electoral record ==
1911 Canadian federal election: Prince Albert
Party	Candidate	Votes	%	±%
Conservative	James McKay	3,316	52.8	+6.1
Liberal	William Winfield Rutan	2,961	47.2	-4.2
Total valid votes		6,277	100.0	
