= Daryl Wiberg =

Canadian politician

MLA for Saskatchewan Rivers
- In office 1999–2003

Personal details
- Born: 1951 (age 74–75)
- Party: Saskatchewan Party

Daryl Wiberg (born 1951) was a Canadian politician who served in the Legislative Assembly of Saskatchewan from 1999 to 2003, as a Saskatchewan Party member for the constituency of Saskatchewan Rivers.
