= Prince Albert (federal electoral district) =

Federal electoral district in Saskatchewan, Canada

Saskatchewan electoral district
- Interactive map of riding boundaries from the 2025 federal election. Point indicates the city of Prince Albert.
- Coordinates: 53.203°N 104.841°W

Federal electoral district
- Legislature: House of Commons
MP
Randy Hoback
Conservative
- District created: 1996; 30 years ago
- First contested: 1997
- Last contested: 2025
- District webpage: profile, map

Demographics
- Population (2011): 79,344
- Electors (2015): 55,873
- Area (km²): 18,927
- Pop. density (per km²): 4.2
- Census subdivision(s): Prince Albert, Melfort, Nipawin, Prince Albert, Buckland, Tisdale, Shellbrook, Big River, Shellbrook, Ahtahkakoop

Prince Albert is a federal electoral district in Saskatchewan, Canada, that has been represented in the House of Commons of Canada from 1908 to 1988, and since 1997. It is one of two districts which has been represented by two different Prime Ministers: William Lyon Mackenzie King from 1926 to 1945, and John Diefenbaker from 1953 to 1979; the district of Quebec East was the other. It is also the only district where two future Prime Ministers competed against each other – King against Diefenbaker, in the 1926 election.

== Geography ==
This riding is found in the central part of the province, in the transitional area between the Aspen parkland and boreal forest biomes. The major centre of the riding, and its namesake, is the city of Prince Albert which has a rich political history. Smaller centres in the riding include Nipawin, Melfort, and Tisdale.

== History ==
The electoral district was first created in 1907 from portions of Humboldt, Mackenzie, and Saskatchewan. It existed in this form until 1987 when it was abolished into Prince Albert—Churchill River, Saskatoon—Humboldt, and The Battlefords—Meadow Lake. It was re-created in 1996 from portions of the Prince Albert—Churchill River, Mackenzie, and Saskatoon—Humboldt ridings.

While the city of Prince Albert has significant NDP support, the rural areas are among the most conservative in Saskatchewan and the country. As a result, it has been in the hands of a centre-right party for its entire existence in its current incarnation.

This riding lost a fraction of territory to Desnethé—Missinippi—Churchill River, and gained territory from Saskatoon—Humboldt, Desnethé—Missinippi—Churchill River and a fraction from Saskatoon—Wanuskewin during the 2012 electoral redistribution.

During the campaign for the 2021 election, Liberal candidate, Estelle Hjertaas, had several of her campaign signs vandalized.

=== Historical boundaries ===
1905 representation order

1914 representation order

1924 representation order

1933 representation order

1947 representation order

1952 representation order

1966 representation order

1976 representation order

1987 representation order (as Prince Albert—Churchill River)

1996 representation order

2003 representation order

2013 representation order

2023 final report

== Demographics ==
Panethnic groups in Prince Albert (2011−2021)
Panethnic group	2021		2016		2011	
Panethnic group	Pop.	%	Pop.	%	Pop.	%
European (Note: Statistic includes all persons that did not make up part of a visible minority or an indigenous identity.)	46,375	59.66%	49,435	64.1%	52,840	68.98%
Indigenous	25,730	33.1%	23,625	30.63%	21,880	28.56%
Southeast Asian (Note: Statistic includes total responses of "Filipino" and "Southeast Asian" under visible minority section on census.)	2,530	3.25%	1,935	2.51%	540	0.7%
South Asian	1,215	1.56%	790	1.02%	275	0.36%
African	950	1.22%	655	0.85%	270	0.35%
East Asian (Note: Statistic includes total responses of "Chinese", "Korean", and "Japanese" under visible minority section on census.)	290	0.37%	340	0.44%	570	0.74%
Latin American	275	0.35%	120	0.16%	145	0.19%
Middle Eastern (Note: Statistic includes total responses of "West Asian" and "Arab" under visible minority section on census.)	185	0.24%	135	0.18%	40	0.05%
Other/multiracial (Note: Statistic includes total responses of "Visible minority, n.i.e." and "Multiple visible minorities" under visible minority section on census.)	180	0.23%	100	0.13%	45	0.06%
Total responses	77,730	96.15%	77,125	96.86%	76,605	96.55%
Total population	80,845	100%	79,625	100%	79,344	100%
Notes: Totals greater than 100% due to multiple origin responses. Demographics based on 2012 Canadian federal electoral redistribution riding boundaries.

== Members of Parliament ==
Parliament	Years	Member	Party
Prince Albert; Riding created from Humboldt, Mackenzie and Saskatchewan
11th	1908–1911	William Winfield Rutan	Liberal
12th	1911–1914	James McKay	Conservative
12th	1915–1917	Samuel James Donaldson	Conservative
13th	1917–1920	Andrew Knox	Government (Unionist)
13th	1920–1921	Andrew Knox	Progressive
14th	1921–1925	Andrew Knox	Progressive
15th	1925–1926	Charles McDonald	Liberal
16th	1926–1930	William Lyon Mackenzie King	Liberal
17th	1930–1935	William Lyon Mackenzie King	Liberal
18th	1935–1940	William Lyon Mackenzie King	Liberal
19th	1940–1945	William Lyon Mackenzie King	Liberal
20th	1945–1949	Edward LeRoy Bowerman	Co-operative Commonwealth
21st	1949–1953	Francis Helme	Liberal
22nd	1953–1957	John Diefenbaker	Progressive Conservative
23rd	1957–1958	John Diefenbaker	Progressive Conservative
24th	1958–1962	John Diefenbaker	Progressive Conservative
25th	1962–1963	John Diefenbaker	Progressive Conservative
26th	1963–1965	John Diefenbaker	Progressive Conservative
27th	1965–1968	John Diefenbaker	Progressive Conservative
28th	1968–1972	John Diefenbaker	Progressive Conservative
29th	1972–1974	John Diefenbaker	Progressive Conservative
30th	1974–1979	John Diefenbaker	Progressive Conservative
31st	1979–1979	John Diefenbaker	Progressive Conservative
31st	1979–1980	Stan Hovdebo	New Democratic
32nd	1980–1984	Stan Hovdebo	New Democratic
33rd	1984–1988	Stan Hovdebo	New Democratic
Riding dissolved into Prince Albert—Churchill River, Saskatoon—Humboldt and The Battlefords—Meadow Lake
Riding re-created from Prince Albert—Churchill River, Mackenzie and Saskatoon—Humboldt
36th	1997–2000	Derrek Konrad	Reform
36th	2000–2000	Derrek Konrad	Alliance
37th	2000–2003	Brian Fitzpatrick	Alliance
37th	2003–2004	Brian Fitzpatrick	Conservative
38th	2004–2006	Brian Fitzpatrick	Conservative
39th	2006–2008	Brian Fitzpatrick	Conservative
40th	2008–2011	Randy Hoback	Conservative
41st	2011–2015	Randy Hoback	Conservative
42nd	2015–2019	Randy Hoback	Conservative
43rd	2019–2021	Randy Hoback	Conservative
44th	2021–2025	Randy Hoback	Conservative
45th	2025–present	Randy Hoback	Conservative

== Election results ==
=== 1997–present ===
Graph of election results in Prince Albert (since 1997, minor parties that never got 2% of the vote or didn't run consistently are omitted)

2025 Canadian federal election
** Preliminary results — Not yet official **
Party	Candidate	Votes	%	±%	Expenditures
Conservative	Randy Hoback	27,763	71.5%		
Liberal	Christopher Hadubiak	7,451	19.2%		
New Democratic	Virginia Kutzan	3,630	9.3%		
Total valid votes/expense limit					
Total rejected ballots					
Turnout					
Eligible voters					
Source: Elections Canada

2021 federal election redistributed results
Party	Vote	%
Conservative	23,253	64.09
New Democratic	5,448	15.02
Liberal	4,284	11.81
People's	2,496	6.88
Green	398	1.10
Others	403	1.11

2021 Canadian federal election
Party	Candidate	Votes	%	±%	Expenditures
Conservative	Randy Hoback	22,340	64.9	-2.8	$43,253.20
New Democratic	Ken MacDougall	5,214	15.1	-2.3	$5,527.17
Liberal	Estelle Hjertaas	3,653	10.6	+0.3	$19,152.96
People's	Joseph McCrea	2,388	6.9	+4.9	$3,603.87
Maverick	Heather Schmitt	466	1.4	-	$7,787.78
Green	Hamish Graham	364	1.1	-1.0	$0.00
Total valid votes/expense limit		34,425	100.0	–	$110,268.45
Total rejected ballots		161	0.5		
Turnout		34,586	60.2		
Eligible voters		57,483			
Source: Elections Canada

2019 Canadian federal election
Party	Candidate	Votes	%	±%	Expenditures
Conservative	Randy Hoback	26,891	67.7	+17.91	$47,630.00
New Democratic	Harmony Johnson-Harder	6,925	17.4	-11.06	none listed
Liberal	Estelle Hjertaas	4,107	10.3	-9.52	$32,348.20
Green	Kerri Wall	839	2.1	+0.17	$0.00
People's	Kelly Day	778	2.0	-	$2,327.52
Veterans Coalition	Brian Littlepine	170	0.4	-	none listed
Total valid votes/expense limit		39,710	100.0		
Total rejected ballots		237			
Turnout		39,947	69.8		
Eligible voters		57,200			
Conservative hold		Swing		+14.49	
Source: Elections Canada

2015 Canadian federal election
Party	Candidate	Votes	%	±%	Expenditures
Conservative	Randy Hoback	19,673	49.79	-12.63	$150,007.16
New Democratic	Lon Borgerson	11,244	28.46	-3.03	$73,259.98
Liberal	Gordon Kirkby	7,832	19.82	+16.38	$10,644.06
Green	Byron Tenkink	761	1.93	-0.29	$422.40
Total valid votes/expense limit		39,510	100.0		$210,065.49
Total rejected ballots		103	–	–	
Turnout		39,613	–	–	
Eligible voters		55,873			
Source: Elections Canada

2011 federal election redistributed results
Party	Vote	%
Conservative	20,774	62.42
New Democratic	10,482	31.49
Liberal	1,144	3.44
Green	740	2.22
Others	142	0.43

2011 Canadian federal election
Party	Candidate	Votes	%	±%	Expenditures
Conservative	Randy Hoback	19,214	62.2	+4.5	$79,394
New Democratic	Valerie Mushinski	9,841	31.8	+3.0	$47,100
Liberal	Ron Wassill	1,070	3.5	-4.5	$1,991
Green	Myk Brazier	666	2.2	-2.7	–
Canadian Action	Craig Batley	116	0.4	-0.2	–
Total valid votes/expense limit		30,907	100.0		$83,468
Total rejected ballots		88	0.3	+0.1	
Turnout		30,995	60.8	+5	
Eligible voters		50,946	–	–	

2008 Canadian federal election
Party	Candidate	Votes	%	±%	Expenditures
Conservative	Randy Hoback	16,542	57.7	+3.3	$72,129
New Democratic	Valerie Mushinski	8,243	28.8	+5.0	$47,075
Liberal	Lou Doderai	2,289	8.0	-11.4	$10,138
Green	Amanda Judith Marie Smytaniuk	1,413	4.9	+2.6	$2,466
Canadian Action	Craig Batley	167	0.6	–	$
Total valid votes/expense limit		28,654	100.0		$80,865
Total rejected ballots		55	0.2	-0.1	
Turnout		28,709	56	-6	

2006 Canadian federal election
Party	Candidate	Votes	%	±%	Expenditures
Conservative	Brian Fitzpatrick	17,271	54.4	+7.2	$65,910
New Democratic	Valerie Mushinski	7,562	23.8	-1.3	$23,690
Liberal	Patrick Jahn	6,149	19.4	-4.8	$28,756
Green	Marc Loiselle	744	2.4	-1.1	$350
Total valid votes		31,726	100.0		–
Total rejected ballots		85	0.3	-0.1	
Turnout		31,811	61.5%	+8.0	

2004 Canadian federal election
Party	Candidate	Votes	%	±%	Expenditures
Conservative	Brian Fitzpatrick	13,576	47.3	-10.4	$69,931
New Democratic	Don Hovdebo	7,221	25.1	+4.6	$30,743
Liberal	Patrick Jahn	6,929	24.1	+3.4	$42,440
Green	Marc Loiselle	987	3.4	+2.5	$110
Total valid votes		28,713	100.0		–
Total rejected ballots		107	0.4	+0.2	
Turnout		28,820	53.5	-10.7	

Note: Conservative vote is compared to the total of the Canadian Alliance vote and Progressive Conservative vote in 2000 election.

2000 Canadian federal election
Party	Candidate	Votes	%	±%	Expenditures
Alliance	Brian Fitzpatrick	14,825	45.6	+7.5	$58,048
Liberal	Tim Longworth	6,754	20.8	-0.4	$46,856
New Democratic	Dennis Nowoselsky	6,676	20.5	-11.2	$49,523
Progressive Conservative	David Orchard	3,943	12.1	+3.9	$63,282
Green	Benjamin Webster	317	1.0	–	$20
Total valid votes		32,515	100.0		–
Total rejected ballots		83	0.23		
Turnout		32,598	64.1	-0.4	

Note: Canadian Alliance vote is compared to the Reform vote in 1997 election.

1997 Canadian federal election
Party	Candidate	Votes	%	±%	Expenditures
Reform	Derrek Konrad	12,508	38.1	–	$55,562
New Democratic	Ray Funk	10,418	31.7	–	$59,376
Liberal	Gordon Kirkby	6,965	21.2	–	$37,643
Progressive Conservative	Brian Fripp	2,702	8.2	–	$13,911
Canadian Action	John Hrapchak	275	0.8	–	
Total valid votes		32,868	100.0		–
Total rejected ballots		107	0.3		
Turnout		32,975	64.5		

=== 1908–1988 ===
1984 Canadian federal election
Party	Candidate	Votes	%	±%
New Democratic	Stan Hovdebo	13,359	35.6	+0.8
Progressive Conservative	Gordon Dobrowolsky	13,062	34.8	+2.3
Liberal	J.H. Clyne Harradence	10,886	29.0	-3.8
Confederation of Regions	Tony Panas	262	0.7	
Total valid votes		37,569	100.0	

1980 Canadian federal election
Party	Candidate	Votes	%	±%
New Democratic	Stan Hovdebo	11,601	34.8	-3.2
Liberal	J.H. Clyne Harradence	10,919	32.8	+7.3
Progressive Conservative	Kris Eggum	10,819	32.5	-3.6
Total valid votes		33,339	100.0	
lop.parl.ca

Canadian federal by-election, 19 November 1979
Party	Candidate	Votes	%	±%
On Mr. Diefenbaker's death, 16 August 1979
New Democratic	Stan Hovdebo	10,941	38.0	+2.3
Progressive Conservative	Kris Eggum	10,385	36.0	-12.9
Liberal	J.H. Clyne Harradence	7,336	25.5	+10.1
Independent	John L. De Bruyne	147	0.5	
Total valid votes		28,809	100.0	

1979 Canadian federal election
Party	Candidate	Votes	%	±%
Progressive Conservative	John Diefenbaker	16,438	49.0	-10.2
New Democratic	Stan Hovdebo	11,979	35.7	+14.1
Liberal	Peter Abrametz	5,158	15.4	-2.7
Total valid votes		33,575	100.0	

1974 Canadian federal election
Party	Candidate	Votes	%	±%
Progressive Conservative	John Diefenbaker	17,787	59.1	-0.4
New Democratic	Thora E. Wiggens	6,496	21.6	-6.3
Liberal	Philip Edward West	5,426	18.0	+7.0
Social Credit	Joseph Gerrard Cools	366	1.2	-0.1
Total valid votes		30,075	100.0	

1972 Canadian federal election
Party	Candidate	Votes	%	±%
Progressive Conservative	John Diefenbaker	19,410	59.5	+3.5
New Democratic	Bill Berezowsky	9,115	27.9	-0.2
Liberal	Leo F. Pinel	3,613	11.1	-4.7
Social Credit	Claude Campagna	421	1.3	
Independent	Bill Fair	61	0.2	
Total valid votes		32,620	100.0	

1968 Canadian federal election
Party	Candidate	Votes	%	±%
Progressive Conservative	John Diefenbaker	17,850	56.0	-9.0
New Democratic	Al Hartley	8,979	28.2	+10.6
Liberal	Philip Edward West	5,025	15.8	+1.4
Total valid votes		31,854	100.0	

1965 Canadian federal election
Party	Candidate	Votes	%	±%
Progressive Conservative	John Diefenbaker	15,635	65.1	-6.3
New Democratic	Peter Kachur	4,227	17.6	+4.1
Liberal	Lenore Ramsland Andrews	3,453	14.4	+1.5
Social Credit	John Dashchuk	718	3.0	+0.7
Total valid votes		24,033	100.0	

1963 Canadian federal election
Party	Candidate	Votes	%	±%
Progressive Conservative	John Diefenbaker	17,824	71.4	+0.6
New Democratic	Henry Merrifield Apps	3,373	13.5	-2.7
Liberal	Harold John Fraser	3,206	12.8	+2.2
Social Credit	Kenneth Solheim	565	2.3	-0.2
Total valid votes		24,968	100.0	

1962 Canadian federal election
Party	Candidate	Votes	%	±%
Progressive Conservative	John Diefenbaker	18,276	70.8	-1.3
New Democratic	Roger C. Carter	4,173	16.2	-0.7
Liberal	George William Newell	2,745	10.6	-0.4
Social Credit	Ken Solheim	627	2.4	
Total valid votes		25,821	100.0	

Note: NDP vote is compared to CCF vote in 1958 election.

1958 Canadian federal election
Party	Candidate	Votes	%	±%
Progressive Conservative	John Diefenbaker	16,583	72.1	+19.0
Co-operative Commonwealth	Thora Elizabeth Wiggens	3,870	16.8	-8.1
Liberal	Ernie Unruh	2,538	11.0	-11.0
Total valid votes		22,991	100.0	

1957 Canadian federal election
Party	Candidate	Votes	%	±%
Progressive Conservative	John Diefenbaker	12,349	53.1	+9.0
Co-operative Commonwealth	Robert Nathaniel Gooding	5,795	24.9	-6.0
Liberal	Russell Ernest Partridge	5,119	22.0	-1.7
Total valid votes		23,263	100.0	

1953 Canadian federal election
Party	Candidate	Votes	%	±%
Progressive Conservative	John Diefenbaker	10,038	44.1	+31.9
Co-operative Commonwealth	David Frederick Corney	7,037	30.9	-8.8
Liberal	Floyd Robert Glass	5,409	23.7	-24.4
Labor–Progressive	Phyllis Clarke	295	1.3	
Total valid votes		22,779	100.0	

1949 Canadian federal election
Party	Candidate	Votes	%	±%
Liberal	Francis Heselton Helme	8,916	48.2	+7.8
Co-operative Commonwealth	Edward LeRoy Bowerman	7,341	39.6	-1.3
Progressive Conservative	George Henry Whitter	2,258	12.2	-2.1
Total valid votes		18,515	100.0	

1945 Canadian federal election
Party	Candidate	Votes	%	±%	Elected
Co-operative Commonwealth	Edward LeRoy Bowerman	7,928	40.99	+30.0	✓
Liberal	William Lyon Mackenzie King	7,799	40.32	−5.6	
Progressive Conservative	Walter Hemming Nelson	2,768	14.31		
Social Credit	Joshua Norman Haldeman	847	4.38		
Total valid votes		19,342	100.0		
Co-operative Commonwealth gain from Liberal		Swing		+17.8	
Source(s) "Prince Albert, Saskatchewan (1908-09-17 - 1988-09-30)". History of Federal Ridings Since 1867. Library of Parliament.

1940 Canadian federal election
Party	Candidate	Votes	%	±%	Elected
Liberal	William Lyon Mackenzie King	8,310	45.96	−8.7	✓
National-Unity	Robert Rae Manville	7,534	41.67		
Co-operative Commonwealth	Peter William Strelive	1,993	11.02	+2.2	
Communist	Alfred Cowie Campbell	243	1.34		
Total valid votes		18,080	100.0		
Source(s) "Prince Albert, Saskatchewan (1908-09-17 - 1988-09-30)". History of Federal Ridings Since 1867. Library of Parliament.

1935 Canadian federal election
Party	Candidate	Votes	%	±%	Elected
Liberal	William Lyon Mackenzie King	9,087	54.67	+1.2	✓
Social Credit	Alexander Rupert Bedard	3,185	19.16		
Conservative	Tom Francis Graves	2,880	17.33	−29.2	
Co-operative Commonwealth	Tom Johnston	1,469	8.84		
Total valid votes		16,621	100.0		
Source(s) "Prince Albert, Saskatchewan (1908-09-17 - 1988-09-30)". History of Federal Ridings Since 1867. Library of Parliament.

1930 Canadian federal election
Party	Candidate	Votes	%	±%	Elected
Liberal	William Lyon Mackenzie King	9,283	53.43		✓
Conservative	George Braden	8,091	46.57		
Total valid votes		17,374	100.0		
Source(s) "Prince Albert, Saskatchewan (1908-09-17 - 1988-09-30)". History of Federal Ridings Since 1867. Library of Parliament.

Canadian federal by-election, November 2, 1926 On Mr. King's acceptance of an office of emolument under the Crown, October 11, 1926.
Party	Candidate	Votes	Elected
Liberal	William Lyon Mackenzie King	acclaimed	✓
Total valid votes		-	-
Source(s) "Prince Albert, Saskatchewan (1908-09-17 - 1988-09-30)". History of Federal Ridings Since 1867. Library of Parliament.

1926 Canadian federal election
Party	Candidate	Votes	%	±%	Elected
Liberal	William Lyon Mackenzie King	8,933	64.87	−12.6	✓
Conservative	John Diefenbaker	4,838	35.13		
Total valid votes		13,771	100.0		
Source(s) "Prince Albert, Saskatchewan (1908-09-17 - 1988-09-30)". History of Federal Ridings Since 1867. Library of Parliament.

Canadian federal by-election, February 15, 1926 Charles McDonald's resignation on January 15, 1926.
Party	Candidate	Votes	%	±%	Elected
Liberal	William Lyon Mackenzie King	7,920	77.50	+26.3	✓
Independent	David Luther Burgess	2,299	22.50		
Total valid votes		10,219	100.0		
History of Federal Ridings Since 1867

1925 Canadian federal election
Party	Candidate	Votes	%	±%	Elected
Liberal	Charles McDonald	5,301	51.2	+20.0	✓
Progressive	Andrew Knox	2,638	25.5	-28.1	
Conservative	John Diefenbaker	2,412	23.3	+7.7	
Total valid votes		10,351	100.0		
Source(s) "Prince Albert, Saskatchewan (1908-09-17 - 1988-09-30)". History of Federal Ridings Since 1867. Library of Parliament.

1921 Canadian federal election
Party	Candidate	Votes	%	±%
Progressive	Andrew Knox	8,525	53.6	
Liberal	Lorenzo William Brigham	4,962	31.2	-0.1
Conservative	David Wilson Paul	2,417	15.2	-56.5
Total valid votes		15,904	100.0	

Note: Conservative vote is compared to Unionist vote in 1917 election.

1917 Canadian federal election
Party	Candidate	Votes	%	±%
Government (Unionist)	Andrew Knox	6,589	68.7	+15.9
Opposition (Laurier Liberals)	Samuel McLeod	2,999	31.3	-15.9
Total valid votes		9,588	100.0	

Note: Unionist vote is compared to Liberal-Conservative vote in 1911 election.

By-election on 1 February 1915 On Mr. McKay being appointed Judge, 16 December 1914
Party	Candidate	Votes
Conservative	Samuel James Donaldson	acclaimed

1911 Canadian federal election
Party	Candidate	Votes	%	±%
Conservative	James McKay	3,316	52.8	+6.1
Liberal	William Winfield Rutan	2,961	47.2	-4.2
Total valid votes		6,277	100.0	

1908 Canadian federal election
Party	Candidate	Votes	%
Liberal	William Winfield Rutan	2,413	51.4
Conservative	James McKay	2,194	46.7
Independent Liberal	W.H. Joseph Jaxon	87	1.9
Total valid votes		4,694	100.0

== See also ==
- List of Canadian electoral districts
- Historical federal electoral districts of Canada

Parliament of Canada
Preceded by York North; Portage la Prairie; Calgary West; Quebec East	Constituency represented by the prime minister 1925–1926; 1926–1930; 1935–1945; 1957–1963	Succeeded by Portage la Prairie; Calgary West; Glengarry; Algoma East
