= Derrek Konrad =

Canadian politician

Member of Parliament for Prince Albert
- In office 1997–2000
- Preceded by: riding created
- Succeeded by: Brian Fitzpatrick

Personal details
- Born: 12 December 1943 (age 82) Brooks, Alberta
- Party: Reform; Canadian Alliance

Derrek P. Konrad (born 12 December 1943 in Brooks, Alberta) was a member of the House of Commons of Canada from 1997 to 2000.

He was elected to the House of Commons of Canada for the Prince Albert electoral district in the 1997 federal election. He was a member of the Reform party, later renamed the Canadian Alliance. After serving in the 36th Canadian Parliament, he left federal politics after losing the riding's Canadian Alliance nomination to Brian Fitzpatrick for the 2000 federal election. One of the characteristics of his term was his adamant opposition to migration rights for First Nations People. He is quoted in Major Problems in American Indian History as having said "I can't for the life of me understand why they would need a special border crossing, unless they're beginning to see themselves as people with no border"
