= John Ernest Bradshaw =

Canadian politician

John Ernest Bradshaw (December 13, 1866 – December 25, 1917) was an English-born businessman and politician in Saskatchewan. He represented Prince Albert City in the Legislative Assembly of Saskatchewan from 1908 to 1917 as a Provincial Rights Party and then Conservative member.

He was born in Newport, Isle of Wight, the son of Robert Bradshaw, and is believed to have come to Canada with his family in 1880, settling in Toronto, Ontario. Bradshaw worked at a bank in Duluth, Minnesota and then joined the Hudson's Bay Company in Winnipeg. He was transferred to Prince Albert, Saskatchewan as a manager for the company. In 1894, Bradshaw married Agnes Thompson. In Prince Albert, he opened his own general store and established an insurance agency. Bradshaw served on the city council for Prince Albert and was mayor in 1906. He ran unsuccessfully for a seat in the provincial assembly in a 1907 by-election before being elected in the general election held the following year. Bradshaw organized the 243rd Infantry Battalion during World War I but was struck off strength in June 1917 when the 243rd was disbanded and returned home. He was defeated when he ran for reelection in 1917. Bradshaw died of a heart attack in Prince Albert at the age of 51.
