= Lloyd John Muller =

Canadian politician

Lloyd John Muller (June 21, 1937 – June 27, 2023) was a farmer and political figure in Saskatchewan. He represented Shellbrook-Torch River from 1982 to 1991 in the Legislative Assembly of Saskatchewan as a Progressive Conservative.

He was born in Prince Albert, Saskatchewan, the son of Ernest Muller. In 1958, Muller married Doreen Lillian Rask. He served as deputy speaker in the Saskatchewan assembly. Muller lived in Shellbrook. He was defeated by Jack Langford when he ran for re-election to the assembly in 1991.
