= John Marcel Cuelenaere =

Canadian politician and lawyer

John Marcel Cuelenaere, QC (September 9, 1910 – February 12, 1967) was a lawyer and political figure in Saskatchewan. He represented Shellbrook from 1964 to 1967 in the Legislative Assembly of Saskatchewan as a Liberal.

He was born in Duck Lake, Saskatchewan, the son of Emile Cuelenaere and Marie Pirat, both natives of Belgium; and was educated in Duck Lake, at Campion College in Regina and at the University of Saskatchewan, where he earned a law degree. Cuelenaere articled with John Diefenbaker's law firm and was called to the Saskatchewan bar in 1935. In 1947, he was named Queen's Counsel. He served as president of the Law Society of Saskatchewan and as vice-president of the Canadian Bar Association. Cuelenaere was also a member of Prince Albert city council and served as mayor from 1946 to 1954. He was a member of the senate and of the board of governors for the University of Saskatchewan. Cuelenaere served in the provincial cabinet as Minister of Natural Resources and as minister without portfolio. He died in office at the age of 56.
