= Thomas Clayton Davis =

Canadian politician

The Honourable Thomas Clayton Davis
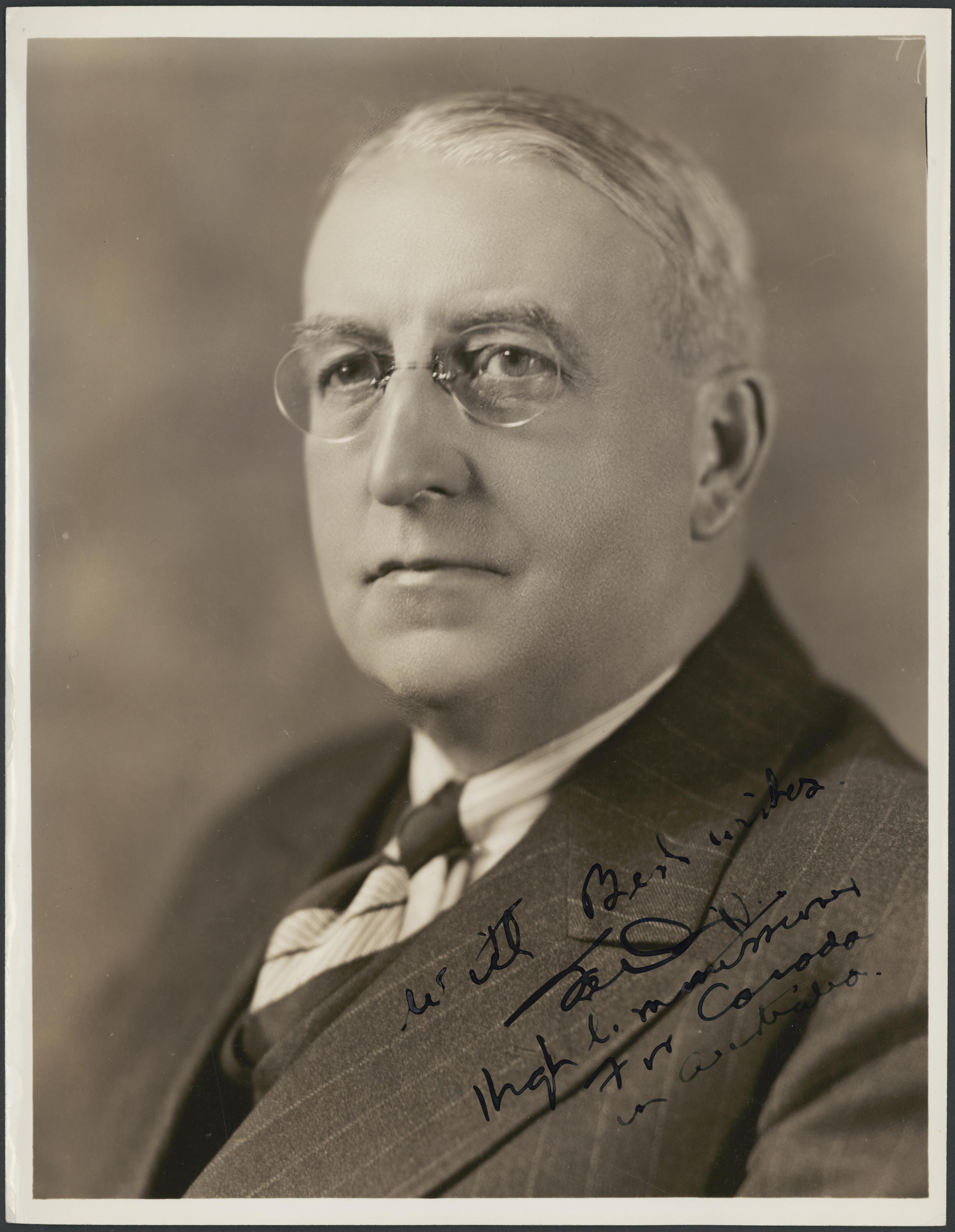
- Davis in 1944

Personal details
- Born: September 6, 1889 Prince Albert, Saskatchewan, Canada
- Died: January 21, 1960 (aged 70)
- Parent: Thomas Osborne Davis (father)

Thomas Clayton Davis (September 6, 1889 – January 21, 1960) was a Canadian lawyer, judge, diplomat and political figure in Saskatchewan. He represented Prince Albert in the Legislative Assembly of Saskatchewan from 1925 to 1939 as a Liberal.

He was born in Prince Albert, Saskatchewan (then a district of the Northwest Territories), the son of Thomas Osborne Davis, and was educated there and at St. John's College and Osgoode Hall. Davis then practised law in Prince Albert and later served two terms as alderman for the city; he was mayor from 1921 to 1924. Davis served in the provincial cabinet as Minister of Municipal Affairs and as Attorney General. He helped convince William Lyon Mackenzie King to create Prince Albert National Park, which was opened in 1928. In 1929, Davis defeated John Diefenbaker to retain his seat in the provincial assembly. He resigned his seat in the provincial assembly in 1939 to become a judge in the Saskatchewan Court of Appeal. Davis' judicial career ended in 1940 when he was named federal Deputy Minister of War Services; however, he did not resign from the Court of Appeal until 1948. He was named Canadian High Commissioner to Australia in 1943 and went on to serve as ambassador to China, Japan and West Germany. Davis retired from diplomatic service in 1957, moving to Victoria.

After Lyman Duff, the Chief Justice of the Supreme Court of Canada retired in 1944, Minister of Agriculture James Garfield Gardiner put Davis forward as a possible appointee to the Court. Gardiner also proposed William Melville Martin and James Wilfred Estey, who was ultimately appointed to fill the vacancy created by Duff's retirement.
