= Andrew Knox (Canadian politician) =

Canadian politician

Andrew Knox (April 26, 1866 – August 4, 1946) was an Irish-born farmer and political figure in Saskatchewan, Canada. He represented Prince Albert in the House of Commons of Canada from 1917 to 1925. He was elected to Parliament in the 1917 federal election as a Liberal-Unionist supporter of Sir Robert Borden's wartime Union Government. After the war, he crossed the floor to join the new Progressive Party.

He was born in County Londonderry, Ireland, the son of James Knox and his wife, Eliza Jane Boyd, and was educated in Coleraine. Knox came to Canada in 1890 and settled on a farm in Prince Albert, Saskatchewan. In 1900, he married Elizabeth Short. Knox was a director of the Saskatchewan Grain Growers' Association from 1907 to 1918. He served as mayor of Prince Albert from 1915 to 1917. He was a member of the Progressive Party from 1919 on and was re-elected as a Progressive MP in the 1921 federal election. Knox was defeated when he ran for reelection to the House of Commons in 1925 federal election.

1921 Canadian federal election: Prince Albert
Party	Candidate	Votes	%	±%
Progressive	Andrew Knox	8,525	53.6	
Liberal	Lorenzo William Brigham	4,962	31.2	-0.1
Conservative	David Wilson Paul	2,417	15.2	-56.5
Total valid votes		15,904	100.0	

Note: Conservative vote is compared to Unionist vote in 1917 election.

1917 Canadian federal election: Prince Albert
Party	Candidate	Votes	%	±%
Government (Unionist)	Andrew Knox	6,589	68.7	+15.9
Opposition (Laurier Liberals)	Samuel McLeod	2,999	31.3	-15.9
Total valid votes		9,588	100.0	

Note: Unionist vote is compared to Liberal-Conservative vote in 1911 election.
