= Diefenbaker (disambiguation) =

John Diefenbaker (1895–1979) was the 13th prime minister of Canada, serving as such from 1957 to 1963.

Diefenbaker may also refer to the following namesakes of the prime minister:

- Diefenbaker Canada Centre, archive and library in Saskatoon, Canada
- Diefenbaker the wolf, an animal character in the television series Due South
- Lake Diefenbaker, a Canadian lake
- Saskatoon John G. Diefenbaker International Airport, a Canadian airport

== See also ==
- The Canadian Coast Guard polar icebreaker CCGS Imnaryuaq was initially to be named John G. Diefenbaker.
