= Diefenbaker House =

Coordinates: 53.196007°N 105.761981°W

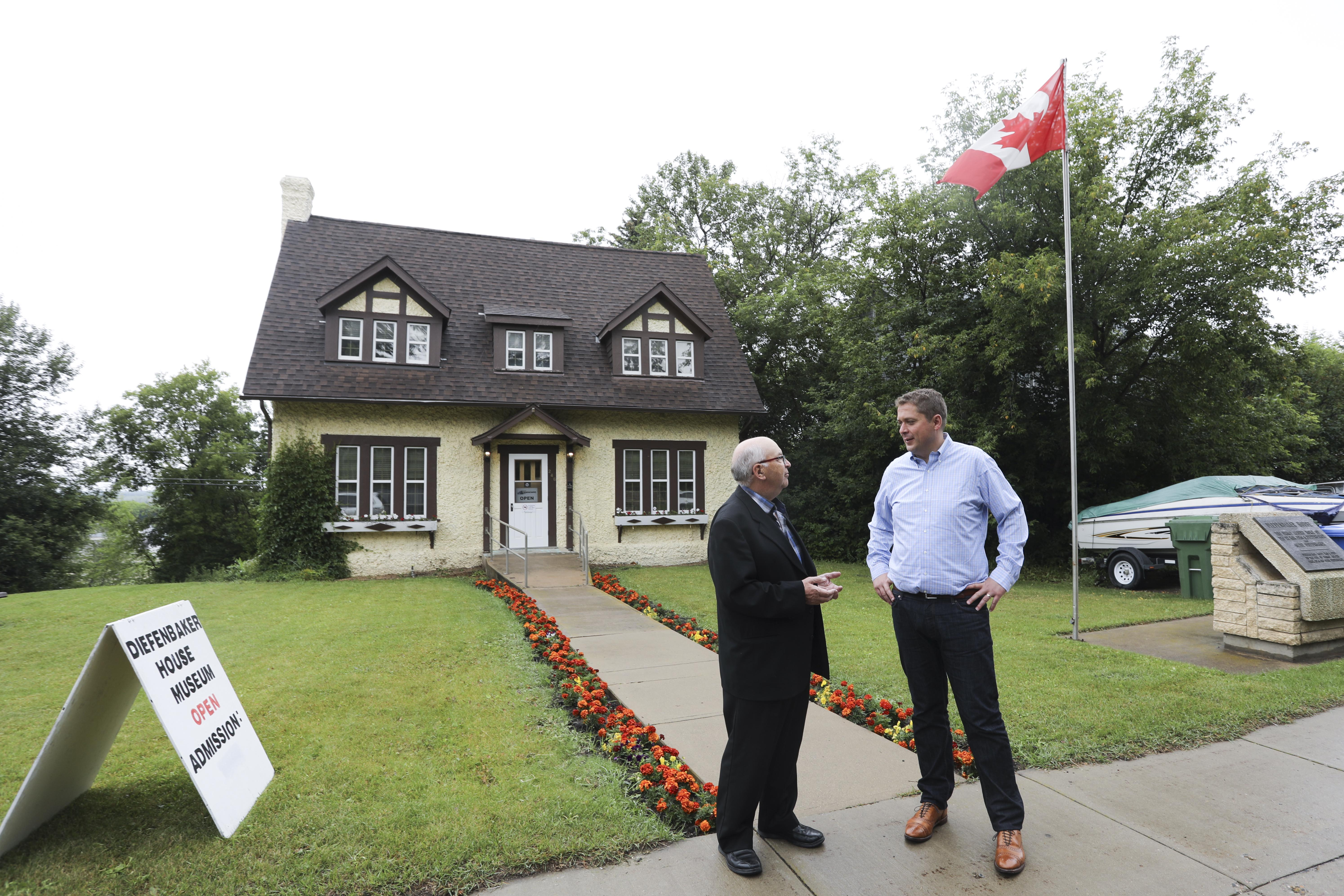
- Established: 1975
- Location: Prince Albert, Saskatchewan, Canada
- Type: Historic house museum
- Website: Diefenbaker House

Diefenbaker House is a museum in Prince Albert, Saskatchewan. The museum building was built in 1912 and purchased in 1947 from Mr. Wesley E. Acorn by The Right Honourable Prime Minister of Canada John Diefenbaker and his then wife Edna Diefenbaker. Olive Diefenbaker, John Diefenbaker's second wife, moved into the house after the death of Edna and stayed there until 1975 when they donated the house to the city of Prince Albert to convert it into a museum. The museum is operated by the Prince Albert Historical Society.

The John and Olive Diefenbaker Museum was designated a National Historic Site on January 12, 2018.

== Affiliations ==
The museum is affiliated with: CMA, CHIN, and Virtual Museum of Canada.

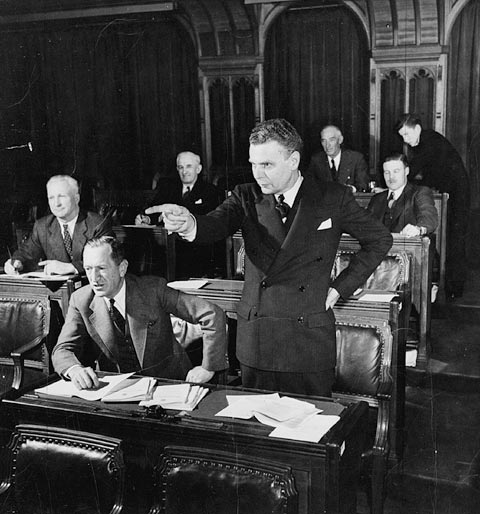
John Diefenbaker

== See also ==
- List of National Historic Sites in Saskatchewan
