= Edna Diefenbaker =

Canadian political spouse (1899–1951)

Personal details
- Born: Edna May Brower; November 30, 1899 Wawanesa, Manitoba, Canada
- Died: February 7, 1951 (aged 51)
- Party: Progressive Conservative
- Spouse: John Diefenbaker (m. 1929)

Edna May Diefenbaker (née Brower; November 30, 1899 – February 7, 1951) was the first wife of the 13th Prime Minister of Canada, John Diefenbaker.

== Early life ==
She was born in Wawanesa, Manitoba, and worked as a schoolteacher at Mayfair Elementary School in Saskatoon, Saskatchewan before marrying John Diefenbaker in 1929.

== Political life ==
Her marriage brought an end to her teaching career, and Diefenbaker devoted her energies to the advancement of her husband's political career. She would visit towns before her husband so that he was prepared with information on the inhabitants. She also edited her husband's speeches, and often acted as chauffeur, driving him to meetings. Perhaps most importantly, she helped him to overcome his shyness and develop into a "man of the people", which would help him in his future political successes.

Upon her husband's election as a Progressive Conservative member of Parliament Diefenbaker worked on his behalf in an unpaid capacity. She was a constant presence in the visitor's gallery in the House of Commons of Canada, and played an important role in establishing close relationships between her husband and reporters in the Ottawa press gallery.

William Lyon Mackenzie King once asserted that if he had met Edna before John did, she would have become his wife instead of John's.

John, however, may have had at least one extramarital affair during their marriage, as a group of brothers with a significant physical resemblance to John Diefenbaker later learned that their father, who had been placed for adoption in 1939, was the birth son of the Diefenbakers' housekeeper. Although John had no children with either of his wives who could take DNA tests to confirm a relationship, the brothers did get a DNA match to another man, George Dryden, who also already believed that John Diefenbaker was his biological father, although he was born during John's second marriage following Edna's death.

The Diefenbaker House in Prince Albert, Saskatchewan, was purchased by John and Edna during their marriage.

== Illness and death ==
In later years, she suffered from depression as she entered menopause, and was subjected to electroshock treatment.

She died of leukaemia in 1951, six years before her husband became prime minister. MPs in the House of Commons of Canada gave her "unprecedented eulogies" for a non-MP. John Diefenbaker later married Olive Palmer, his wife during his term as prime minister. Edna Diefenbaker is interred at Woodlawn Cemetery.

== Legacy ==
In 1982, Diefenbaker became the focus of Simma Holt's book The Other Mrs. Diefenbaker, which traced the ways in which her influence and support had been instrumental in John Diefenbaker's political career. Author Heather Robertson also wrote on her and other spouses of Canadian prime ministers in the 1991 book More Than a Rose.

Although officially named the John and Olive Diefenbaker Museum due to Olive's status as John's wife during his term as prime minister, the Diefenbaker House museum does include materials related to Edna in its exhibits.
