= Diefenbaker Canada Centre =

- Diefenbaker Canada Centre
- Established: 1980
- Location: Saskatoon, Saskatchewan, Canada
- Coordinates: 52.133972°N 106.63991°W
- Type: Prime ministerial museum and archives
- Curator: Teresa Carlson
- Website: diefenbaker.usask.ca

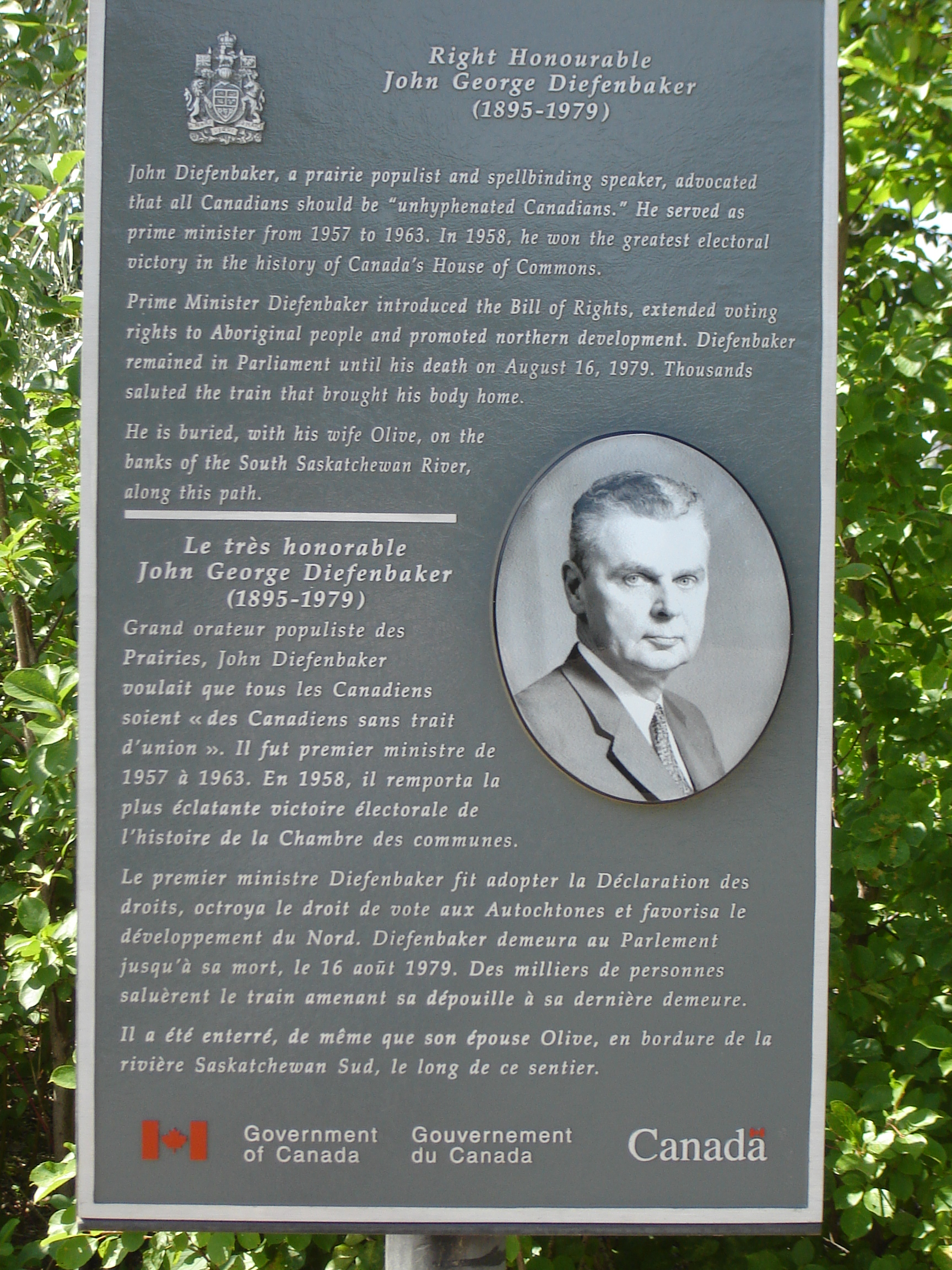
John G. Diefenbaker Plaque

The Right Honourable John G. Diefenbaker Centre for the Study of Canada, popularly known as the Diefenbaker Canada Centre, is a prime ministerial museum and archives located in Saskatoon, honouring Canada's 13th prime minister, the Rt. Hon. John G. Diefenbaker.

Upon his election as chancellor of the University of Saskatchewan in 1969, Diefenbaker approached the university with an offer to donate his estate to the institution, on the condition that a museum and archives be built to house and display his items. Diefenbaker's inspiration in this regard was the Harry S. Truman Presidential Library and Museum in Independence, Missouri, which he had previously visited.

The university accepted Diefenbaker's donation. Construction began on the centre, which opened on June 12, 1980.

The centre's museum contains a permanent display on the life and career of Diefenbaker, highlighted by replica rooms of the Prime Minister's Office and Privy Council Chambers, as they existed on Parliament Hill during his governments from 1957 to 1963.

A portion of the museum is set aside for traveling exhibits related to his career interests. In 1997, one of these exhibitions was the site of a theft when items were stolen from an exhibition of French jewelry.

The Diefenbaker Canada Centre archives contains Diefenbaker's personal and professional papers, photographs, and audio-visual material, including his prime ministerial papers. The papers of Diefenbaker, and those of R.B. Bennett, are the only prime ministerial papers not housed at Library and Archives Canada.

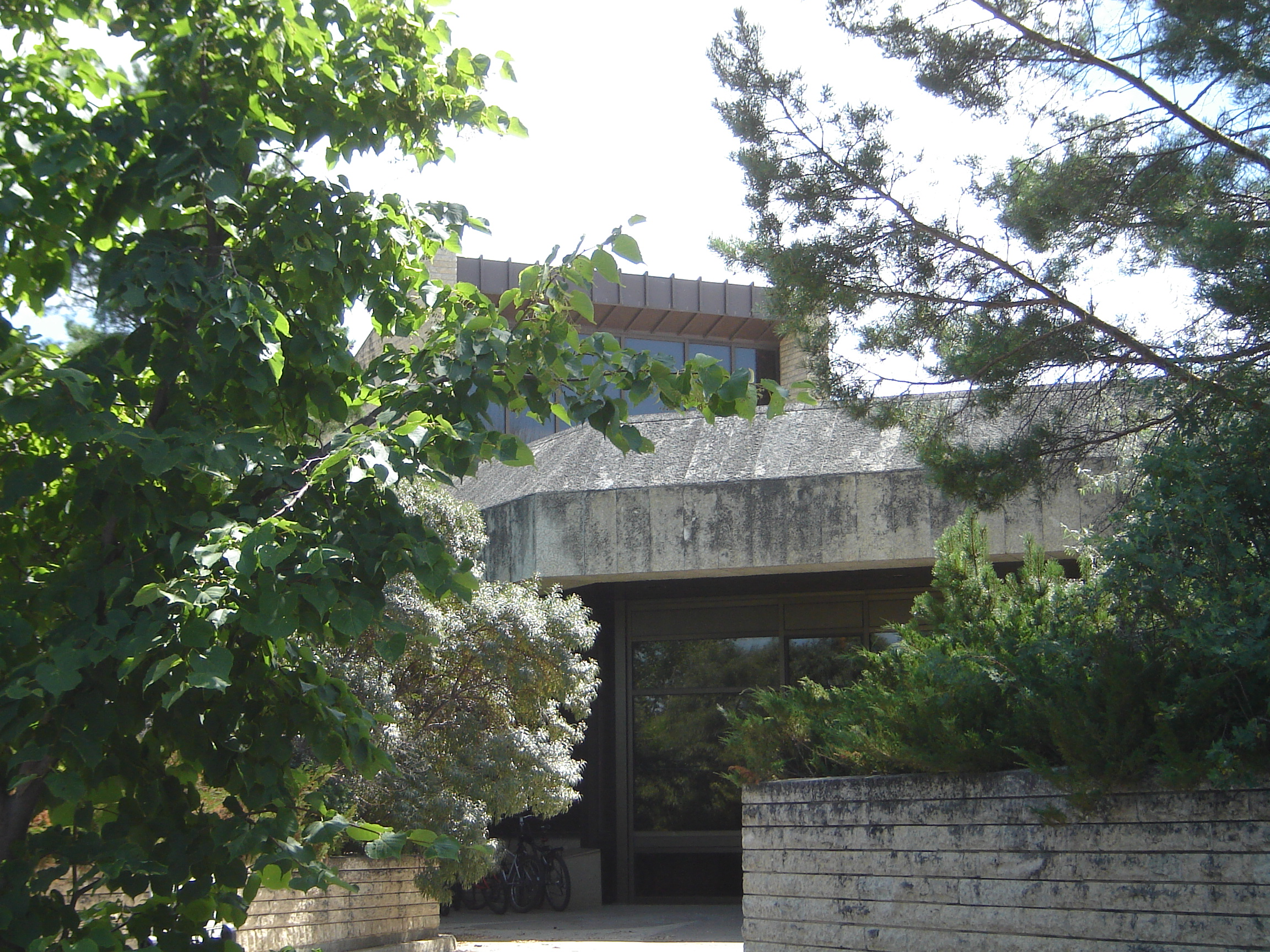
John G. Diefenbaker Centre for the Study of Canada

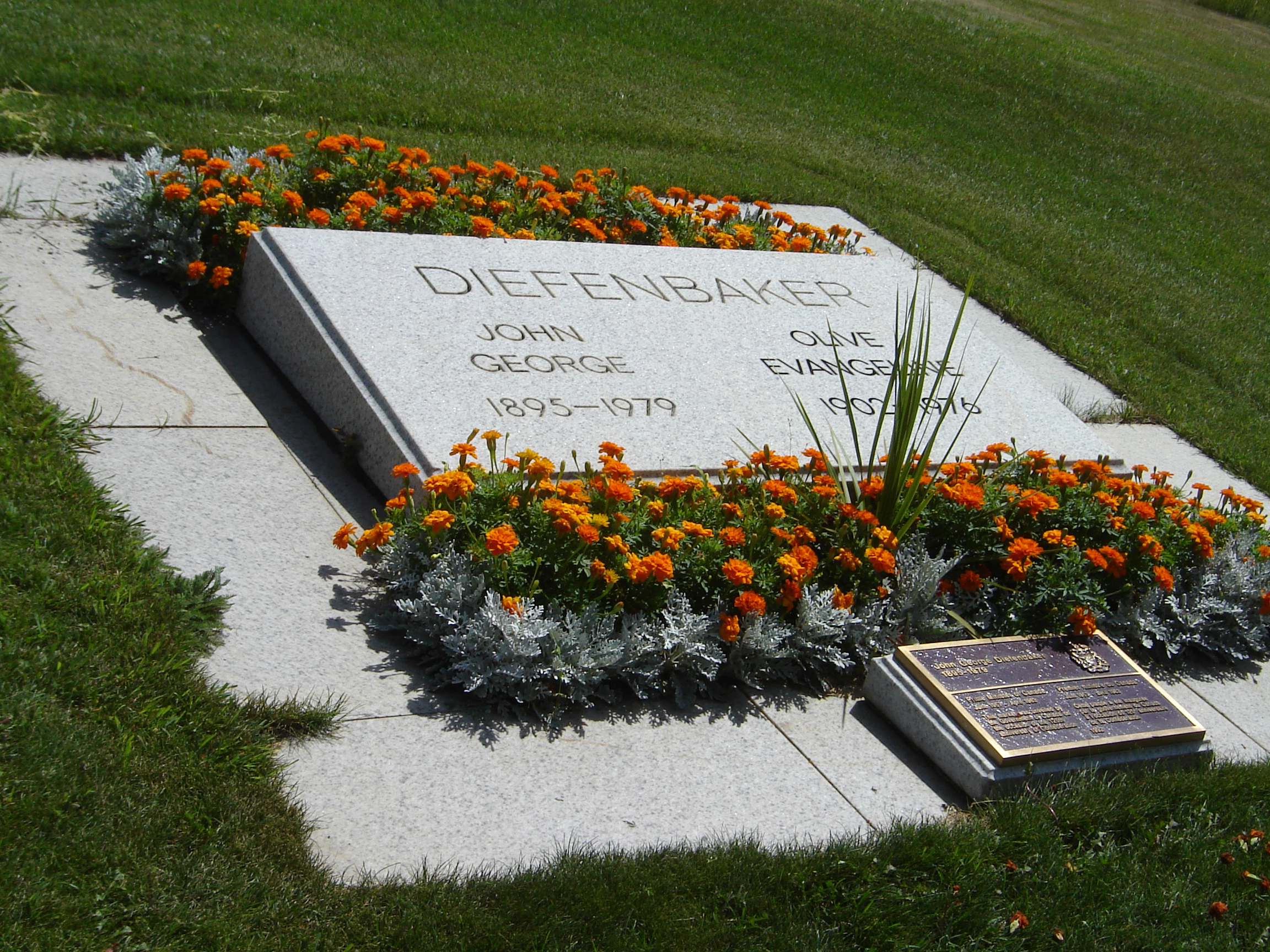
John G. Diefenbaker Centre for the Study of Canada
