= Olive Diefenbaker =

Canadian political spouse (1902–1976)

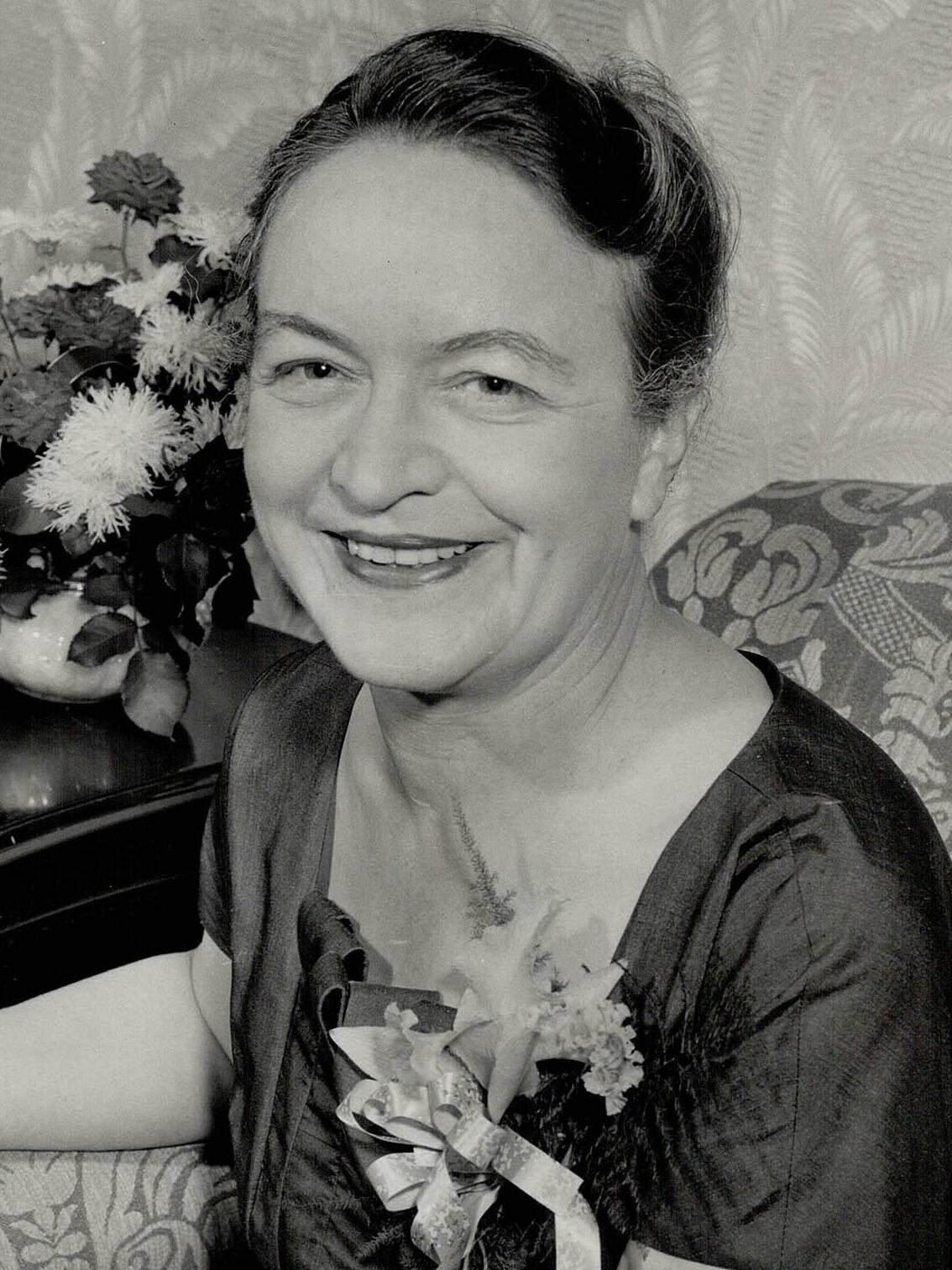
- Diefenbaker in 1957
- Born: Olive Evangeline Freeman; April 14, 1902; Roland, Manitoba, Canada
- Died: December 22, 1976 (aged 74); Ottawa, Ontario, Canada
- Resting place: Saskatoon, Saskatchewan, Canada
- Known for: Spouse of the Prime Minister of Canada
- Spouses: Harry Palmer (m. 1933; died 1936) John Diefenbaker (m. 1953)
- Children: 1

Olive Evangeline Diefenbaker (née Freeman; April 14, 1902 – December 22, 1976) was the second wife of John Diefenbaker, the 13th Prime Minister of Canada. Diefenbaker proposed to her in Paddockwood, Saskatchewan, while she was a school teacher, and they were married on December 8, 1953. They had no children together, but they raised a daughter from her previous marriage to Toronto solicitor Harry Palmer, who died less than three years after the birth of the child. On her husband's death in 1979, her remains, buried in 1976 in Ottawa, were reburied in Saskatoon in 1979.

== Life ==
Olive was born to two Nova Scotian parents. Her father was a Baptist Minister from Canning, Nova Scotia. Due to her father's occupation she grew up moving around the Canadian Prairies. Olive first met her second husband John Diefenbaker in Saskatoon, Saskatchewan at a church where her father was working. John had just gotten back from fighting in World War I and was studying law at this time.

She attended McMaster University and the Ontario College of Education and in 1933 she started her career as a high school teacher. She taught French at the Guelph Collegiate Vocational Institute in Ontario. She wore a steel back brace due to several slipped disks.

She met her first husband Harry Palmer during 1933. He was a Toronto barrister and lawyer. He later died in 1936 after three years of marriage and one child. During her marriage to Harry, she stepped away from her profession but after his untimely death she started a new career as the director of child guidance for the Ontario Department of Education. Olive reunited with John Diefenbaker in 1951 and they married in 1953 in Toronto. Diefenbaker's first wife, Edna Brower, had died in 1951. Olive Freeman was born in 1902 in Roland, Manitoba.

== Political influence ==
Olive Diefenbaker was a known supporter of the suffrage movement. During 1964 she spoke to a group of 600 people belonging to the Progressive Conservative Women's Association about the power of the unification of women in politics. During a visit to the Fraser Valley, Olive addressed a group of her followers about her preference of flats over heels after following her husband's two campaigns. She spoke French and considered her French grammar better than her English grammar, she would even address the French-speaking voters in French.

John considered Olive an asset to his campaign team because of her ability with the voters and remember names. She would write her husband notes during his speeches with advice on how to appeal to the voters, for instance, during 1963 while John was delivering a speech in Cape Breton, Nova Scotia, Olive wrote him a note to mention the painting they had hung over their fireplace back at home which is a landscape of Cape Breton to help appeal to his audience.

Although she was very politically active, she was very humble about her participation and considered her and John to be a strong team. She was well known for her grace when hosting at 24 Sussex Drive.

== Interests ==
Olive had several hobbies including; painting, sewing, leather work and metal work. She also would give items from her closet to local bazaars supporting women's institutes. An example is her white fitted floral hat bought by Mrs Bell Hall, an Ontario Councillor.

== Legacy ==
Olive Diefenbaker Drive in Prince Albert, Saskatchewan is named in her honour.

== See also ==
- Spouse of the prime minister of Canada
