= Electoral history of John Diefenbaker =

List of elections featuring John Diefenbaker as a candidate

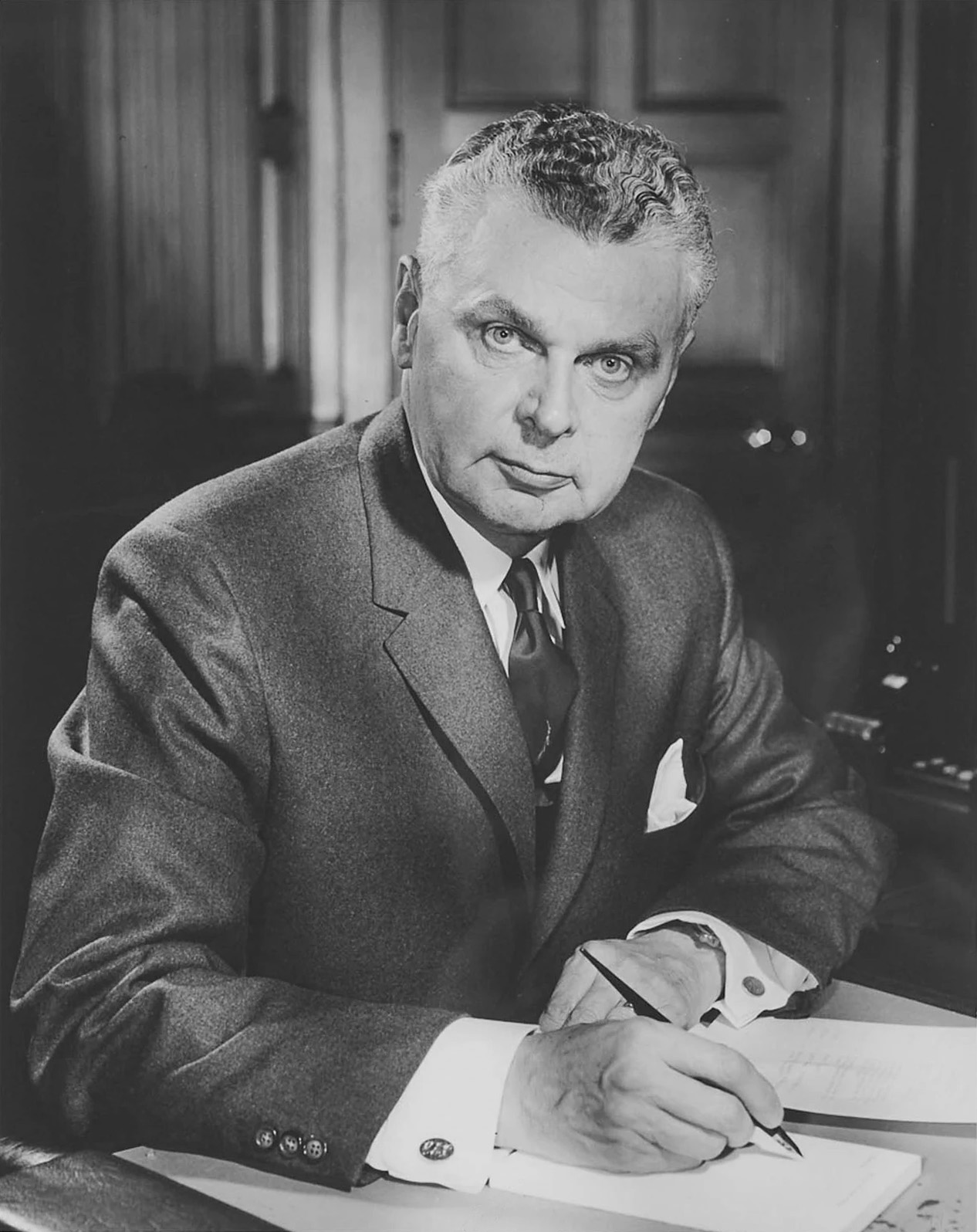
John Diefenbaker in 1957.

This article is the Electoral history of John Diefenbaker, the thirteenth Prime Minister of Canada.

A Progressive Conservative, he served one term as prime minister (1957–1963), defeating Louis St. Laurent. He won three general elections (1957, 1958 and 1962), with one majority government and two minority governments. He lost the 1963 election to Lester Pearson, who succeeded him as prime minister. Diefenbaker led the party one last time in the 1965 election, but was again defeated by Pearson.

He stood for election to the House of Commons of Canada fifteen times. He was defeated in his first two attempts (1925, 1926), but he was elected on his third try, in 1940. Thereafter, he was elected an additional twelve times, until he died in office in 1979.

Diefenbaker sought the leadership of the Progressive Conservative Party three times, unsuccessfully in 1942 and 1948, before winning it in 1957. Following the loss in the election in 1965, the party held a leadership convention in 1967 which he lost, ending his leadership of the Progressive Conservative party. Robert Stanfield succeeded him as party leader.

Prior to election to the House of Commons, Diefenbaker was also involved in Saskatchewan provincial politics and municipal politics, but with little success.

== Summary ==
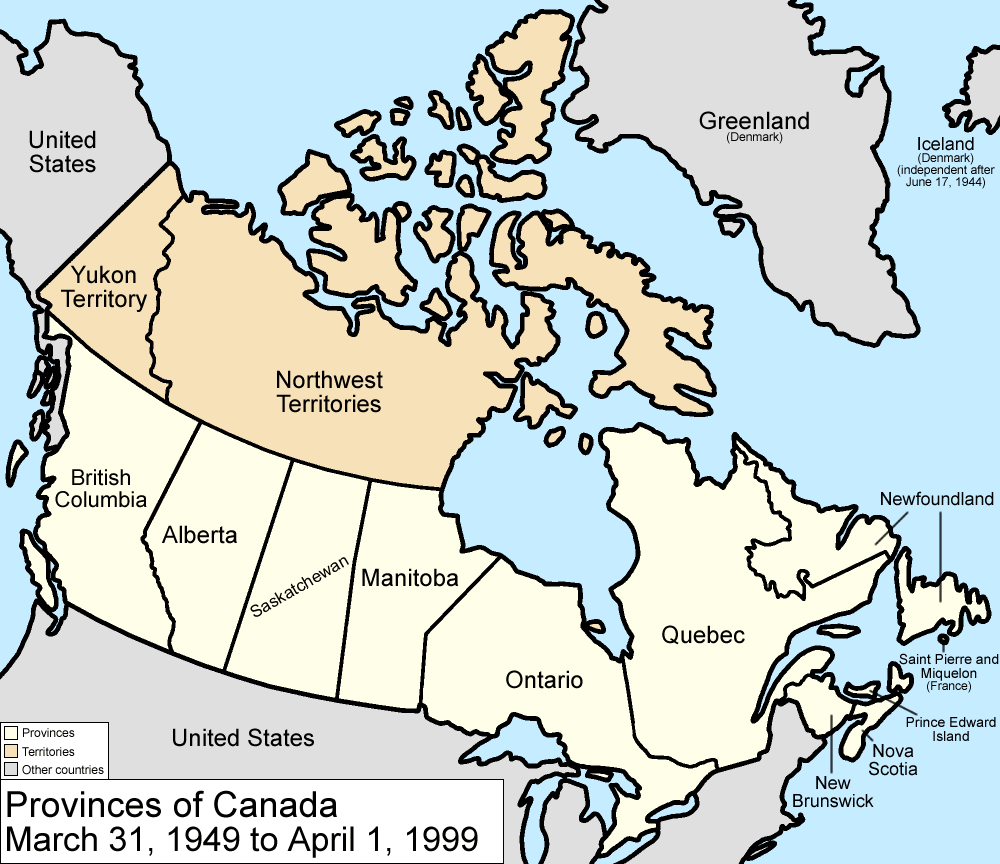
Canada had ten provinces and two territories throughout Diefenbaker's time as Prime Minister.

Diefenbaker ranks tenth out of twenty-three prime ministers for time in office, serving one term of five years and 305 days.

Diefenbaker is the only prime minister from Saskatchewan.

In 1920, Diefenbaker began his political career, starting with municipal politics. At age 25, he was elected to the village council of Wakaw, Saskatchewan, where he operated his first law practice.

Diefenbaker would not win another election for twenty years. In the intervening two decades, he lost five elections: two at the federal level, two at the provincial level, and one at the municipal level. It was not until 1940 that he finally won his second election, to the House of Commons. From that point on, he never lost an election at the constituency level, winning thirteen straight elections to the Commons. Diefenbaker eventually died in office as a Member of Parliament.

At the federal level, Diefenbaker stood for election in the general elections of 1925 and 1926, but was defeated both times. In the 1926 election, his Liberal opponent was the former prime minister, William Lyon Mackenzie King. This is the only time two future prime ministers have directly opposed each other in the same riding. After his election loss, Diefenbaker was a delegate to the 1927 Conservative convention which chose R.B. Bennett as leader of the party. He also campaigned for the party in the 1935 election.

Diefenbaker was also very active, but unsuccessful, in provincial politics. He stood for election in the provincial election of 1929, but was defeated. In 1933 he was elected vice-president of the Saskatchewan Conservative Party. After the Conservatives were wiped out in the provincial election of 1934, he became the acting president of the party. In 1936, at the leadership convention, he was acclaimed as the leader of the party. He led the party in the provincial election of 1938, running in the constituency of Arm River, but he and the party were both defeated. No Conservatives were elected to the Legislative Assembly and the party earned only 12% of the provincial popular vote. At the subsequent party convention four months after the election, Diefenbaker offered his resignation but it was refused. The Conservatives were so decimated by the previous two elections that they had few members or supporters. He remained leader of the party for the next two years.

In 1933, he ran for the mayor of Prince Albert, Saskatchewan, but was defeated by 48 votes.

In 1940, Diefenbaker was elected to the House of Commons, for the riding of Lake Centre. Entering the Commons, he soon showed his leadership aspirations beginning with the Progressive Conservative leadership convention of 1942. Although unsuccessful, he tried again in 1948 and 1956. In 1942 he came in third; in 1948 he came in second; and in 1956 he won the leadership. He would hold the leadership for eleven years, eventually being forced out at the 1967 convention, after the two losses in the general elections of 1963 and 1965.

Diefenbaker was elected to the Commons thirteen times (1940, 1945, 1949, 1953, 1957, 1958, 1962, 1963, 1965, 1968, 1972, 1974, and 1979), from 1940 until his death shortly after the election of 1979. For eight straight elections (1957, 1958, 1962, 1963, 1965, 1972, and 1974), he won majorities even in multi-candidate races. In four of those contests, he won majorities of over 65% (72.1% in 1958, 70.8% in 1962, 71.4% in 1963, and 65.5% in 1965).

He served in the House of Commons for a total of 39 years, 4 months, and 21 days.

== Federal general elections: 1957 to 1965 ==
Diefenbaker led the Progressive Conservatives in five general elections. He was successful in the general elections of 1957, 1958, and 1962, but was defeated in the elections of 1963 and 1965.

=== Federal election, 1957 ===
Diefenbaker led the Progressive Conservatives in the general election of 1957. The election resulted in a minority government, with no party having a majority. Although the Liberals came in first in the popular vote, they came in second in seats in the House of Commons, behind Diefenbaker and the Progressive Conservatives. St. Laurent resigned and Diefenbaker formed a minority government, ending twenty-three years of Liberal rule.

Canadian Federal Election, 1957 - Parties, Leaders, Seats Won and Popular Vote
Party	Leaders	Seats Won	Popular Vote
Progressive Conservative	John Diefenbaker^{1}	112	38.5%
Liberal	Louis St. Laurent^{2}	105	40.5%
Co-operative Commonwealth Federation	Major James Coldwell	25	10.6%
Social Credit	Solon Earl Low	19	6.5%
Others	–	4	1.0%
Spoiled ballots	–	–	1.1%
Total		265	96.8%^{3}
Sources: Library of Parliament – History of Federal Ridings since 1867

^{1} Leader of the Opposition when election was called; Prime Minister after election.
^{2} Prime Minister when election was called; Leader of the Opposition after the election.
^{3} Table does not include parties which received votes but did not elect any members.

=== Federal election, 1958 ===
A year after winning the 1957 election, Diefenbaker led the Progressive Conservatives in the general election of 1958. He won the biggest seat majority in Canadian history up to that time, 208 seats in a House of Commons with 265 seats. Diefenbaker formed a majority government, with a 151-seat majority over the other three parties combined.

Canadian Federal Election, 1958 - Parties, Leaders, Seats Won and Popular Vote
Party	Leaders	Seats Won	Popular Vote
Progressive Conservative	John Diefenbaker^{1}	208	53.7%
Liberal	Lester B. Pearson^{2}	48	33.4%
Co-operative Commonwealth Federation	Major James Coldwell	8	9.5%
Liberal–Labour	–	1	0.2%
Total		265	98.2%^{3}
Sources: Library of Parliament – History of Federal Ridings since 1867

^{1} Prime Minister when election was called; Prime Minister after election.
^{2} Leader of the Opposition when election was called; Leader of the Opposition after the election.
^{3} Table does not include parties which received votes but did not elect any members.

=== Federal election, 1962 ===
After four years of majority government, Diefenbaker again led the Progressive Conservatives to the polls, but lost almost one hundred seats and was reduced to a minority government.

Canadian Federal Election, 1962 - Parties, Leaders, Seats Won and Popular Vote
Party	Leaders	Seats Won	Popular Vote
Progressive Conservative	John Diefenbaker^{1}	116	37.2%
Liberal	Lester B. Pearson^{2}	99	37.0%
Social Credit	Robert N. Thompson	30	11.6%
New Democratic Party	Tommy Douglas	19	13.6%
Liberal–Labour	–	1	0.2%
Total		265	99.6%^{3}
Sources: Library of Parliament – History of Federal Ridings since 1867

^{1} Prime Minister when election was called; Prime Minister after election.
^{2} Leader of the Opposition when election was called; Leader of the Opposition after the election.
^{3} Table does not include parties which received votes but did not elect any members.

=== Federal election, 1963 ===
Diefenbaker's minority government following the 1962 election lasted less than a year. His government was defeated on a motion of non-confidence in February, 1963, which resulted in the dissolution of Parliament and a general election. Lester Pearson and the Liberals won the election, but fell five seats short of a majority. Pearson become prime minister of a minority government, and Diefenbaker became Leader of the Opposition.

Canadian Federal Election, 1963 - Parties, Leaders, Seats Won and Popular Vote
Party	Leaders	Seats Won	Popular Vote
Liberal	Lester B. Pearson^{1}	128	41.5%
Progressive Conservative	John Diefenbaker^{2}	95	32.8%
Social Credit	Robert N. Thompson	24	11.9%
New Democratic Party	Tommy Douglas	17	13.2%
Liberal–Labour	–	1	0.2%
Total		265	99.6%^{3}
Sources: Library of Parliament – History of Federal Ridings since 1867

^{1} Leader of the Opposition when election was called; Prime Minister after election.
^{2} Prime Minister when election was called; Leader of the Opposition after the election.
^{3} Table does not include parties which received votes but did not elect any members.

=== Federal election, 1965 ===
After two years of minority government, Pearson and the Liberals called an election. The result was another hung parliament. The Liberals increased their seat total, but again fell short of an outright majority, this time by two seats. Pearson governed as a minority government. Diefenbaker initially continued as leader of the Opposition, but in 1966 he was ousted by a party revolt. Robert Stanfield succeeded him as party leader.

Canadian Federal Election, 1965 - Parties, Leaders, Seats Won and Popular Vote
Party	Leaders	Seats Won	Popular Vote
Liberal	Lester B. Pearson^{1}	131	40.2%
Progressive Conservative	John Diefenbaker^{2}	97	32.4%
New Democratic Party	Tommy Douglas	21	17.9%
Ralliement créditiste	Réal Caouette	9	4.7%
Social Credit	Robert N. Thompson	5	3.7%
Independent	–	1	0.7%
Independent PC	–	1	0.2%
Total		265	99.8%^{3}
Sources: Library of Parliament – History of Federal Ridings since 1867

^{1} Prime Minister when election was called; Prime Minister after election.
^{2} Leader of the Opposition when election was called; Leader of the Opposition after the election.
^{3} Table does not include parties which received votes but did not elect any members.

== Federal constituency elections: 1925, 1926, 1940 to 1979 ==
Diefenbaker stood for election to the House of Commons fifteen times. He was defeated in his first two attempts, but elected in 1940 onwards.

=== 1925 Federal Election: Prince Albert ===
Federal Election, 1925: Prince Albert, Saskatchewan
Party	Candidate	Popular Vote	%
Liberal	Yes Charles M. McDonald	5,301	51.2%
Progressive	X Andrew Knox	2,638	25.5%
Conservative	John Diefenbaker	2,412	23.3%
Total		10,351	100.0%
Source: Library of Parliament – History of Federal Ridings since 1867: Prince Albert

Yes Elected.
X Incumbent.

=== 1926 Federal election: Prince Albert ===
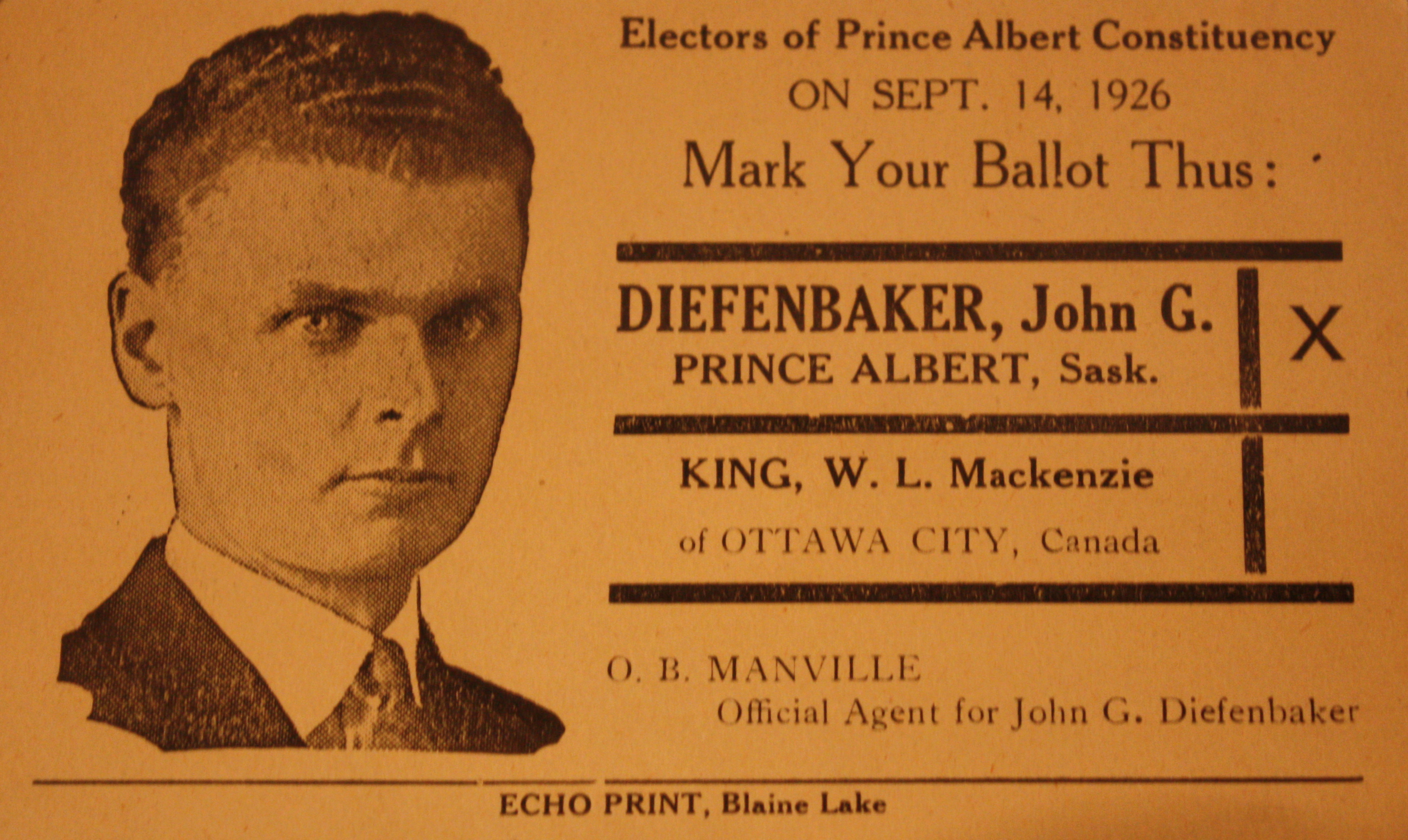
Diefenbaker campaign poster in the 1926 election.

In the 1926 general election, Diefenbaker's opponent in Prince Albert riding was Mackenzie King. This is the only occasion where two future prime ministers have run directly against each other in the same riding.

Federal Election, 1926: Prince Albert, Saskatchewan
Party	Candidate	Popular Vote	%
Liberal	Yes X William Lyon Mackenzie King	8,933	64.9%
Conservative	John Diefenbaker	4,838	35.1%
Total		13,771	100.0%
Source: Library of Parliament – History of Federal Ridings since 1867: Prince Albert

Yes Elected.
X Incumbent.

=== 1940 Federal election: Lake Centre ===
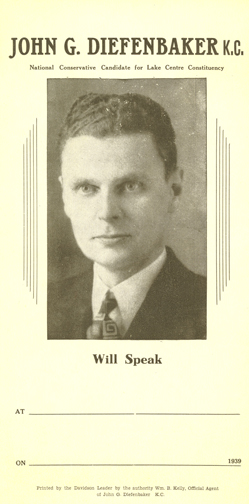
Diefenbaker campaign poster in the 1940 election.

Federal Election, 1940: Lake Centre, Saskatchewan
Party	Candidate	Popular Vote	%
National Government	Yes John Diefenbaker	5,974	36.3%
Liberal	X John Frederick Johnston	5,694	34.6%
Co-operative Commonwealth Federation	William Russell Fansher	4,793	29.1%
Total		16,461	100.0%
Source: Library of Parliament – History of Federal Ridings since 1867: Lake Centre

Yes Elected.
X Incumbent.

=== 1945 Federal election: Lake Centre ===
Federal Election, 1945: Lake Centre, Saskatchewan
Party	Candidate	Popular Vote	%
Progressive Conservative	Yes X John Diefenbaker	6,884	41.5%
Co-operative Commonwealth Federation	Leslie John Bright	5,413	35.5%
Liberal	Frank Campbell Latta	3,812	23.0%
Total		16,571	100.0%
Source: Library of Parliament – History of Federal Ridings since 1867: Lake Centre

Yes Elected.
X Incumbent.

=== 1949 Federal election: Lake Centre ===
Federal Election, 1949: Lake Centre, Saskatchewan
Party	Candidate	Popular Vote	%
Progressive Conservative	Yes X John Diefenbaker	8,845	48.7%
Co-operative Commonwealth Federation	Delmar Storey Valleau	5,413	29.8%
Liberal	Donald Arthur MacRae	3,061	16.8%
Social Credit	Joshua Norman Haldeman	856	4.7%
Total		18,175	100.0%
Source: Library of Parliament – History of Federal Ridings since 1867: Lake Centre

Yes Elected.
X Incumbent.

=== 1953 Federal election: Prince Albert ===
Federal Election, 1953: Prince Albert, Saskatchewan
Party	Candidate	Popular Vote	%
Progressive Conservative	Yes John Diefenbaker	10,038	44.1%
Co-operative Commonwealth Federation	David Frederick Corney	7,037	30.9%
Liberal	Floyd Robert Glass	5,409	23.7%
Labor–Progressive	Phyllis Clarke	295	1.3%
Total		22,779	100.0%
Source: Library of Parliament – History of Federal Ridings since 1867: Prince Albert

Yes Elected.

=== 1957 Federal election: Prince Albert ===
Federal Election, 1957: Prince Albert, Saskatchewan
Party	Candidate	Popular Vote	%
Progressive Conservative	Yes X John Diefenbaker	12,349	53.1%
Co-operative Commonwealth Federation	Robert Nathaniel Gooding	5,795	24.9%
Liberal	Russell Ernest Partridge	5,119	22.0%
Total		23,263	100.0%
Source: Library of Parliament – History of Federal Ridings since 1867: Prince Albert

Yes Elected.
X Incumbent.

=== 1958 Federal election: Prince Albert ===
Federal Election, 1958: Prince Albert, Saskatchewan
Party	Candidate	Popular Vote	%
Progressive Conservative	Yes X John Diefenbaker	16,583	72.1%
Co-operative Commonwealth Federation	Thora Elizabeth Wiggens	3,870	16.8%
Liberal	Ernie Unruh	2,538	11.0%
Total		22,991	99.9%^{1}
Source: Library of Parliament – History of Federal Ridings since 1867: Prince Albert

Yes Elected.
X Incumbent.
^{1} Rounding error.

=== 1962 Federal election: Prince Albert ===
Federal Election, 1962: Prince Albert, Saskatchewan
Party	Candidate	Popular Vote	%
Progressive Conservative	Yes X John Diefenbaker	18,276	70.8%
Co-operative Commonwealth Federation	Roger Carter	4,173	16.2%
Liberal	George William Newell	2,745	10.6%
Social Credit	Ken Solheim	627	2.4%
Total		25,821	100.0%
Source: Library of Parliament – History of Federal Ridings since 1867: Prince Albert

Yes Elected.
X Incumbent.

=== 1963 Federal election: Prince Albert ===
Federal Election, 1963: Prince Albert, Saskatchewan
Party	Candidate	Popular Vote	%
Progressive Conservative	Yes X John Diefenbaker	17,824	71.4%
New Democratic Party	Henry Merrifield Apps	3,373	13.5%
Liberal	Harold John Fraser	3,206	12.8%
Social Credit	Ken Solheim	565	2.3%
Total		24,968	100.0%
Source: Library of Parliament – History of Federal Ridings since 1867: Prince Albert

Yes Elected.
X Incumbent.

=== 1965 Federal election: Prince Albert ===
Federal Election, 1965: Prince Albert, Saskatchewan
Party	Candidate	Popular Vote	%
Progressive Conservative	Yes X John Diefenbaker	15,635	65.5%
New Democratic Party	Peter Kachur	4,227	17.7%
Liberal	Lenore Ramsland Andrews	3,453	14.5%
Social Credit	John Dashchuk	565	2.4%
Total		23,880	100.1%^{1}
Source: Library of Parliament – History of Federal Ridings since 1867: Prince Albert

Yes Elected.
X Incumbent.
^{1} Rounding error.

=== 1968 Federal election: Prince Albert ===
Federal Election, 1968: Prince Albert, Saskatchewan
Party	Candidate	Popular Vote	%
Progressive Conservative	Yes X John Diefenbaker	17,850	56.0%
New Democratic Party	Al Hartley	8,979	28.2%
Liberal	Philip Edward West	5,025	15.8%
Total		31,854	100.0%
Source: Library of Parliament – History of Federal Ridings since 1867: Prince Albert

Yes Elected.
X Incumbent.

=== 1972 Federal election: Prince Albert ===
Federal Election, 1972: Prince Albert, Saskatchewan
Party	Candidate	Popular Vote	%
Progressive Conservative	Yes X John Diefenbaker	19,410	59.5%
New Democratic Party	William John Berezowsky	9,115	27.9%
Liberal	Leo F. Pinel	3,613	11.1%
Social Credit	Claude Campagna	421	1.3%
Independent	Bill Fair	61	0.2%
Total		32,620	100.0%
Source: Library of Parliament – History of Federal Ridings since 1867: Prince Albert

Yes Elected.
X Incumbent.

=== 1974 Federal election: Prince Albert ===
Federal Election, 1974: Prince Albert, Saskatchewan
Party	Candidate	Popular Vote	%
Progressive Conservative	Yes X John Diefenbaker	17,787	59.1%
New Democratic Party	Thora Elizabeth Wiggens	6,496	21.6%
Liberal	Philip Edward West	5,426	18.0%
Social Credit	Joseph Gerrard Cools	366	1.2%
Total		30,075	100.0%
Source: Library of Parliament – History of Federal Ridings since 1867: Prince Albert

Yes Elected.
X Incumbent.

=== 1979 Federal election: Prince Albert ===
Federal Election, 1979: Prince Albert, Saskatchewan
Party	Candidate	Popular Vote	%
Progressive Conservative	Yes X John Diefenbaker	16,438	49.0%
New Democratic Party	Stanley J. Hovdebo	11,979	35.7%
Liberal	Peter Abrametz	5,158	15.4%
Total		33,575	100.1%^{1}
Source: Library of Parliament – History of Federal Ridings since 1867: Prince Albert

Yes Elected.
X Incumbent.
^{1} Rounding error.

== Saskatchewan general election: 1938 ==
Diefenbaker led the Saskatchewan Conservative Party in the general election of 1938. The Conservatives did not win a single seat and only won 12% of the popular vote. Diefenbaker was defeated in his own attempt to win the constituency of Arm River.

Saskatchewan General Election 1938 - Parties, Leaders, Seats Won and Popular Vote
Party	Leaders	Seats Won	Popular Vote	Popular Vote Percentage
Liberal	William John Patterson^{1}	38	200,334	45.5%
Co-operative Commonwealth Federation	George Hara Williams^{1}	10	82,529	18.7%
Social Credit	Joseph Needham	2	70,084	15.9%
Unity	–	2	9,848	2.2%
Conservative	John Diefenbaker	0	52,315	11.9%
Independent Labour	–	0	12,039	2.7%
Labour Progressive	–	0	8,514	1.9%
Independent	–	0	4,023	0.9%
Independent Conservative	–	0	828	0.2%
Independent Social Credit	–	0	228	0.1%
Total		52	440,742	100.0%
Source: Elections Saskatchewan - Election results - 1938

^{1} Premier when election was called; Premier after election.
^{2} Leader of the Opposition when election was called; Leader of the Opposition after election.

== Saskatchewan constituency elections: 1929, 1938 ==
Diefenbaker twice stood for election to the Legislative Assembly of Saskatchewan. He was defeated in both elections.

=== 1929 Saskatchewan Election: Prince Albert ===
Saskatchewan Election, 1929: Prince Albert
Party	Candidate	Popular Vote	%
Liberal	Yes X Thomas Clayton Davis	3,578	53.1%
Conservative	John Diefenbaker	3,163	46.9%
Total		6,741	100.0%
Source: Saskatchewan Archives - Executive and Legislative Directory - Election Results by Electoral Division

Yes Elected.
X Incumbent.

=== 1938 Saskatchewan Election: Arm River ===
Saskatchewan Election, 1938: Arm River
Party	Candidate	Popular Vote	%
Liberal	Yes X Gustaf Herman Danielson	3,295	51.5%
Conservative	John Diefenbaker	3,105	48.5%
Total		6,400	100.0%
Source: Saskatchewan Archives - Executive and Legislative Directory - Election Results by Electoral Division

Yes Elected.
X Incumbent.

== Municipal politics ==
=== Village of Wakaw ===
In 1920, Diefenbaker was elected to a three-year term on the village council of Wakaw, where he had established his first law practice. He was 24 years old.

=== City of Prince Albert ===
In 1933, Diefenbaker was a late entrant in the election for mayor of Prince Albert. He lost by 48 votes. His successful opponent was Harold John Fraser, who thirty years later ran against Diefenbaker in the Prince Albert riding in the 1963 federal election.

Mayoral Election, November 27, 1933, Prince Albert, Saskatchewan
Party	Candidate	Popular Vote	%
Liberal	Yes X Harold John Fraser	1,069	51.4%
Conservative	John Diefenbaker	1,019	48.6%
Total		2,078	100.0%
Source: "Fraser defeats Diefenbaker", The Leader Post, November 28, 1933, p. 1

Yes Elected.
X Incumbent.

== Progressive Conservative Party Leadership Conventions: 1942 to 1967 ==
Diefenbaker tried twice unsuccessfully to be elected leader of the Progressive Conservative Party, being defeated in 1942 and 1948, before winning the leadership in 1956. He was challenged for the leadership eleven years later, in 1967 and was defeated. Robert Stanfield was elected the party leader.

=== 1942 Leadership Convention ===
Just two years after being elected to the House of Commons, Diefenbaker ran for the leadership of the Progressive Conservative Party, coming in third in a field of five candidates. John Bracken was elected leader.

Progressive Conservative Leadership Convention, December 11, 1942 Voting results by ballot
Candidate	First Ballot		Second Ballot	
Candidate	Votes cast	%	Votes cast	%
John Bracken	420	48.3%	538	61.7%
Murdoch Alexander MacPherson	222	25.5%	255	29.2%
John Diefenbaker	120	13.8%	79	9.1%
Howard Charles Green	88; Withdrew after first ballot.	10.1%	–	–
Henry Herbert Stevens	20; Withdrew after first ballot.	2.3%	–	–
Total	870	100.0%	872	100.0%
Source: CPAC – 1942 Conservative Leadership Convention

=== 1948 Leadership Convention ===
Bracken resigned as party leader in 1948, leading to a second leadership convention in only six years. Diefenbaker again contested the leadership, this time coming in second, after the winner, George Drew.

Progressive Conservative Leadership Convention, October 2, 1948 Voting results by ballot
Candidate	First Ballot	
Candidate	Votes cast	%
George A. Drew	827	66.6%
John Diefenbaker	311	25.0%
Donald Fleming	104	8.4%
Total	1,284	100.0%
Source: CPAC – 1948 Progressive Conservative Leadership Convention

=== 1956 Leadership Convention ===
Drew resigned due to ill health. In his third leadership contest, Diefenbaker won.

Progressive Conservative Leadership Convention, December 14, 1956 Voting results by ballot
Candidate	First Ballot	
Candidate	Votes cast	%
John Diefenbaker	774	60.3%
Donald Fleming	393	30.6%
Davie Fulton	117	9.1%
Total	1,284	100.0%
Source: CPAC – 1948 Progressive Conservative Leadership Convention

=== 1967 Leadership Convention ===
After losing the general elections in 1963 and 1965, Diefenbaker was forced out of the leadership by a vote of the party organization and a leadership convention was called. Diefenbaker decided to contest the leadership and was a late entrant to the convention. He withdrew after coming in fifth on the third ballot.

Progressive Conservative Leadership Convention, September 9, 1967 Voting results by ballot Table 1: Results of First, Second and Third Ballots (For results of Fourth and Fifth Ballots, see Table 2 below)
Candidate	First Ballot		Second Ballot		Third Ballot	
Candidate	Votes cast	%	Votes cast	%	Votes cast	%
Robert Lorne Stanfield	519	23.3%	613	27.7%	717	32.7%
Dufferin Roblin	347	15.6%	430	19.4%	541	24.7%
Davie Fulton	343	15.4%	346	15.6%	361	16.5%
George Hees	295	13.2%	299	13.5%	277; Withdrew after third ballot.	12.6%
John Diefenbaker	271	12.1%	172	7.8%	114; Withdrew after third ballot.	5.2%
Alvin Hamilton	136	6.1%	127	5.7%	106	4.8%
Donald Fleming	126	5.6%	115	5.2%	76; Eliminated after third ballot.	3.5%
Malcolm Wallace McCutcheon	137	6.1%	76; Withdrew after second ballot.	3.4%	–	–
Michael Starr	45	2.0%	34; Eliminated after second ballot.	1.5%	–	–
John MacLean	10; Withdrew after first ballot.	0.4%	–	–	–	–
Mary Walker-Sawka	2 Eliminated after first ballot.	0.1%	–	–	–	–
Total	2,231	99.9%^{1}	2,212	99.8%^{1}	2,192	100.0%
Source: CPAC – 1967 Progressive Conservative Leadership Convention

^{1} Rounding error.

Progressive Conservative Leadership Convention, September 9, 1967 Voting results by ballot Table 2: Results of Fourth and Fifth Ballots (For results of First, Second and Third Ballots, see Table 1 above)
Candidate	Fourth Ballot		Fifth Ballot	
Candidate	Votes cast	%	Votes cast	%
Robert Lorne Stanfield	865	40.2%	1,150	54.3%
Dufferin Roblin	771	35.7%	969	45.7%
Davie Fulton	357; Withdrew after fourth ballot.	16.5%	–	–
Alvin Hamilton	167; Eliminated after fourth ballot.	7.7%	–	–
Total	2,160	100.1^{1}	2,119	100.0%
Source: CPAC – 1967 Progressive Conservative Leadership Convention

== See also ==
- Electoral history of Louis St. Laurent – Diefenbaker's predecessor as prime minister.
- Electoral history of Lester B. Pearson – Diefenbaker's successor as prime minister and principal opponent in four general elections.

== Bibliography ==
- Provincial Elections in Saskatchewan 1905-1986 (Chief Electoral Officer, Province of Saskatchewan).
