= Electoral history of Lester B. Pearson =

List of elections featuring Lester B. Pearson as a candidate

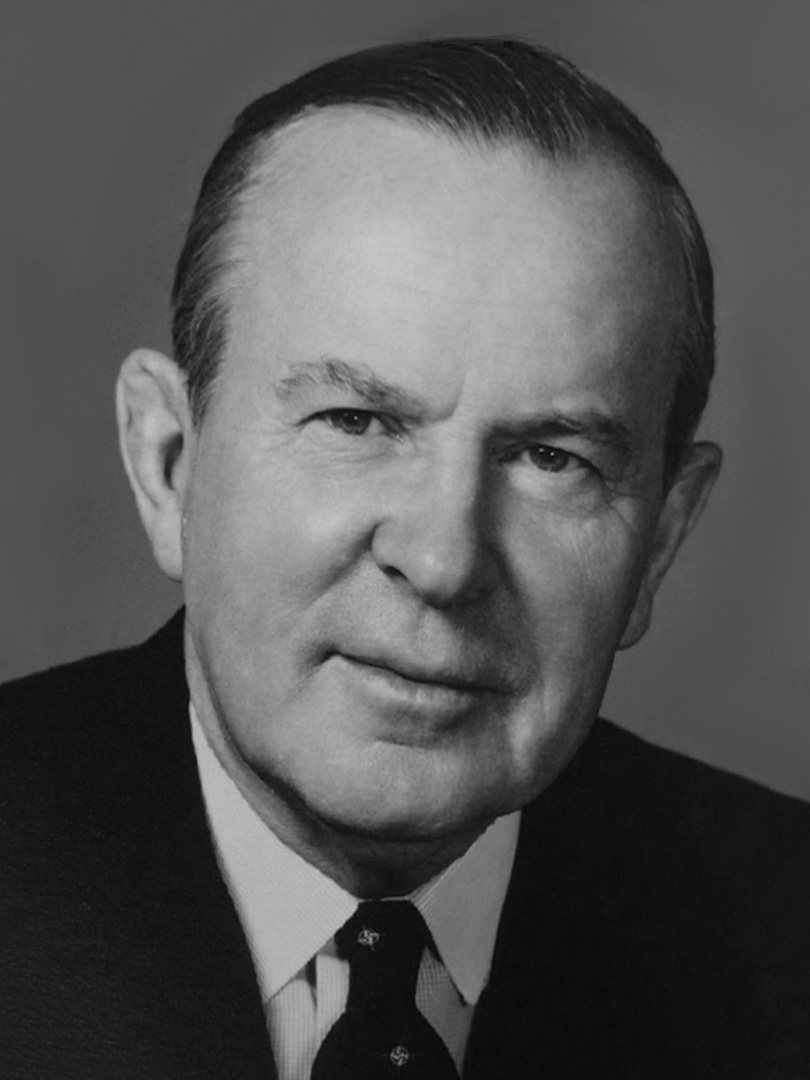
Lester B. Pearson in 1963.

This article is the Electoral history of Lester B. Pearson, the fourteenth Prime Minister of Canada.

A Liberal, he served one term as prime minister (1963–1968). He led the Liberal Party in four general elections, losing two (1958 and 1962) to John Diefenbaker, and winning two (1963 and 1965), defeating Diefenbaker both times. Both victories resulted in hung parliaments and he formed two minority governments. He retired in 1968 and was succeeded by Pierre Trudeau.

Pearson stood for election to the House of Commons of Canada eight times, all for the riding of Algoma East in northern Ontario. He was elected each time.

== Summary ==
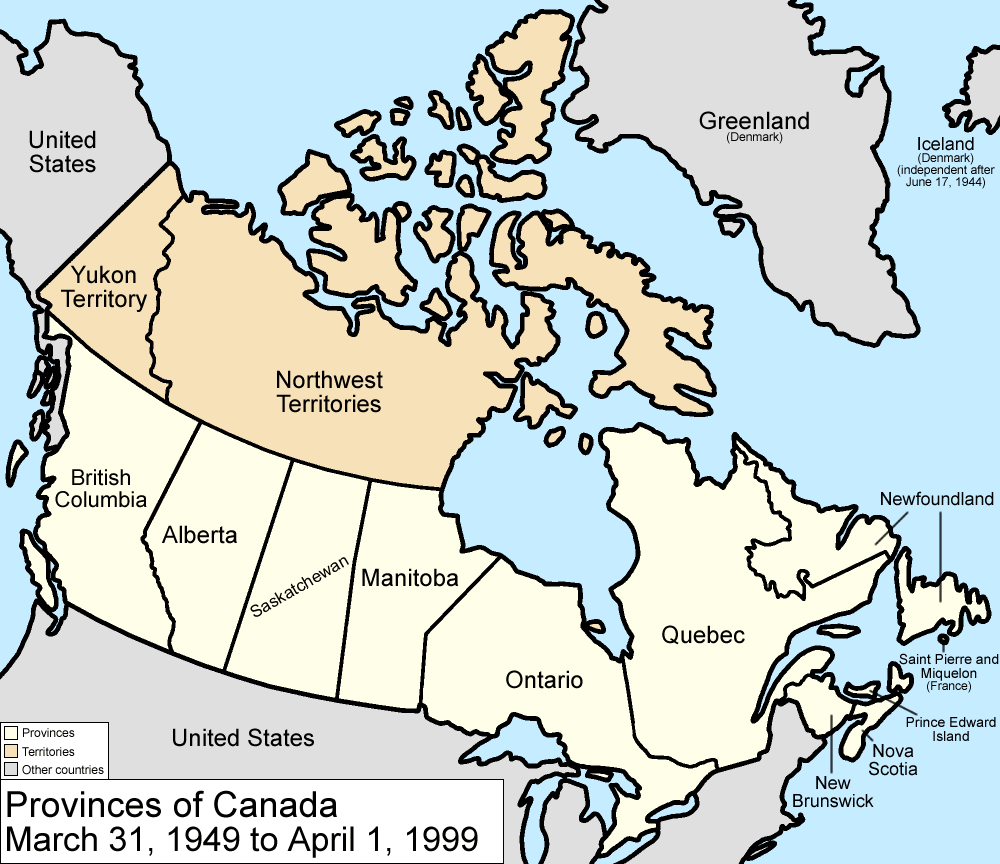
Canada had ten provinces and two territories throughout Pearson's time as Prime Minister.

Pearson ranks twelfth out of twenty-three prime ministers for time in office, serving one term of four years and 364 days.

Pearson was the fifth of five prime ministers from Ontario, the others being Sir John A. Macdonald, Alexander Mackenzie, Sir Mackenzie Bowell, and William Lyon Mackenzie King.

Before entering politics, Pearson was a career diplomat in the Department of External Affairs, including being the Canadian Ambassador to the United States. Prime Minister Mackenzie King invited Pearson several times to join King's government, an invitation Pearson finally accepted in 1948, at the end of King's time in office. King appointed him Minister of External Affairs and Pearson entered Parliament shortly afterwards by a by-election in the northern Ontario riding of Algoma East.

Pearson served in the government of Louis St. Laurent as Minister of External Affairs from 1948 to 1957. Following the defeat of the Liberals in the 1957 general election, Pearson succeeded St. Laurent as leader of the Liberal Party of Canada, becoming Leader of the Opposition in 1958. He was unsuccessful in the first two general elections he contested as leader (1958, 1962), with Diefenbaker continuing in office, but in the general election of 1963 he won a minority government, defeating Diefenbaker. Pearson was returned to office in the 1965 election, again defeating Diefenbaker, again with a minority government.

Pearson stood for election to the House of Commons eight times and was elected in all eight elections (1948 (by-election), 1949, 1953, 1957, 1958, 1962, 1963 and 1965). Throughout his parliamentary career, he represented the riding of Algoma East in northern Ontario. He won each election by a majority of more than 50% of the votes, even in multi-candidate elections. He served in the Commons for 19 years, 7 months, and 30 days.

In 1968, Pearson announced his retirement and was succeeded as Liberal leader and prime minister by Pierre Trudeau.

== Federal general elections: 1958 to 1965 ==
Pearson led the Liberals in four general elections. He was defeated in the general elections of 1958 and 1962, but won minority governments in the elections of 1963 and 1965.

=== Federal election, 1958 ===
After winning the Liberal leadership, Pearson challenged the legitimacy of Diefenbaker's minority government. In response, Diefenbaker called a snap election. He won the largest majority in Canadian history and decimated the Liberals. In spite of the poor election results, Pearson stayed on as Liberal leader and Leader of the Opposition.

Canadian Federal Election, 1958 - Parties, Leaders, Seats Won and Popular Vote
Party	Leaders	Seats Won	Popular Vote
Progressive Conservative	John Diefenbaker^{1}	208	53.7%
Liberal	Lester B. Pearson^{2}	48	33.4%
Co-operative Commonwealth Federation	Major James Coldwell	8	9.5%
Liberal–Labour	–	1	0.2%
Total		265	98.2%^{3}
Sources: Library of Parliament – History of Federal Ridings since 1867

^{1} Prime Minister when election was called; Prime Minister after election.
^{2} Leader of the Opposition when election was called; Leader of the Opposition after the election.
^{3} Table does not include parties which received votes but did not elect any members.

=== Federal election, 1962 ===
Pearson again led the Liberals in the 1962 election. Diefenbaker was returned to office, but with a minority government. The Liberals under Pearson made considerable gains, more than doubling their representation in the Commons.

Canadian Federal Election, 1962 - Parties, Leaders, Seats Won and Popular Vote
Party	Leaders	Seats Won	Popular Vote
Progressive Conservative	John Diefenbaker^{1}	116	37.2%
Liberal	Lester B. Pearson^{2}	99	37.0%
Social Credit	Robert N. Thompson	30	11.6%
New Democratic Party	Tommy Douglas	19	13.6%
Liberal–Labour	–	1	0.2%
Total		265	99.6%^{3}
Sources: Library of Parliament – History of Federal Ridings since 1867

^{1} Prime Minister when election was called; Prime Minister after election.
^{2} Leader of the Opposition when election was called; Leader of the Opposition after the election.
^{3} Table does not include parties which received votes but did not elect any members.

=== Federal election, 1963 ===
Less than a year after the 1962 election, Diefenbaker's minority government fell on a motion of non-confidence, triggering the dissolution of Parliament and a general election. Pearson and the Liberals won the most seats, but fell five seats short of a majority. Pearson become prime minister of a minority government, and Diefenbaker became Leader of the Opposition.

Canadian Federal Election, 1963 - Parties, Leaders, Seats Won and Popular Vote
Party	Leaders	Seats Won	Popular Vote
Liberal	Lester B. Pearson^{1}	128	41.5%
Progressive Conservative	John Diefenbaker^{2}	95	32.8%
Social Credit	Robert N. Thompson	24	11.9%
New Democratic Party	Tommy Douglas	17	13.2%
Liberal–Labour	–	1	0.2%
Total		265	99.6%^{3}
Sources: Library of Parliament – History of Federal Ridings since 1867

^{1} Leader of the Opposition when election was called; Prime Minister after election.
^{2} Prime Minister when election was called; Leader of the Opposition after the election.
^{3} Table does not include parties which received votes but did not elect any members.

=== Federal election, 1965 ===
After two years of minority government, Pearson called an election. The result was another hung parliament. The Liberals increased their seat total, but again fell short of an outright majority, this time by two seats. Pearson governed with a minority government for three years, retiring in 1968.

Canadian Federal Election, 1965 - Parties, Leaders, Seats Won and Popular Vote
Party	Leaders	Seats Won	Popular Vote
Liberal	Lester B. Pearson^{1}	131	40.2%
Progressive Conservative	John Diefenbaker^{2}	97	32.4%
New Democratic Party	Tommy Douglas	21	17.9%
Ralliement créditiste	Réal Caouette	9	4.7%
Social Credit	Robert N. Thompson	5	3.7%
Independent	–	1	0.7%
Independent PC	–	1	0.2%
Total		265	99.8%^{3}
Sources: Library of Parliament – History of Federal Ridings since 1867

== Federal constituency elections, 1948 to 1965 ==
Pearson stood for election to the House of Commons eight times, starting with a by-election in 1948. He was elected all eight times, all from the northern Ontario riding of Algoma East.

=== 1948 Federal By-Election: Algoma East ===
The 1948 by-election was triggered by the appointment of the incumbent Member of Parliament, Thomas Farquhar to the Senate on September 10, 1948.

Federal By-election, October 25, 1948: Algoma East, Ontario
Party	Candidate	Popular Vote	%
Liberal	Yes Lester B. Pearson	4,685	56.4%
Co-operative Commonwealth Federation	Lorne D. Callaghan	2,382	28.7%
Social Credit	John J. Fitzgerald	1,236	14.9%
Total		8,303	100.0%
Source: Library of Parliament – History of Federal Ridings since 1867: Algoma East

Yes Elected.

=== 1949 Federal Election: Algoma East ===
Federal Election, 1949: Algoma East, Ontario
Party	Candidate	Popular Vote	%
Liberal	Yes X Lester B. Pearson	6,184	54.8%
Progressive Conservative	Grant H. Turner	2,908	25.7%
Co-operative Commonwealth Federation	George Thornton	2,202	19.5%
Total		11,294	100.0%
Source: Library of Parliament – History of Federal Ridings since 1867: Algoma East

Yes Elected.
X Incumbent.

=== 1953 Federal Election: Algoma East ===
Federal Election, 1953: Algoma East, Ontario
Party	Candidate	Popular Vote	%
Liberal	Yes X Lester B. Pearson	7,494	65.9%
Progressive Conservative	George H. Bishop	3,877	34.1%
Total		11,371	100.0%
Source: Library of Parliament – History of Federal Ridings since 1867: Algoma East

Yes Elected.
X Incumbent.

=== 1957 Federal Election: Algoma East ===
Federal Election, 1957: Algoma East, Ontario
Party	Candidate	Popular Vote	%
Liberal	Yes X Lester B. Pearson	8,574	52.0%
Progressive Conservative	H. Merton Mulligan	5,757	34.9%
Co-operative Commonwealth Federation	Martin S. Reid	2,156	13.1%
Total		16,487	100.0%
Source: Library of Parliament – History of Federal Ridings since 1867: Algoma East

Yes Elected.
X Incumbent.

=== 1958 Federal Election: Algoma East ===
Federal Election, 1958: Algoma East, Ontario
Party	Candidate	Popular Vote	%
Liberal	Yes X Lester B. Pearson	11,240	51.7%
Progressive Conservative	Basil Scully	8,208	37.7%
Co-operative Commonwealth Federation	Walter James Corbett	2,309	10.6%
Total		21,757	100.0%
Source: Library of Parliament – History of Federal Ridings since 1867: Algoma East

Yes Elected.
X Incumbent.

=== 1962 Federal Election: Algoma East ===
Federal Election, 1962: Algoma East, Ontario
Party	Candidate	Popular Vote	%
Liberal	Yes X Lester B. Pearson	11,934	57.6%
Progressive Conservative	Alex Berthelot	5,631	27.2%
New Democratic Party	Cam Cork	3,168	15.3%
Total		20,733	100.1%^{1}
Source: Library of Parliament – History of Federal Ridings since 1867: Algoma East

Yes Elected.
X Incumbent.
^{1} Rounding error.

=== 1963 Federal Election: Algoma East ===
Federal Election, 1963: Algoma East, Ontario
Party	Candidate	Popular Vote	%
Liberal	Yes X Lester B. Pearson	10,817	52.2%
Progressive Conservative	Paul Jewell	6,146	29.6%
Social Credit	Irénée John Quenneville	2,016	9.7%
New Democratic Party	Bennett Donahue	1,751	8.4%
Total		20,730	99.9%^{1}
Source: Library of Parliament – History of Federal Ridings since 1867: Algoma East

Yes Elected.
X Incumbent.
^{1} Rounding error.

=== 1965 Federal Election: Algoma East ===
Federal Election, 1965: Algoma East, Ontario
Party	Candidate	Popular Vote	%
Liberal	Yes X Lester B. Pearson	9,268	54.2%
Progressive Conservative	Joel W. Aldred	5,793	33.8%
New Democratic Party	Walter Stuart	2,053	12.0%
Total		17,114	100.0%
Source: Library of Parliament – History of Federal Ridings since 1867: Algoma East

Yes Elected.
X Incumbent.

== 1958 Liberal Party leadership election ==
Pearson entered the convention as the favourite, with the support of many of the party establishment. Paul Martin Sr., the only other serious candidate, hoped to attract the rank and file of the party. Pearson won on the first ballot.

Liberal Leadership Convention, January 16, 1958 Voting results by ballot
Candidate	First Ballot	
Candidate	Votes cast	%
Lester B. Pearson	1074	77.8%
Paul Martin Sr.	305	22.1%
Harold Lloyd Henderson	1	0.1%
Total	1,380	100.0%
Source: CPAC – 1958 Liberal Convention

== See also ==
- Electoral history of John Diefenbaker – Pearson's predecessor as prime minister and principal opponent in four general elections.
- Electoral history of Louis St. Laurent – Pearson's predecessor as leader of the Liberal Party.
- Electoral history of Pierre Trudeau – Pearson's successor as leader of the Liberal Party and as prime minister.
