= Electoral history of Louis St. Laurent =

List of elections featuring Louis St. Laurent as a candidate

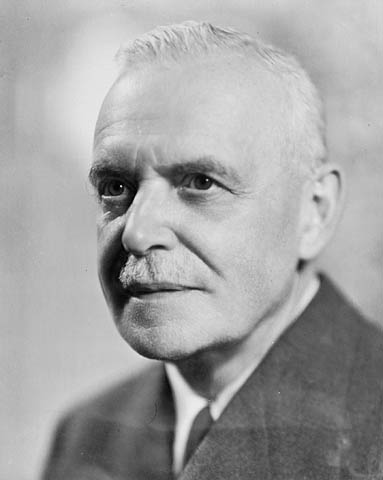
St. Laurent in 1950.

This article is the electoral history of Louis St. Laurent, the twelfth prime minister of Canada (1948–1957).

A Liberal, St. Laurent served one term as prime minister (1948–1957), succeeding William Lyon Mackenzie King. He won two general elections (1948, 1953) and lost one (1957). John Diefenbaker succeeded him as prime minister, while Lester Pearson became the leader of the Liberal Party.

He stood for election to the House of Commons of Canada five times, all successfully.

== Summary ==
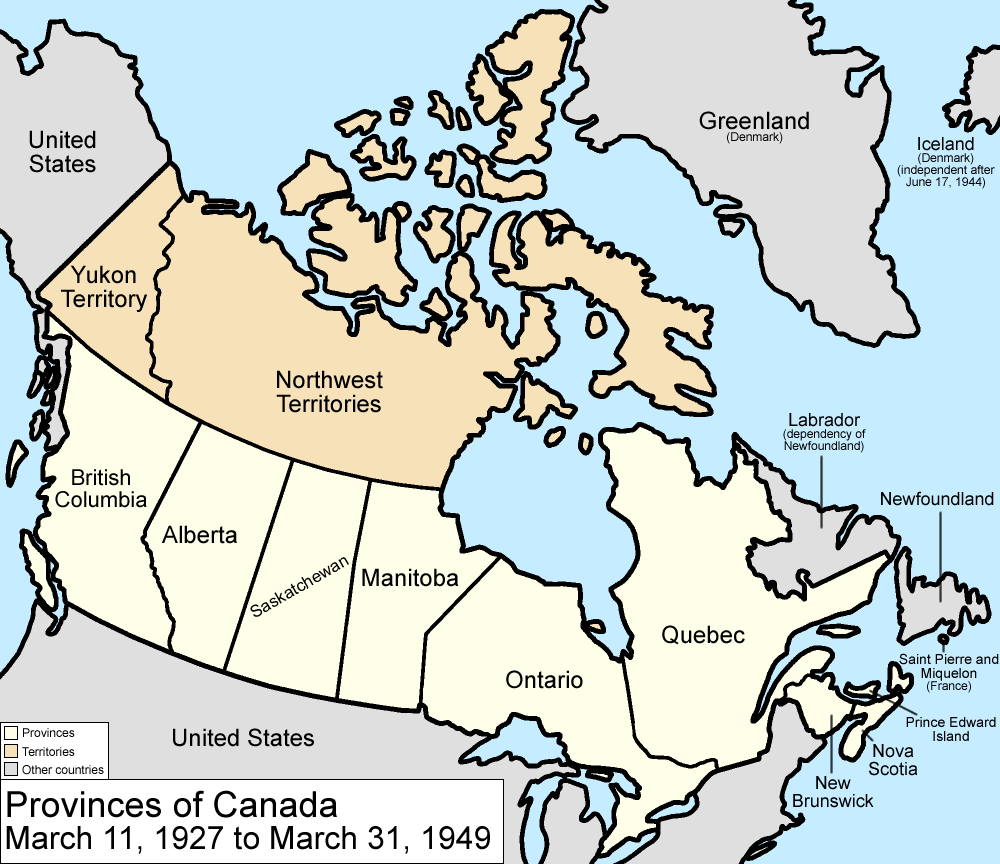
Canada had nine provinces and two territories when St. Laurent became Prime Minister in 1948.

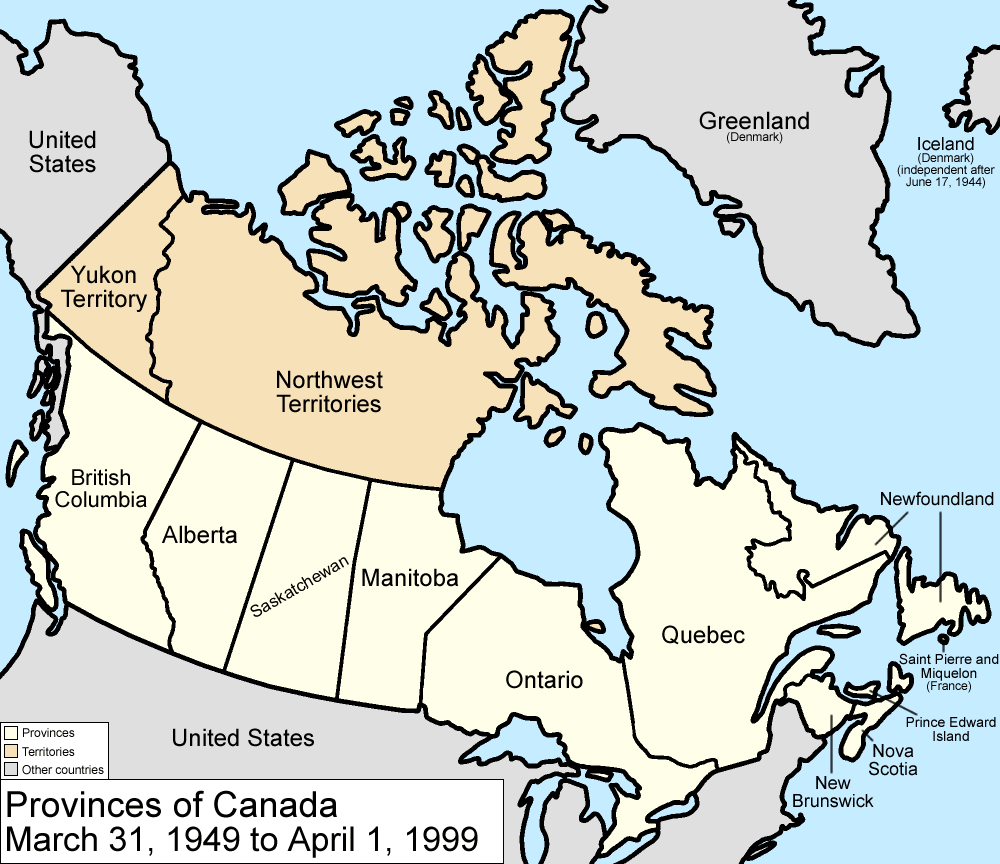
Canada had ten provinces and two territories when St. Laurent left office in 1957.

St. Laurent ranks ninth out of twenty-three prime ministers for time in office, serving one term of eight years and 218 days.

St. Laurent was the third of eight prime ministers from Quebec, the others being Sir John Abbott, Sir Wilfrid Laurier, Pierre Trudeau, Brian Mulroney, Jean Chrétien, Paul Martin and Justin Trudeau. He was also the second of five francophone prime ministers, the others being Laurier, Pierre Trudeau, Chrétien, and Justin Trudeau.

A late-comer to politics, St. Laurent was a well-respected lawyer when Prime Minister Mackenzie King recruited him to the federal government, to replace Ernest Lapointe, King's long-time Quebec lieutenant, who had died suddenly. St. Laurent served in King's government as Minister of Justice and Minister of External Affairs, as well as King's political Quebec lieutenant. When King retired after his lengthy time in office, he supported St. Laurent for the leadership of the Liberal Party. St. Laurent won on the first ballot and automatically became prime minister.

St. Laurent led the Liberal Party in two general elections in 1949 and 1953, winning majority governments each time. However, in his third general election, the major issue was the building of a trans-Canada gas pipeline, with financing from the federal government. The financing proposal triggered a controversial debate in the House of Commons, which St. Laurent's government ended by the use of closure to push the measure through the Commons. St. Laurent and the Liberals were defeated in the general election of 1957, with John Diefenbaker forming a minority government. St. Laurent stayed on as Liberal leader and Leader of the Opposition for half a year after the election. He resigned as Liberal leader early in 1958 and retired from politics. He was succeeded as Liberal leader by Lester B. Pearson.

St. Laurent stood for election to the Canadian House of Commons five times, all for the riding of Quebec East. He was elected each time (1942 (by-election), 1945, 1949, 1953 and 1957). He served in the Commons for a total of 16 years, 1 month, 20 days.

== Federal general elections, 1949 to 1957 ==
St. Laurent led the Liberal Party in three general elections, winning two majority governments and losing once.

=== Federal election, 1949 ===
St. Laurent won a decisive victory in the 1949 election. George Drew, the leader of the Progressive Conservative Party of Canada, continued as Leader of the Opposition.

Canadian Federal Election, 1949 - Parties, Leaders, Seats Won and Popular Vote
Party	Leaders	Seats Won	Popular Vote
Liberal	Louis St. Laurent^{1}	191	49.2%
Progressive Conservative	George A. Drew^{2}	41	29.7%
Co-operative Commonwealth Federation	M. J. Coldwell	13	13.4%
Social Credit	Solon Earl Low	10	2.3%
Independent	–	4	2.1%
Independent Liberal	–	1	0.5%
Liberal-Labour	–	1	0.2%
Liberal–Progressive	–	1	0.2%
Total		262	97.6%^{3}
Sources: Library of Parliament – History of Federal Ridings since 1867

^{1} Prime Minister when election was called; Prime Minister after election.
^{2} Leader of the Opposition when election was called; Leader of the Opposition after the election.
^{3} Table does not include parties which received votes but did not elect any members.

=== Federal election, 1953 ===
St. Laurent won a second victory in the 1953 election, though with a reduced majority. George Drew, the leader of the Progressive Conservative Party of Canada, continued as Leader of the Opposition.

Canadian Federal Election, 1953 - Parties, Leaders, Seats Won and Popular Vote
Party	Leaders	Seats Won	Popular Vote
Liberal	Louis St. Laurent^{1}	169	48.4%
Progressive Conservative	George A. Drew^{2}	51	31.0%
Co-operative Commonwealth Federation	M. J. Coldwell	23	11.3%
Social Credit	Solon Earl Low	15	5.4%
Independent	–	3	1.0%
Independent Liberal	–	2	1.2%
Liberal–Progressive	–	1	1.1%
Liberal-Labour	–	1	0.2%
Total		265	99.6%^{3}
Sources: Library of Parliament – History of Federal Ridings since 1867

^{1} Prime Minister when election was called; Prime Minister after election.
^{2} Leader of the Opposition when election was called; Leader of the Opposition after the election.
^{3} Table does not include parties which received votes but did not elect any members.

=== Federal election, 1957 ===
St. Laurent went to the polls a third time in 1957, but the election resulted in a hung parliament, with no party having a majority. Although the Liberals came in first in the popular vote, they came in second in seats in the House of Commons, behind John Diefenbaker and the Progressive Conservatives. St. Laurent resigned and Diefenbaker formed a minority government. St. Laurent became Leader of the Opposition, but resigned as Liberal leader in early 1958 and retired from politics.

Canadian Federal Election, 1957 - Parties, Leaders, Seats Won and Popular Vote
Party	Leaders	Seats Won	Popular Vote
Progressive Conservative	John Diefenbaker^{1}	112	38.5%
Liberal	Louis St. Laurent^{2}	105	40.5%
Co-operative Commonwealth Federation	M. J. Coldwell	25	10.6%
Social Credit	Solon Earl Low	19	6.5%
Others	–	4	1.0%
Spoiled ballots	–	–	1.1%
Total		265	98.2%^{3}
Sources: Library of Parliament – History of Federal Ridings since 1867

^{1} Leader of the Opposition when election was called; Prime Minister after election.
^{2} Prime Minister when election was called; Leader of the Opposition after the election.
^{3} Table does not include parties which received votes but did not elect any members.

== Federal constituency elections, 1942 to 1957 ==
By-election on 9 February 1942 On Lapointe's death, 26 November 1941
Party	Candidate	Votes
Liberal	Louis St. Laurent	16,708
Canadian Party	Paul Bouchard	12,768

1945 Canadian federal election: Quebec East
Party	Candidate	Votes
Liberal	Louis St. Laurent	17,965
Independent	Noël Dorion	7,197
Social Credit	Gérard Mercier	2,816
Bloc populaire	Joseph-Norbert-Jules Thérien	1,463
Independent	Paul-Émile Latouche	280
Co-operative Commonwealth	François-Xavier Perron	231
Labor–Progressive	Joseph-Gaudias De Croiselles	109

1949 Canadian federal election: Quebec East
Party	Candidate	Votes
Liberal	Louis St. Laurent	25,832
Progressive Conservative	Mark Robert Drouin	7,876
Union des électeurs	Alphonse Tousignant	1,395

ॗ

1953 Canadian federal election: Quebec East
Party	Candidate	Votes
Liberal	Louis St. Laurent	25,945
Progressive Conservative	Raymond Maher	5,841
Labor–Progressive	Gérard Fortin	438
Locataire	Louis Seigneur	417
Anti-Communist	Patrick Walsh	333

1957 Canadian federal election: Quebec East
Party	Candidate	Votes
Liberal	Louis St. Laurent	27,364
Progressive Conservative	Louis Gagnon	9,900
Social Credit	Roland Roy	739

== 1948 Liberal Party leadership election ==
St. Laurent entered the convention as the favourite, with King's support in opposition to James Gardiner, the long-time Minister of Agriculture from Saskatchewan. St. Laurent won on the first ballot, after most other nominees dropped out as a result of King's manoeuvering behind the scenes.

Liberal Leadership Convention, August 7, 1948 Voting results by ballot
Candidate	First Ballot	
Candidate	Votes cast	%
Louis St. Laurent	848	69.1%
James Garfield Gardiner	323	26.3%
Charles Gavan Power	56	4.6%
Douglas Abbott*	–	–
Lionel Chevrier*	–	–
Brooke Claxton*	–	–
Stuart Garson*	–	–
C.D. Howe*	–	–
Paul Martin Sr.*	–	–
Total	1,227	100.0%
Source: CPAC – 1948 Liberal Convention

- Nominated, but withdrew on the floor of the convention prior to the first ballot.

== See also ==
- Electoral history of William Lyon Mackenzie King – St. Laurent's predecessor as leader of the Liberal Party and as prime minister.
- Electoral history of John Diefenbaker – St. Laurent's successor as prime minister.
- Electoral history of Lester B. Pearson – St. Laurent's successor as leader of the Liberal Party.
