= 1967 Progressive Conservative leadership election =

Canadian election

1967 Progressive Conservative Party leadership election
- September 9, 1967

2,231 delegates in the 1st ballot 1,116 delegate votes needed to win
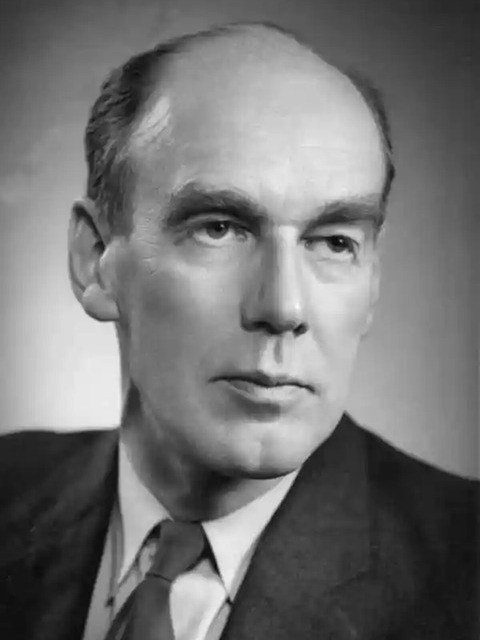

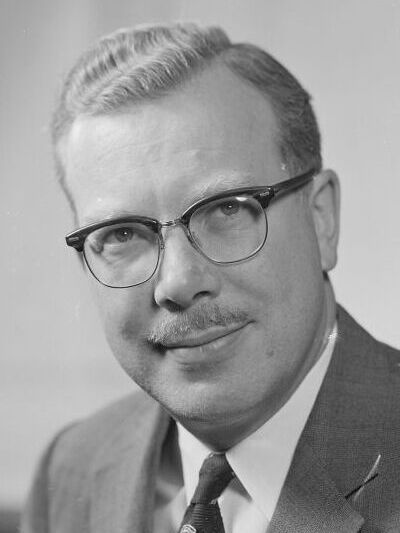

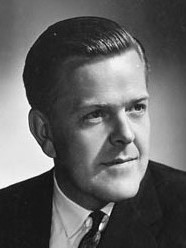

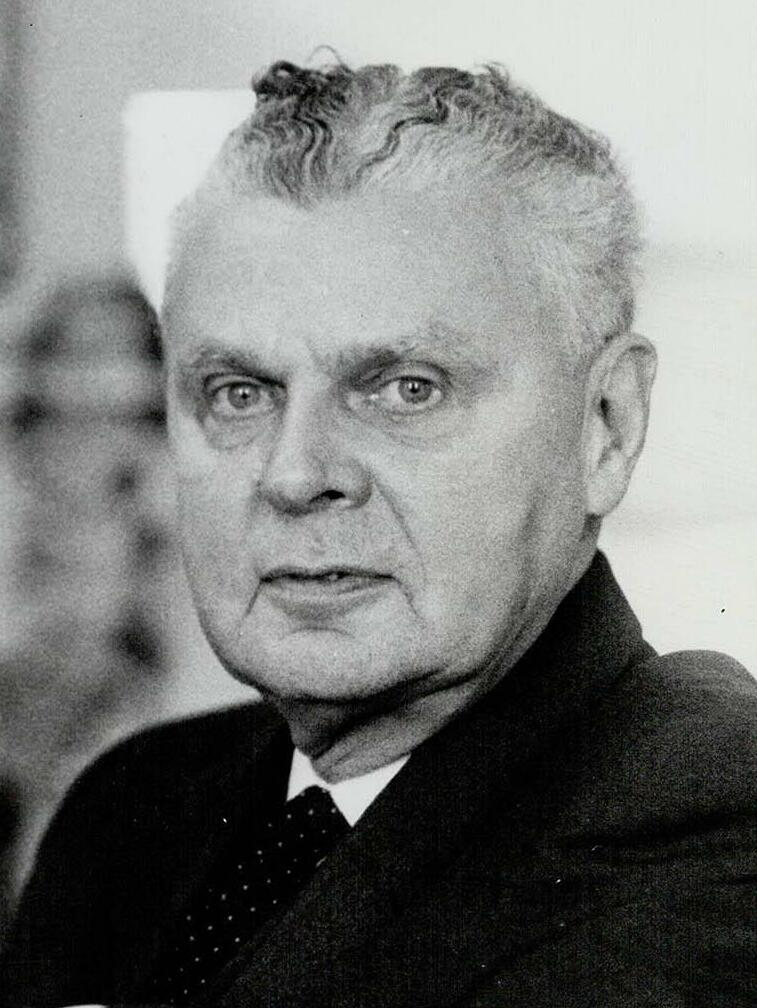
Candidate	Robert Stanfield	Dufferin Roblin	Davie Fulton
Fifth ballot delegate count	1,150 (54.3%)	969 (45.7%)	Withdrew
Fourth ballot delegate count	865 (40.1%)	771 (35.7%)	357 (16.5%)
Third ballot delegate count	717 (32.7%)	541 (24.7%)	361 (16.5%)
Second ballot delegate count	613 (27.7%)	430 (19.4%)	346 (15.7%)
First ballot delegate count	519 (23.3%)	347 (15.6%)	343 (15.4%)
Candidate	Alvin Hamilton	George Hees	John Diefenbaker
Fifth ballot delegate count	Eliminated	Withdrew	Withdrew
Fourth ballot delegate count	167 (7.7%)	Withdrew	Withdrew
Third ballot delegate count	106 (4.8%)	277 (12.6%)	114 (5.2%)
Second ballot delegate count	127 (5.8%)	299 (13.5%)	172 (7.8%)
First ballot delegate count	136 (6.1%)	295 (13.2%)	271 (12.2%)
Leader before election
John Diefenbaker
Elected Leader
Robert Stanfield

1967 Progressive Conservative leadership election
- Date: September 9, 1967
- Convention: Maple Leaf Gardens, Toronto, Ontario
- Resigning leader: John Diefenbaker
- Won by: Robert Stanfield
- Ballots: 5
- Candidates: 11
- Spending limit: None

The 1967 Progressive Conservative leadership election was held to choose a leader for the Progressive Conservative Party of Canada, after the party membership voted that incumbent party leader and former Prime Minister John Diefenbaker should be forced to re-run for his position. The convention was held at Maple Leaf Gardens in Toronto, Ontario, Canada between September 4 and 9, 1967. Premier of Nova Scotia Robert Stanfield was elected the new leader.

Of the eleven entrants to the contest, seven including Diefenbaker himself had at some point been cabinet members in his government between 1957 and 1963. However, in every round of voting the top two candidates were Stanfield and Premier of Manitoba Dufferin Roblin, reflecting the party membership's desire for a clean break from the Diefenbaker era. Two minor candidates, John MacLean and Mary Walker-Sawka entered the contest, with both dropping out following the first round after earning a minimal number of votes, though Walker-Sawka's candidacy marked the first time that a woman had run for the leadership of a major Canadian political party.

== Background ==
The leader was elected by the approximately 2,200 delegates to the convention who voted. Most of the delegates were elected from the party's associations in each riding (electoral district), as well as from the party's women's and youth associations.

However, many delegates were ex officio delegates, i.e., they received delegate status as a result of their positions on the national executive committee of the party, the executives of its affiliated provincial parties, and the party's national women's and youth organizations. Former and current Progressive Conservative (PC) Members of Parliament and Senators were also ex officio delegates.

Traditionally, once elected, leaders of the party remained in the position until they resigned or died. In this case, however, the convention was called after the party membership passed a resolution to force a leadership convention even though party leader John Diefenbaker was unwilling to resign. Many in the party believed that his mercurial leadership when the party was in government from 1957 to 1963, and his failure to win the support of Canadian voters the 1963 and 1965 federal elections meant that he would be unable to lead the party back to government. Party president Dalton Camp organized the successful campaign within the party to force a leadership convention.

== Issues ==
The campaign for the leadership hinged on two main issues:

1. where the candidates stood on the question of Diefenbaker's leadership, and
2. where the candidates stood on the controversial Deux Nations policy.

Diefenbaker had engendered considerable loyalty amongst Conservatives during his time as leader because of his passionate speaking style, and his fierce commitment to Canada. Diefenbaker had led the party to the biggest victory in a Canadian federal election (to that time) in the 1958 election, winning 208 of the 265 seats available in the House of Commons. On the other hand, divisions and infighting in his Cabinet had led to the party's defeat in the 1963 election, with the following election two years later failing to improve the party's position.

The controversial Deux Nations policy had been proposed by the party's "Thinkers’ Conference", held in August 1967 at Montmorency Falls, Quebec, as a way of reconciling the role of the Province of Quebec within Canadian confederation. The Thinkers’ Conference described the policy as a statement that "English Canadians and French Canadians form two distinct societies with differing backgrounds, personalities and aspirations." The phrase "distinct society" returned in the 1980s to be a key component of proposals to amend the Canadian constitution during the debate over the Meech Lake Accord and the Charlottetown Accord.

The policy proposal was endorsed at the convention by the party's Policy Committee by a vote of approximately 150 to 12.

Opponents of the policy were concerned that the French deux nations would be interpreted in English as "two nations", i.e., the end of a united Canada. The proponents argued that deux nations meant "two founding peoples".

In their final speeches to the convention, all of the candidates addressed the issue, but the issue did not "ignite" the delegates:

- Stanfield tried to distance himself from the issue by arguing that the Policy Committee resolution was not clear enough, and the French Canadians wanted more than just the right to enjoy linguistic distinctiveness.
- Roblin supported deux nations, explaining that two European cultures had decided to live as one nation.
- Fulton also tried to avoid the argument saying that it was about semantics, and that the real point was that Canada was founded by "two races, two cultures, two peoples".
- Fleming tried to straddle the fence, saying that the meaning was unclear, and would oppose it if Diefenbaker's "two nations" interpretation were correct, but accepted that it meant "two founding peoples".
- Hees supported the resolution as meaning "two founding peoples".
- McCutcheon said that he was "not afraid to say" deux nations because it meant "two cultures", not "two sovereign entities".
- Starr argued that the policies would be unfair to other cultures in Canada, that all provinces should be equal, and that the party should not adopt a policy on the issue because Quebecers themselves were not clear on what they wanted.
- MacLean supported the policy.

== Candidates ==
Robert Stanfield, the 53-year-old PC Premier of Nova Scotia, was a late entrant to the campaign, and was the eventual victor. He had disclaimed any interest in running for the federal leadership having won a healthy mandate in the spring 1967 Nova Scotia election. He finally bowed to pressure from Dalton Camp and other Ontario opponents of Diefenbaker, and joined the race. According to reportage in the Toronto Star, it was his "honesty, forthrightness, and quiet demeanour" that set him apart from other candidates. Stanfield was supported by many party members from the Maritime provinces, but had little support from Quebec or the Western provinces. Running as a "right-of-centre" candidate, his successful convention presence, and especially his very well received speech at the Tuesday night policy session, attracted many of the anti-Diefenbaker delegates, and made him "the man to beat".

Dufferin Roblin, the 50-year-old PC Premier of Manitoba, was another late entrant to the campaign. He was the youngest serious contender, and was reported to have the behind-the-scenes support of the conservative Union Nationale party in Quebec. He portrayed himself as having been outside of the fighting over Diefenbaker's leadership, and independent of the Diefenbaker and Camp bloc. He would therefore be able to bring the party together. Roblin was seen to be on the left of the party, i.e., supported by Red Tories. He delivered an emotional appeal at the policy session for harmony between English-speaking Canadians and French-speaking Canadians. His call for party unity struck a chord with delegates, and it appeared as though he might lead on the first ballot. His Quebec delegates, however, were very critical of Diefenbaker at the convention, and undermined Roblin's image as a compromise candidate.

E. Davie Fulton, a 51-year-old lawyer from British Columbia had been defeated in the 1956 leadership convention by Diefenbaker. He had served as Minister of Justice and then Minister of Public Works in the Diefenbaker government, and left federal politics in 1963 to take over the leadership of the British Columbia PC Party. His attempt to revive that party's fortunes failed, and he returned to federal politics in the 1965 election. His campaign was run by Lowell Murray, later to be an important figure in the next PC government under Joe Clark. To support from his home province, he added considerable support from Quebec because of his ability to speak French. He was plagued with the reputation of being a bad politician, but he dispelled that notion during the campaign. He campaigned under the slogan, "It's Fulton - All across Canada!"

George Hees, the 57-year-old former Minister of Transport and then Minister of International Trade and Commerce in the Diefenbaker government, was described as a "millionaire bon vivant". Hees had been successful as trade minister, aggressively promoting Canadian trade in other countries, but left politics before the 1963 election. As head of the Montreal Stock Exchange, however, he had done nothing innovative, and returned to politics in the 1965 election. Hees did not come across as an intellectual, but injected glamour into the campaign, spending the most of any of the candidates, an estimated $200,000. The Globe and Mail newspaper noted that, surrounded by chanting young supporters, the "arrival of Hees was like something from Hollywood". Hees descended from one of two red London double-decker buses that he had hired to transport his campaign workers between his headquarters at the Royal York Hotel and the convention centre at Maple Leaf Gardens. Hees's speech, delivered in carnival-barker style, at the Tuesday night policy session, however, was not well received by delegates, and his support began to drift off to other candidates.

John Diefenbaker, the 72-year-old party leader and former prime minister, kept the other candidates, the delegates, observers and pundits waiting for his decision on whether or not he would run to succeed himself until the very last minute. He filed his nomination papers for the convention very close to the closing of nominations. Although he could not reasonably have expected to win, putting his name into the race allowed him one more opportunity to address the convention, and to appeal to the party to reject the ‘’Deux Nations’’ policy. By letting his name stand, however, he was pledging his support for the winner under the rules of the convention.

Wallace McCutcheon, a 61-year-old Senator joined the campaign to be the voice of the party's right-wing. He had served as Minister without Portfolio in Diefenbaker's government, and then as Minister of Trade and Commerce. He campaigned aggressively against "big government" and "creeping socialism". McCutcheon was seen as the candidate of Bay Street (Toronto's financial district). He used dozens of attractive young women in his demonstration at the convention (dubbed "blonde goddesses" by the Toronto Star). He advocated a guaranteed annual income of $10,000 per adult as an alternative to the various social programs offered by different levels of government. He proposed a "made-in-Canada" constitution to replace the British North America Acts and to guarantee the rights of Canadians, including language and cultural rights.

Alvin Hamilton, the 55-year-old former Minister of Northern Affairs and National Resources and Minister of Agriculture in the Diefenbaker government, had stayed out of the leadership campaign while Diefenbaker dithered about running. He appealed to Diefenbaker loyalists, but remained in the race even when Diefenbaker decided at the last moment to seek the leadership again, and continued to call himself a Diefenbaker loyalist. Hamilton warned the party that the delegates to the convention were out of touch with the grassroots of the party, and presented himself as the main alternative to the "reactionary conservative" candidates, and was opposed to the "continentalism" of the Liberal Party. His campaign used signed that portrayed a red-yellow-green traffic light with the slogan "Stop - Think - Go Hamilton".

Donald Fleming, 62, had run for and lost the PC leadership twice already. Having served as Minister of Finance and then Minister of Justice in Diefenbaker's government, he had left Parliament in 1963, and had only reluctantly agreed to run for the leadership this time. His campaign had a promising start, attracting many Diefenbaker loyalists, but had fizzled when Roblin and then Stanfield joined the campaign. Over the two months leading up to the campaign, Fleming's supporters steadily left his campaign to join those of the two provincial premiers, and then to Diefenbaker when he finally joined the campaign. Fleming was seen as an old man who had little to offer but sound fiscal policy. He had been promised a large bloc of Quebec votes by Jean-Paul Cardinal, an organizer for Quebec premier Daniel Johnson, Sr, but these votes failed to materialize. Fleming's campaign slogan was "Unite with Fleming". He had the support of many Diefenbaker loyalists, and was rumoured before the convention to have the support of Diefenbaker himself.

Michael Starr, 56, former Minister of Labour in Diefenbaker's government, MP for Oshawa, Ontario, and PC House Leader in the House of Commons, was considered to be the most loyal of the Diefenbaker supporters, and declared that he was running only because Diefenbaker was not. Many believed that he was just a “stalking horse” for Diefenbaker, i.e., trying to hold delegates’ support until Diefenbaker himself joined the campaign. Starr did not, however, withdraw when Diefenbaker joined the campaign, and even stayed for the second ballot even though he had won only a few votes. Starr did little campaigning prior to the convention because he said that he did not have the resources of the other candidates. He focused on meeting delegates at the convention, but by then, most of his campaign team, headed by future Deputy Prime Minister Erik Nielsen, had quit in frustration over the lack of organization, and joined other campaigns. Starr proposed a “wage and price freeze” to fight inflation – a policy that ended up as the centrepiece of the 1974 PC campaign, and replacing personal income taxation by a “trading tax” on goods and services – a policy that was implemented by the PC government of Brian Mulroney in 1990. He also proposed that the British North America Acts be brought back to Canada without amendments. During the campaign he suggested that Canada withdraw from the North Atlantic Treaty Organization, a comment that he later regretted and withdrew.

John MacLean was an unsuccessful PC candidate in the 1965 election who was the first to declare his candidacy for the leadership. The 40-year-old was the operator of a Hertz car rental agency and British Petroleum gas station in Brockville, Ontario. MacLean had worked as a journalist for the Toronto Telegram, Quebec Chronicle, Ottawa Journal, Financial Post and Toronto Star newspapers. In the 1965 election, he was narrowly defeated, receiving 10,066 votes (47.1% of the total vote), compared to Liberal candidate Ross Matheson's 10,365. Maclean set himself up as the spokesperson for youth in the party, and ran largely in order to create a larger role for himself in the party. He was not successful in doing this: he failed to win a delegateship from his home riding of Leeds, and was also defeated for the PC nomination in the riding during the campaign by Desmond Code, who was the sitting MP for neighbouring Lanark riding. He said that the party should declare a moratorium on tax increases, and aim to “squeeze” government spending in order to reduce taxes, and train a corps of military specialists for civilian emergencies in Canada and abroad. His speech at the convention also did not increase the party's respect for him: he spoke without a prepared text for only 12 of the 19 minutes allotted to him.

Mary Walker-Sawka, a 51-year-old movie producer and freelance writer, was a surprise last-minute candidate. She was the first woman ever to seek the leadership of a major political party in Canada. She said that she was a Diefenbaker supporter, but was running because she felt she could “add a few things” to Diefenbaker's program. She gave a short speech setting out her ideas for PC party policy:

- Canada should withdraw from NATO and North American Aerospace Defense Command (NORAD);
- Canada should closely supervise its foreign aid programs to ensure that aid does not end up on the black market;
- all houses more than 20 or 30 years old should be torn down and re-built;
- Old Age Security payments should be increased to $100 per month;
- the education system should be modernized, and at least six languages should be taught in schools;
- the 11% federal sales tax should be eliminated.

When she was nominated at the convention, she had no seconder. Some time passed before a female Hees supporter seconded Walker-Sawka's nomination in order to save her the embarrassment. Walker-Sawka called upon the women of the party to stand with her. She won only two votes on the first ballot, and was dropped from the ballot.

=== Declined ===
- Ellen Fairclough, 62, formerly MP for Hamilton West from 1950 to 1963. She had been the first-ever woman to sit in the cabinet of a Canadian government, holding various positions under Diefenbaker, including briefly being acting Prime Minister in his absence during 1958. Walker-Sawka's candidacy led to unfounded rumours that she was a stalking horse for either a last-minute Fairclough leadership bid or a movement to draft her, but neither materialised, and Fairclough had in any event previously stated that she would only return to front-line politics if she were offered a seat in the Senate.
- Douglas Harkness, 64, MP for Calgary North since 1953. He had been Minister of National Defence between 1960 and 1963, and had earned admirers in that role for his decisiveness during the Cuban Missile Crisis, but was also blamed by many for his role in the downfall of the Diefenbaker government after his dramatic resignation in February 1963, and was content as a backbench MP in any event.
- John Robarts, 50, Premier of Ontario since 1961. He had been praised for his hosting of a "Confederation of Tomorrow" conference earlier in 1967 in an attempt to address Quebec separatism and western alienation, which were seen as key issues going into the leadership election. However, Robarts was also facing a statutory provincial election that year, and felt it would be the wrong time to step away from his role as Premier.
- Robert N. Thompson, 53, MP for Red Deer since 1962, and former leader of the Social Credit Party of Canada until his defection to the Progressive Conservatives earlier in 1967. The timing of this move led to press speculation that Thompson intended to run to succeed Diefenbaker and then merge the Progressive Conservatives with Social Credit, but Thompson publicly denied that he had any intention of running for the leadership.

== The campaign ==
John MacLean was the first candidate to enter the race in January 1967. As an unknown, he was not taken seriously, and the campaign did not begin in earnest until George Hees and Davie Fulton joined the campaign. For most of the campaign, Hees and Fulton appeared to be the most likely winners. Stanfield's entry on July 19 changed the situation dramatically. Duff Roblin's entry on August 3 – a little more than a month before the vote—changed the campaign again as the campaign began to focus more on the two popular premiers. Support for Donald Fleming's campaign, in particular, began to decline as his supporters left to join the Stanfield and Roblin campaigns.

There was considerable pressure on Ontario premier John Robarts to join the race until he announced on September 5 that the province would be holding an election on October 17.

Going into the convention, it appeared that any one of four candidates could win: Roblin, Fulton, Stanfield and Hees. There were many uncommitted delegates, especially from Quebec.

== The convention ==
Stanfield arrived at the convention with considerable momentum, but it was his speech to the Policy Session of the convention on the Tuesday night that made him the candidate to beat. Hees, on the other hand, delivered his speech to the Policy Session like a carnival barker, and made Hees victory unlikely.

Among the many rumours circulating during the convention was one of a deal between Stanfield and Fulton that whichever candidate won fewer votes would withdraw and support the other. Speculation mounted further about whether or not John Diefenbaker would let his name stand. There were rumours that he would step aside if the party agreed to drop its ‘’Deux Nations’’ policy. He also told Roblin that he would lead a walkout from the convention if it were adopted. In the end, this policy was confirmed by the party’s Policy Committee, and Diefenbaker stayed at the convention. Several of the candidates went to Diefenbaker’s hotel suite to try to secure his support, but in the end he joined the race at the last minute.

Diefenbaker spoke to the convention as out-going leader, and only decided to make a speech as a candidate -- a few minutes before he scheduled to on stage -- at the urging of Erik Nielsen (Michael Starr’s campaign manager) and Joel Aldred. He spoke for only 8 of the 19 minutes he was allocated because he said that he did not want to gain an unfair advantage over other candidates by speaking to the convention twice in two days. He appealed to the party once more to reject deux nations. Half of the crowd rose to applaud his speech vigorously. This was the warmest reception received by any candidate.

Stanfield’s speech was well-crafted, but lacked the spark that had made his Tuesday evening speech so effective. Hees and Hamilton provided the best speeches of the evening, but by this point, the die was cast.

== The voting ==
Stanfield led on the first ballot, holding a solid, but far from decisive lead. Roblin was just barely ahead of Fulton in second place, with a clutch of other candidates following. Most significantly, Diefenbaker finished well off the pace in fifth place, effectively ending his chances of holding onto his position. Walker-Sawka was the first to be eliminated after getting just two votes, with MacLean faring little better and withdrawing through what he claimed to be a desire to keep the convention from "going too long." Neither of them endorsed any of the other candidates, though given the minuscule number of delegates they got, it would have made little difference if they did.

On the second ballot, Stanfield and Roblin were the only candidates to significantly increase their number of delegates, with the remaining candidates either holding steady or losing delegates, and most at the convention concluding that it was now essentially a two-horse race between the top two. What little support Diefenbaker still had collapsed on this ballot, with more than a third of his delegates deserting him, leaving it unlikely that he would even be able to act as kingmaker. Starr polled the fewest votes and was eliminated, with McCutcheon withdrawing and throwing his support behind Stanfield.

The gap between the top two, still Stanfield and Roblin, did not change on the third ballot. However, their support again increased noticeably, whereas Fulton's delegate count remained stagnant, ending any realistic hope of him winning the competition, as even if all the candidates who finished below were to endorse him, he could at best only hope to draw level with Roblin in the next round. Fleming finished last and was eliminated, and Diefenbaker experienced another collapse in support that left him with less half the number of delegates he started out with; knowing that he would likely be the next to be eliminated, and wanting to leave the contest on his own terms, Diefenbaker withdrew, bringing an end to what would ultimately prove the longest tenure of any Progressive Conservative leader. Hees also withdrew after his own delegate count slumped, and he and Fleming both endorsed Stanfield, with Diefenbaker instead endorsing Roblin (and in doing so, breaking the unofficial tradition that outgoing Tory leaders did not publicly endorse any of the contenders to succeed them, albeit none of the leaders prior to Diefenbaker had run to succeed themselves).

Though the fourth ballot still had Stanfield leading, Roblin was able to narrow the gap to the closest it had been percentage-wise throughout the contest. Hamilton, having hovered around near the bottom of the vote for the duration of the contest, was finally eliminated on this round, and did not endorse any of the other candidates. Fulton, whose vote had again remained static, knew that Hamilton's delegates would likely break evenly in favour of the two frontrunners, and that given he was certain to be eliminated in the next round and the gap between the remaining two was still narrow, he was now the kingmaker. He withdrew before the next ballot and ultimately chose to endorse Stanfield, effectively handing victory to the Nova Scotian, which was confirmed on the fifth and final ballot.

Delegate support by ballot
Candidate	1st ballot		2nd ballot		3rd ballot		4th ballot		5th ballot	
Candidate	Votes cast	%	Votes cast	%	Votes cast	%	Votes cast	%	Votes cast	%
STANFIELD, Robert Lorne	519	23.3%	613	27.7%	717	32.7%	865	40.1%	1,150	54.3%
ROBLIN, Dufferin (Duff)	347	15.6%	430	19.4%	541	24.7%	771	35.7%	969	45.7%
FULTON, Edmund Davie	343	15.4%	346	15.7%	361	16.5%	357	16.5%	Endorsed Stanfield	
HAMILTON, Francis Alvin George	136	6.1%	127	5.8%	106	4.8%	167	7.7%	Did not endorse	
HEES, George Harris	295	13.2%	299	13.5%	277	12.6%	Endorsed Stanfield			
DIEFENBAKER, John George	271	12.2%	172	7.8%	114	5.2%	Endorsed Roblin			
FLEMING, Donald Methuen	126	5.7%	115	5.2%	76	3.5%	Endorsed Stanfield			
MCCUTCHEON, Malcolm Wallace	137	6.1%	76	3.4%	Endorsed Stanfield					
STARR, Michael	45	2.0%	34	1.5%	Did not endorse					
MACLEAN, John	10	0.4%	Did not endorse							
WALKER-SAWKA, Mary	2	-	Did not endorse							
Total	2,231	100.0%	2,212	100.0%	2,192	100.0%	2,160	100.0%	2,119	100.0%

First round
Stanfield	23.26%
Roblin	15.55%
Fulton	15.37%
Hees	13.22%
Diefenbaker	12.15%
McCutcheon	6.14%
Hamilton	6.10%
Fleming	5.65%
Starr	2.02%
Maclean	0.45%
Walker-Sawka	0.09%

Second round
Stanfield	27.71%
Roblin	19.44%
Fulton	15.64%
Hees	13.52%
Diefenbaker	7.78%
Hamilton	5.74%
Fleming	5.20%
McCutcheon	3.44%
Starr	1.54%

Third round
Stanfield	32.71%
Roblin	24.68%
Fulton	16.47%
Hees	12.64%
Diefenbaker	5.20%
Hamilton	4.84%
Fleming	3.47%

Fourth round
Stanfield	40.05%
Roblin	35.69%
Fulton	16.53%
Hamilton	7.73%

Fifth round
Stanfield	54.27%
Roblin	45.73%

== Aftermath ==
After the fifth ballot, although he had been abandoned by his party, and his preferred candidate, Roblin, had been defeated, Diefenbaker returned to the convention, introduced by the convention chairperson as “the greatest Canadian of our century”. Diefenbaker welcomed his successor, Stanfield, and appealed to the party to give Stanfield their “undivided and unconditional loyalty”. Diefenbaker continued to sit as a Progressive Conservative Member of Parliament until his death in 1979.

Because Stanfield was not a Member of Parliament, Michael Starr, who was House Leader for the PC Party in the house of Commons, served as Leader of the Opposition until the 1968 election.

The election saw Fulton, Hamilton, and Starr all fail to be re-elected, while Roblin's attempt to move into federal politics also ended in failure. Diefenbaker successfully defended his Prince Albert seat, however, while Stanfield and Hees saw their previous ridings abolished, but succeeded in being elected in replacement ridings. Hamilton would later re-enter parliament at the 1972 election, while Roblin, after spending a decade focusing on his business interests, was appointed to the senate in 1978.

Stanfield became a well-respected figure in Canadian politics, but never became prime minister. He led the PC Party through three unsuccessful election campaigns against the Liberal Party of Pierre Trudeau in 1968, 1972, and 1974. He is often referred to as "the greatest Prime Minister Canada never had".

Sources: Toronto Star and The Globe and Mail newspapers, August–September 1967.

== See also ==
- Progressive Conservative leadership conventions
