= Mary Walker-Sawka =

Canadian politician

- Occupation: Film director

Mary Walker-Sawka (born c. 1916) was a Canadian film producer, who was the first woman ever to seek the leadership of a major federal political party in Canada. She was a surprise last-minute candidate at the 1967 leadership convention of the Progressive Conservative Party of Canada, a centre-right party that formed the official opposition in the House of Commons of Canada at the time. Unlike other leadership candidates, who had spent months campaigning, announcing policy positions and travelling across the country to meet delegates, Walker-Sawka announced and filed her candidacy just a few days before the convention began.

The convention had been called after a revolt by party members against the leadership of John Diefenbaker. Walker-Sawka said that she was a Diefenbaker supporter, but was running because she felt she could "add a few things" to Diefenbaker’s program. She gave a short speech setting out her ideas for PC party policy:

- Canada should withdraw from the North Atlantic Treaty Organization (NATO) and North American Aerospace Defense Command (NORAD);
- Canada should closely supervise its foreign aid programs to ensure that aid does not end up on the black market;
- all houses more than 20 or 30 years old should be torn down and re-built;
- Old Age Security payments should be increased to $100 per month;
- the education system should be modernized, and at least six languages should be taught in schools;
- the 11% federal sales tax should be eliminated.

She implored women to support her out of solidarity with her desire to advance women's equality in politics.

She was one of only three candidates, along with Michael Starr and Wallace McCutcheon, who did not include any French language comments in their speeches. The Globe and Mail reported that she "looked like a housewife who had mistakenly wandered on stage while looking for a bingo game". Walker-Sawka stated that as head of a film production company, she had never had time to be a housewife. She was nominated by her sole supporter, Marian Ray, but had no seconder. Some time passed before Barbara Wheeler, a delegate for George Hees, seconded Walker-Sawka's nomination in order to save her the embarrassment. Walker-Sawka won only two votes on the first ballot and was dropped from the ballot.

In November 1967 Walker-Sawka sent a telegram to federal cabinet minister Judy LaMarsh, lobbying to be appointed as head of the Canadian Broadcasting Corporation on the grounds that she had experience in film and television production, and was willing to do the job for "half the price" of outgoing president Alphonse Ouimet. She was not selected for the position. In December she was the only candidate from the September leadership contest who was not invited to take part in a party strategy session, because she could not bring any significant base of support and the party had doubts about how active and committed she was as a member.

She was a partner with her husband Paul Sawka in the film production company Palmar Productions. In 1968 Palmar Productions released its feature film The Man Who Wanted Nothing. Walker-Sawka was the film's director. The film, which Walker-Sawka described as a "metaphysical comedy", was submitted to the 20th Canadian Film Awards in 1968, but won no awards and never received any subsequent commercial distribution.
