= Federal minority governments in Canada =

Canadian political history

The House of Commons after the 2025 election, resulting in a third consecutive Liberal minority government until 2026, after the 2019 and 2021 elections (in red)

During the history of Canadian politics, several minority governments have been held office at the federal level.

In a minority situation, governments must rely on the support of MPs from other parties to stay in power, providing less stability than a majority government. At the federal level, no minority government has lasted a standard four-year term. Most minority governments have lasted less than two years.

Minority parliaments have become more common since the 1990s, with the rise of the Bloc Québécois making it more difficult for any party to win a majority government. Only two majority governments have been elected since 2004, in 2011 for the Conservative Party and 2015 for the Liberal Party.

The current 45th Parliament was in minority, with the Liberal Party under Mark Carney having led a minority government. That became the majority in 2026 after several non-Liberal members of Parliament crossed the floor. It was the third consecutive minority parliament, with the 2019, 2021, and 2025 elections all resulting in Liberal minority governments.

In the United Kingdom and elsewhere in the Commonwealth, parliaments without a single-party majority are referred to as hung parliaments, but this usage is uncommon in Canada.

== Alexander Mackenzie ==
Alexander Mackenzie replaced John A. Macdonald in 1873 after the latter was involved in the Pacific Scandal. Mackenzie became the prime minister of a minority government, but he immediately called an election in which he then won a majority.

== William Lyon Mackenzie King ==
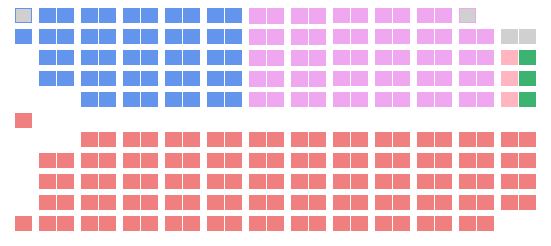
Liberal minority after the 1921 election

Liberal minority after the 1925 election

- Seats short of a majority 1921: 0. Term of office 3 years, 181 days (1,277 days). (Due to seat fluctuations, the government was not in a minority for the entire duration of the parliament.)
- Seats short of a majority 1925: 23. Term of office 208 days.

Liberal minority after the 1921 election. Initially, the Liberal Party had the exact number of seats required for a majority. It maintained that majority until December 1923 when it lost two seats in by-elections returning it to a minority. It continued as a minority until November 1924 when the Liberals gained a seat in a by-election and became a majority again. Therefore, although this particular Parliament lasted for 3 years and 7 months, for only about half of that time (one year and ten months) was it an actual minority Parliament.

Liberal minority after the 1925 election- This was a truly minority Parliament throughout its life. The election resulted in the incumbent Liberal government of Mackenzie King being reduced to 101 seats in the House of Commons, while the opposition Conservatives took the most seats (116). All others won 26 seats, 24 of them won by the Progressives. King chose to carry on in government and face the new Parliament seeking its confidence. From January to July 1926, King's government sustained such confidence with the support of most of the Progressives (although in many cases only by one or two votes). On June 26, after virtually losing control of the House and sustaining a loss on a sub-amendment to a censure motion and facing a final vote on the main censure motion, King asked the Governor-General for dissolution and was refused. King therefore immediately resigned and the Conservative leader Arthur Meighen agreed to form a government which itself, although larger, was also a minority one. However, a few days later on July 1, 1926, the new Meighen minority government was defeated on a matter of confidence (by one vote). Meighen then requested and obtained a dissolution from the Governor-General. Therefore, the Parliament arising from this election was throughout a minority one.

=== Quasi-minorities ===
After the 1926 election, the Liberal party proper was seven seats short of a majority. However, eight MPs were elected as Liberal-Progressive members and usually voted with the Liberals giving the government a working majority.

As well, following the 1945 election the official Liberal candidates did not win a majority of seats leaving the King government five seats short of a majority. However, the election of eight "Independent Liberal" MPs, most of whom did not run as official Liberals because of their opposition to conscription (see Conscription Crisis of 1944), as well as one Liberal-Progressive, gave the King government an effective working majority in parliament. Most of the Independent Liberal MPs joined (or re-joined) the Liberal caucus following World War II when the conscription issue became moot, formally moving King's government into majority.

== Arthur Meighen ==
Conservative^{1} minority after the 1925 election

- Seats short of a majority 1926: 8. Term of office 3 days.

Arthur Meighen led two short-lived Conservative governments. The first was a majority at the end of the 13th parliament, elected in 1917 under the Unionist ticket. The second government was a minority in 1926. Meighen's conservatives won a plurality of the seats in the previous 1925 election, however, a government was instead formed via an agreement between the Liberals and Progressives. After King's Liberals had lost the progressives' support he requested parliament to be dissolved by the governor-general, Lord Byng, resulting in the King–Byng Affair. The resulting conflict caused King to shortly resign as prime minister, and Byng subsequently appointed Meighen as prime minister. On July 1, 1926, a week after Byng appointed him prime minister, Meighen lost a confidence vote in the House of Commons resulting in the 1926 election.

^{1}Not elected as such

== John Diefenbaker ==
Tory minority after the 1957 election

Tory minority after the 1962 election

- Seats short of a majority 1957: 21. Term of office 110 days.
- Seats short of a majority 1962: 17. Term of office 132 days.

After 22 years of Liberal rule, the Progressive Conservative Party of Canada, led by John Diefenbaker, unexpectedly won a minority government in the 1957 election. Prime Minister Louis St. Laurent, sensing the mood of the nation, stepped aside and let Diefenbaker govern. Diefenbaker needed the support of the Social Credit Party of Canada and three independents to get any legislation passed. This minority lasted only a few months. The seminal moment was Lester Pearson announcing to Diefenbaker that because of the slight decline in economic performance, and the fact that the Liberals had won the popular vote, he should hand power back to the Liberals. Diefenbaker, in a rage, launched a two-hour speech condemning the Liberals, and revealing a document from the previous government predicting the economic decline. Diefenbaker would soon call an election, and win the largest majority government in Canadian history.

The Diefenbaker government ended badly with party infighting, a poor economy and controversies over relations with the United States during the Kennedy administration. In the 1962 election, the Tories won only a minority. This time, the momentum was with the Liberals and the imploding Tories were all but incapable of governing due largely to a split in Diefenbaker's Cabinet over the deployment of Bomarc missiles in Canada. The government was defeated in the House on a confidence issue on February 5, 1963, forcing the 1963 federal election which the Tories lost.

== Lester B. Pearson ==
Liberal minority after the 1963 election

Liberal minority after the 1965 election

- Seats short of a majority 1963: 5. Term of office 2 year, 115 days (846 days). Lester B. Pearson's Liberals won 128 seats, 5 seats away from a majority.
- Seats short of a majority 1965: 2. Term of office 2 years, 136 days (866 days). His party won 131 seats, 2 seats away from a majority.

In the 1963 election, the Liberals, led by Lester B. Pearson, were also unable to win a majority. The next 548 days were productive ones, however, a close working relationship between the Liberals and the New Democratic Party (NDP) resulted in the introduction of Canada's health care system, the Canadian flag, and the Canada Pension Plan. In 1965, Pearson asked the Governor General to dissolve Parliament in an attempt to win a majority, but the makeup of parliament after the 1965 election remained almost the same, leading to almost three more years of a productive alliance between the Liberals and NDP.

Canada's constitutional convention dealing with minority governments was altered in 1968 when Pearson's government was unexpectedly defeated on a matter of confidence. While this should have led to an immediate dissolution of parliament, none of the parties were ready, and Pearson was in the process of being replaced as leader of the Liberals. By mutual agreement among the party leaders, a new motion was passed that retroactively declared that the budgetary matter on which the government was defeated was not a matter of confidence, setting a new precedent. Pierre Trudeau succeeded Pearson as Liberal leader on April 6, 1968 and as prime minister on April 20. Trudeau led the Liberals to win a majority government in the resulting 1968 federal election.

== Pierre Trudeau ==
Liberal minority after the 1972 election

- Seats short of a majority 1972: 24^{2}. Term of office 1 year, 125 days (490 days).

In the 1972 election, the Liberals under Trudeau won only two seats more than the Tories. It was the second election for Trudeau as party leader. However, even though the Liberals entered the election strong in the polls, the Trudeaumania buzz had all but ended, and the party was further damaged by a weak economy. With few issues to campaign on and one of the weakest campaigns in Canadian history, they were again forced to rely on the NDP to remain in power. In this instance, the NDP demanded the creation of Petro-Canada among other things to support the Liberals. The government fell on May 8, 1974, on a sub-amendment to the budget (thus a question of confidence). The Trudeau Liberals won a large majority government in the resulting 1974 federal election.

^{2}Speaker was elected as independent

== Joe Clark ==
Tory minority after the 1979 election

- Seats short of a majority 1979: 6. Term of office 66 days.

To improve his situation slightly, Clark supported the selection of Liberal member James Jerome, House Speaker in the 30th Parliament, to serve as speaker once again, and this was seconded by Opposition Leader Pierre Trudeau. (Starting in 1986, the speaker was elected in a secret ballot vote by the members of the house.)

While the Liberals had first the Progressives and later the NDP to support them in minority situations, the Progressive Conservatives had little experience attracting support as a minority government. Seven months after the 1979 election which ended 11 years of Trudeau Liberal government, the Tory government of Joe Clark was defeated in motion of no confidence in the government and its budget moved by Bob Rae of the NDP and supported by the Liberals.

Clark might have prevented this defeat had his government agreed to support the Quebec based Social Credit Party in its bid to maintain official party status—the party's seat total had fallen to six seats as a result of the 1979 election. However, Clark had hoped to follow the precedent set by Diefenbaker and pledged to "govern as if" he had a majority and then advance to a majority government through a new election without having to make deals with smaller parties. He also wished to win seats in Quebec in his own right and saw the conservative, populist Social Credit Party as an obstacle rather than a potential partner. As a result of Clark's refusal to extend recognition to Social Credit, its MPs abstained in the Non-Confidence vote that brought down the Clark government on December 13, 1979, a defeat caused by the Social Credit abstention and the absence of a handful of Tory MPs due to illness or travel. The dissolution was portrayed as a blunder and the budget Clark fought 1980 election on was unpopular with voters. On February 18, 1980, the PCs were defeated by the Trudeau Liberals who were elected to a majority government.

== Paul Martin ==
Liberal minority after the 2004 election

- Seats short of a majority 2004: 20. Term of office 1 year, 56 days (421 days).

Although the 2004 federal election was initially expected to be easy for Martin to win a fourth consecutive Liberal majority government, during the campaign many began instead to predict a far closer result. Mostly due to the sponsorship scandal, polls started to indicate the possibility of a minority government for the Liberals, or even a minority Conservative government, which in turn created speculation of coalitions with the other parties. Towards the end of the campaign, the Liberals were running attack ads against the Conservatives. In the end, the Liberals fared better than the final opinion polls had led them to fear, but not well enough to win a majority.

On May 10, 2005, a motion was passed by the opposition parties in the House of Commons to instruct a committee to call for the dissolution of the government. The Conservatives and Bloc Québécois defeated the Liberals and the NDP by 153 votes to 150. Although the motion was technically nothing more than a procedural instruction to a committee, the Conservatives and Bloc demanded the resignation of the government. There is ongoing debate between parties and constitutional experts as to whether or not this was a vote of no confidence.

On May 19, 2005, the House voted on two budget bills, deemed unquestionable matters of confidence. With the support of two independents and Conservative MP Belinda Stronach—who crossed the floor to the Liberals and was appointed Minister of Human Resources and Skills Development, becoming a member of the Liberal cabinet—the result of the vote was a tie, which was broken in favour of the government by the Speaker of the House of Commons, resulting in a vote of 153–152.

On November 24, 2005, the opposition Conservatives introduced a motion of no confidence. The motion was seconded by the NDP. On November 28, the government was defeated by a margin of 171 to 133, having been defeated by the united opposition forces (Conservatives, NDP, and Bloc Québécois). In the early morning of November 29, 2005, Martin went to Governor General Michaëlle Jean to ask for the dissolution of parliament and a January 23, 2006, election.

== Stephen Harper ==
Conservative minority after the 2006 election

Conservative minority after the 2008 election

- Seats short of a majority 2006: 31. Term of office 2 years, 157 days (887 days).
- Seats short of a majority 2008: 12. Term of office 2 years, 128 days (858 days).

Although several public opinion polls predicted that the 2006 election would result in either a strong Conservative minority or a slight majority, the Liberals enjoyed a last-minute surge but were unable to overtake the Conservatives. However, the surge did result in the 2nd smallest minority government in Canadian history with the smallest percentage of government seats ever. All parties held the balance of power, the Liberal party with 102 seats, the Bloc Québécois with 51 seats, and the NDP with 29 seats. André Arthur, a popular radio host from Quebec City, was the only independent elected. As Liberal Peter Milliken was reelected as Speaker, the Conservatives now effectively held a minority only 29 seats short of a majority as the Speaker traditionally votes only to break a tie and always in favour of the status quo. Thus, the Conservatives held a majority together with any one of the opposition parties, assuming no defections. This status was changed midway through the 39th parliament when maverick MP Garth Turner was ousted from the Conservative caucus for allegedly violating "caucus confidentiality".

Stephen Harper led a minority Conservative government and was sworn in as Prime Minister on February 6. Paul Martin resigned as leader of the Liberal Party on March 18 to quell any rumours that he might run in any future election. From March 18 to December 2, 2006, Bill Graham was the interim leader of the Liberal party. Stéphane Dion won the leadership convention on December 2, and from then served as the leader of the opposition.

The initial results of the 2006 election indicated that the Conservatives would fall 31 seats short of a majority. However, after the election but before the new Parliament took office, Liberal David Emerson crossed the floor to join the Conservatives and Stephen Harper's cabinet amidst some controversy. This increased the size of the Conservative caucus to 125 seats, only 30 seats short of a majority.

The 39th Parliament was dissolved on September 7, 2008, ending the longest-running minority government between the return of writs and dissolution. On October 14, Harper's Conservative Party was re-elected with a plurality of seats, though still 12 seats short of a majority, and formed a second, but stronger minority government. It is the first time since Pearson's 1965 minority that a minority government was re-elected as such.

The 40th Parliament was dissolved following the government's defeat in a motion of no confidence, however, the Conservatives were re-elected to a majority government on May 2, 2011. Excluding the odd case of the 14th Parliament, Harper led the government through two longest-lasting federal minority governments in Canadian history and was also the first prime minister to win a federal election (by majority or minority) after winning two minority governments (consecutive or not).

== Justin Trudeau ==
Liberal minority after the 2019 election

Liberal minority after the 2021 election

- Seats short of a majority 2019: 13. Term of parliament 1 year, 253 days (619 days). Justin Trudeau's Liberals won 157 seats, 13 seats away from a majority.
- Seats short of a majority 2021: 10. Term of parliament 3 years, 121 days. (1217 days). His party won 160 seats, 10 seats away from a majority.

In the 2019 election, the Liberals under Trudeau won the most seats, though still 13 seats short of a majority, and formed a minority government.

The 43rd Parliament was dissolved on August 15, 2021. On September 20, Trudeau's Liberal Party was re-elected, though still 10 seats short of a majority, and formed a second, but slightly stronger minority government. It was the first time since Harper's 2008 minority that a minority government was re-elected as such. The New Democratic Party (NDP) agreed to a confidence and supply agreement with the Liberals from March 22, 2022, to September 4, 2024.

Trudeau had Parliament prorogued on January 6, 2025, and Mark Carney succeeded him as Liberal leader on March 9 and as prime minister on March 14. The 44th Parliament, still in prorogation, was dissolved on March 23.

== Mark Carney ==
Liberal minority until 2026 after the 2025 election

- Seats short of a majority 2025: 3. Term of office 317 days.

Carney led the Liberals to win a stronger minority government in the resulting 2025 federal election. His Liberals won 169 seats, three short of a majority. Since the election, four Conservative and one New Democratic MPs have crossed the floor to join the Liberal caucus. This led to the party achieving a majority government within the life of the 45th Parliament.

== Minority governments by term of office ==
Rank	Prime Minister	Party	Parliament	Seats (Minority size at start)	Seats (Minority size at end of term)	Year(s)	Duration from the first session to dissolution	Notes
1	William Lyon Mackenzie King	█ Liberal	14th	116 of 235 (2 short)		1922–1925	3 years, 181 days (Note: Only a minority parliament for approximately 1 year, 2 months.)	Due to resignations and floor crossing, the 14th Parliament shifted back and forth between majority and minority status.
2	Justin Trudeau (Note: 3 years, 112 days) & Mark Carney (Note: 9 days)	█ Liberal	44th	160 of 338 (10 short)	152 of 338 (18 short)	2021–2025	3 years, 121 days	Justin Trudeau's government was supported by the New Democratic Party in a Confidence and supply agreement from March 22, 2022, to September 4, 2024.
3	Stephen Harper	█ Conservative	39th	124 of 308 (31 short)	127 of 308 (28 short)	2006–2008	2 years, 207 days	
4	Lester B. Pearson (Note: 2 years, 133 days) & Pierre Trudeau (Note: 3 days)	█ Liberal	27th	131 of 265 (2 short)	128 of 265 (5 short)	1965–1968	2 years, 136 days	
5	Stephen Harper	█ Conservative	40th	143 of 308 (12 short)	143 of 308 (12 short)	2008–2011	2 years, 128 days	
6	Lester B. Pearson	█ Liberal	26th	128 of 265 (5 short)	128 of 265 (5 short)	1963–1965	2 years, 115 days	
7	Justin Trudeau	█ Liberal	43rd	157 of 338 (13 short)	155 of 338 (15 short)	2019–2021	1 year, 253 days	
8	Pierre Trudeau	█ Liberal	29th	109 of 264 (24 short)	109 of 264 (24 short)	1972–1974	1 year, 125 days	
9	Paul Martin	█ Liberal	38th	135 of 308 (20 short)	133 of 308 (22 short)	2004–2006	1 year, 56 days	
10	Mark Carney (incumbent)	█ Liberal	45th	169 of 343 (3 short)		2025–2026	343 days (Note: Only a minority parliament for 317 days.)	After a fifth opposition MP crossed the floor on April 8, 2026, the Liberals achieved a majority government.
11	William Lyon Mackenzie King	█ Liberal	15th	99 of 245 (24 short)		1925–1926	208 days	
12	John Diefenbaker	█ Progressive Conservative	25th	116 of 265 (17 short)		1962–1963	132 days	
13	John Diefenbaker	█ Progressive Conservative	23rd	112 of 265 (21 short)		1957–1958	110 days	
14	Joe Clark	█ Progressive Conservative	31st	136 of 282 (6 short)	136 of 282 (6 short)	1979–1980	66 days	
15	Alexander Mackenzie	█ Liberal	2nd	95 of 200 (5 short)		1873–1874	56 days	Mackenzie's government replaced Macdonald's government in the 2nd Parliament without an election. For more information, see Pacific Scandal.
16	Arthur Meighen	█ Conservative	15th	115 of 245 (8 short)		1926	3 days	Meighen's government replaced King's government in the 15th Parliament without an election. For more information, see King–Byng Affair.

== See also ==
- Minority governments in Canada, for a list of provincial minority governments in Canada.

== Bibliography ==
- Canada. "Key Dates for each Parliament". Library of Parliament. Archived from the original on September 14, 2005.
- Canada. "Duration of Minority Governments". Library of Parliament. Archived from the original on May 7, 2013.
- Minority Government, by Stephen Azzi, D. Kwavnick
