= 3rd Saskatchewan Legislature =

The 3rd Legislative Assembly of Saskatchewan was elected in the Saskatchewan general election held in July 1912. The assembly sat from November 14, 1912, to June 2, 1917. The Liberal Party led by Walter Scott formed the government. Scott resigned as premier on October 16, 1916, and was succeeded by William Melville Martin. The Conservative Party of Saskatchewan led by Wellington Willoughby formed the official opposition.

John Albert Sheppard served as speaker for the assembly until October 1916. Robert Menzies Mitchell became speaker in 1917.

== Members of the Assembly ==
The following members were elected to the assembly in 1912:

Electoral district	Member	Party	First elected / previously elected	No.# of term(s)
Arm River	George Adam Scott	Liberal	1908	2nd term
Athabasca	Joseph Octave Nolin	Liberal	1908	2nd term
Battleford	Sydney Seymour Simpson	Liberal	1908	2nd term
Biggar	Charles Henry Cawthorpe	Liberal	1912	1st term
Cannington	John Duncan Stewart	Liberal	1905	3rd term
Canora	John Duff Robertson	Liberal	1908	2nd term
Cumberland	(Election declared void; see by-election Sept. 8, 1913)	n/a		
Cumberland	Deakin Hall (1913)	Liberal	1913	1st term
Eagle Creek	George Hamilton Harris	Liberal	1912	1st term
Estevan	George Alexander Bell	Liberal	1908	2nd term
Francis	Walter George Robinson	Liberal	1912	1st term
Gull Lake	Daniel Cameron Lochead	Liberal	1912	1st term
Hanley	James Walter MacNeill	Liberal	1908	2nd term
Hanley	Macbeth Malcolm (1913)	Liberal	1913	1st term
Humboldt	William Ferdinand Alphonse Turgeon	Liberal	1907	3rd term
Kerrobert	George Harvey Watson	Liberal	1912	1st term
Kindersley	William Richard Motherwell	Liberal	1905, (Note: North Qu'Appelle) 1908	3rd term*
Kinistino	Edward Haywood Devline	Liberal	1912	1st term
Kinistino	Charles Avery Dunning (1916)	Liberal	1916	1st term
Last Mountain	Samuel John Latta	Liberal	1912	1st term
Lloydminster	John Percival Lyle	Liberal	1912	1st term
Lumsden	Frederick Clarke Tate	Conservative	1912	1st term
Maple Creek	David James Wylie	Conservative	1905	3rd term
Melfort	George Balfour Johnston	Liberal	1908	2nd term
Milestone	Bernard Larson	Liberal	1912	1st term
Moose Jaw City	Wellington Bartley Willoughby	Conservative	1912	1st term
Moose Jaw County	John Albert Sheppard	Liberal	1905	3rd term
Moose Jaw County	John Edwin Chisholm (1916)	Conservative	1916	1st term
Moose Mountain	Robert Armstrong Magee	Liberal	1912	1st term
Moosomin	Alexander Smith Smith	Liberal	1908	2nd term
Morse	Malcolm L. Leitch	Liberal	1912	1st term
North Battleford	Donald M. Finlayson	Liberal	1908	2nd term
North Qu'Appelle	John Archibald McDonald	Conservative	1908	2nd term
North Qu'Appelle	James Garfield Gardiner (1914)	Liberal	1914	1st term
Pelly	John Kenneth Johnston	Liberal	1908	2nd term
Pheasant Hills	Andrew Benjamin Alton Cunningham	Liberal	1912	1st term
Pinto Creek	Samuel Robert Moore	Liberal	1912	1st term
Pipestone	Richard James Phin	Liberal	1912	1st term
Prince Albert City	John Ernest Bradshaw	Conservative	1908	2nd term
Quill Plains	Wilhelm Hans Paulson	Liberal	1912	1st term
Redberry	George Langley	Liberal	1905	3rd term
Regina City	James Franklin Bole	Liberal	1905	3rd term
Regina City	William Melville Martin (1916)	Liberal	1916	1st term
Rosetown	Cephas Barker Mark	Liberal	1912	1st term
Rosthern	Gerhard Ens	Liberal	1905	3rd term
Rosthern	William Benjamin Bashford (1914)	Liberal	1914	1st term
Saltcoats	James Alexander Calder	Liberal	1905, (Note: South Regina) 1908	3rd term*
Saskatoon City	Archibald Peter McNab	Liberal	1908	2nd term
Saskatoon County	William Charles Sutherland	Liberal	1905	3rd term
Shellbrook	Samuel James Donaldson	Conservative	1907	3rd term
Shellbrook	Edgar Clinch (1915)	Liberal	1915	1st term
Souris	Richard Forsyth	Liberal	1912	1st term
South Qu'Appelle	Frederick William Gordon Haultain	Conservative	1905	3rd term
South Qu'Appelle	Joseph Glenn (1912)	Conservative	1912	1st term
Swift Current	Walter Scott	Liberal	1905	3rd term
Thunder Creek	Alexandre Beaudreau	Liberal	1912	1st term
Touchwood	George Maitland Atkinson	Liberal	1908	2nd term
Tramping Lake	James Murray Scott	Liberal	1912	1st term
Vonda	Albert Frederick Totzke	Liberal	1908	2nd term
Wadena	Herbert Chandler Pierce	Liberal	1908	2nd term
Weyburn	Robert Menzies Mitchell	Liberal	1908	2nd term
Willow Bunch	William W. Davidson	Conservative	1912	1st term
Yorkton	Thomas Henry Garry	Liberal	1905	3rd term

== Party Standings ==
Affiliation	Members
Liberal	45
Conservative	8
Total	53 (Note: The election held in Cumberland was declared void; a by-election was held there in September 1913.)
Government Majority	37

== By-elections ==
By-elections were held to replace members for various reasons:

Electoral district	Member elected	Party	Election date	Reason
Estevan	George Alexander Bell	Liberal	September 5, 1912	Bell ran for reelection after being named to cabinet
Redberry	George Langley	Liberal	September 5, 1912	Langley ran for reelection after being named to cabinet
South Qu'Appelle	Joseph Glenn	Conservative	December 4, 1912	Frederick W.A.G. Haultain named Chief Justice of the Superior Court of Saskatchewan
Hanley	Macbeth Malcolm	Liberal	June 28, 1913	James Walter MacNeill resigned to travel abroad and study mental diseases
Cumberland	Deakin Alexander Hall	Liberal	September 8, 1913	Election in 1912 declared void
North Qu'Appelle	James Garfield Gardiner	Liberal	June 25, 1914	JA McDonald resigned from the assembly in 1914 after admitting to "corrupt practices on the part of his agent" during the 1912 election
Rosthern	William Benjamin Bashford	Liberal	June 25, 1914	Gerhard Ens resigned his seat in the assembly in 1913 when he was named Inspector of Public Institutions
Shellbrook	Edgar Sidney Clinch	Liberal	May 10, 1915	Samuel James Donaldson ran for House of Commons seat
Kinistino	Charles Avery Dunning	Liberal	November 13, 1916	EH Devline convicted of forgery and sent to prison
Regina City	William Melville Martin	Liberal	November 13, 1916	James Franklin Bole named Saskatchewan liquor commissioner
Moose Jaw County	John Edwin Chisholm	Conservative	December 5, 1916	Election requested by JA Sheppard to "give him the opportunity of vindicating his character by an appeal to the people"
