= 4th Saskatchewan Legislature =

The 4th Legislative Assembly of Saskatchewan was elected in the Saskatchewan general election held in June 1917. The assembly sat from November 13, 1917, to May 16, 1921. The Liberal Party led by William Melville Martin formed the government. The Conservative Party of Saskatchewan led by Donald Maclean formed the official opposition. Wellington Willoughby had resigned from the assembly shortly after the election.

Robert Menzies Mitchell served as speaker for the assembly until May 1919. George Adam Scott succeeded Mitchell as speaker.

== Members of the Assembly ==
The following members were elected to the assembly in 1917:

Electoral district	Member	Party	First elected / previously elected	No.# of term(s)
Arm River	George Adam Scott	Liberal	1908	3rd term
Bengough	Thomas Evan Gamble	Liberal	1917	1st term
Biggar	George Hamilton Harris	Liberal	1912	2nd term
Cannington	John Duncan Stewart	Liberal	1905	4th term
Canora	H.P. Albert Hermanson	Liberal	1912	2nd term
Cumberland	Deakin Alexander Hall	Liberal	1913	2nd term
Cut Knife	William Hamilton Dodds	Liberal	1917	1st term
Cypress	Isaac Stirling	Liberal	1917	1st term
Elrose	Archibald Peter McNab	Liberal	1908	3rd term
Estevan	George Alexander Bell	Liberal	1908	3rd term
Estevan	Robert Dunbar (1918)	Liberal	1918	1st term
Francis	Walter George Robinson	Liberal	1912	2nd term
Hanley	Macbeth Malcolm	Liberal	1913	2nd term
Happyland	Stephen Morrey	Liberal	1917	1st term
Humboldt	William Ferdinand Alphonse Turgeon	Liberal	1907	4th term
Île-à-la-Crosse	Joseph Octave Nolin	Liberal	1908	3rd term
Jack Fish Lake	Donald M. Finlayson	Liberal	1908	3rd term
Kerrobert	John Albert Dowd	Liberal	1917	1st term
Kindersley	William Richard Motherwell	Liberal	1905, (Note: North Qu'Appelle) 1908	4th term
Kindersley	Wesley Harper Harvey (1919)	Independent Farmer	1919	1st term
Kinistino	John Richard Parish Taylor	Liberal	1917	1st term
Last Mountain	Samuel John Latta	Liberal	1912	2nd term
Lloydminster	Robert James Gordon	Liberal	1917	1st term
Lumsden	William John Vancise	Liberal	1917	1st term
Maple Creek	Alexander John Colquhoun	Liberal	1917	1st term
Melfort	George Balfour Johnston	Liberal	1908	3rd term
Milestone	Bernard Larson	Liberal	1912	2nd term
Moose Jaw City	Wellington Bartley Willoughby	Conservative	1912	2nd term
Moose Jaw City	William Erskine Knowles (1918)	Liberal	1918	1st term
Moose Jaw County	Charles Avery Dunning	Liberal	1916	2nd term
Moose Mountain	Robert Armstrong Magee	Liberal	1912	2nd term
Moosomin	John Louis Salkeld	Conservative	1917	1st term
Morse	Malcolm L. Leitch	Liberal	1912	2nd term
North Qu'Appelle	James Garfield Gardiner	Liberal	1914	2nd term
Notukeu	George Spence	Liberal	1917	1st term
Pelly	Magnus O. Ramsland	Liberal	1917	1st term
Pelly	Sarah Ramsland (1919)	Liberal	1919	1st term
Pheasant Hills	James Arthur Smith	Liberal	1917	1st term
Pipestone	Richard James Phin	Liberal	1912	2nd term
Prince Albert	Charles M. McDonald	Liberal	1917	1st term
Redberry	George Langley	Liberal	1905	4th term
Regina City	William Melville Martin	Liberal	1916	2nd term
Rosetown	William Thompson Badger	Conservative	1917	1st term
Rosthern	William Benjamin Bashford	Liberal	1914	2nd term
Saltcoats	James Alexander Calder	Liberal	1905, (Note: South Regina) 1908	4th term*
Saltcoats	George Sahlmark (1918)	Liberal	1918	1st term
Saskatoon City	Donald Maclean	Conservative	1917	1st term
Saskatoon County	Murdo Cameron	Liberal	1917	1st term
Shellbrook	Edgar Sidney Clinch	Liberal	1915	2nd term
Souris	William Oliver Fraser	Conservative	1917	1st term
South Qu'Appelle	Joseph Glenn	Conservative	1912	2nd term
Swift Current	David John Sykes	Independent	1917	1st term
The Battlefords	Allan Demetrius Pickel	Liberal	1917	1st term
Thunder Creek	Andrew Dunn Gallaugher	Conservative	1917	1st term
Tisdale	Hugh Evan Jones	Liberal	1917	1st term
Touchwood	John Mason Parker	Liberal	1917	1st term
Turtleford	Archibald B. Gemmell	Liberal	1917	1st term
Vonda	James Hogan	Liberal	1917	1st term
Wadena	John Angus MacMillan	Liberal	1917	1st term
Weyburn	Robert Menzies Mitchell	Liberal	1908	3rd term
Weyburn	Charles McGill Hamilton (1919)	Liberal	1919	1st term
Wilkie	Reuben Martin	Liberal	1917	1st term
Willow Bunch	Abel James Hindle	Liberal	1917	1st term
Wynyard	Wilhelm Hans Paulson	Liberal	1912	2nd term
Yorkton	Thomas Henry Garry	Liberal	1905	4th term
France (Note: Active service vote)	Private Harris Turner		1917	1st term
Belgium	Captain Frederick Bagshaw		1917	1st term
Great Britain	Lt. Col. James Albert Cross		1917	1st term

== Party Standings ==
Affiliation	Members
Liberal	51
Conservative Party of Saskatchewan	7
Independent	1
Active service vote (Note: Represented soldiers serving overseas in the province at large.)	3
Total	62
Government Majority	40

== By-elections ==
By-elections were held to replace members for various reasons:

Electoral district	Member elected	Party	Election date	Reason
Last Mountain	Samuel John Latta	Liberal	November 6, 1917	Latta ran for reelection after being named to cabinet
Moose Jaw City	William Erskine Knowles	Liberal	June 10, 1918	Knowles ran for reelection after being named to cabinet
Saltcoats	George William Sahlmark	Liberal	July 11, 1918	James Alexander Calder ran for House of Commons seat
Estevan	Robert Dunbar	Liberal	October 24, 1918	George Alexander Bell resigned seat
Weyburn	Charles McGill Hamilton	Liberal	July 22, 1919	R M Mitchell named superintendent for provincial mental hospital
Pelly	Sarah Katherine Ramsland (Note: First woman elected to the Legislative Assembly of Saskatchewan)	Liberal	July 29, 1919	Max Ramsland, her husband, died November 1918
Kindersley	Wesley Harper Harvey	Independent Farmer	November 15, 1919	William Richard Motherwell resigned to protest provincial Liberals support for conscription
Weyburn	Charles McGill Hamilton	Liberal	June 15, 1920	Hamilton ran for reelection after being named to cabinet
