= 1912 Saskatchewan general election =

Canadian provincial election

← 1908	July 11, 1912	1917 →

54 seats in the Legislative Assembly of Saskatchewan 28 seats needed for a majority
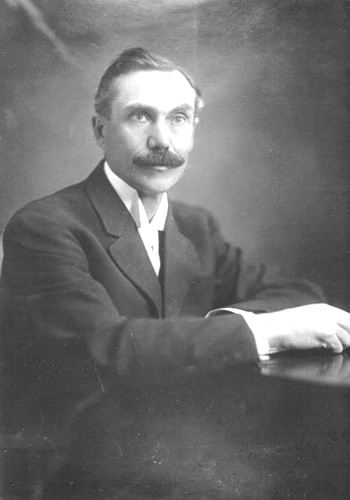
	First party	Second party
		CON
Leader	Thomas Walter Scott	Wellington Willoughby
Party	Liberal	Conservative
Leader since	August 16, 1905	1912
Leader's seat	Swift Current	Moose Jaw City
Last election	27	14
Seats won	45	8
Seat change	▲18	▼6
Popular vote	50,004	36,848
Percentage	57.0%	42.0%
Swing	▲6.2pp	▼5.9pp
Premier before election
Thomas Walter Scott
Liberal
Premier after election
Thomas Walter Scott
Liberal

The 1912 Saskatchewan general election was held on July 11, 1912 to elect members of the Legislative Assembly of Saskatchewan. Premier Walter Scott led the Liberal Party of Saskatchewan to a third term in office with a significant increase in the share of the popular vote. The opposition, now renamed from the Provincial Rights Party to the Conservative Party of Saskatchewan and led by Wellington Bartley Willoughby, lost both votes and seats in the legislature.

== Results ==
Party	Party Leader	Candidates	Seats			Popular Vote		
Party	Party Leader	Candidates	1908	Elected	Change	Votes	%	Change
Liberal	Walter Scott	53	27	45	+60.0%	50,004	56.96%	+6.17%
Conservative^{1}	Wellington Willoughby	53	14	8	-42.9%	36,848	41.98%	-5.90%
Independent		5	–	-	-	934	1.06%	+0.40%
Total		111	41	53^{2}	+29.3%	87,786	100%	N/A
Source: Elections Saskatchewan

Notes:

- ^{1} Results compared to those of Provincial Rights Party in 1908 election, which became the Conservative Party.
- ^{2} There were 54 seats contested at the 1912 election, however Cumberland was declared void and only 53 people were elected. A by-election was held on September 8, 1913 to fill the vacancy that existed in Cumberland.

Popular vote
Liberal	56.96%
Conservative	41.98%
Others	1.06%

Seats summary
Liberal	85.19%
Conservative	14.81%

== Members of the Legislative Assembly elected ==
For complete electoral history, see individual districts

3rd Saskatchewan Legislative Assembly
District	Member	Party
Arm River	George A. Scott	Liberal
Athabasca	Joseph Nolin	Liberal
Battleford	Sydney Simpson	Liberal
Biggar	Charles Cawthorpe	Liberal
Cannington	John D. Stewart	Liberal
Canora	John D. Robertson	Liberal
Cumberland	(void)	n/a
Eagle Creek	George Harris	Liberal
Estevan	George Bell	Liberal
Francis	Walter Robinson	Liberal
Gull Lake	Daniel C. Lochead	Liberal
Hanley	James MacNeill	Liberal
Humboldt	William Turgeon	Liberal
Kerrobert	George Watson	Liberal
Kindersley	William R. Motherwell	Liberal
Kinistino	Edward Devline	Liberal
Last Mountain	Samuel Latta	Liberal
Lloydminster	John Lyle	Liberal
Lumsden	Frederick Tate	Conservative
Maple Creek	David Wylie	Conservative
Melfort	George B. Johnston	Liberal
Milestone	Bernard Larson	Liberal
Moose Jaw City	Wellington Willoughby	Conservative
Moose Jaw County	John Sheppard	Liberal
Moose Mountain	Robert Magee	Liberal
Moosomin	Alexander S. Smith	Liberal
Morse	Malcolm L. Leitch	Liberal
North Battleford	Donald Finlayson	Liberal
North Qu'Appelle	John Archibald McDonald	Conservative
Pelly	John K. Johnston	Liberal
Pheasant Hills	Andrew Benjamin Cunningham	Liberal
Pinto Creek	Samuel Moore	Liberal
Pipestone	Richard Phin	Liberal
Prince Albert City	John E. Bradshaw	Conservative
Quill Plains	Wilhelm Paulson	Liberal
Redberry	George Langley	Liberal
Regina City	James Bole	Liberal
Rosetown	Cephas Mark	Liberal
Rosthern	Gerhard Ens	Liberal
Saltcoats	James Alexander Calder	Liberal
Saskatoon City	Archibald McNab	Liberal
Saskatoon County	William C. Sutherland	Liberal
Shellbrook	Samuel J. Donaldson	Conservative
Souris	Richard Forsyth	Liberal
South Qu'Appelle	Frederick Haultain	Conservative
Swift Current	Walter Scott	Liberal
Thunder Creek	Alexandre Beaudreau	Liberal
Touchwood	George Atkinson	Liberal
Trampling Lake	James M. Scott	Liberal
Vonda	Albert Totzke	Liberal
Wadena	Herbert Pierce	Liberal
Weyburn	Robert Mitchell	Liberal
Willow Bunch	William W. Davidson	Conservative
Yorkton	Thomas Garry	Liberal

=== By-election, September 8, 1913 ===
District	Member	Party
Cumberland	Deakin Alexander Hall	Liberal

== See also ==
- List of political parties in Saskatchewan
- List of Saskatchewan provincial electoral districts
