= 6th Saskatchewan Legislature =

The 6th Legislative Assembly of Saskatchewan was elected in the Saskatchewan general election held in June 1925. The assembly sat from December 3, 1925, to May 11, 1929. The Liberal Party led by Charles Avery Dunning formed the government. After Dunning entered federal politics in 1926, James Garfield Gardiner became Liberal party leader and Premier. Charles Tran, the leader of the Progressive Party, and James Thomas Milton Anderson, the leader of the Conservative Party, shared the role of opposition leader in the assembly.

Walter George Robinson served as speaker for the assembly.

== Members of the Assembly ==
The following members were elected to the assembly in 1925:

Electoral district	Member	Party	First elected / previously elected	No.# of term(s)
Arm River	George Adam Scott	Liberal	1908	5th term
Arm River	Thomas Frederick Waugh (1928)	Liberal	1928	1st term
Bengough	Thomas Evan Gamble	Liberal	1917	3rd term
Biggar	Robert Pelham Hassard	Liberal	1925	1st term
Cannington	Albert Edward Steele	Liberal	1924	2nd term
Canora	Joseph Albert McClure	Progressive	1925	1st term
Cumberland (Note: Election was held on July 21, 1925)	Deakin Alexander Hall	Liberal	1913, 1922	4th term*
Cut Knife	William Hamilton Dodds	Liberal	1917	3rd term
Cypress	Henry Theodore Halvorson	Liberal	1921	2nd term
Elrose	Wilbert Hagarty	Liberal	1921	2nd term
Estevan	James Forbes Creighton	Independent	1925	1st term
Francis	Walter George Robinson	Liberal	1912	4th term
Gravelbourg	Benjamin Franklin McGregor	Liberal	1925	1st term
Hanley	Reginald Stipe	Progressive	1925	1st term
Happyland	John Joseph Keelan	Liberal	1925	1st term
Humboldt	Henry Mathies Therres	Independent Liberal	1921	2nd term
Île-à-la-Crosse	Joseph Octave Nolin	Liberal	1908	5th term
Île-à-la-Crosse	Jules Marion (1926)	Liberal	1926	1st term
Jack Fish Lake	Donald M. Finlayson	Liberal	1908	5th term
Kerrobert	John Albert Dowd	Liberal	1917	3rd term
Kerrobert	Donald Laing (1926)	Liberal	1926	1st term
Kindersley	Ebenezer Samuel Whatley	Progressive	1925	1st term
Kinistino	Charles McIntosh	Liberal	1925	1st term
Last Mountain	Samuel John Latta	Liberal	1912	4th term
Lloydminster	Robert James Gordon	Liberal	1917	3rd term
Lumsden	Hugh Kerr Miller	Liberal	1925	1st term
Maple Creek	Peter Lawrence Hyde	Liberal	1921	2nd term
Maple Creek	George Spence (1927)	Liberal	1917, (Note: Notukeu) 1927	4th term*
Melfort	Olin Drake Hill	Liberal	1921	2nd term
Milestone	Frederick Birthall Lewis	Liberal	1923	2nd term
Moose Jaw City	William George Baker	Labour-Liberal	1921	2nd term
Moose Jaw City	William Erskine Knowles	Liberal	1918, 1925	2nd term*
Moose Jaw City	William Gladstone Ross (1927)	Liberal	1927	1st term
Moose Jaw County	Charles Avery Dunning	Liberal	1916	4th term
Moose Jaw County	Thomas Waddell (1926)	Liberal	1926	1st term
Moosomin	John Louis Salkeld	Independent	1917	3rd term
Morse	William Paris MacLachlan	Liberal	1925	1st term
Morse	William Gladstone Ross (1927)	Liberal	1927	1st term
North Qu'Appelle	James Garfield Gardiner	Liberal	1914	4th term
Notukeu	George Spence	Liberal	1917	3rd term
Notukeu	Alexander Lothian Grant (1926)	Liberal	1926	1st term
Pelly	Charles Tran	Progressive	1925	1st term
Pheasant Hills	James Arthur Smith	Liberal	1917	3rd term
Pipestone	William John Patterson	Liberal	1921	2nd term
Prince Albert	Thomas Clayton Davis	Liberal	1925	1st term
Redberry	George Cockburn	Progressive	1921	2nd term
Redberry	George Cockburn	Liberal	1921	2nd term
Regina City	Donald Alexander McNiven	Liberal	1922	2nd term
Regina City	Murdoch Alexander MacPherson	Conservative	1925	1st term
Rosetown	John Andrew Wilson	Liberal	1921	2nd term
Rosthern	John Michael Uhrich	Liberal	1921	2nd term
Saltcoats	George William Sahlmark	Liberal	1918	3rd term
Saskatoon City	Archibald Peter McNab	Liberal	1908	5th term
Saskatoon City	James Thomas Milton Anderson	Conservative	1925	1st term
Saskatoon City	Howard McConnell (1927)	Conservative	1927	1st term
Saskatoon County	Charles Agar	Progressive	1921	2nd term
Saskatoon County	Charles Agar	Liberal	1921	2nd term
Shellbrook	Edgar Sidney Clinch	Liberal	1915	4th term
Souris	Jesse Pichard Tripp	Liberal	1925	1st term
South Qu'Appelle	Anton Huck	Liberal	1925	1st term
Swift Current	David John Sykes	Liberal	1917	3rd term
The Battlefords	Allan Demetrius Pickel	Liberal	1917	3rd term
Thunder Creek	Robert Scott Donaldson	Liberal	1925	1st term
Tisdale	Walter Clutterbuck Buckle	Conservative	1925	1st term
Touchwood	John Mason Parker	Liberal	1917	3rd term
Turtleford	Archibald B. Gemmell	Liberal	1917	3rd term
Vonda	James Hogan	Liberal	1917	3rd term
Wadena	William Henry McKinnon	Liberal	1921	2nd term
Weyburn	Charles McGill Hamilton	Liberal	1919	3rd term
Wilkie	Robert Erie Nay	Liberal	1925	1st term
Willow Bunch	Abel James Hindle	Liberal	1917	3rd term
Willow Bunch	James Albert Cross	Liberal	1917, 1925	3rd term*
Wolseley	Thomas McAfee	Liberal	1925	1st term
Wynyard	Wilhelm Hans Paulson	Liberal	1912, 1924	4th term*
Yorkton	Thomas Henry Garry	Liberal	1905	6th term

== Party Standings ==
Affiliation	Members
Liberal	50
Progressive	6
Conservative Party of Saskatchewan	3
Independent	2
Independent Liberal-Labour	1
Independent Liberal	1
Total	63
Government Majority	37

== By-elections ==
By-elections were held to replace members for various reasons:

Electoral district	Member elected	Party	Election date	Reason
Willow Bunch	James Albert Cross	Liberal	August 31, 1925	A Hindle resigned seat to allow Cross to be elected to assembly
Pipestone	William John Patterson	Liberal	March 18, 1926	WJ Patterson ran for reelection after being named to cabinet
Prince Albert	Thomas Clayton Davis	Liberal	March 18, 1926	TC Davis ran for reelection after being named to cabinet
Île-à-la-Crosse	A. Jules Marion	Liberal	April 26, 1926	JO Nolin died in office in December 1925
Moose Jaw County	Thomas Waddell	Liberal	May 25, 1926	CA Dunning ran for federal seat
Notukeu	Alexander Lothian Grant	Liberal	June 1, 1926	G Spence ran for federal seat
Kerrobert	Donald Laing	Liberal	November 9, 1926	JA Dowd resigned seat
Saskatoon City	Howard McConnell	Conservative	January 21, 1927	AP McNab named to local government board
Moose Jaw City	William Gladstone Ross	Liberal	May 17, 1927	WE Knowles named to bench
Morse	Duncan Morris Robertson	Liberal	August 15, 1927	WP MacLachlan died in office
Maple Creek	George Spence	Liberal	December 1, 1927	PL Hyde resigned seat
Arm River	Thomas Frederick Waugh	Liberal	October 25, 1928	GA Scott resigned after being named income tax inspector
