= 1908 Saskatchewan general election =

Canadian provincial election in 1908

- August 14, 1908

41 seats in the Legislative Assembly of Saskatchewan 21 seats needed for a majority
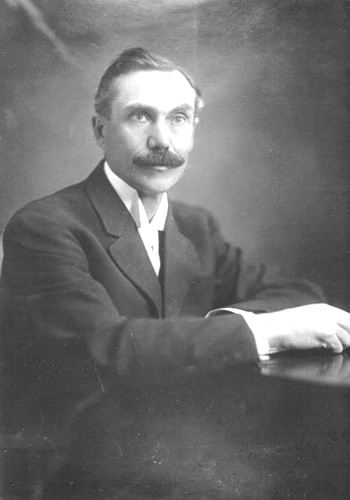

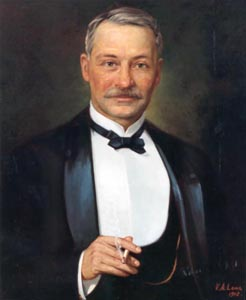
	First party	Second party
Leader	Thomas Walter Scott	Frederick W. A. G. Haultain
Party	Liberal	Provincial Rights
Leader since	August 16, 1905	August 23, 1905
Leader's seat	Swift Current	South Qu'Appelle
Last election	16	9
Seats won	27	14
Seat change	▲9	▲5
Popular vote	29,807	28,099
Percentage	50.8%	47.9%
Swing	▼1.5pp	▲0.4pp
Premier before election
Thomas Walter Scott
Liberal
Premier after election
Thomas Walter Scott
Liberal

The 1908 Saskatchewan general election was held on August 14, 1908 to elect members of the Legislative Assembly of Saskatchewan. Premier Walter Scott and his Liberal Party were re-elected for a second term, defeating the Provincial Rights Party of Frederick W. A. G. Haultain.

Party	Party Leader	# of candidates	Seats			Popular Vote		
Party	Party Leader	# of candidates	1905	Elected	% Change	#	%	% Change
Liberal	Walter Scott	40/41^{1}	16	27	+68.8%	29,807	50.79%	-1.46%
Provincial Rights	Frederick Haultain	40	9	14	+55.6%	28,099	47.88%	+0.41%
Independent-Liberal		1	–	–	–	394	0.67%	
Independent		2	–	–	–	387	0.66%	+0.38%
Total		83/84	25	41	+16%	58,687	100%	
Source: Elections Saskatchewan

Note:

1. William Turgeon ran in two ridings, in Duck Lake he won and in Prince Albert City where he lost.

Popular vote
Liberal	50.79%
Provincial Rights	47.88%
Others	1.33%

Seats summary
Liberal	65.85%
Provincial Rights	34.15%

== Members of the Legislative Assembly elected ==
For complete electoral history, see individual districts

2nd Saskatchewan Legislative Assembly
District	Member	Party
Arm River	George A. Scott	Liberal
Athabasca	Joseph Nolin	Liberal
Battleford	Sydney Simpson	Liberal
Cannington	John D. Stewart	Liberal
Canora	John D. Robertson	Liberal
Duck Lake	William Turgeon	Liberal
Estevan	George Bell	Liberal
Francis	John J. Stevenson	Liberal
Hanley	James MacNeill	Liberal
Humboldt	David Neely	Liberal
Kinistino	George B. Johnston	Provincial Rights
Last Mountain	Thomas Anderson	Provincial Rights
Lloydminster	Henry Lisle	Liberal
Maple Creek	David Wylie	Provincial Rights
Milestone	Albert Whitmore	Provincial Rights
Moose Jaw City	John Wellington	Provincial Rights
Moose Jaw County	John Sheppard	Liberal
Moose Mountain	William Elliot	Provincial Rights
Moosomin	Alexander S. Smith	Liberal
North Battleford	Donald Finlayson	Liberal
North Qu'Appelle	John Archibald McDonald	Provincial Rights
Pelly	John K. Johnston	Liberal
Pheasant Hills	Henry Willway	Provincial Rights
Pipestone	Archibald Gillis	Provincial Rights
Prince Albert City	John E. Bradshaw	Provincial Rights
Prince Albert County	Samuel J. Donaldson	Provincial Rights
Redberry	George Langley	Liberal
Regina City	James Bole	Liberal
Regina County	Frederick Tate	Provincial Rights
Rosthern	Gerhard Ens	Liberal
Saltcoats	Thomas MacNutt	Liberal
Saskatoon City	Archibald McNab	Liberal
Saskatoon County	William C. Sutherland	Liberal
Souris	Archibald Riddell	Provincial Rights
South Qu'Appelle	Frederick Haultain	Provincial Rights
Swift Current	Walter Scott	Liberal
Touchwood	George Atkinson	Liberal
Vonda	Albert Totzke	Liberal
Wadena	Herbert Pierce	Liberal
Weyburn	Robert Mitchell	Liberal
Yorkton	Thomas Garry	Liberal

== See also ==
- List of political parties in Saskatchewan
- List of Saskatchewan provincial electoral districts
