= List of premiers of Saskatchewan =

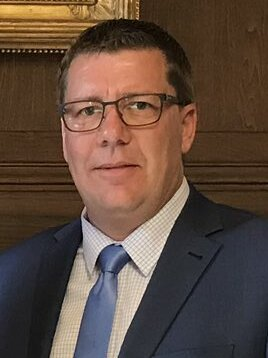
Scott Moe is the current premier of Saskatchewan, since 2018.

The premier of the Canadian province of Saskatchewan is the province's head of government since 1905. Saskatchewan uses a unicameral Westminster-style parliamentary government, in which the premier is the leader of the party that has the support of a majority in the Legislative Assembly. The premier chooses a cabinet from the elected members to form the Executive Council of Saskatchewan, and presides over that body.

Members are first elected to the legislature during general elections. The Canadian Charter of Rights and Freedoms provides that general elections must be conducted every five years from the date of the last election. By provincial law, Saskatchewan has had fixed election dates calling for elections every four years since 2007, implementing the standard practice since the 1938 election. The premier may also ask the lieutenant governor for early dissolution of the legislative assembly or an early election may be called if the governing party loses the confidence of the legislature, by the defeat of a supply bill or passage of a non-confidence motion.

Prior to 1905, Saskatchewan was part of the North-West Territories and was governed by the lieutenant-governor of the North-West Territories from 1870 until 1897, and the premier of the North-West Territories from 1897 to 1905.

== List of premiers ==
No.	Portrait	Name (Birth–Death)	Term of office	Electoral mandates (Assembly)	Political party	Parliamentary seat
Premiers of the North-West Territories
1		Frederick W. A. G. Haultain (1857–1942)	7 October 1897 – 1 September 1905	Title created (3rd NW Leg.) 1898 election (4th NW Leg.) 1902 election (5th NW Leg.)	Liberal–Conservative	MLA for Macleod
1		Frederick W. A. G. Haultain (1857–1942)	Led negotiations for provincial status for Alberta and Saskatchewan. Later led the Provincial Rights Party.			
Premiers of Saskatchewan
1		Thomas Walter Scott (1867–1938)	12 September 1905 – 20 October 1916	Title created (caretaker government) 1905 election (1st Leg.) 1908 election (2nd Leg.) 1912 election (3rd Leg.)	Liberal (Ldr. 1905)	MLA for Lumsden (1905–1908) MLA for Swift Current (1908–1916)
2		William Melville Martin (1876–1970)	20 October 1916 – 5 April 1922	Appointment (3rd Leg.) 1917 election (4th Leg.) 1921 election (5th Leg.)	Liberal (Ldr. 1916)	MLA for Regina City (1916–1921) MLA for Regina City #1 (1921–1922)
2		William Melville Martin (1876–1970)	For a period of one year, the only premier to not be President of the Executive Council—Martin served as Minister of Education, while J. A. Calder was President of the Executive Council, until 20 October 1917.			
3		Charles Avery Dunning (1885–1958)	5 April 1922 – 26 February 1926	Appointment (5th Leg.) 1925 election (6th Leg.)	Liberal (Ldr. 1922)	MLA for Moose Jaw County
4 (1 of 2)		James G. Gardiner (1883–1962)	26 February 1926 – 9 September 1929	Appointment (6th Leg.) 1929 election (7th Leg.)	Liberal (Ldr. 1926)	MLA for North Qu'Appelle
5		James Thomas Milton Anderson (1878–1946)	9 September 1929 – 19 July 1934	Appointment (7th Leg.)	Conservative (Ldr. 1924)	MLA for Saskatoon City #1
5		James Thomas Milton Anderson (1878–1946)	First premier to lead a minority coalition government.			
— (2 of 2)		James Garfield Gardiner (1883–1962)	19 July 1934 – 1 November 1935	1934 election (8th Leg.)	Liberal (Ldr. 1926)	MLA for Melville
6		William John Patterson (1886–1976)	1 November 1935 – 10 July 1944	Appointment (8th Leg.) 1938 election (9th Leg.)	Liberal (Ldr. 1935)	MLA for Cannington
6		William John Patterson (1886–1976)	First premier born in Saskatchewan.			
7		Tommy Douglas (1904–1986)	10 July 1944 – 7 November 1961	1944 election (10th Leg.) 1948 election (11th Leg.) 1952 election (12th Leg.) 1956 election (13th Leg.) 1960 election (14th Leg.)	Co-operative Commonwealth (Ldr. 1942)	MLA for Weyburn
8		Woodrow Lloyd (1913–1972)	7 November 1961 – 22 May 1964	Appointment (14th Leg.)	Co-operative Commonwealth (Ldr. 1961)	MLA for Biggar
8		Woodrow Lloyd (1913–1972)	First premier born after the establishment of the province in 1905.			
9		Ross Thatcher (1917–1971)	22 May 1964 – 30 June 1971	1964 election (15th Leg.) 1967 election (16th Leg.)	Liberal (Ldr. 1959)	MLA for Morse
10		Allan Blakeney (1925–2011)	30 June 1971 – 8 May 1982	1971 election (17th Leg.) 1975 election (18th Leg.) 1978 election (19th Leg.)	New Democratic (Ldr. 1970)	MLA for Regina Centre (1971–1975) MLA for Regina Elphinstone (1975–1982)
11		Grant Devine (b. 1944)	8 May 1982 – 1 November 1991	1982 election (20th Leg.) 1986 election (21st Leg.)	Progressive Conservative (Ldr. 1979)	MLA for Estevan
12		Roy Romanow (b. 1939)	1 November 1991 – 8 February 2001	1991 election (22nd Leg.) 1995 election (23rd Leg.) 1999 election (24th Leg.)	New Democratic (Ldr. 1987)	MLA for Saskatoon Riversdale
13		Lorne Calvert (b. 1952)	8 February 2001 – 21 November 2007	Appointment (24th Leg.) 2003 election (25th Leg.)	New Democratic (Ldr. 2001)	MLA for Saskatoon Riversdale
14		Brad Wall (b. 1965)	21 November 2007 – 2 February 2018	2007 election (26th Leg.) 2011 election (27th Leg.) 2016 election (28th Leg.)	Saskatchewan (Ldr. 2004)	MLA for Swift Current
15		Scott Moe (b. 1973)	2 February 2018 – incumbent	Appointment (28th Leg.) 2020 election (29th Leg.) 2024 election (30th Leg.)	Saskatchewan (Ldr. 2018)	MLA for Rosthern-Shellbrook

=== Premiers by party ===
Liberal Party (6)
New Democratic Party (3)
Co-operative Commonwealth Federation (2)
Progressive Conservative Party (2)
Saskatchewan Party (2)

Note: The Co-operative Commonwealth Federation (CCF) was succeeded by the New Democratic Party (NDP) in the 1960s. The party contested the 1964 election as the CCF-NDP.

== List of premiers by time in office ==
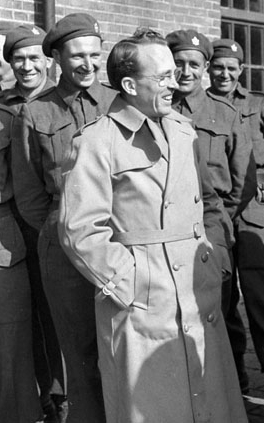
Tommy Douglas is Saskatchewan's longest serving premier, holding the office for more than 17 years and winning five consecutive elections between 1944 and 1960.

Rank	Premier	Incumbency	Terms of office		Elections won	Party
1	Tommy Douglas	17 years, 120 days	July 10, 1944	November 7, 1961	5	█ Co-operative Commonwealth
2	Thomas Walter Scott	11 years, 38 days	September 12, 1905	October 20, 1916	3	█ Liberal
3	Allan Blakeney	10 years, 312 days	June 30, 1971	May 8, 1982	3	█ New Democratic
4	Brad Wall	10 years, 73 days	November 21, 2007	February 2, 2018	3	█ Saskatchewan
5	Grant Devine	9 years, 177 days	May 8, 1982	November 1, 1991	2	█ Progressive Conservative
6	Roy Romanow	9 years, 99 days	November 1, 1991	February 8, 2001	3	█ New Democratic
7	Scott Moe (incumbent)	8 years, 254 days	February 2, 2018	Incumbent	2	█ Saskatchewan
8	William John Patterson	8 years, 252 days	November 1, 1935	July 10, 1944	1	█ Liberal
9	W. Ross Thatcher	7 years, 39 days	May 22, 1964	June 30, 1971	2	█ Liberal
10	Lorne Calvert	6 years, 286 days	February 8, 2001	November 21, 2007	1	█ New Democratic
11	William Melville Martin	5 years, 167 days	October 20, 1916	April 5, 1922	2	█ Liberal
12	James Thomas Milton Anderson	4 years, 313 days	September 9, 1929	July 19, 1934	1	█ Progressive Conservative
13	James Garfield Gardiner (Note: Gardiner served two non-consecutive terms)	4 years, 300 days	February 26, 1926	September 9, 1929	1	█ Liberal
13	James Garfield Gardiner	4 years, 300 days	July 19, 1934	November 1, 1935	1	█ Liberal
14	Charles Avery Dunning	3 years, 327 days	April 5, 1922	February 26, 1926	1	█ Liberal
15	Woodrow Lloyd	2 years, 197 days	November 7, 1961	May 22, 1964	0	█ Co-operative Commonwealth

== See also ==
- List of leaders of the opposition in Saskatchewan
- For more lists of this type, see Lists of incumbents.
