= Thomas Waddell (disambiguation) =

Thomas Waddell (1854–1940) was an Australian politician.

Thomas or Tom Waddell may also refer to:

- Thomas Waddell (Saskatchewan politician) (1886–1948), politician in Saskatchewan, Canada
- Tom Waddell (1937–1987), American physician, athlete and founder of the Gay Games
- Tom Waddell (baseball) (1958–2019), Scottish-born American professional baseball player
- Tom Waddell (footballer) (1870–1956), Scottish footballer

== See also ==
- Tom Waddle (born 1967), American football player
