= Henry Hildebrand =

Henry Hildebrand (November 16, 1911 – February 7, 2006) was a Ukrainian-Canadian pastor and educator. He is best known as the founding principal of Briercrest Bible Institute; the school is now known as Briercrest College and Seminary.

== Life ==
Hildebrand was born in 1911 at Steinfeld, a Mennonite village in southern Ukraine, then in the Russian Empire. He immigrated to Canada in 1925 with his parents Peter and Anna, and the rest of their family, for political reasons. They settled near Winkler, Manitoba. At age 14, Hildebrand was converted at a Canadian Sunday School Mission summer camp.

In 1929 Hildebrand enrolled in Winnipeg Bible Institute (now known as Providence University College and Theological Seminary), where he earned an undergraduate degree and completed a year of post-graduate studies. It was at this time he met Inger Soyland. A Norwegian by descent, Inger had come to Canada with a cousin to visit her aunt, but her return to Norway was cancelled when the Depression struck.

In 1935 he accepted an invitation to come to the small town of Briercrest, Saskatchewan, to lead the Briercrest Gospel Assembly. That same year Briercrest Bible Institute was founded. In 1946 the institute moved to Caronport, Saskatchewan, and a Christian high school was created. The Bible institute grew to become one of Canada's largest Christian post-secondary schools (now known as Briercrest College and Seminary). At the same time, Hildebrand was also running a radio ministry.

Hildebrand married Inger Soyland on August 12, 1937, and brought his new bride to Briercrest. Their family grew to include five children, Marcia, Evelyn, David, Paul, and Glen.

After his retirement in 1977, Hildebrand served as chancellor until 1990, and chancellor emeritus until his death. He and Inger moved from Caronport in 1992, but remained very involved in the ministry of Briercrest.

On October 24, 1979, Hildebrand was invested by Governor-General Edward Schreyer with membership in the nation's highest civil honour, the Order of Canada, for his leadership in Christian education through Briercrest and the impact of his life upon Canadian youth and society.

== Education ==
Winnipeg Bible Institute

- 1930-32 - Diploma
- 1932-33 - Post-graduate

Wheaton College

- 1949

Winona Lake School of Theology

- 1964 - BA (major in Bible)
- 1966 - MA

== Recognition ==
- Order of Canada - October 24, 1979
- Received the nation's highest civil honour at a ceremony at Government House, Ottawa
- Hildebrand was invested by Governor-General Edward Schreyer with membership in the Order of Canada
- Given in recognition of Dr. Hildebrand's lifelong work in Christian education through Briercrest Family of Schools and for the impact of his life upon Canadian youth and society.
- Honorary doctorate (Doctor of Divinity) from Providence College in 1977.
- Honorary doctorate (Doctor of Pedagogy) from Briercrest Bible College in 1992
- Queen's Golden Jubilee Medal in 2002.

== Church affiliation ==
- Caronport Community Church
- Central Heights MB Church - Abbotsford, BC

== Books published ==
- In His Loving Service (Memoirs by Henry Hildebrand) (published 1985)
- Contemporary Leadership Dynamics - Illustrations from Acts (published 1987)
- The Model of Servant Leadership (published 1990)
- Living the Abounding Life - Empowered by the Holy Spirit (published 1996)
- Our Gracious and Loving Heavenly Father - Devotionals - Book 1 (published 1999)
- Our Gracious and Loving Heavenly Father - Devotionals - Book 2 (published 2000)
- Joyful Servants: A Biography of David and Jeannie Hildebrand (published 2001)
- Our Gracious God and Loving Heavenly Father, Vols. 1, 2, 3, 4

== See also ==
- Sinclair Alexander Whittaker
- William Aberhart
