= Briercrest College and Seminary =

Canadian college in Saskatchewan (1935-)

Coordinates: 50°27′21.99″N 105°48′53.17″W

- Established: 1935
- Affiliations: University of Saskatchewan, Minot State University, AUCC, ATS, ABHE, Associated Gospel Churches.
- President: Michael B. Pawelke
- Undergraduates: 640
- Location: Caronport, Saskatchewan, Canada
- Campus: Rural area
- Website: www.briercrest.ca

Briercrest College and Seminary is a private evangelical post-secondary educational institution located in Caronport, Saskatchewan, Canada. It comprises a college and a seminary, and operates the Briercrest Christian Academy.

== History ==
Briercrest Bible Institute was founded on October 19, 1935, by Henry Hildebrand and Sinclair Whittaker. 11 students were enrolled. A rented house served as dormitory, classroom, and office for the school. Hildebrand was principal and Annie Hillson, Isabel Whittaker, Jean Whittaker, and Margaret Rusk helped with teaching and administration. Donald McMillan joined them in the second term as assistant principal.

By 1946, the school had outgrown its facility, and Whittaker arranged the purchase of RCAF Station Caron (a former British Commonwealth Air Training Plan facility which trained aircrew in World War II) for $50,000. The new facility was dedicated on July 1, 1946, and the task of converting the airbase into dormitories, classrooms, offices, and staff housing began.

College enrolment grew from 285 in 1970 to 775 in 1985 and peaked in 2002 with 869 students in the College and 247 in the Seminary, before changing names to Briercrest College in 2003. More recently, enrolment has been in decline. As of 2019, enrolment at Briercrest Christian Academy (formerly Caronport High School) is at 141 students, Briercrest College has 489 students, and Briercrest Seminary with 286 students.

The decline in student enrolment has also caused financial instability with a budget deficit of $2.17 million in 2019, $2.26 million in 2018 and $1.18 million in 2017.

== Academics ==
Briercrest College and Seminary offers one-year certificates, Associate of Arts degrees, Bachelor of Arts, Master of Arts, and Master of Divinity degrees. Each program includes courses in Bible and theology, Christian ministry, liberal arts, and the social sciences along with many electives. The college has been accredited by The Association for Biblical Higher Education since 1976. The Government of Saskatchewan authorizes Briercrest to grant degrees in "Bachelor of Arts in English/English (Honours)", "Bachelor of Arts in History/History (Honours)", Bachelor of Arts in Psychology, and "Bachelor of Arts in Humanities". A number of other programs are currently grandfathered in and will have until 2020 to meet quality assurance criteria under the province's 2012 Degree Authorization Act. The seminary is accredited by the Association of Theological Schools. The seminary employs a modular format (typically one course in one week) for most of its courses.

Briercrest also offers distance learning courses at both the college and seminary levels.

The college is associated with the Saskatchewan Institute of Applied Science and Technology (SIAST) and has transfer agreements with the universities of Regina and Saskatchewan.

In early 2011 Briercrest and Minot State University announced a partnership allowing students to complete a Bachelor of Arts degree and a Bachelor of Science in Education degree from both schools in five years. The program requires students to complete their Bachelor of Arts degree during the first three years at Briercrest college and the final two at Minot State earning the Education degree. Minot State offers five different concentrations for its B.S.E. As such a student completing this program may select earning a Bachelor of Science in:

- Elementary Education
- English
- History
- Music
- Physical Education

Briercrest also offers other concurrent degrees with Minot State University such as:

- Addiction Studies
- Communication Disorders
- Social Work

== Student life ==
The majority of Briercrest College students live in residence and participate in a school meal plan in a dining hall operated by Sodexo. Unmarried students aged 22 years and under (as of the first semester of the school year) in their first three years of study are required to live in residence while enrolled.

The college bans the consumption of alcohol and tobacco by its students (both on and off campus) as well as using profanity, watching pornography, or cross-dressing. Social dancing is also not permitted except at college-sponsored events. The college also prohibits students from engaging in premarital sex or engaging in homosexuality. The school mandates attendance at daily chapel services and other events. These and other expectations are outlined in the Student Responsibilities and Expectations manual.

Campus/community radio station CJOS-FM was based at and funded by the college. It was launched in 1995 and ceased broadcasting and relinquished its license in 2006.

== Facilities ==
The campus landmark is the 2,000-seat Hildebrand Chapel. Facilities also include a 25,000-square-foot (2,300 m^{2}) library, nine student dormitories, a 42-room inn, a modern dining hall, a double-court gymnasium, a hockey arena, tennis courts, numerous sports fields, and a recording studio.

During the year of 2020-21, the gas station/coffee shop formerly known as "The Point", was acquired by new ownership and underwent renovations to open as "The Beacon". This newly renovated facility consists of a Husky gas station, Subway, and Coffee Shop while also having space for students and townsfolk to come to view acactv streams of the school's various sports teams or purchase athletics apparel to show support.

As of September 2021, the campus features a brand new Athletics facility. This is the Can West Performance Center that consists of; artificial turf, various workout equipment, a film room, and an athletic therapy room.

== Presidents ==
Throughout its history, Briercrest has had six presidents: Henry Hildebrand (1935–1977); Henry Budd (1977–1990); John Barkman (1990–1996); Paul Magnus (1996–2004); Dwayne Uglem (2004–2013); and Michael Pawelke (2013–present) — Sinclair Whittaker served as president of the board until 1950.

== Notable alumni ==
- Nuela Charles, musician
- Larry R. Heather, politician
- Ben Heppner, politician
- Raymond Loewen, businessman
- Marc Martel, musician
- Stephen Nash, volleyball player
- Carl E. Olson, theologian
- Rachael Thomas, politician
- Maurice Vellacott, politician
