= Sinclair Alexander Whittaker =

Canadian politician

Member of the Saskatchewan Legislative Assembly for Moose Jaw County
- In office 1929–1934
- Succeeded by: Thomas Waddell

Personal details
- Born: 1888; Port Perry, Ontario, Canada
- Died: July 10, 1974 (aged 85–86)
- Political party: Progressive Conservative Party of Saskatchewan
- Occupation: Operated general stores
- Known for: Briercrest Bible Institute founder/chairman Retail Merchants Association of Saskatchewan chairman

Sinclair Alexander Whittaker (1888 – July 10, 1974) was a merchant and political figure in Saskatchewan. He represented Moose Jaw County from 1929 to 1934 in the Legislative Assembly of Saskatchewan as a Conservative.

He was born in Port Perry, Ontario and, in 1910, moved to Briercrest, Saskatchewan. He operated a small chain of general stores in the province. Sinclair helped found the Briercrest Bible Institute and served as chairman of the board for the institute. He also was chairman of the Retail Merchants Association of Saskatchewan. He was defeated by Thomas Waddell when he ran for re-election in 1934.

== See also ==
- William Aberhart
- Henry Hildebrand
