= John Edwin Chisholm =

Canadian politician

John Edwin Chisholm (July 6, 1882 – 1964) was a lawyer and political figure in Saskatchewan. He represented Moose Jaw County from 1916 to 1917 as a Conservative.

He was born in Dartmouth, Nova Scotia, the son of John Chisholm and Christina Isabella Graham, both of Scottish descent. He was educated in Dartmouth, at the Halifax County Academy and at Dalhousie University, receiving a LL.B. in 1906. Later that year, he travelled west to Moose Jaw, Saskatchewan, where he set up practice. Chisholm also owned and operated a large farm. In 1915, he married Edith Simington. Chisholm was elected to the provincial assembly in a 1916 by-election held after John Albert Sheppard resigned his seat. He was defeated by Charles Avery Dunning when he ran for reelection to the provincial assembly in 1917.
