= Charles Avery Dunning =

3rd Premier of Saskatchewan (1922–1926)

The Honourable Charles Avery Dunning PC
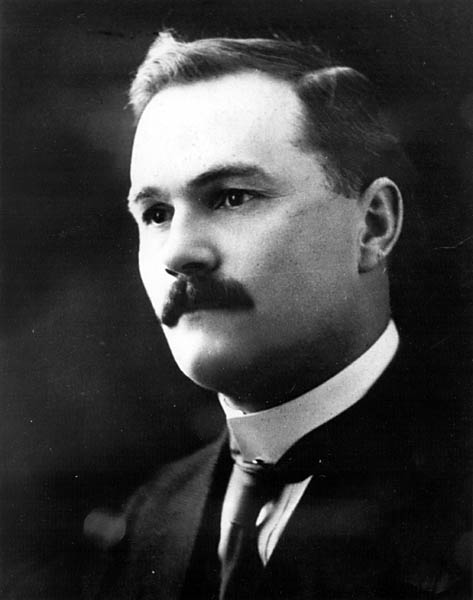

3rd Premier of Saskatchewan
- In office April 5, 1922 – February 26, 1926
- Monarch: George V
- Lieutenant Governor: Henry William Newlands
- Preceded by: William Melville Martin
- Succeeded by: James Garfield Gardiner

Provincial Treasurer
- In office October 20, 1916 – February 26, 1916
- Preceded by: George Alexander Bell
- Succeeded by: William John Patterson

Minister of Railways
- In office October 20, 1917 – February 15, 1919
- Preceded by: James Alexander Calder
- Succeeded by: William Melville Martin

Minister of Telephones
- In office May 16, 1918 – February 15, 1919
- Preceded by: George Alexander Bell
- Succeeded by: William Erskine Knowles

Minister of Agriculture
- In office February 15, 1919 – April 26, 1920
- Preceded by: George Langley
- Succeeded by: Charles McGill Hamilton

Provincial Secretary
- In office June 14, 1921 – April 5, 1922
- Preceded by: Samuel John Latta
- Succeeded by: John Michael Uhrich

Minister of Municipal Affairs
- In office December 12, 1921 – April 5, 1922
- Preceded by: Charles McGill Hamilton
- Succeeded by: Charles McGill Hamilton

Leader of the Liberal Party of Saskatchewan
- In office 1922–1926
- Preceded by: William Melville Martin
- Succeeded by: James Garfield Gardiner

Member of the Legislative Assembly of Saskatchewan for Kinistino
- In office November 13, 1916 – June 26, 1917
- Preceded by: Edward Devline
- Succeeded by: John Richard P. Taylor

Member of the Legislative Assembly of Saskatchewan for Moose Jaw County
- In office June 26, 1917 – February 26, 1926
- Preceded by: John Edwin Chisholm
- Succeeded by: Thomas Waddell

Member of the Canadian Parliament for Regina
- In office March 16, 1926 – July 28, 1930
- Preceded by: Francis Nicholson Darke
- Succeeded by: Franklin White Turnbull

Member of the Canadian Parliament for Queen's
- In office December 30, 1935 – March 26, 1940 Serving with Peter Sinclair
- Preceded by: J. James Larabee
- Succeeded by: Cyrus MacMillan; James Lester Douglas

Personal details
- Born: July 31, 1885 Croft, Leicestershire, England
- Died: October 1, 1958 (aged 73) Montreal
- Resting place: Mount Royal Cemetery, Montreal
- Party: Saskatchewan Liberal Party
- Other political affiliations: Liberal Party of Canada
- Spouse: Ada Rowlatt
- Occupation: Farmer and businessman

Charles Avery Dunning PC (July 31, 1885 – October 1, 1958) was the third premier of Saskatchewan. Born in England, he emigrated to Canada at the age of 16. By the age of 36, he was premier. He had a successful career as a farmer, businessman, and politician, both provincially and federally.

A Liberal, Dunning led his government in one general election, in 1925, winning a majority government. He was the third of six Liberal premiers to date. He resigned as Premier in 1926 to enter federal politics and was succeeded by James Gardiner. He served in the Cabinet of Prime Minister William Lyon Mackenzie King.

After leaving politics, Dunning served for many years as the Chancellor of Queen's University at Kingston.

== Early life ==
The Original Crown Grant for the Dunning Homestead

Known throughout his life as "Charlie", Dunning was born in Croft, Leicestershire, England. As a teenager, he originally worked in an iron foundry in England, but in 1902, at age 16, he followed a friend's advice and travelled to Canada to work as a farm hand.

Penniless when he arrived, within a year Dunning filed for his own homestead under the Dominion Lands Act in the Beaver Dale district, west of Yorkton. Satisfied that a permanent move to Canada made sense, he convinced the remainder of his family to come to Saskatchewan, operating a farm in partnership with his father. He eventually married Ada Rowlatt from Saskatchewan, with whom he had two children.

== Business career in Saskatchewan ==
During his career as a farmer, Dunning was involved in the local of the Saskatchewan Grain Growers' Association, an early proponent of a farmer-owned cooperative grain marketing system. In 1910, he attended the general meeting of the Association. Dunning's enthusiasm was apparent, and he was promptly elected as a director. The following year, he was elected as vice-president of the Association.

In 1919, Dunning prepared a report on the grain elevator system, which led to the incorporation of the Saskatchewan Co-operative Elevator Company by the Saskatchewan government. The SCEC was a farmers' cooperative, financed in part by shares purchased by farmers at $7.50 per share, and in part by a loan guarantee from the provincial government. A co-operative marketing system required physical assets. Dunning was appointed a provisional director of a board that had only a few months to raise the necessary capital to build a line of rural grain elevators. At age 25, the youngest man on the board, Dunning watched as each one of his seniors turned down the critical job of organizing the capital campaign. Dunning took the job and succeeded. The following year, in 1911, he was rewarded for his efforts by being named the first general manager of the company. Four years later, it was the largest grain handling company in the world. Under Dunning's management, the SCEC had built 230 elevators and had handled over 28 million bushels of grains.

As manager, Dunning was instrumental in developing a provincial hail insurance scheme, which survives today as Saskatchewan Municipal Hail Insurance. He also sat on two royal commissions, the Grain Market Commission and the Agricultural Credit Commission. He became a wealthy man, with a reputation for integrity.

== Provincial politics: 1916 – 1926 ==
=== MLA and Cabinet Minister: 1916 – 1922 ===
Dunning's interests turned to politics. The Liberal government of Walter Scott, Saskatchewan's first premier, was tainted with allegations of corruption. Scott resigned, and an outsider to provincial politics, William Melville Martin, succeeded him as Liberal leader and premier, with a mandate to clean up the government. Martin recruited Dunning to the new Liberal government. In October 1916, Martin brought Dunning into Cabinet, appointing him as Provincial Treasurer. Dunning then stood for election to the Legislative Assembly of Saskatchewan in a by-election held in the Kinistino constituency in November 1916. Unopposed, he was acclaimed a Member of the Legislative Assembly. Dunning held the position of Provincial Treasurer continuously for his ten years as an MLA.

Traditional politics were being challenged, as farmer movements had become politically active, creating new political parties throughout Canada. Dunning's political astuteness, and his strong background in farmer organisations, were significant factors in the Saskatchewan Liberal Party retaining power. During his time in provincial politics, Dunning persuaded the farmer's movement in Saskatchewan to support the provincial Liberals, and eventually the federal Liberal party as well, at a time when farmers elsewhere switched their support to the Progressive Party of Canada and the United Farmers.

In the general election of 1917, Dunning won a contested race for the seat of Moose Jaw County by obtaining twice the votes of his opponent. He remained the member for Moose Jaw County for the remainder of his time in provincial politics. Dunning ran unopposed in the general election of 1921, and won a contested race in the general election of 1925 by a 2.5 to 1 margin.

Between 1916 and 1922, Dunning held a series of Cabinet posts. In addition to his ten years as Provincial Treasurer, he also was appointed Provincial Secretary, Minister of Agriculture, Minister of Municipal Affairs, Minister of Railways, and Minister of Telephones.

=== Premier of Saskatchewan: 1922 – 1926 ===
The continued political tensions between the federal Liberal Party and the farmer-influenced Progressives led to Dunning becoming Premier of Saskatchewan in 1922, at age 36.

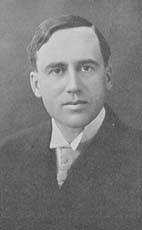
Premier Martin, whose support for the federal Liberals led to Dunning becoming premier

The federal Liberals were increasingly unpopular in Saskatchewan, which contributed to the rise of the Progressives. The provincial Liberals continued to advance their position as a farmers' party, to the point that in 1921, Premier Martin severed the organizational ties between the Saskatchewan Liberal Party and the federal Liberal Party. He also recruited another popular farm leader, John Archibald Maharg. Like Dunning, Maharg had ties to the farmer co-operative movement, being the president of the Saskatchewan Grain Growers Association and the Saskatchewan Co-operative Elevator Company. Maharg agreed to support the Martin government, although he stood for election as an independent member, not as a Liberal. By maintaining a close connection to the farmers with the support of Dunning and Maharg, the Martin government was re-elected in the 1921 provincial election with a substantial majority, although some Progressive candidates were also elected, forming the official opposition. Martin kept Dunning as Provincial Treasurer, and appointed Maharg as Minister of Agriculture.

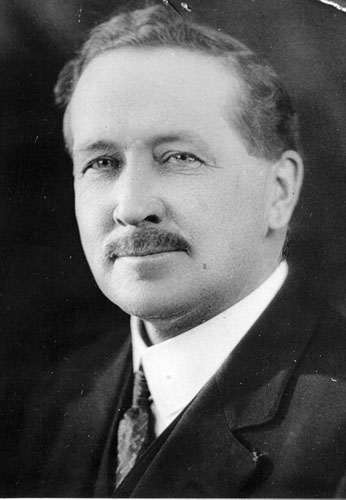
John Archibald Maharg, whose resignation ended Martin's government

The situation changed with the federal election late in 1921. The federal Progressives continued to oppose the unpopular federal Liberals. Premier Martin intervened in the election at the local level in Saskatchewan, campaigning for Liberal candidates, including the Liberal candidate in Regina. His support for the federal Liberals angered the Saskatchewan Grain Growers Association, who began to discuss the possibility of establishing a separate farmer party. Maharg accused Martin of acting in bad faith, and resigned from Cabinet. He crossed the floor and eventually became the leader of the opposition.

The contretemps between Martin and Maharg had the potential to split the provincial Liberal party. A few months after the federal election, Martin resigned as premier and as leader of the Liberal party. The Liberals chose Dunning as the new party leader, and he then became premier of Saskatchewan. His immediate task as premier was to repair relations with the farm movement. He met with representatives of the Saskatchewan Grain Growers Association, to reassure them that he still supported the farm movement, rather than the Liberal government in Ottawa, and that the provincial Liberals were in fact a farmer party. He also requested copies of resolutions from the SGGA annual convention, presumably to assist in setting government policy. Dunning's overtures were successful, and the SSGA pulled back from suggestions that they should use their organisational strength to establish a separate farmer party.

Dunning further established the position of the Liberal government in a series of by-elections, most of which resulted in Liberal candidates being elected. By the time of the next general election in 1925, Dunning had healed the rift with the farmers. The Liberals were re-elected with a substantial majority, and the Progressives were unable to build on their previous success in the 1922 election.

The main issue the Dunning government faced was the falling price of wheat, which resulted from a post-war depression. His government supported the re-establishment of the Canadian Wheat Board by the federal government. The Dunning government ended prohibition after a 1924 plebiscite, but sought to continue regulation through government-owned and operated liquor stores.

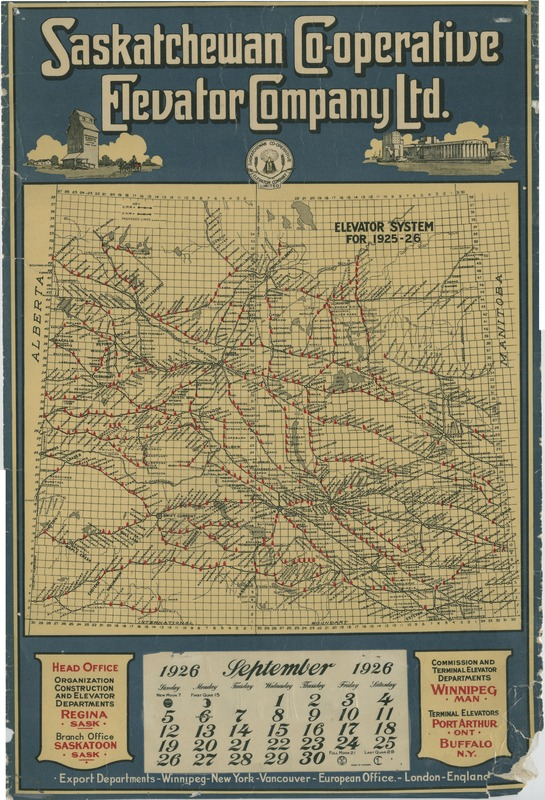
A 1926 calendar from the Saskatchewan Cooperative Elevator Company, its last year of operation.

Dunning also supported efforts towards voluntary pooling of farm products, and the nascent Saskatchewan Wheat Pool. His last major policy step as premier was to arrange for the enactment of legislation to authorise the sale of the Saskatchewan Cooperative Elevator Company to the Saskatchewan Wheat Pool, over the objections of Maharg, who was still on the board of the SCEC. The Wheat Pool bought the SCEC for $11 million. (The equivalent in 2021 would be $166.91 million.) Farmers who bought shares in the SCEC for $7.50 in 1911 when Dunning was general manager would receive $155.84 per share in 1926.

== Federal politics: 1926 – 1930 ==
=== Potential Liberal leader ===
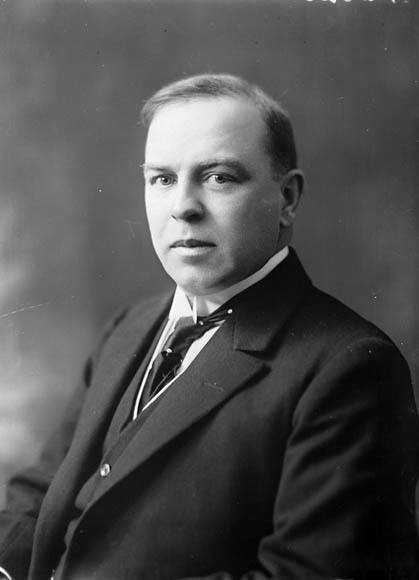
Prime Minister Mackenzie King recruited Dunning to federal politics in 1926

Western farmers had traditionally been a source of support for the federal Liberals, but in the 1921 federal election many farmers had instead supported the Progressive party. The new leader of the federal Liberals, William Lyon Mackenzie King, had managed to defeat the Conservatives led by Prime Minister Arthur Meighen, but only won a minority government. King was able to stay in power only by support from the Progressives. King was determined to rebuild the Liberals' farm support, particularly in western Canada.

In an effort to win back farmers, Mackenzie King began to court Dunning with his strong farm roots, encouraging him to enter federal politics. Campaigning in Saskatchewan at one point, with Dunning also on the speakers' platform, King spontaneously stated to the audience that he would like to see Dunning in the federal Cabinet. In 1926, Dunning accepted the invitation. Resigning as premier and leaving provincial politics, he was elected to the federal riding of Regina by acclamation in a by-election held in March, 1926, as a member of the federal Liberals.

Even though King brought Dunning to Ottawa, there was a risk for King, namely that Dunning could displace King as the leader of the Liberals. In the 1925 election, the Liberals had actually come in second in seats in the House of Commons, behind the Conservatives, and only held onto power through another minority government with Progressive support. King had also been personally defeated in his own riding in Ontario. He was only able to re-enter the Commons when the Liberal member for Prince Albert, Saskatchewan resigned his seat. King was elected in the Prince Albert by-election. King was able to stay in office as prime minister, but his position as party leader was not strong.

In light of the 1925 election results and King's personal defeat, some of the power brokers in the Liberal party began to consider whether Dunning would make a better leader than King. Quiet behind-the-scenes preparations started to be made, in case King stumbled badly and it was necessary to install Dunning as leader.

By June, 1926, King was no longer able to govern. His minority government, elected only half a year earlier in the 1925 election, depended on support from the Progressives, but a political scandal in the Customs department triggered the withdrawal of Progressive support. Dunning, now in the House of Commons, vigorously defended the Liberal government, providing strong support for King, but knowing that King's defeat might well make him Liberal leader. Facing a vote of censure in the Commons which, if passed, would likely bring down his government, on June 28, 1926, King requested that the Governor General, Viscount Byng of Vimy, dissolve Parliament and call a general election. Byng refused, relying on the reserve power invested in him by the Imperial government. King immediately resigned, and Byng called on Meighen, now the Leader of the Opposition, to form a government.

The Liberals and Dunning were now in opposition. King's status as party leader was even more in doubt. The movement among leading Liberals to draft Dunning as a replacement as party leader grew stronger, now almost out in the open.

However, the party standings in the House of Commons were so close that Meighen was unable to put together a stable government. Appointed as prime minister on June 28, 1926, Meighen lost a vote of confidence in the Commons by one vote only a few days later, at 2 a.m. on July 2, 1926. Meighen in turn requested that the Governor General dissolve Parliament. This time Byng granted the dissolution, with the general election set for September.

King campaigned on the basis that Byng's refusal to grant him a dissolution, and then in turn granting a dissolution to his political opponent, was unwarranted Imperial interference in Canadian affairs. The controversy, known as the King-Byng Affair, was a winning platform for King and the Liberals. They were returned to power, although still with a minority government.

Doubts about King's status as party leader ended. Dunning was re-elected to his Regina seat by 900 votes and King again appointed him to Cabinet, no longer viewing him as a threat.

=== Minister of Railways and Canals: 1926 – 1929 ===
When Dunning had been elected to the House of Commons in March 1926, King had immediately appointed him to the powerful position of Minister of Railways and Canals in the federal Cabinet. King re-appointed him to the same portfolio after the Liberals were returned to office in September, 1926. The position was one of particular importance to western farmers, who were dependent on the national railway system to get their products to markets.

During his time as Minister of Railways and Canals, Dunning established himself as a friend of the Western farmer. Decisions made during Dunning's tenure included his accession to a petition from area farmers to have the Canadian National Railways build a branch line through his old home of Beaver Dale to Parkerview, Saskatchewan. He also settled a longstanding debate by choosing Churchill, Manitoba as the terminus of the Hudson Bay Railway. Upon completion of the railway and port facilities in 1931, Churchill became the closest Canadian port to Liverpool. The shipping route to Churchill was 1,600 kilometres shorter than the overland route to Montreal. Dunning was also a staunch supporter of Sir Henry Thornton, the U.S.-born Englishman who, in 1922 had taken over the presidency of the Canadian National Railways.

=== Minister of Finance: 1929 – 1930 ===
In 1929, when Dunning was still a relatively young man at age 44, King appointed him the federal Minister of Finance. As in his previous portfolio, Dunning earned a reputation for hard work and fairness. It was said that it was typical of Dunning that, although feeling ill, he remained on his feet throughout the reading and passage of his first set of estimates as Minister of Finance. As soon as the estimates were passed, Dunning collapsed and was rushed to the hospital to be treated for appendicitis.

Dunning was not only interested in domestic politics. He was also keenly interested in international politics, and particularly, in Canada's relationship with his "old country", the United Kingdom. Dunning participated in Canada's delegation to the League of Nations.

In 1930, when the United States proposed the draconian Smoot-Hawley tariff, Canada's response was the Dunning tariff with increased duties and further tariff preference for the United Kingdom and other Commonwealth countries. The opposition Conservatives criticised the tariff on the basis that the imperial preference was prejudicial to Canadian interests.

=== Defeat in the 1930 election ===
Canadians went to the polls in the general election of July, 1930, at the beginning of the Great Depression. The Conservatives under their new leader, Richard Bennett, defeated King and the Liberals, winning a majority government. Although Bennett had opposed the Dunning tariff while in opposition, the Conservatives maintained the tariff, which stayed in effect until renegotiated in the late 1930s.

Dunning lost his Regina seat by over 3,500 votes (obtaining only two-thirds of the winner's total). Safe Liberal seats were offered to Dunning, but he turned them down, thinking that a business career would protect his family's financial future. He restarted his business career reorganizing an under-performing subsidiary of the Canadian Pacific Railway, thereafter establishing a reputation as a brilliant re-organizer of insolvent companies.

=== Minister of Finance: 1935 – 1939 ===
King and the Liberals regained power in the 1935 general election. Now firmly in control of the Liberal party and the government, he immediately went to Dunning, pressing him to re-enter politics. King convinced Dunning that he was needed in the tough economic times created by the Great Depression. A sitting Member of Parliament was persuaded to step aside, and Dunning was yet again acclaimed, in a 1936 by-election held in the constituency of Queen's in Prince Edward Island. Dunning returned to the Finance portfolio. This time, one of Dunning's legacies was the establishment of the Central Mortgage Bank, the predecessor to the Canada Mortgage and Housing Corporation.

Dunning was still sometimes mentioned as a possible successor to King, but in 1938, Dunning had a heart attack. Unable to carry on the stress of his Cabinet position, and locked in a perpetual conflict with the other Saskatchewan minister in the Cabinet, Jimmy Gardiner, in 1939 Dunning retired from politics.

== Second business career: 1940 – 1958 ==
In ill health, Dunning relocated to Montreal. In 1940, he was appointed as president and CEO of Ogilvie Flour Mills, a position he held until 1947, when he was appointed chairman of the board. In addition to his duties with Ogilvie, Dunning continued his business of corporate reorganization. He sat on a number of prestigious corporate and bank boards, including that of the Canadian Pacific Railway.

During World War II, Dunning was chair of the National War Loans Committee, raising money for the war effort. He was also chair of Allied Supplies Limited, a company created by the federal government to co-ordinate the production of munitions and explosives.

== Chancellor of Queen's University at Kingston ==
In 1940, Dunning was awarded an honorary doctorate by Queen's University at Kingston, and was appointed chancellor of the university. Although Dunning was not himself a wealthy man, his contacts in the business world enabled him to raise considerable funds for Queen's. One story is that during a meeting of the CPR Board, Dunning passed a note to Colonel Robert Samuel McLaughlin, a wealthy member of the Board, saying that Queen's needed a new engineering building. The note came back with an invitation to talk after the meeting. A new engineering building at Queen's was the result. Dunning also used his financial expertise for general fund-raising campaigns. With his knowledge of federal tax law, he was able to find a new way for companies to make donations and take considerable tax benefits, resulting in substantial donations to Queen's.

Dunning's abilities earned him the gratitude of the university, which named Dunning Hall in his honour. The Chancellor Dunning Trust Lectureship was established by an anonymous donor, to "promote the understanding and appreciation of the supreme importance of the dignity, freedom, and responsibility of the individual person in human society". More recently, the university has established the Stauffer-Dunning Chair in Public Policy.

== Death ==
Dunning died in 1958, aged 74, following kidney surgery. He is buried in Mount Royal Cemetery in Montreal.

== Honours ==
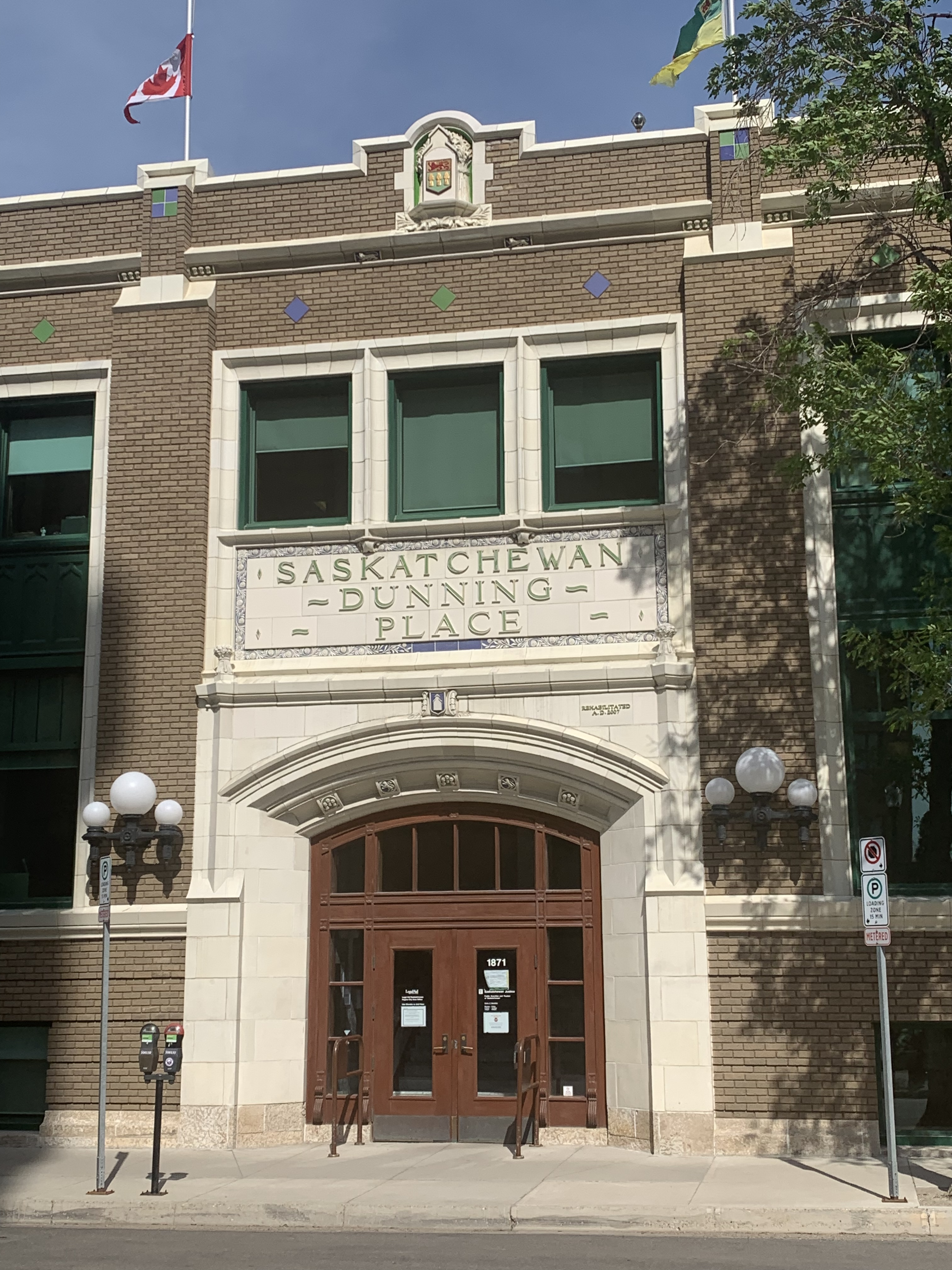
Dunning Place, Regina

In 1985, Dunning was designated as a National Historic Person by the federal government's heritage registry.

In 2005, as part of Saskatchewan's centennial celebration, Dunning's memory was commemorated in two ways. First, the Provincial Revenue Building was renamed Dunning Place, recognising Dunning's long tenure as Provincial Treasurer. The Saskatchewan Cooperative Elevator Company also had its offices in the building when Dunning was general manager.

Second, on the initiative of Saskatchewan's Lieutenant-Governor, Dr. Gordon Barnhart, Dunning's gravesite in Montreal's Mount Royal Cemetery was commemorated by a bronze plaque, recognizing Dunning's contribution to the people of Saskatchewan.

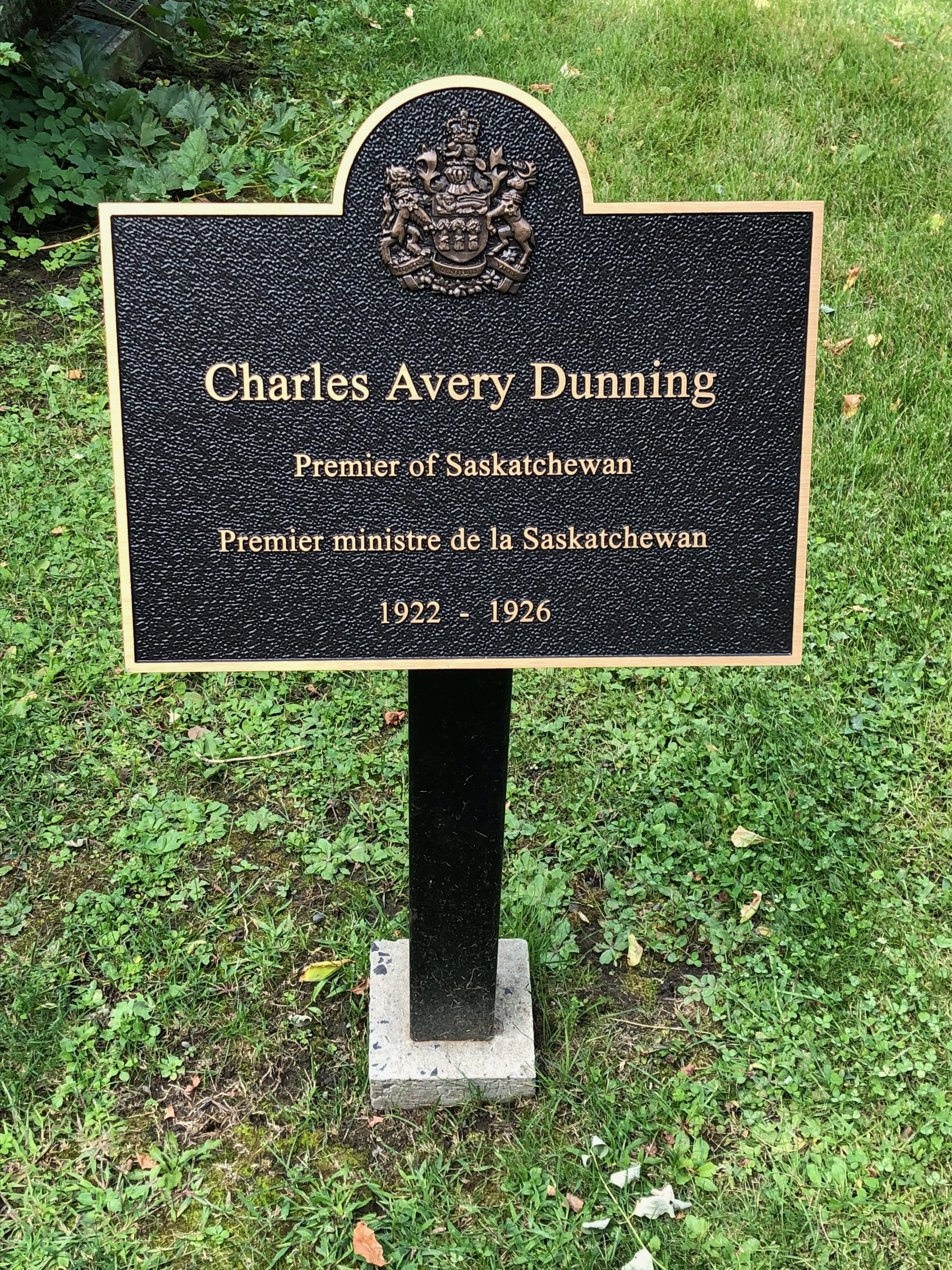
Commemorative plaque about Dunning in Mount Royal Cemetery

Dunning Hall at Queen's University is named after Dunning. Queen's School of Business occupied Dunning Hall for many years. Since 2002, it has housed the Department of Economics.

In addition to his honorary degree from Queen's, Dunning also received honorary doctorates from McGill University in 1939 and the University of Saskatchewan in 1946.

Dunning Crescent in Regina is named after Dunning.

== Electoral record ==
=== Summary ===
Dunning served the third-shortest term of the fifteen Premiers of Saskatchewan. As premier, Dunning won one majority government, in the general election of 1925. He served one continuous term, from April 5, 1922, to February 26, 1926, and was in office as premier for a total of 3 years, 327 days.

Dunning was first elected as a member of the Legislative Assembly of Saskatchewan in 1916, and was re-elected in the general elections of 1917, 1921 and 1925. He was acclaimed in the 1916 by-election, and again in the 1921 general election. Dunning won two contested constituency elections (in 1917 and 1925) by significant margins. His total time as a member of the Legislative Assembly from 1916 to 1926 was 9 years, 105 days.

Dunning entered federal politics in 1926, being elected to the House of Commons of Canada by acclamation in a by-election in March 1926. He was re-elected in the general election in the fall of 1926. He lost his seat in the general election of 1930, but was re-elected by acclamation in by-election in 1935, this time from the riding of Queen's in Prince Edward Island. He served in the Commons for a total of 8 years, 6 months, 10 days.

Dunning stood for election a total of nine times, provincial and federal. He was elected by acclamation five times, won contested elections three times, and was defeated once. His total time as an elected representative, provincial and federal, was 17 years, 200 days.

=== 1925 General election ===
Dunning led the Liberal Party in one general election, in 1925, and won a majority government.

Saskatchewan General Election: June 2, 1925
Party	Leaders	Candidates	Seats Won	Popular Vote	Popular Vote Percentage
Liberal	Charles Avery Dunning^{1}	62	50	127,751	51.51%
Progressive	Charles Tran^{2}	40	6	57,142	23.04%
Conservative	James Anderson^{2}	18	3	45,515	18.35%
Independent	–	6	2	8,703	3.51%
Labour–Liberal	–	1	1	4,704	1.90%
Independent Liberal	–	1	1	2,653	1.07%
Independent Conservative	–	1	0	1,545	0.62%
Total		129	63	248,013	100.00%
Source: Elections Saskatchewan – Elections Results – 1925

^{1} Premier when election was called; Premier after the election.
^{2} Co-Leader of the Opposition when the election was called; Co-Leader of the Opposition after the election.

=== Saskatchewan constituency elections ===
Dunning stood for election to the Legislative Assembly four times, once in a by-election and in three general elections, in two different ridings (Kinistino and Moose Jaw County). He was acclaimed twice, and won twice by substantial margins.

==== 1916 By-election: Kinistino ====
Provincial By-Election, November 13, 1916: Kinistino
Party	Candidate	Popular Vote	%
Liberal	E Charles Avery Dunning	Acclaimed	–
Total		–	–
Source: Saskatchewan Archives – Election Results by Electoral Division – Kinistino

The by-election was called on the resignation of the sitting Liberal member, Edward Haywood Devline, to give Dunning, who had been appointed Provincial Treasurer, an opportunity to win a seat in the Legislation Assembly.

E Elected.

==== 1917 General election: Moose Jaw County ====
Saskatchewan General Election, June 26, 1917: Moose Jaw County
Party	Candidate	Popular Vote	%
Liberal	E Charles Avery Dunning	3,316	64.6%
Conservative	X John Edwin Chisholm	1,815	35.4%
Total		5,131	100.0%
Source: Saskatchewan Archives – Election Results by Electoral Division – Moose Jaw County

E Elected.
X Incumbent.

==== 1921 General election: Moose Jaw County ====
Saskatchewan General Election, June 9, 1921: Moose Jaw County
Party	Candidate	Popular Vote	%
Liberal	E X Charles Avery Dunning	Acclaimed	–
Total		–	–
Source: Saskatchewan Archives – Election Results by Electoral Division – Moose Jaw County

E Elected.
X Incumbent.

==== 1925 General election: Moose Jaw County ====
Saskatchewan General Election, June 2, 1925: Moose Jaw County
Party	Candidate	Popular Vote	%
Liberal	E X Charles Avery Dunning	2,094	71.5%
Progressive	John Flatekval	835	28.5%
Total		2,929	100.0%
Source: Saskatchewan Archives – Election Results by Electoral Division – Moose Jaw County

E Elected.
X Incumbent.

=== Federal constituency elections, 1926 to 1935 ===
After leaving provincial politics, Dunning stood for election to the House of Commons five times. He was elected to the House of Commons three times in one year, all from Regina, and defeated once. He later was elected from Queen's in Prince Edward Island.

==== 1926 By-election: Regina ====
Federal By-Election, March 16, 1926: Regina, Saskatchewan
Party	Candidate	Popular Vote	%
Liberal	E Charles Avery Dunning	Acclaimed	–
Total		–	–
Source: Library of Parliament: Regina

E Elected.

The by-election was called on the resignation of the sitting Liberal member, Francis Nicholson Darke, to create a vacancy for Dunning.

==== 1926 General election: Regina ====
Federal Election, 1926: Regina, Saskatchewan
Party	Candidate	Popular Vote	%
Liberal	E X Charles Avery Dunning	8,916	52.7%
Conservative	Andrew G. MacKinnon	8,001	47.3%
Total		16,917	100.0%
Source: Library of Parliament: Regina

E Elected.
X Incumbent.

==== 1926 By-election: Regina ====
Federal Ministerial By-Election, November 2, 1926: Regina, Saskatchewan
Party	Candidate	Popular Vote	%
Liberal	E X Charles Avery Dunning	Acclaimed	–
Total		–	–
Source: Library of Parliament: Regina

E Elected.
X Incumbent.

The by-election was called on Dunning accepting a federal Cabinet position, an office of profit under the Crown, on October 5, 1926.

==== 1930 General election: Regina ====
Federal Election, 1930: Regina, Saskatchewan
Party	Candidate	Popular Vote	%
Conservative	E Franklin White Turnbull	14,446	61.6%
Liberal	X Charles Avery Dunning	8,916	38.0%
Independent	Lt. Col. R.A. Carman	82	0.3%
Total		23,444	100.0%
Source: Library of Parliament: Regina

E Elected.
X Incumbent.

==== 1935 By-election: Queen's, Prince Edward Island ====
Federal By-Election, December 30, 1935: Queen's, Prince Edward Island
Party	Candidate	Popular Vote	%
Liberal	E Charles Avery Dunning	Acclaimed	–
Total		–	–
Source: Library of Parliament: Queen's

E Elected.

The by-election was called on the appointment of the incumbent, James Larabee, to an office of profit under the Crown, on December 18, 1935, to give Dunning, who had already been appointed Minister of Finance, the opportunity to re-enter the Commons.

Government offices
Preceded by George Perry Graham	Minister of Railways and Canals (Federal); March 1, 1926–June 28, 1926	Succeeded by Sir Henry Lumley Drayton
Preceded by William Anderson Black	Minister of Railways and Canals (Federal); September 25, 1926–November 25, 1926; November 26, 1926–December 29, 1929 (Acting)	Succeeded by Thomas Crerar
Preceded by James Robb	Minister of Finance (Federal); 1929–1930	Succeeded by Richard Bedford Bennett
Preceded by Edgar Nelson Rhodes	Minister of Finance (Federal); 1935–1939	Succeeded by James Ralston
Academic offices
Preceded by James Armstrong Richardson Sr.	Chancellor of Queen's University at Kingston; 1940–1958	Succeeded by John Bertram Stirling
