= Walter Scott (Canadian politician) =

First premier of Saskatchewan (1867–1938)

The Honourable Walter Scott
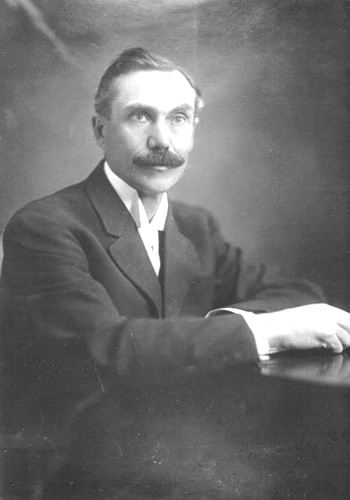

1st Premier of Saskatchewan
- In office September 5, 1905 – October 20, 1916
- Monarchs: Edward VII; George V
- Lieutenant Governor: Amédée E. Forget; George W. Brown; Richard Stuart Lake
- Preceded by: New position
- Succeeded by: William Melville Martin

President of the Executive Council
- In office September 5, 1905 – October 20, 1916
- Preceded by: New position
- Succeeded by: James Alexander Calder

Minister of Public Works
- In office September 12, 1905 – August 19, 1912
- Preceded by: New position
- Succeeded by: Archibald Peter McNab

Commissioner / Minister of Railways
- In office September 19, 1906 – June 12, 1908
- Preceded by: New position
- Succeeded by: James Alexander Calder

Commissioner / Minister of Municipal Affairs
- In office December 10, 1908 – May 9, 1910
- Preceded by: New position
- Succeeded by: Archibald Peter McNab

Minister of Education
- In office August 19, 1912 – October 20, 1916
- Preceded by: James Alexander Calder
- Succeeded by: William Melville Martin

Leader of the Liberal Party of Saskatchewan
- In office August 16, 1905 – October 16, 1916
- Preceded by: New position
- Succeeded by: William Melville Martin

Member of the Legislative Assembly of Saskatchewan for Lumsden
- In office December 13, 1905 – August 14, 1908
- Preceded by: New position
- Succeeded by: Frederick Clarke Tate

Member of the Legislative Assembly of Saskatchewan for Swift Current
- In office August 14, 1908 – June 26, 1917
- Preceded by: New position
- Succeeded by: David John Sykes

Member of the Canadian Parliament for Assiniboia West
- In office November 7, 1900 – December 13, 1905
- Preceded by: Nicholas Flood Davin
- Succeeded by: William Erskine Knowles

Personal details
- Born: October 27, 1867 London Township, Ontario, Canada
- Died: March 23, 1938 (aged 70) Guelph, Ontario
- Cause of death: Blood clot
- Resting place: Royal Oak Cemetery, Victoria, British Columbia
- Party: Saskatchewan Liberal Party
- Other political affiliations: Liberal Party of Canada
- Spouse: Jessie Florence Read (m. 1890)
- Children: One daughter
- Occupation: Journalist
- Profession: Newspaper owner and publisher

Thomas Walter Scott (October 27, 1867 – March 23, 1938) was the first premier of Saskatchewan from 1905 to 1916. Scott was Saskatchewan's second longest-serving Premier, serving one continuous term from 1905 to 1916. He led the Saskatchewan Liberal Party in three general elections, winning all three with majority governments before retiring. He was the first of six Liberal Premiers to date. He was succeeded by William Melville Martin. Scott was also the minister of various departments during his tenure as premier. Prior to the creation of Saskatchewan in 1905, Scott was a Member of Parliament in the federal House of Commons of Canada, elected in the general elections of 1900 and 1904.

As the province’s first leader, he built its administrative framework and governance structures. He prioritized railway expansion and public works, improving rail transportation and connectivity. Scott was instrumental in developing Saskatchewan’s education system, including funding for schools and teacher training as well as a university. He introduced policies to strengthen local governments, ensuring better services for communities. His leadership encouraged agricultural development, helping Saskatchewan become a key player in Canada’s economy.

== Early life ==
Scott was born in 1867 in London Township, Ontario, in rural southwestern Ontario, the child of George Scott and Isabella Telfer. He was born out of wedlock, a fact he kept secret for his entire life. He moved to Portage la Prairie, Manitoba, in 1885, and then – at the age of 19 – to Regina, the capital of the North-West Territories, in 1886. He worked for and then ran a number of newspapers which supported the Liberal Party of Canada.

He became a partner in the Regina Standard from 1892 to 1893. From 1894 to 1895, he was the owner and editor of the Moose Jaw Times. Scott then bought the Regina Leader (known today as the Regina Leader-Post) in 1895, and was its editor until 1900.

During this period, Scott gained a measure of fame as pitcher for a local baseball team.

== Federal politics: Creation of Saskatchewan ==
In 1900, Scott ran as a Liberal in the federal riding of Assiniboia West and was elected to the House of Commons. He was re-elected in 1904. During the discussions about creating provinces out of the North-West Territories, Scott initially supported territorial Premier Frederick Haultain's proposal to create one big province (to be named "Buffalo") out of what is today Alberta and Saskatchewan – but then converted to the two-province option favoured by Sir Wilfrid Laurier's Liberal government.

In February 1905, the federal Government of Canada introduced legislation to create the provinces of Alberta and Saskatchewan effective July 1, 1905 (Dominion Day). Premier Haultain was resolutely opposed to this legislation since 1) he wanted one big province, not two provinces; and 2) under the terms of the legislation, the federal government retained jurisdiction over public land. Haultain's opposition – along with opposition in the Commons to the act's provisions for denominational separate schools – delayed the passage of the bill. It did not receive royal assent as the Saskatchewan Act until July 20. It came into force on September 1, 1905, creating the province of Saskatchewan.

On August 16, 1905, the Liberal Party of Saskatchewan held a leadership convention. Scott was the lone candidate. During his speech to the convention, the new leader of the Saskatchewan Liberals confidently predicted that Saskatchewan would soon become Canada's "banner province".

After the passage of the Saskatchewan Act and the creation of the province, the final step was setting up the government. Frederick Haultain, as the Premier of the North-West Territories, was a natural candidate for being either the first Lieutenant Governor of Saskatchewan or the first Premier. However, Haultain's opposition to the division of the Territories into two provinces, the denial of natural resources, and the Catholic school provisions had led the federal government to mistrust him. Prime Minister Laurier therefore appointed Amédée E. Forget, the Lieutenant Governor of the North-West Territories since 1898, as the first Lieutenant Governor of Saskatchewan. Forget then named the 37-year-old Scott as Premier of Saskatchewan. Some believed that he acted on the advice of Laurier while he was staying with Forget at Government House for the celebration of the creation of Saskatchewan, but Laurier denied having given that advice. The appointment created some controversy, both in the Canadian capital of Ottawa and in Saskatchewan. Scott was sworn into office on September 12, 1905.

== First administration (1905–1908) ==
The new province's first election was held on December 13, 1905. (Scott had arrived in Regina on December 13, 1886, so the day held sentimental value for him.) Scott's Liberals ran under the slogan "Peace, Progress, and Prosperity." Scott easily retained the premiership, with his Liberals winning 16 seats in the provincial legislature, while Haultain's newly created Provincial Rights Party won only 9. (Though the popular vote was closer than this would indicate, with 52% of the vote going to the Liberals and 47% to the PRP.)

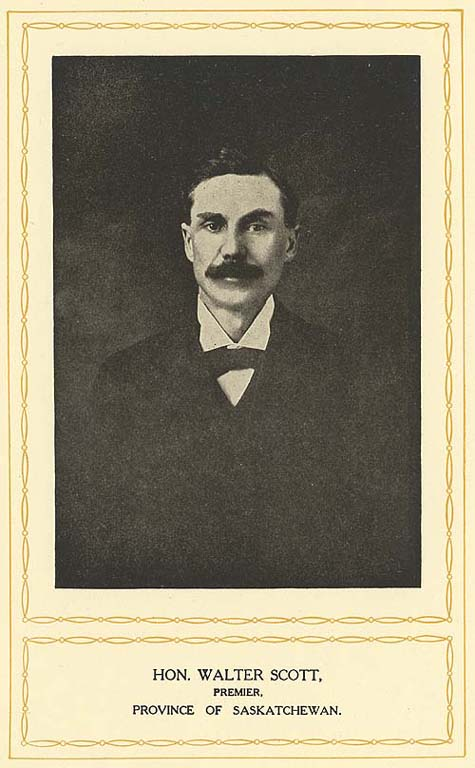
Thomas Walter Scott, Premier of Saskatchewan.

Saskatchewan's first legislative session was convened at the end of March 1906. The major issue dominating this first session was the selection of a capital city. (Regina had only been named temporary capital.) Scott had assumed that Regina would remain the capital, but in May – at a secret meeting of the Liberal caucus – Scott was shocked to learn that two-thirds of his caucus supported moving the capital to Saskatoon. Scott insisted on Regina, though, and his caucus eventually fell in line – when the Liberal MLA from Saskatoon, W.C. Sutherland, introduced a resolution to move the capital to Saskatoon on May 23, 1906, the motion was defeated by a vote of 21–2 in the legislature.

Scott, who was the minister of public works in addition to serving as premier, now began a search for a suitable location for the new Legislative Building. In late June 1906, his cabinet formally approved the location of the current legislature. They agreed to develop the area around the legislature into a public park (Wascana Park), which is today the largest urban park in North America. Following a design competition, the commission for the new Legislative Building was awarded to Maxwells of Montreal in December 1907.

In 1907, Scott appointed the province's first Royal Commission, the Municipal Commission, to study the issue of local government. This resulted in the Rural Municipality Act of 1908–9, which created nearly 300 Rural Municipalities (a form of local government unique to Saskatchewan and Manitoba) which are each 324 square miles (840 km^{2}) in area. During this period, Scott was the first Commissioner, then Minister, for Municipal Affairs, in addition to his duties as premier.

A third major policy initiative during Scott's first premiership involved telephone service. In 1907, the government appointed telephone expert Francis Dagger to study the issue, and the result, in 1908, was Saskatchewan's famous solution of letting rural residents form mutual or co-operative companies to provide local phone services.

The Scott government also concerned itself with transportation. In 1906, the Scott government spent nearly $100,000 on highway construction – a figure which would increase tenfold over the course of Scott's first term in office. During this period, Scott also served as the Commissioner of Railways.

The Scott administration also undertook a major expansion of public education in Saskatchewan. Between 1905 and 1913, the number of public schools jumped from 405 to 2,747. Normal schools were opened in Regina and Saskatoon.

Scott was also very interested in higher education, having promised the creation of a provincial university during the 1905 election campaign. In spring 1907, the legislature passed the University Act, designed to create a university for the province. In August 1908, Walter Murray, a philosophy professor from the Maritimes, was appointed as the first president of the new institution, although the site of the university had not yet been determined.

During the winter of 1906-07, Scott suffered a bout of pneumonia. From this point on, he left the province every fall in search of a warmer setting. In total, he spent approximately half of his tenure as premier outside of the province.

== Second administration (1908 – 1912) ==
In August 1908, Scott was re-elected as premier of Saskatchewan. For this election, the legislature had been expanded to 41 seats, and Scott's Liberals won 27 of these seats. Also in 1908, the Scott government passed the Children's Protection Act to care for neglected and dependent children.

In April 1909, over the opposition of President Murray, the government decided to locate the new University of Saskatchewan in Saskatoon. The university's first classes were held in the Drinkle Building downtown in September 1909, while plans were made to develop the university on the east side of the South Saskatchewan River on land well suited for agricultural research.

Since Scott favoured a policy of decentralization (evidenced in the university going to Saskatoon instead of Regina), he continued this policy. In 1907, he appointed a commission to decide where to locate the provincial insane asylum, with it eventually being built in North Battleford in 1913. Further pursuing his scheme of decentralization, Prince Albert was awarded the provincial penitentiary in 1911.

In October 1909, the Governor General of Canada, the Earl Grey was on hand to lay the cornerstone of the Saskatchewan Legislature, which Premier Scott had recently decided should be made out of Tyndall stone.

Continuing the policy of encouraging the development of transportation facilities, in 1909 the government agreed to back railway construction bonds (up to a limit of $13,000/mile) to encourage the Canadian Northern Railway and the Grand Trunk Pacific Railway to build new lines in Saskatchewan. By the time of the Great War, this programme had created more than 1,000 miles (1,600 km) of new rail track in the province.

In 1910, Scott appointed another royal commission, the Magill Commission, to study the issue of grain elevators. In October, the commission rejected proposals to create government-owned elevators, opting instead for a system of elevators owned and operated co-operatively by farmers.

== Third administration (1912 – 1916) ==
In the 1912 election, the Legislature was expanded again, and Scott's Liberals won 46 of the 54 ridings. By this point, their opposition – the Provincial Rights Party – had decided to re-join mainstream politics and renamed itself the Conservative Party. Haultain resigned as leader in the wake of the 1912 electoral defeat.

Saskatchewan's importance in Confederation and the wider British Empire was confirmed in October 1912 when the Legislative Building was officially opened by Queen Victoria's favourite son Prince Arthur, Duke of Connaught, who was then the Governor General.

Scott also served as Minister of Education in his third administration. In 1913, he introduced legislation to require religious minority ratepayers (i.e. Catholics) to support their own separate schools. This proposal met with fierce opposition from the Rev. Murdoch Mackinnon, pastor of Regina's Knox Presbyterian Church (Scott's own congregation) who was resolutely opposed to measures which would financially strengthen the position of the Roman Catholic Church. Mackinnon would remain a thorn in Scott's side – as late as 1919 fiercely denouncing Scott's compromise position of allowing up to 1 hour a day of French language instruction in public schools.

Another development in 1913 was the creation of a provincial Board of Censors to deal with the corrupting influence of new-fangled motion pictures.

With the commencement of hostilities in World War I, Scott called an emergency session of the Saskatchewan Legislature on September 15, 1914. He pledged that all government MLAs would contribute 10% of their salaries to the Canadian Patriotic Fund, and that the province would donate 1500 horses to the British war effort. The Leader of the Opposition immediately rose to applaud these measures, and the session ended with Liberal and Conservative members joining in a rousing chorus of God Save the King.

Scott had long claimed to be in favour of women's suffrage, but as of 1912, Scott was musing that women didn't really want the vote. Pressed on the matter in early 1914, he said that he didn't feel his government had a mandate from the people to enact such a major change as introducing female suffrage. When, however, in late 1915, Scott learned that Manitoba had enacted women's suffrage, he was quick to follow suit – introducing legislation on February 14, 1916, to allow women to vote.

Scott had longed opposed the prohibition of alcohol, but the war made it all but impossible to resist the pressure of temperance advocates. In a March 1915 speech in Oxbow, Scott announced that all drinking establishments in Saskatchewan would be closed as of July 1, to be replaced by provincially run liquor stores. This move would prove inadequate in the following months, as both Alberta and Manitoba enacted Prohibition. Sensing the sign of the times, Scott held a provincial referendum on the topic – the first time women had been allowed to vote in Saskatchewan – and in December 1916, 80% of Saskatchewan voters voted to ban alcohol in the province.

Scott's departure from politics by this time was virtually certain, for two main reasons. First, he had become increasingly prone to bouts of depression – with his outburst against his own pastor, Murdoch Mackinnon, during the debate about educational policy, serving as indication to his supporters that he was no longer entirely up for the job of premier.

Second, in February 1916, Conservative MLA J.E. Bradshaw alleged in the House that Liberals had been receiving kickbacks for highway work, liquor licences, and public building contracts. A Royal Commission was appointed, and several Liberal backbenchers were indicted and eventually convicted. Amidst the scandal, Scott stepped down as premier on October 16, 1916.

== Electoral history ==
Scott was the second-longest serving Premier of Saskatchewan, with one continuous term, from September 6, 1905, to October 20, 1916. He was in office for a total of 11 years, 45 days. Scott led the provincial Liberals in three general elections, winning majority governments in all three (1905, 1908, 1912).

Scott was elected three times to the Legislative Assembly and twice to the federal House of Commons. He was never defeated at the polls.

Scott is one of only four Saskatchewan premiers to win three or more majority governments, the others being Tommy Douglas, Allan Blakeney, and Brad Wall. Scott and the Liberals won over 50% of the popular vote in each of the three general elections, and also increased their number of seats in the second and third elections. The only other Saskatchewan premier to match this feat to date has been Brad Wall.

=== Saskatchewan general elections, 1905 to 1912 ===
==== 1905 General election ====
The first general election matched Scott and the Liberals against Haultain, former Premier of the North-West Territories, and the Provincial Rights Party. Scott and the Liberals won a substantial majority over Haultain.

Saskatchewan General Election: December 13, 1905
Party	Leaders	Candidates	Seats Won	Popular Vote	Popular Vote Percentage
Liberal	Walter Scott^{1}	25	16	17,812	52.25%
Provincial Rights	Frederick Haultain^{2}	24	9	16,184	47.47%
Independent	–	1	0	94	0.28%
Total		50	25	34,090	100.00%
Source: Elections Saskatchewan – Elections Results – 1905

^{1} Premier of Saskatchewan when election was called; Premier after the election.
^{2} Premier of the North-West Territories prior to creation of Saskatchewan; Leader of the Opposition after the election.

==== 1908 General election ====
Scott again led the Liberal Party in the second general election, on August 14, 1908. Haultain was again his opponent, for the Provincial Rights Party. Scott was returned to office.

Saskatchewan General Election: August 14, 1908
Party	Leaders	Candidates	Seats Won	Popular Vote	Popular Vote Percentage
Liberal	Walter Scott^{1}	41	27	29,807	50.79%
Provincial Rights	Frederick Haultain^{2}	40	14	28,099	47.88%
Independent-Liberal	–	1	0	394	0.67%
Independent	–	2	0	387	0.66%
Total		84	41	58,687	100.00%
Source: Elections Saskatchewan – Elections Results – 1908

^{1} Premier when election was called; Premier after the election.
^{2} Leader of the Opposition when election was called; Leader of the Opposition after the election.

==== 1912 General election ====
Scott again led the Liberal Party in the third general election, on July 11, 1912. The Provincial Rights Party by this time had re-named itself the Conservative Party of Saskatchewan, now led by Wellington Willoughby. Scott was returned to office.

Saskatchewan General Election: July 11, 1912
Party	Leaders	Candidates	Seats Won	Popular Vote	Popular Vote Percentage
Liberal	Walter Scott^{1}	53	45	50,004	56.96%
Conservative	Wellington Willoughby^{2}	53	7	36,848	41.98%
Independent	–	5	1	934	1.06%
Vacant^{3}	–	(1)	(1)	–	–
Total		112	54	87,786	100.00%
Source: Elections Saskatchewan – Elections Results – 1912

^{1} Premier when election was called; Premier after the election.
^{2} Leader of the Opposition when election was called; Leader of the Opposition after the election.
^{3} The Legislative Assembly had 54 seats, but the election in Cumberland was declared void, resulting in a vacancy in the Assembly until a by-election was called on September 8, 1913.

=== Saskatchewan constituency elections ===
Scott stood for election to the Legislative Assembly three times, in two different ridings. He was elected each time.

==== 1905 General election: Lumsden ====
Saskatchewan General Election, 1905: Lumsden
Party	Candidate	Popular Vote	%
Liberal	E Walter Scott	913	56.6%
Provincial Rights	Frederick Clarke Tate	701	43.4%
Total		1,614	100.0%
Source: Saskatchewan Archives – Election Results by Electoral Division

E Elected.

==== 1908 General election: Swift Current ====
Saskatchewan General Election, 1908: Swift Current
Party	Candidate	Popular Vote	%
Liberal	E Walter Scott	699	63.5%
Provincial Rights	William Oswald Smyth	401	36.5%
Total		1,100	100.0%
Source: Saskatchewan Archives – Election Results by Electoral Division

E Elected.

==== 1912 General election: Swift Current ====
Saskatchewan General Election, 1912: Swift Current
Party	Candidate	Popular Vote	%
Liberal	E X Walter Scott	768	57.6%
Conservative	Frank G. Forster	565	42.4%
Total		1,333	100.0%
Source: Saskatchewan Archives – Election Results by Electoral Division

E Elected.
X Incumbent.

=== Federal constituency elections, 1900 and 1904 ===
Scott stood for election to the House of Commons twice, in the riding of Assiniboia West, North-West Territories. He was elected both times.

==== 1900 General election: Assiniboia West ====
1900 Canadian federal election: Assiniboia West
Party	Candidate	Votes	%	±%
Liberal	Walter Scott	2,093	52.93	–
Conservative	Nicholas Flood Davin	1,861	47.07	–2.93
Total valid votes		3,954	100.00	
Total rejected ballots		unknown		
Turnout		3,954	78.69	–1.82
Eligible voters		5,025		
Liberal gain from Conservative		Swing		N/A
Source: Library of Parliament

==== 1904 General election: Assiniboia West ====
1904 Canadian federal election: Assiniboia West
Party	Candidate	Votes	%	±%
Liberal	Walter Scott	3,647	56.00	+3.07
Conservative	George Malcolm Annable	2,865	44.00	–3.07
Total valid votes		6,512	100.00	
Total rejected ballots		unknown		
Turnout		6,512	75.99	–2.70
Eligible voters		8,569		
Liberal hold		Swing		+3.07
Source: Library of Parliament

== Life after public office ==
Scott travelled widely in the years following his departure from public life in 1916. His mental health never allowed him to re-engage in politics or public affairs, nor any significant employment. He ultimately settled in Victoria, British Columbia, with his wife. His mental health did not improve and in 1936 he was committed to a private psychiatric home in Ontario for well-off patients. He died there in 1938 and is buried in Victoria. The circumstances of his death were not made public in Saskatchewan.

== Honours ==
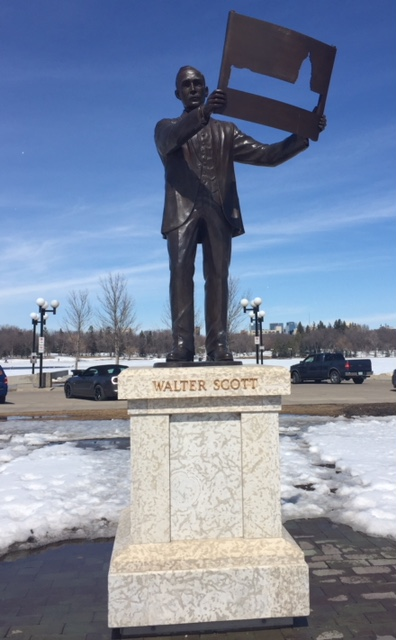
Walter Scott Memorial, Wascana Park

The Walter Scott Memorial was unveiled in 2012 in Wascana Centre, coinciding with the 100th anniversary of the Saskatchewan Legislative Building. The memorial is a full figured bronze statue of Scott facing the Legislative Building, holding a blueprint of the building, which he oversaw construction of while premier.

The Walter Scott Building on Albert Street in Regina was named in Scott's honour, and is the home of many provincial government agencies and departments.

In 2000, Gordon Barnhart, former Lieutenant Governor of Saskatchewan, released the first detailed biography of Walter Scott.

A bust of Scott was commissioned by the provincial government as part of its "Millennial Busts" project.

Scott Collegiate, a high school in Regina, is named after Scott.
