= William Benjamin Bashford =

Canadian politician

William Benjamin Bashford (July 1, 1872 – October 20, 1955) was an English-born merchant, farmer and political figure in Saskatchewan. He represented Rosthern in the Legislative Assembly of Saskatchewan from 1914 to 1921 as a Liberal.

He was born in London, the son of Reverend Bob Bashford and Ellen Mary Brown. After completing his schooling, Bashford worked as a clerk in a wholesale house. He next came to Canada, working with merchants in Morden, Manitoba. In 1898, Bashford moved to Rosthern, Saskatchewan, where he established a store. He married Susan A. Hawkins in 1902. In 1922, Bashford established the Rosthern Creamery and Produce Company. He also farmed and raised sheep and cattle. Bashford served on the Rosthern town council and school board.
