= Thomas Waddell (Saskatchewan politician) =

Canadian politician

Thomas Waddell (April 26, 1886 – 1948) was a Scottish-born farmer and political figure in Saskatchewan. He represented Moose Jaw County from 1926 to 1929 and from 1934 to 1938 in the Legislative Assembly of Saskatchewan as a Liberal.

He was born in Hamilton, Scotland, the son of Thomas Waddell and Betsy Clarkson, and was educated there. Waddell came to Canada in 1906. In 1913, he married Helen Mary Wilkins. Waddell was reeve of the rural municipality of Sutton. He lived in Mossbank, Saskatchewan. He was first elected to the provincial assembly in a 1926 by-election held after Charles Avery Dunning ran for a federal seat. Waddell was defeated by Sinclair Alexander Whittaker when he ran for reelection to the assembly in 1929; he defeated Whittaker in the general election that followed in 1934.
