= Sydney Seymour Simpson =

Canadian politician

Sydney Seymour Simpson (November 18, 1856 – 1939) was an English-born farmer and political figure in Saskatchewan. He represented Battleford in the Legislative Assembly of Saskatchewan from 1908 to 1917 as a Liberal.

He was born in Ledsham, West Yorkshire, the son of Michael H. Simpson. In 1883, he travelled west in Canada, settling in Battleford, Saskatchewan. Simpson married Margaret Ann Speers.
