= Moose Jaw County =

Former provincial electoral district in Saskatchewan, Canada

Coordinates: 50°18′N 105°33′W

Moose Jaw County was a provincial electoral division for the Legislative Assembly of the province of Saskatchewan, Canada. The district was created as "Moose Jaw" before the 1st Saskatchewan general election in 1905. The riding was abolished into the districts of Gravelbourg, Bengough, Notukeu-Willow Bunch, and Milestone before the 9th Saskatchewan general election in 1938. It was the constituency of Premier Charles Avery Dunning.

It is now part of the Thunder Creek, Moose Jaw Wakamow, and Wood River constituencies.

== Members of the Legislative Assembly ==
#	MLA	Served	Party
1.	John Albert Sheppard	1905–1916	Liberal
2.	John Edwin Chisholm	Dec. 1916 – 1917	Conservative
3.	Charles Avery Dunning	1917–1926	Liberal
4.	Thomas Waddell	June 1926 – 1929	Liberal
5.	Sinclair Alexander Whittaker	1929–1934	Conservative
6.	Thomas Waddell	1934–1938	Liberal

== Election results ==
1905 Saskatchewan general election: Moose Jaw
Party	Candidate	Votes	%	±%
Liberal	John Albert Sheppard	759	52.27%	–
Provincial Rights	Samuel K. Rathwell	693	47.73%	–
Total		1,452	100.00%	

1908 Saskatchewan general election: Moose Jaw County
Party	Candidate	Votes	%	±%
Liberal	John Albert Sheppard	1,129	50.45%	-1.82
Provincial Rights	Henry Dorrell	1,109	49.55%	+1.82
Total		2,238	100.00%	

1912 Saskatchewan general election: Moose Jaw County
Party	Candidate	Votes	%	±%
Liberal	John Albert Sheppard	973	61.00%	+10.55
Conservative	Fred W. Green	622	39.00%	-10.55
Total		1,595	100.00%	

December 5, 1916 By-Election: Moose Jaw County
Party	Candidate	Votes	%	±%
Conservative	John Edwin Chisholm	2,148	51.07%	+12.07
Independent Liberal	John Albert Sheppard	2,058	48.93%	-12.07
Total		4,206	100.00%	

1917 Saskatchewan general election: Moose Jaw County
Party	Candidate	Votes	%	±%
Liberal	Charles Avery Dunning	3,316	64.63%	-
Conservative	John Edwin Chisholm	1,815	35.37%	-15.70
Total		5,131	100.00%	

1921 Saskatchewan general election: Moose Jaw County
Party	Candidate	Votes	%	±%
Liberal	Charles Avery Dunning	Acclaimed	100.00%	
Total		Acclamation		

1925 Saskatchewan general election: Moose Jaw County
Party	Candidate	Votes	%	±%
Liberal	Charles Avery Dunning	2,094	71.49%	-
Progressive	John Flatekval	835	28.51%	–
Total		2,929	100.00%	

May 25, 1926 By-Election: Moose Jaw County
Party	Candidate	Votes	%	±%
Liberal	Thomas Waddell	Acclaimed	100.00%	
Total		Acclamation		

1929 Saskatchewan general election: Moose Jaw County
Party	Candidate	Votes	%	±%
Conservative	Sinclair Alexander Whittaker	2,381	50.95%	-
Liberal	Thomas Waddell	2,292	49.05%	-
Total		4,673	100.00%	

1934 Saskatchewan general election: Moose Jaw County
Party	Candidate	Votes	%	±%
Liberal	Thomas Waddell	2,500	47.27%	-1.78
Farmer-Labour	Henry Milne	1,714	32.41%	+32.41
Independent	Sinclair Whittaker	1,075	20.32%	-30.63
Total		5,289	100.00%	

== See also ==
- List of Saskatchewan provincial electoral districts
- List of Saskatchewan general elections
- Canadian provincial electoral districts
- Moose Jaw — North-West Territories territorial electoral district (1870–1905)
