= North Qu'Appelle =

Former provincial electoral district in Saskatchewan, Canada

Coordinates: 50°52′N 103°40′W

North Qu'Appelle is a former provincial electoral division for the Legislative Assembly of the province of Saskatchewan, Canada. The district was created before the 1st Saskatchewan general election in 1905, and abolished before the 8th Saskatchewan general election in 1934 into Melville and Touchwood. It is now part of Last Mountain-Touchwood and Regina Wascana Plains. It was the riding of Premier James Garfield Gardiner.

== Members of the Legislative Assembly ==
#	MLA	Served	Party
1.	William Richard Motherwell	1905–1908	Liberal
2.	John Archibald McDonald	1908–1912	Provincial Rights
3.	John Archibald McDonald	1912–1914	Conservative
4.	James Garfield Gardiner	Aug. 1914 – 1934	Liberal

== Election results ==
1905 Saskatchewan general election: North Qu'Appelle
Party	Candidate	Votes	%	±%
Liberal	William Richard Motherwell	872	56.62%	–
Provincial Rights	Henry Noble Rutledge	668	43.38%	–
Total		1,540	100.00%	

1908 Saskatchewan general election: North Qu'Appelle
Party	Candidate	Votes	%	±%
Provincial Rights	John Archibald McDonald	990	53.86%	+10.48
Liberal	William Richard Motherwell	848	46.14%	-10.48
Total		1,838	100.00%	

1912 Saskatchewan general election: North Qu'Appelle
Party	Candidate	Votes	%	±%
Conservative	John Archibald McDonald	882	51.31%	-2.55
Liberal	John Adam McLaughlin	837	48.69%	+2.55
Total		1,719	100.00%	

June 25, 1914 By-Election: North Qu'Appelle
Party	Candidate	Votes	%	±%
Liberal	James Garfield Gardiner	1,171	56.79%	+8.10
Conservative	William Ernest Read	891	43.21%	-8.10
Total		2,062	100.00%	

1917 Saskatchewan general election: North Qu'Appelle
Party	Candidate	Votes	%	±%
Liberal	James Garfield Gardiner	1,827	59.49%	+2.70
Conservative	George Wilson Balfour	1,244	40.51%	-2.70
Total		3,071	100.00%	

1921 Saskatchewan general election: North Qu'Appelle
Party	Candidate	Votes	%	±%
Liberal	James Garfield Gardiner	Acclaimed	100.00%	
Total		Acclaimation		

June 5, 1922 By-Election: North Qu'Appelle
Party	Candidate	Votes	%	±%
Liberal	James Garfield Gardiner	Acclaimed	100.00%	
Total		Acclaimation		

1925 Saskatchewan general election: North Qu'Appelle
Party	Candidate	Votes	%	±%
Liberal	James Garfield Gardiner	2,370	60.71%	-
Progressive	Caleb H. Fisher	1,534	39.29%	–
Total		3,904	100.00%	

1929 Saskatchewan general election: North Qu'Appelle
Party	Candidate	Votes	%	±%
Liberal	James Garfield Gardiner	2,752	59.79%	-0.92
Conservative	Walter Weston	1,448	31.46%	+31.46
Progressive	Richard McSweeney	403	8.75%	-30.54
Total		4,603	100.00%	

== See also ==
- List of Saskatchewan provincial electoral districts
- List of Saskatchewan general elections
- Canadian provincial electoral districts
- North Qu'Appelle — North-West Territories territorial electoral district (1870–1905)
