= John Albert Sheppard =

Canadian politician

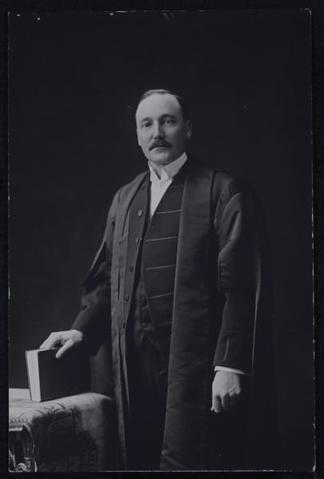
John Albert Sheppard, Speaker of the Legislature, 1912-1917, in his official uniform

John Albert Sheppard (September 1, 1875 – July 31, 1947) was an educator, farmer and political figure in Saskatchewan, Canada. He represented Moose Jaw County in the Legislative Assembly of Saskatchewan from 1905 to 1916 as a Liberal. He died July 31, 1947.

== Early life and education ==
He was born in Mount Forest, Ontario in 1875, the son of Irish immigrant John Sheppard and Margaret Reid. John Albert Shepard has at least 3 siblings (David Nelson Sheppard, Emma Alberta Shepard and Thomas James Sheppard). Sheppard was educated in Mount Forest and at the normal school in Toronto. Sheppard taught school in Ontario and in the Moose Jaw district. In 1896, he married Florence Herring and had 3 children.

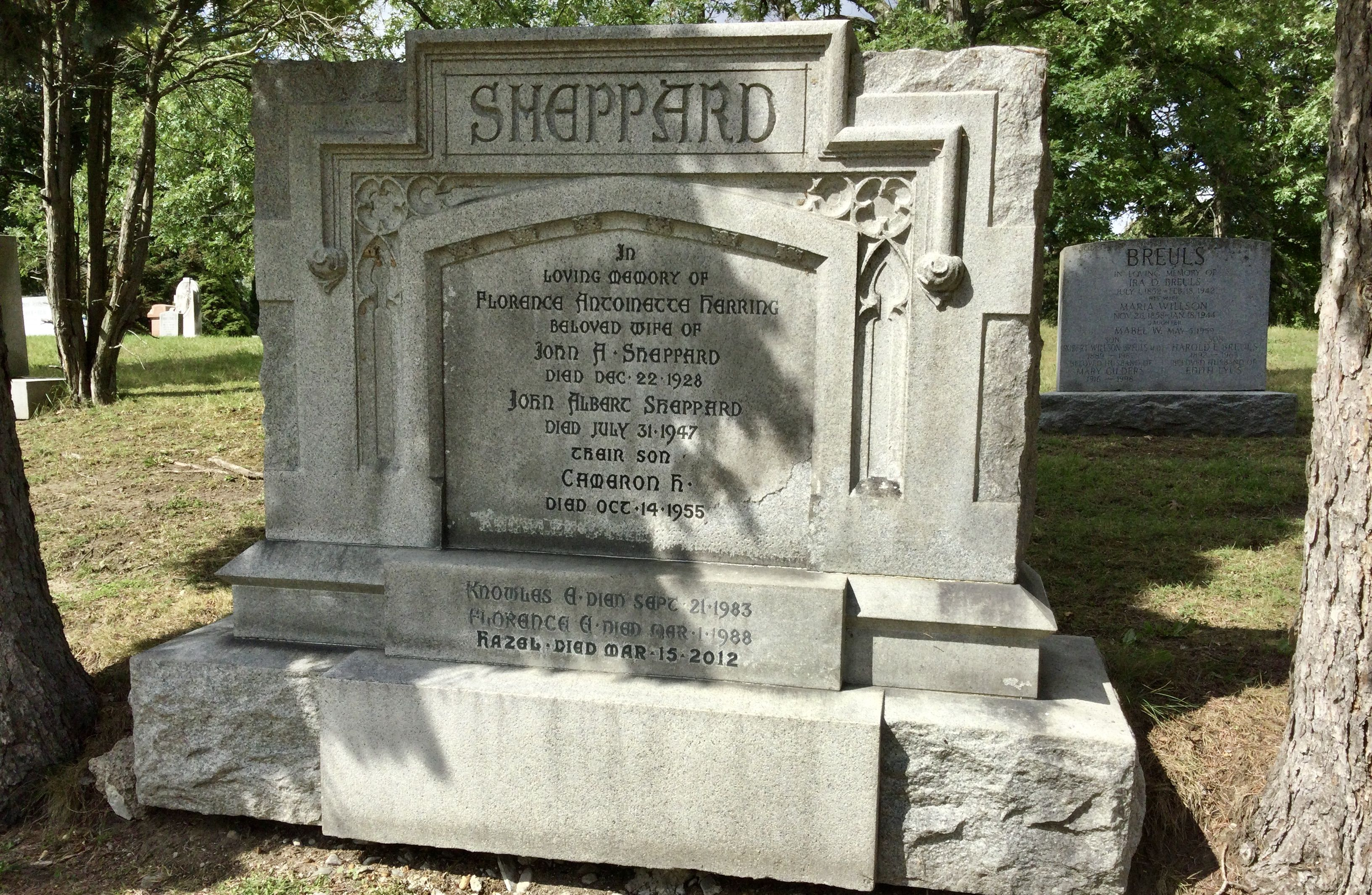
John Albert Sheppard's grave in Park Lawn Cemetery

== Political career ==
Sheppard was speaker for the Saskatchewan assembly from 1912 to 1916. He was defeated by John Edwin Chisholm in a 1916 by-election requested by Sheppard to "give him the opportunity of vindicating his character by an appeal to the people". Sheppard was reacting to the findings of a Royal Commission which found him guilty on two charges of receiving money in return for liquor licenses.

== Curling achievements ==
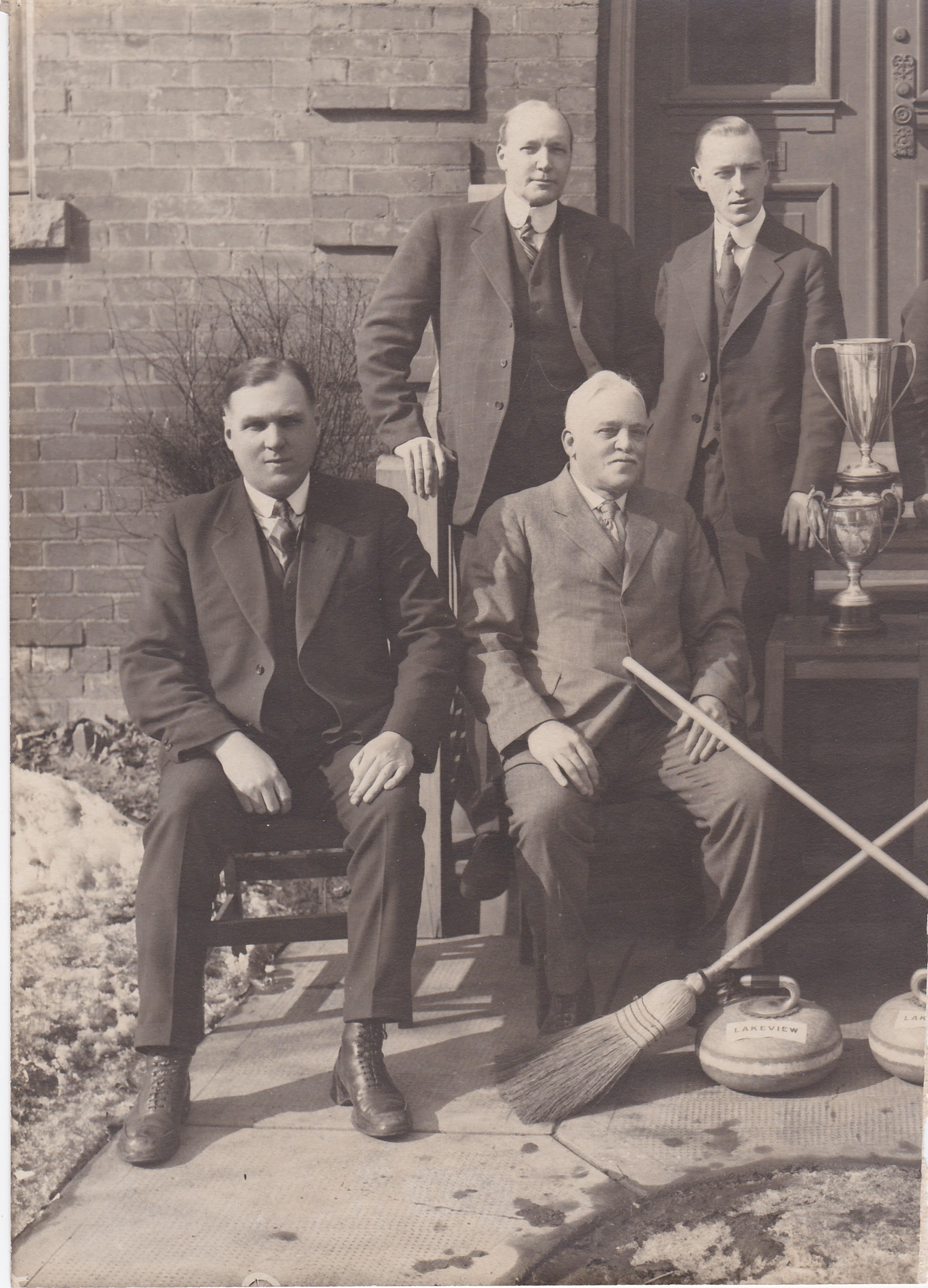
Lakeview Curling Club (1926). John Albert Sheppard (top left) beside brother Thomas James Sheppard (bottom right)

Sheppard was also an active and accomplished curler. He was part of the winning team in the Grand Challenge at the Regina Bonspiel in 1909. The winning team also included Dr. R.M. Mitchell from Weyburn, J.D. Stewart from Arcola, and G.A. Scott from Davidson.

In 1926, Sheppard's team won the Governor General's Trophy – District Cup, with the Lakeview Curling Club.
