= James Garfield Gardiner =

Premier of Saskatchewan from 1926 to 1929 and 1934 to 1935

The Right Honourable James Garfield Gardiner PC
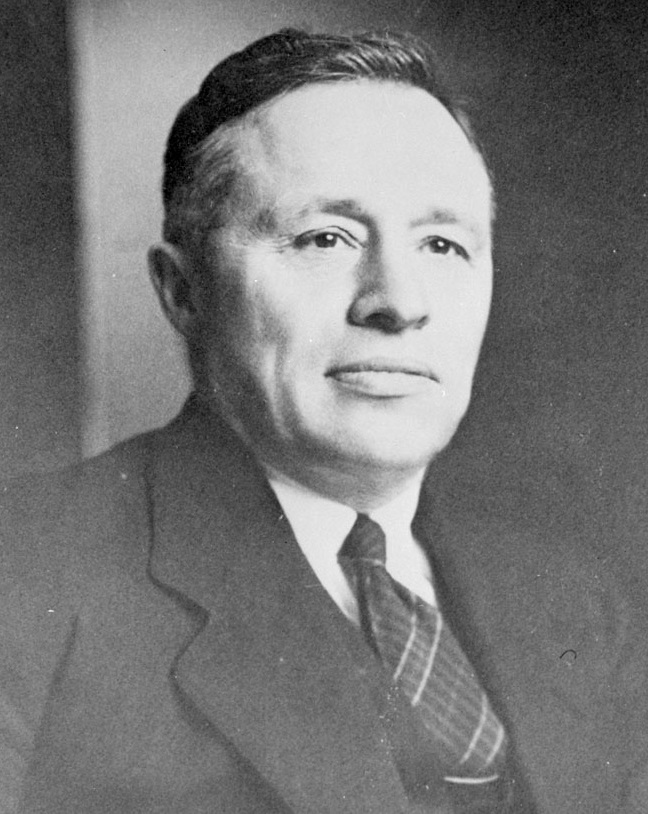

4th Premier of Saskatchewan
- In office February 26, 1926 – September 9, 1929
- Monarch: George V
- Lieutenant Governor: Henry William Newlands
- Preceded by: Charles A. Dunning
- Succeeded by: James T.M. Anderson
- In office July 19, 1934 – November 1, 1935
- Monarch: George V
- Lieutenant Governor: Hugh Edwin Munroe
- Preceded by: James T.M. Anderson
- Succeeded by: William John Patterson

Minister of Agriculture
- In office 3 November 1935 – 21 June 1957
- Prime Minister: William Lyon Mackenzie King; Louis St. Laurent
- Preceded by: Thomas Crerar
- Succeeded by: Douglas Harkness

Member of the Legislative Assembly of Saskatchewan for North Qu'Appelle
- In office June 25, 1914 – June 19, 1934
- Preceded by: John Archibald McDonald
- Succeeded by: District abolished

Member of the Legislative Assembly of Saskatchewan for Melville
- In office June 19, 1934 – November 1, 1935
- Preceded by: District established
- Succeeded by: Ernest Walter Gerrand

Member of the Canadian Parliament for Assiniboia
- In office January 6, 1936 – March 26, 1940
- Preceded by: Robert McKenzie
- Succeeded by: Jesse Pickard Tripp

Member of the Canadian Parliament for Melville
- In office March 26, 1940 – March 31, 1958
- Preceded by: William Richard Motherwell
- Succeeded by: James Norris Ormiston

Personal details
- Born: November 30, 1883 Farhuquar (South Huron), Ontario
- Died: January 12, 1962 (aged 78) Balcarres, Saskatchewan
- Party: Saskatchewan Liberal
- Other political affiliations: Liberal
- Spouses: Rosetta Jane Gardiner (m. 1912–1917) Violet McEwen (m. 1917–1944) Isabella (Scott) Christie (m. 1944–1962)
- Profession: Farmer, educator
- Nickname: Jimmy

James Garfield Gardiner PC (30 November 1883 – 12 January 1962) was a Canadian farmer, educator, and politician. He served as the fourth premier of Saskatchewan and as a minister in the Canadian Cabinet.

== Political career ==
Gardiner was first elected to the Legislative Assembly of Saskatchewan in 1914, served as Minister of Highways (1922–1926) in the government of Premier Charles A. Dunning from 1922, and succeeded Dunning as premier in 1926. A highly-partisan Liberal, his government lost its majority in the legislature in the 1929 election both from patronage scandals and partly through an anti-French, anti-Catholic and anti-immigrant campaign waged by the Ku Klux Klan. Although the Conservative Party had won fewer seats, it was able to defeat the Gardiner government through a motion of no confidence and then formed a "co-operative government" with the support of some Progressive Party and independent Members of the Legislative Assembly.

As Leader of the Opposition, Gardiner accused James Anderson's Conservative government of bigotry and alleged that it was linked with the Klan. Gardiner defeated Anderson in the 1934 election and became premier a second time. In 1935, he was involved in negotiations to end the On-to-Ottawa Trek in Regina.

Gardiner left provincial politics later in 1935 to join the federal cabinet of Liberal Prime Minister William Lyon Mackenzie King as Minister of Agriculture. He was elected to the House of Commons a few months later. Gardiner held the agriculture portfolio for 22 years until the 1957 federal election resulted the Liberal government bring defeated. Gardiner also served as the first Minister of National War Services, during July 12, 1940 – June 10, 1941. Gardiner was a powerful figure in both the King and St. Laurent governments. As a member of King's Cabinet, Gardiner was instrumental in advocating for the appointment of James Wilfred Estey to the Supreme Court of Canada. Estey previously served in Gardiner's cabinet.

In 1947, he was sworn of the Imperial Privy Council, which allowed him use of the prenominal honorific The Right Honourable.

Gardiner ran for the leadership of the Liberal Party of Canada at the 1948 Liberal leadership convention but lost to Louis St. Laurent. He remained in the House of Commons of Canada until he lost his seat in the 1958 Diefenbaker sweep.

== Personal life ==
Gardiner was married three times: first to Rosetta Jane Gardiner in 1912, then to Violet McEwen in 1917 and finally to Isabella (Scott) Christie in 1944. His son James Wilfrid Gardiner served in the Saskatchewan Legislative Assembly. His other son, Pilot Officer John Edwin (1919–1942), serving with Number 403 Squadron, RCAF, was killed in action while providing air cover and support during the Dieppe Raid on August 19, 1942. The Gardiner family farm was near Lemberg, Saskatchewan.

== Legacy ==
As premier of Saskatchewan in 1928, Gardiner championed the Saskatchewan Sanitoria and Hospitals Act, the first legislation to provide free hospitalization and treatment for victims of tuberculosis anywhere in North America. It was passed unanimously by the provincial legislature on January 1, 1929, and is probably one of his least-known legacies to Saskatchewan public policy.

As Minister of National War Services during World War II, Gardiner made a way for conscientious objectors in Canada to perform alternate, non-military service. After deputy ministers stymied a delegation from Canada's Anabaptist peace churches, they approached Gardiner directly, where they got a much warmer reception; as Gardiner was a member of the United Church of Canada, which is also theologically committed to global peace. The National War Services Regulations were amended by Parliament on December 24, 1940, to allow for alternate service.

Saskatchewan's Gardiner Dam, declared open on June 21, 1967, is named after him.

In 2006, the CBC agreed to pull the movie Prairie Giant: The Tommy Douglas Story from all broadcasts in response to criticism about its portrayals of Gardiner.

== Electoral history ==
=== Saskatchewan general elections, 1929 and 1934 ===
Gardiner led the Liberal Party in two general elections, in 1929 and 1934. The 1929 election resulted in a Conservative minority government, but Gardiner won the 1934 election with a majority government.

==== 1929 general election ====
Gardiner had succeeded Dunning as premier in 1926 and led the Liberals into the general election in 1929. Although Gardiner and the Liberals won pluralities in the popular vote and seats in the Assembly, they did not hold a majority. Gardiner chose to face the Assembly in hopes of obtaining sufficient support from some of the opposition members to maintain his government, but he lost a vote on a confidence matter and resigned. He was replaced as premier by James Anderson, whose Conservative Party held the second-greatest number of seats.

Saskatchewan general election: June 6, 1929
Party	Leaders	Seats Won	Popular Vote	Popular Vote Percentage
Liberal	James Garfield Gardiner^{1}	28	164,487	45.56%
Conservative	James Anderson^{2}	24	131,550	36.44%
Independent	–	6	32,729	9.06%
Progressive	–	5	24,988	6.92%
Liberal–Labour	–	0	4,181	1.16%
Economic Group	–	0	1,942	0.54%
Independent Liberal	–	0	1,160	0.32%
Total		63	361,037	100.00%
Source: Elections Saskatchewan — Elections Results — 1929

^{1} Premier when election was called; lost confidence motion in the Assembly after the election; resigned as Premier and became Leader of the Opposition.
^{2} Co-Leader of the Opposition when the election was called; became Premier after successful non-confidence vote.

==== 1934 general election ====
Gardiner remained leader of the Liberals and led them into the 1934 election, at the depths of the Great Depression. The Liberals won a substantial majority government, taking fifty of the fifty-five seats in the Legislative Assembly. The election was a crushing defeat for the Conservatives under Anderson, who failed to win a single seat. The Farmer-Labour Party won five seats and formed the Opposition.

Saskatchewan general election: June 19, 1934
Party	Leaders	Seats Won	Popular Vote	Popular Vote Percentage
Liberal	James Garfield Gardiner^{1}	50	206,212	48.00%
Farmer-Labour	M. J. Coldwell^{2}	5	102,944	23.96%
Conservative	James Anderson^{3}	0	114,923	26.75%
Independent	–	0	2,949	0.69%
Labour	–	0	1,420	0.33%
United Front	–	0	1,053	0.24%
Independent Liberal	–	0	133	0.03%
Total		55	429,634	100.00%
Source: Elections Saskatchewan — Elections Results — 1934

^{1} Leader of the Opposition when election was called; Premier after the election.
^{2} Party leader during the election, but failed to win seat; role as Leader of the Opposition taken by George Hara Williams
^{3} Premier when election was called; lost seat in the election and retired.

=== Saskatchewan constituency elections ===
Gardiner stood for election to the Legislative Assembly seven times, once in a by-election and in six general elections. He was elected six times in the constituency of North Qu'Appelle, and the seventh and last election in the constituency of Melville. He was elected twice by acclamation, and five times in contested elections.

==== 1914 By-election: North Qu'Appelle ====
Provincial By-Election, June 25, 1914: North Qu'Appelle
Party	Candidate	Popular Vote	%
Liberal	E James Garfield Gardiner	1,171	56.79%
Conservative	William Ernest Read	891	43.21%
Total		2,062	100.00%
Source: Saskatchewan Archives — Election Results by Electoral Division — North Qu'Appelle

The by-election was called on the resignation of the sitting Conservative member, John Archibald McDonald, who admitted to "corrupt practices" by his agent in the 1912 general election.

E Elected.

==== 1917 general election: North Qu'Appelle ====
Saskatchewan general election, June 26, 1917: North Qu'Appelle
Party	Candidate	Popular Vote	%
Liberal	E X James Garfield Gardiner	1,827	59.49%
Conservative	George Wilson Balfour	1,244	40.51%
Total		3,071	100.00%
Source: Saskatchewan Archives — Election Results by Electoral Division — North Qu'Appelle

E Elected.
X Incumbent.

==== 1921 general election: North Qu'Appelle ====
Saskatchewan general election, June 9, 1921: North Qu'Appelle
Party	Candidate	Popular Vote	%
Liberal	E X James Garfield Gardiner	Acclaimed	–
Total		–	–
Source: Saskatchewan Archives — Election Results by Electoral Division — North Qu'Appelle

E Elected.
X Incumbent.

==== 1922 By-election: North Qu'Appelle ====
Provincial Ministerial By-Election, June 5, 1922: North Qu'Appelle
Party	Candidate	Popular Vote	%
Liberal	E X James Garfield Gardiner	Acclaimed	–
Total		–	–
Source: Saskatchewan Archives — Election Results by Electoral Division — North Qu'Appelle

The by-election was called on Gardiner accepting the position of Minister of Highways in the Cabinet of Premier Dunning, an office of profit under the Crown, on April 5, 1922.
E Elected.
X Incumbent.

==== 1925 general election: North Qu'Appelle ====
Saskatchewan general election, June 2, 1925: North Qu'Appelle
Party	Candidate	Popular Vote	%
Liberal	E X James Garfield Gardiner	2,370	60.71%
Progressive	Caleb H. Fisher	1,534	39.29%
Total		3,904	100.00%
Source: Saskatchewan Archives — Election Results by Electoral Division — North Qu'Appelle

E Elected.
X Incumbent.

==== 1929 general election: North Qu'Appelle ====
Saskatchewan general election, June 6, 1929: North Qu'Appelle
Party	Candidate	Popular Vote	%
Liberal	E X James Garfield Gardiner	2,752	59.79%
Conservative	Walter Weston	1,448	31.46%
Progressive	Richard McSweeney	403	8.75%
Total		4,603	100.00%
Source: Saskatchewan Archives — Election Results by Electoral Division — North Qu'Appelle

E Elected.
X Incumbent.

==== 1934 general election: Melville ====
Saskatchewan general election, June 19, 1934: Melville
Party	Candidate	Popular Vote	%
Liberal	E X James Garfield Gardiner	4,989	59.23%
Conservative	Elisha Forest Scharf	1,930	22.91%
Farmer–Labour	Wilfrid Wass	1,504	17.86%
Total		8,423	100.00%
Source: Saskatchewan Archives — Election Results by Electoral Division — Melville

E Elected.
X Incumbent.

=== Federal constituency elections, 1936 to 1958 ===
Gardiner stood for election to the House of Commons seven times from 1936 to 1958, in two different Saskatchewan ridings (Assiniboia originally, and then Melville for the next six elections). He was elected six times. After his defeat in the 1958 election, he retired from politics.

==== 1936 by-election: Assiniboia ====
Federal by-election, 1936: Assiniboia, Saskatchewan
Party	Candidate	Popular Vote	%
Liberal	E James Garfield Gardiner	7,282	66.21%
Co-operative Commonwealth Federation	William Irvine	3,717	33.79%
Total		10,999	100.00%
Source: Library of Parliament: Assiniboia

By-election called after the sitting Liberal MP, Robert McKenzie, accepted an office of profit under the Crown on December 9, 1935.

E Elected.

==== 1940 general election: Melville ====
Federal election, 1940: Melville, Saskatchewan
Party	Candidate	Popular Vote	%
Liberal	E James Garfield Gardiner	10,158	48.29%
Co-operative Commonwealth Federation	Louise Lucas	9,042	42.98%
National Unity	Gilbert Henry Bartlett	1,837	8.73%
Total		21,037	100.00%
Source: Library of Parliament: Melville

E Elected.

==== 1945 general election: Melville ====
Federal election, 1945: Melville, Saskatchewan
Party	Candidate	Popular Vote	%
Liberal	E X James Garfield Gardiner	10,095	50.07%
Co-operative Commonwealth Federation	Helmer John Benson	10,067	49.93%
Total		20,162	100.00%
Source: Library of Parliament: Melville

E Elected.
X Incumbent.

==== 1949 general election: Melville ====
Federal election, 1949: Melville, Saskatchewan
Party	Candidate	Popular Vote	%
Liberal	E X James Garfield Gardiner	11,120	58.61%
Co-operative Commonwealth Federation	William James Arthurs	6,388	33.67%
Progressive Conservative	Thomas William Drever	1,465	7.72%
Total		18,973	100.00%
Source: Library of Parliament: Melville

E Elected.
X Incumbent.

==== 1953 general election: Melville ====
Federal election, 1953: Melville, Saskatchewan
Party	Candidate	Popular Vote	%
Liberal	E X James Garfield Gardiner	10,024	50.02%
Co-operative Commonwealth Federation	Percy Ellis Wright	8,092	40.38%
Progressive Conservative	James Norris Ormiston	1,142	5.70%
Social Credit	Louis Wendell	783	3.91%
Total		20,041	100.01%^{1}
Source: Library of Parliament: Melville

E Elected.
X Incumbent.
^{1} Rounding error.

==== 1957 general election: Melville ====
Federal election, 1957: Melville, Saskatchewan
Party	Candidate	Popular Vote	%
Liberal	E X James Garfield Gardiner	7,949	40.63%
Co-operative Commonwealth Federation	John Burton	7,590	38.80%
Progressive Conservative	James Norris Ormiston	2,596	13.27%
Social Credit	David Mercier	1,429	7.30%
Total		19,564	100.00%
Source: Library of Parliament: Melville

E Elected.
X Incumbent.

==== 1958 general election: Melville ====
Federal election, 1958: Melville, Saskatchewan
Party	Candidate	Popular Vote	%
Progressive Conservative	E James Norris Ormiston	8,440	42.60%
Co-operative Commonwealth Federation	John Burton	5,698	28.76%
Liberal	X James Garfield Gardiner	5,673	28.64%
Total		19,811	100.00%
Source: Library of Parliament: Melville

E Elected.
X Incumbent.

Party political offices
Preceded by Charles A. Dunning	Leader of the Liberal Party of Saskatchewan; 1926–1935	Succeeded by William John Patterson
