= John Archibald McDonald (Saskatchewan politician) =

Canadian politician

John Archibald McDonald (August 1865 – 1929) was a banker and political figure in Saskatchewan, Canada. He represented North Qu'Appelle in the Legislative Assembly of Saskatchewan from 1908 to 1914 as a Provincial Rights and then Conservative member.

He was born in Winnipeg, Rupert's Land, the son of Archibald McDonald, chief factor for the Hudson's Bay Company, and was educated at St. John's College in Winnipeg. In 1887, McDonald married Elleonora Campbell, the daughter of Robert Campbell. He resigned from the assembly in 1914 after admitting to "corrupt practices on the part of his agent" during the 1912 election.
