= Donald Finlayson =

Canadian politician

Donald Matheson Finlayson (August 9, 1854 – September 30, 1934) was a farmer and political figure in Saskatchewan, Canada. He represented North Battleford from 1908 to 1917 and Jack Fish Lake from 1917 to 1934 in the Legislative Assembly of Saskatchewan as a Liberal.

He was born in Elgin County, Canada West, the son of Duncan Finlayson and Annabel Matheson, both natives of Scotland. He moved to Battleford, Saskatchewan in 1879. In 1881, Finlayson married his wife, Katie. Their home was ravaged during the North-West Rebellion of 1885 but the family were not at home, having been warned in advance. Finlayson served with local militia during the rebellion. He was president of the North Battleford Agricultural Society.
