= George Alexander Bell =

Canadian politician (1856–1927)

George Alexander Bell (August 3, 1856 – September 13, 1927) was a blacksmith and political figure in Saskatchewan. He represented Estevan in the Legislative Assembly of Saskatchewan from 1908 to 1918 as a Liberal.

He was born in Brant County, Canada West, the son of David Bell, a native of Scotland, and was educated in Colborne township in Huron County. He apprenticed as a blacksmith and came west to Winnipeg in 1882, where he worked for the Canadian Pacific Railway. In 1883, Bell married Elizabeth Smith. After leaving the railway, he established a blacksmith shop in Melita, Manitoba. In 1900, he moved to Saskatchewan to work as a Dominion lands inspector for the Estevan district. He settled in Estevan, Saskatchewan. Bell served in the provincial cabinet as Provincial Treasurer and Minister of Telephones. He played an important role in establishing the early telephone infrastructure in rural Saskatchewan. After resigning from the assembly in 1918, Bell served as chairman of the Local Government Board until 1926. He later was a director for the Anti-Tuberculosis League and was governor of the provincial sanatorium at Fort Qu'Appelle. Bell died in Regina at the age of 71.
