= Shaunavon, Saskatchewan =

Town in Saskatchewan, Canada

Shaunavon
- Town
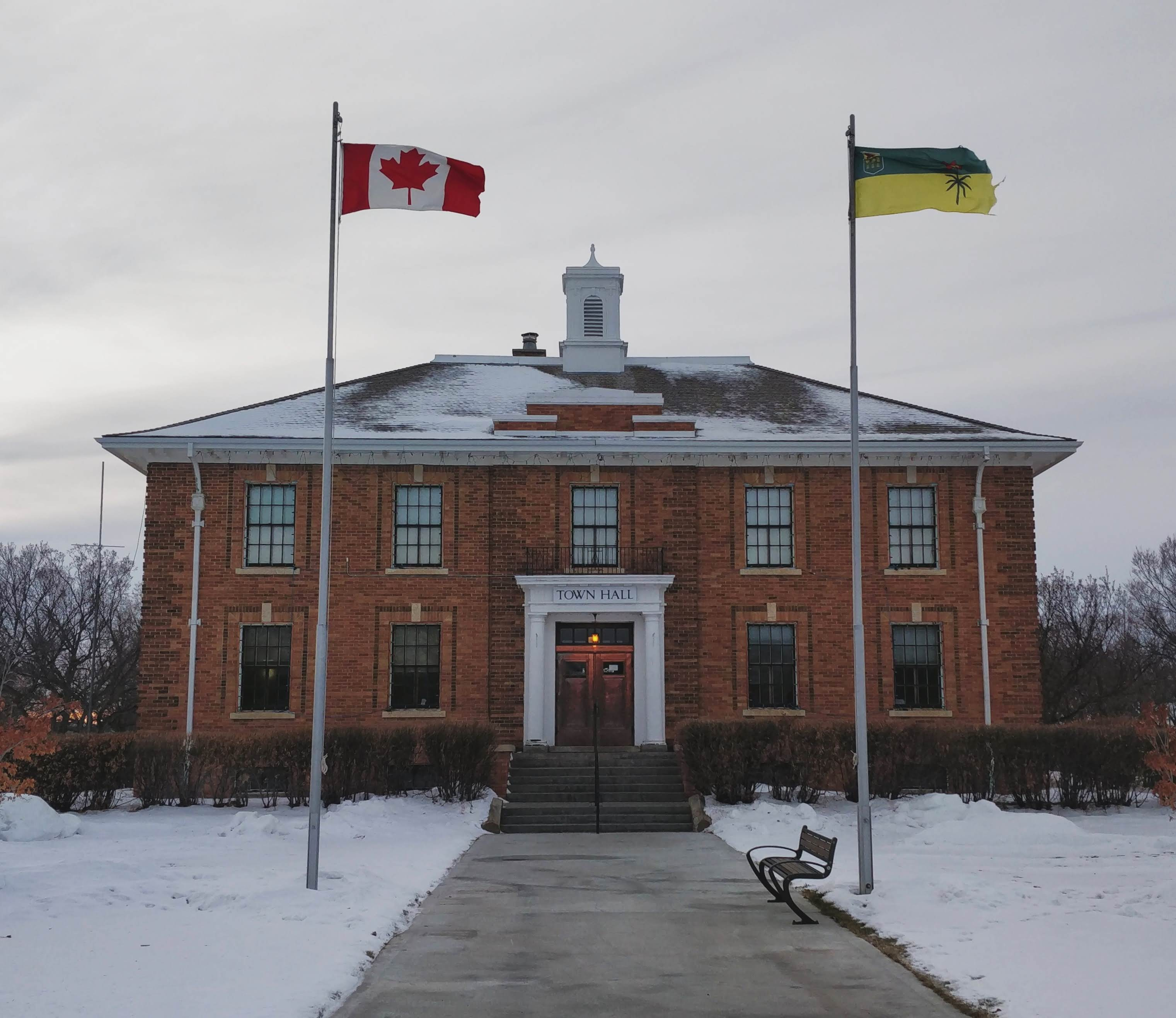
- Historic town hall
- Nicknames: Bone Creek Basin, Boomtown
- Motto: Oasis of the Prairies
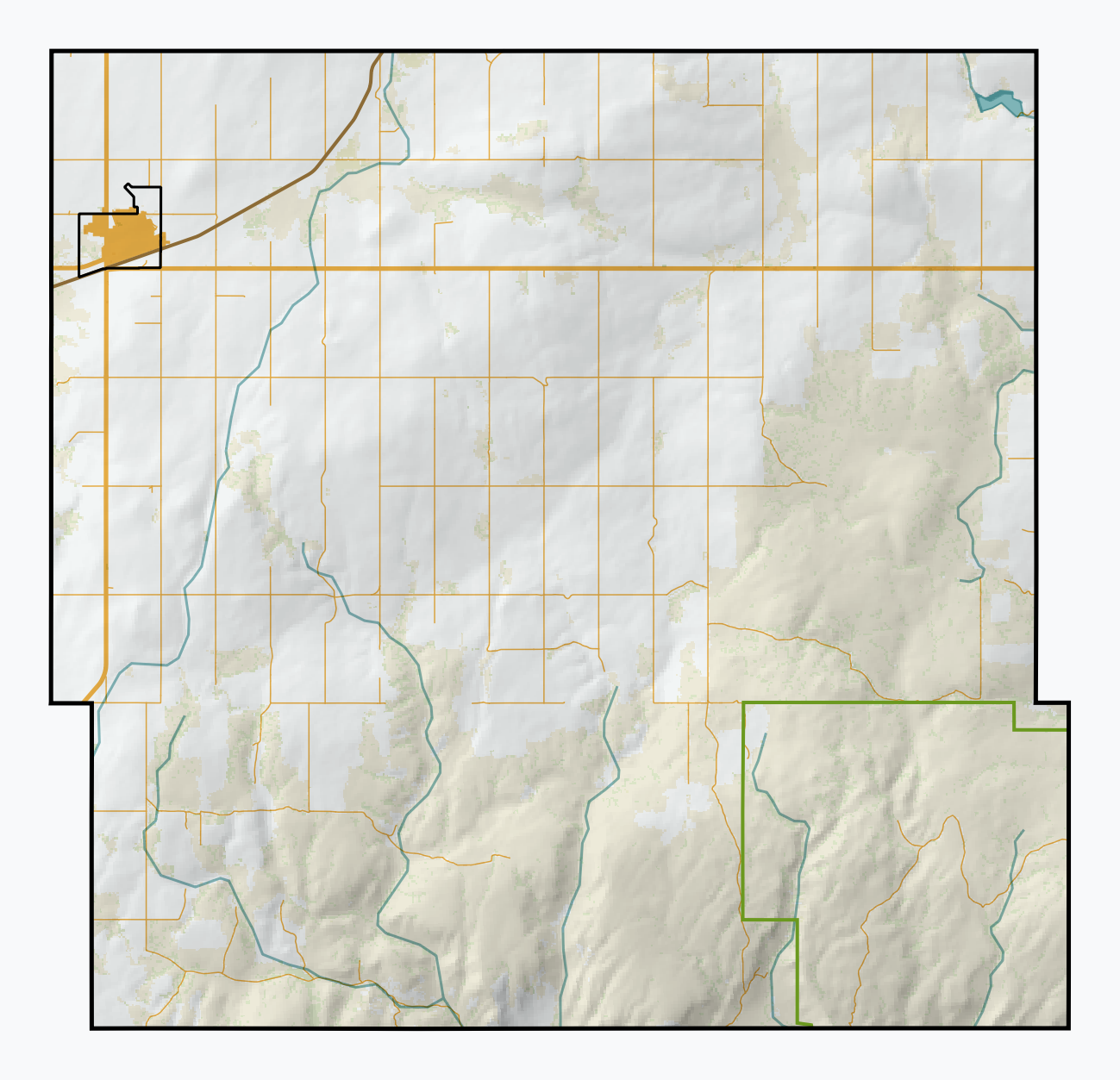
- Location within Saskatchewan Location within Grassy Creek No. 78
- Coordinates: 49°39′1″N 108°24′58″W
- Country: Canada
- Province: Saskatchewan
- Rural municipality: Grassy Creek No. 78
- Post office established: 1913
- Incorporated (village): 1913
- Incorporated (town): 1914

Government
  - Mayor: Cal Vance
  - Administrator: Edna Laturnus Interim CAO
  - Governing body: Shaunavon Town Council
  - MLA: Doug Steele
  - MP: Jeremy Patzer

Area
  - Total: 4.80 km^{2} (1.85 sq mi)
- Elevation: 916 m (3,005 ft)

Population (2021)
  - Total: 1,784
  - Density: 371.7/km^{2} (963/sq mi)
- Time zone: CST
- Postal code: S0N 2M0
- Area code: 306
- Highways: Highway 13; Highway 37; Highway 722
- Industries: Agriculture; Oil; Tourism
- Climate: Dfb
- Website: shaunavon.com

Shaunavon (/ˈʃɔːnəvɪn/ SHAW-nə-vin) is a town in southwest Saskatchewan. At the junction of Highways 37 and 13, it is 110 kilometres from Swift Current, 163 kilometres from the Alberta border, and 74 kilometres from the Montana border. Shaunavon was established in 1913 along the Canadian Pacific Railway line.

The town has several nicknames including Bone Creek Basin, Boomtown, and Oasis of the Prairies. The latter name is derived from the park located in the centre of town. The Shaunavon Formation, a stratigraphical unit of the Western Canadian Sedimentary Basin is named for the town.

== History ==
=== Prior to September 17, 1913 ===
Shaunavon's earliest development as a civic centre began in 1912 when the Canadian Pacific Railway (CPR) bought the land as "a divisional point on its Weyburn-Lethbridge line" going west to east. At the time there were 9 surrounding townships to the site. The CPR would build tracks through the current site of the town mainly for its bountiful water supplies. As such, prior to the railway being laid temporary shacks "sprung up around the Hipfner farm just north of the town site" of Shaunavon. as people speculated as to where the railway would go. The exact spot of where the railway would go was unknown so many pre-incorporation buildings were built on skids along Government Road.

=== Initial land sale and development ===
On the morning of September 17, 1913, 51 kilometres north in Gull Lake, the sale of lots in the new CPR town site began. The Shaunavon Standard, established 1913, published its first issue the next day. It reported that "approximately 125 people" were in attendance, and that many had been waiting for "13 days and 13 nights" for the sale to begin. In the same issue the Standard reported that "within eight hours 370 business and residential lots had been purchased".

Early buyers spent $1,000, present day costing $20,966 CND, per residential position number, with some buyers buying multiple plots. The name of the town remains a source of much debate.

From this initial purchase approximately 370 business and residential lots were bought and by November 27, 1913, Shaunavon was incorporated as a village. Following the initial purchase of land Shaunavon witnessed incredible construction, within the first few months of its history Shaunavon expanded and came to have several buildings addressing the needs of its people. These included: Brown-Naismith Hardware, the Kennedy Hotel (destroyed in 1918), Merchants Bank (now Royal Bank of Canada branch), the First Baptist Church and the Empress Hotel (renamed The Shaunavon Hotel in 1915). All but the Kennedy Hotel stills stand to this day. Also, in 1913 five grain elevators were built. 1914 also saw continued growth in the village, with several more buildings popping up.

=== World War 1 ===
Though World War I broke out in 1914, Shaunavon did not send a division until 1916. This is simply because Shaunavon, and Swift Current, did not have their own detachments until 1916. Early that year the battalion began recruiting and by April 27 the Shaunavon Standard reported that “124 officers and men” had joined and passed military inspection, while “nine more (had) signed up but have not yet passed.” Members of the 209 reported to the Swift Current barracks on September 15, 1916. Many had been on leave helping their respective families on their farms.

=== Expansion ===
By 1916 Shaunavon had grown to 897 people, keeping with its reputation as a boom town considering. Years after the war in 1922 Shaunavon appealed to the Employment Bureau to make Shaunavon a port of entry for American workers to help with harvest that year. From its inception agriculture was a major component in the Shaunavon economy but 1922 saw a shortage in helping hands.

=== Early Mineral Development ===
Later that year lignite, a form of coal, was found south of Shaunavon and was soon after mined and heavily developed. Lignite had always been present in the region and in some cases it was close enough to the surface that farmers could pick it up by hand and, for some time, had been using the lignite to heat their homes.

=== Prior to great depression ===
The late 1920s again saw a boom in development leading up to the great depression. In 1928 several new developments began in Shaunavon. In facts from April 24 to June 27, 1928 considerable funding went into the town. In subsequent years several buildings were erected. 1928 saw the completion of the King's Hotel. In 1929 the Shaunavon Service Station was built, later that year Crystal Bakery was built.

=== Oil ===
In 1938, Shaunavon became the oil distribution centre for all plants within a 30-mile radius, as decided by the B.A. Oil Company.

In 1942 the Tide Water Associated Oil Company was interested in the region of south-west Saskatchewan for the development of oil. The discovery of oil in the region was in 1952 and the initial production came from Delta field, Dollard and Eastend.

Dollard, approximately 13.4 km west of Shaunavon, was rated as one of the province's best oil wells in September 1952. In November 1952, the company announced that two more wells would be drilled in this area. With this discovery of oil, Shaunavon experienced a population boom and an increase in housing. In March 1954 Tide Water's 15th well was drilled in Dollard medium gravity oil field.

The early 1950s was a great year for the oil industry in south-western Saskatchewan. In March 1953, Saskatchewan's oil reserves were at 124,000,000 barrels, increasing from 21,000,000 from 1951.

=== Industrial Park ===
In 1981, Shaunavon began developing 65 acres of serviced land for the Shaunavon Industrial Park. The park is located on the west side of Highway No. 37. This highway connects Shaunavon to the United States and the Trans-Canada north at Gull Lake. The extremities included electrical, natural gas and water services. The first park development was Foothills Pipelines (Sask.) Ltd.

In 1983, land sold for $8,500- $9,500 an acre, marketed by SEDCO (Saskatchewan Economic Development Corporation). In 2011, empty lots were created and ranged from $20,000- $50,000, depending on size. Oil-field-based companies are the main parties interested in the industrial property. Today the industrial park is home to a wind turbine that powers the Veren Wickenheiser Centre.

=== Crescent Point Energy ===
Today, the oil industry continues to be a prominent part of Shaunavon. Shaunavon's unfolding development of oil, its history goes back to the discovery in 1952. After the initial discovery, five major and eight smaller fields were developed. A pipeline was completed in 1956, which carries the asphaltic base crude. Seismographic crews were again present in the area in the early 1980s. The construction of the Alaska Highway Gas Pipeline in 1981 from Burstall at the Alberta border reaches to Monchy at the US border. The pipeline passes 2 miles west of Shaunavon.

Wave Energy drilled the first successful horizontal well, however, a $665 million purchase in 2009, made Crescent Point the predominant company. Crescent Point Energy is an oil and gas company based out of Calgary, Alberta. In 2009, Crescent Point Energy became the main oil company to invest in Shaunavon, owning approximately 90% of the oil play.

=== Coal ===
Before the discovery of oil in 1952, Shaunavon relied on coal. Coal was dug outside Shaunavon in the hills and used to heat homes. Coal was used as barter during the Great Depression. In 1932, the promise of Shaunavon Coal Company's mine was rising. The Roe's Coal Mine sold tunnel coal for $1.75 a ton and open mine coal for $1.50 a ton. In November 1942, the town feared a shortage of coal and in October 1945 there was a shortage of miners and high demand for coal. Unfortunately, coal labour was cheap and miners were paid low wages.

Today, Shaunavon is one of the five operating coal mines in the entire province and ts in one of the three coal fields in Saskatchewan that contain almost five billion tonnes of Lignite resources. This means it is able to supply the province with thermal electric power for 300 years with the current rate of consumption.

=== World War I/ World War II/ Korean War ===
In 1939, 83 men of the 14th Canadian Light Horse left for Dundurn approximately 391 km north-east of Shaunavon. In May 1940, 65 men applied for active war service. In total, from the town and area there were 600 men enlisted in World War I. In October 1940 Shaunavon local, Dennis King with the C.A.S.F. England captured a German pilot after his plane was shot down.

War efforts from Shaunavon were not just seen in battle because in the town war service drives began. June 1940, the Legion Ladies Auxiliary sent cigarette and blankets as gifts to local soldiers overseas and in 1943, the Shaunavon Services Committee sent parcels to 85 soldiers. Importantly, the Shaunavon Plaza Theatre gave a benefit performance to help boost the sale of War Saving Certificates and Stamps in July 1940.

The town was able to financially contribute to the Second World War. This included $6,580 in 1941, $3,750 in 1942, and $10,000 in 1943–1945.

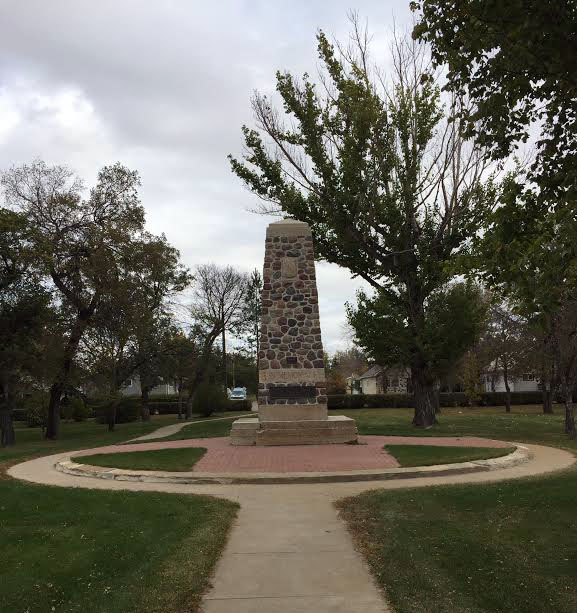
Cenotaph at Memorial Park

Today, Shaunavon's local cenotaph still stands in Memorial Park, to commemorate the fallen soldiers of the World Wars. The cenotaph was built in 1925 and unveiled after completion in November 1926. It was built to commemorate those who fought in the First World War and a sealed list of men from the Shaunavon district is enclosed in the cenotaph. After the Second World War, the cenotaph then held a plaque of all those who were killed.

=== Water ===
In 1913, settlers came to the area that would later be known as Shaunavon. Under a deal by the government at the time, land could be purchased throughout the province for as little as $10 a quarter section after building a homestead on the quarter. Within eight hours, 370 lots totalling $210,000 were purchased! While this brought settlers to the province, Shaunavon had an attraction that drew them to this region: water.

Water was essential for settlers and the water in the area was considered to be the purest and most plentiful. Within the course of one year, Shaunavon went from being a town of empty lots to a "Booming town" with a population of over 700 people. As a result, the town gained the nickname “Boomtown.” Shaunavon became the first community in Canada to grow from a village to a town in under one year.

In 1914, the Canadian Pacific Railway brought the railway through the community for the purpose of having access to the water supply for their locomotives. It was another positive sign for the community.

It was a big deal in 1939 when the royal family visited Shaunavon. The Royal Train, with King George VI and Queen Elizabeth on board, stopped in the town and asked to be supplied with spring water. The infamous, "Oasis of the Prairies" water was given to the royal family and nicknamed the Royal Water. The town gained the title "the water capital of Canada."

=== The Skating Rink ===
Another important milestone in the community in the 1960s was the building of the public arena. With very little to do in the winter months, hockey was always a very important part of the community and an indoor facility was greatly needed. The centre included facilities for skating with artificial ice placed over the dirt ground. Later the extension for the curling rink was added to the existing facility and cement was added to the skating rink.

Rising insurance costs prompted the formation of Project 2002 — a plan to replace the rink with a more modern facility over the foundation of the old arena. With the new arena conforming to new building codes the price of insurance for the facility would be more affordable. Fundraisers such as the Canadian national women's hockey team visiting the Shaunavon Badgers and Hockey Day in Canada helped to raise funds for the new arena. Originally slated at $2 million, the price for the arena has grown to $6 million.

=== Railway ===
==== Great Western Railway ====
The Great Western Railway (GWR) is a shortline railway company located in south-west Saskatchewan, operating on former Canadian Pacific Railway tracks. After the 1983 removal of the Crow Rate, a railway subsidy that benefitted farmers, farmers were forced to pay to ship their grain through larger mainline terminals.

Adding to this, by favouring establishing grain terminals on their mainlines, the Canadian Pacific Railway and the Canadian National Railway deprived their thousands of miles of track across the Canadian prairies. Railway companies were forced to abandon some lines in Saskatchewan. These two developments decreased the number of cars moving via railway and forced the Canadian Pacific Railway to abandon the Southwest Saskatchewan Railway portion of Great Western Railway.

In January 2000, the Canadian Pacific Rail contacted a company from Abbotsford, British Columbia, Westcan Rail, to sell 550 km (330 miles) of track in south-west Saskatchewan. Then in May, Westcan Rail began negotiations with CP Rail to purchase the four branch lines. By June, there was an agreement and four subdivisions were formed. The line subdivisions include:

- The Notukeu Subdivision, between Consul and Val Marie (100 miles);
- The Altawan Subdivision, from Shaunavon and Consul (63 miles);
- The Shaunavon Subdivision, from Limerick and Shaunavon (106 miles);
- The Vanguard Subdivision, between Meyronne and Wymark (76 miles).

The Great Western Railway was at the time, a fully owned Saskatchewan subsidiary of Westcan and its headquarters are located in Shaunavon, Saskatchewan. Finally on September 13, 2000, Westcan Rail received provincial government approval to purchase the lines.

In 2004, Westcan Rail wanted to sell the shortline. In the fall of 2004, a group of local farmers and municipal governments formed a company and purchased the branch lines to keep the GWR running. The private investors raised almost $4 million toward the $5.5-million purchase, and the remaining $1.7 million was supplied by a provincial loan. Today it is still locally owned and operated.

The GWR moves 6,400 cars annually. The initial goal in 2000, was 4,000 cars per year, which is the same as 30,000 fully loaded axle trucks off the roads. It is the longest shortline in Saskatchewan. Grain, fertilizer, corn, crude oil and recycled rubber are the main resources transported, as well as running a prosperous storage car business. The GWR also owns 23 original grain elevators, and of these, the company still uses 16.

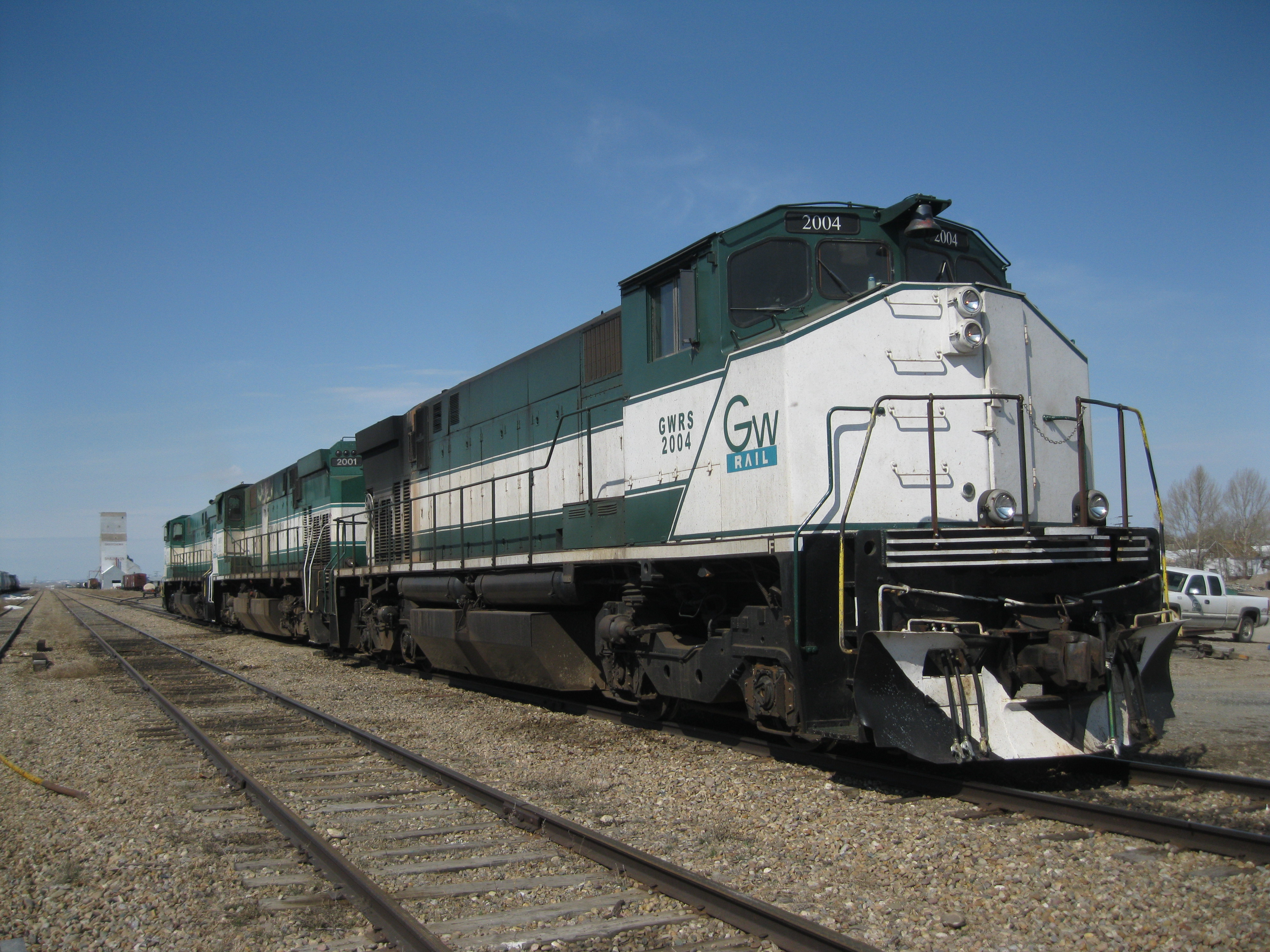
A trio of GWRS M420s idling outside of the Shaunavon shops

The removal of the Crow Rate, which covered the cost of shipping grain, left farmers having to pay to ship their grains to world markets. It became more economical for grain producers to ship to large terminals along the main line. This brought about the closure and demolition of many wooden grain elevators along the line to Shaunavon. In the late 1990s, the CPR announced its intentions to sell the track leading to the south-west to WestCan Rail, a railway salvage operation. Action was swift. Grain Producers formed a coalition to lobby WestCan Rail. A deal was made that formed the Great Western Railway to run the line as a shortline with the eventual plans to purchase the railway back from WestCan Rail. Meanwhile, producers purchased the remaining standing wooden grain elevators in Shaunavon, Admiral, Eastend, Ponteix and Neville.

Today the Great Western Railway is owned by the coalition and continues to operate the shortline to south-west Saskatchewan. The Great Western Railway headquarters are located in Shaunavon.

=== Name origin ===
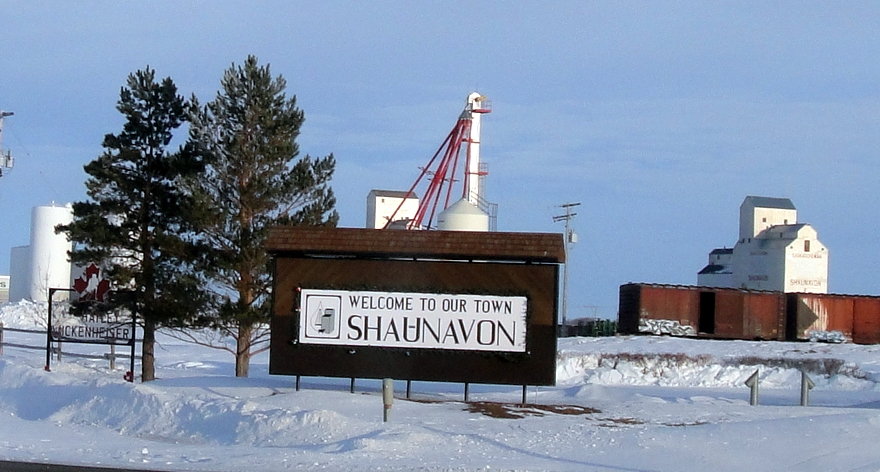
Welcome sign

The name Shaunavon is believed to be a combination of the names of Lord Shaughnessy and William Cornelius Van Horne, two of the four founders of the Canadian Pacific Railway, although there is inconclusive evidence that suggests otherwise. The most damaging of this evidence is from Mr. F.G. Horsey, the CPR townsite representative in 1913, who said "he was personally in the Calgary office when a wire came through from Lord Shaughnessy declining the honour of having the town named after him, but suggesting that they name it Shaunavon after an area about his home in the old country . . .". However, Shaughnessy was of Irish descent, but was born to dirt poor parents in Milwaukee, Wisconsin. Thus, the existence of any kind of an old country estate is highly unlikely, and no such place shows up in Irish place name references. Since CP's files are silent on the subject, the derivation of the town name Shaunavon is likely to remain a mystery.

== Political history ==
=== Federal politics ===
Since Shaunavon was founded in 1913, the town and surrounding area have been represented by several different political parties and leaders. The town became a part of the new Maple Creek electoral district, established in 1914. In the 1917 federal election, Unionist party member and Saskatchewan Grain Growers' Association organizer John Archibald Maharg ran unopposed, becoming the first Member of Parliament for the area.

The next election in 1921 saw Progressive candidate and Gull Lake resident Neil Haman McTaggart win the district, and Liberal George Spence won in 1925. Spence would resign the next year, replaced with fellow Liberal William George Bock.

Shaunavon had its first major political triumph in the 1930 election, when Shaunavon resident Dr. James Beck Swanston beat Bock and won the seat for the Conservatives. Swanston had run previously with the Conservatives, coming second in the two previous federal elections. In addition to defeating Bock, Swanston also defeated another Shaunavon native: the Farmer Party candidate, Annie Hollis. One of Canada's earliest female politicians, Hollis was the president of the Saskatchewan Grain Growers' Association; the same organization John Archibald Maharg ran when he was elected. She later became the leader of the United Farmers of Canada.

Swanston's time in federal office ended in 1935, when Liberal candidate Charles Evans won the election. Swanston finished third in a race that was closely fought between four candidates. From 1935 until the ridings' redistribution in 1952, the Maple Creek riding was in the hands of left-wing parties. The Liberals held the seat the entire time, except from 1945 to 1949, when Co-operative Commonwealth Federation candidate Duncan John McCuaig won.

After 1953, Shaunavon became a part of the Swift Current—Maple Creek federal riding. The previous trend of voting for left-wing candidates changed in 1958, with the election of Jack McIntosh, who ran as a Progressive Conservative. McIntosh would represent the region until 1972, when fellow Progressive Conservative Frank Fletcher Hamilton was elected. Between 1958 and 1984, the Swift Current–Maple Creek seat in the House of Commons was property of the Progressive Conservatives.

Swift Current–Maple Creek constituency combined with the Assiniboia constituency in 1987. Not long after, in 1993, Lee Morrison, a Reform candidate, broke the Progressive Conservatives' hold on the riding. Morrison was elected again in 1997, when Shaunavon was represented by the newly formed Cypress Hills-Grasslands riding. The Canadian Alliance party and candidate David Anderson won handily in the 2000 federal election. Anderson, who became a part of the Conservatives in 2004, represented Shaunavon federally until 2019, when he stepped down. The current MP is his nephew, Jeremy Patzer.

Since Dr. Swanston's loss in 1935, the Member of Parliament representing Shaunavon has never been a native of the town: Figures like Morrison and Anderson, while representing the town federally, have come from other towns nearby (Morrison and Anderson come from Vidora and Frontier, respectively.)

=== Provincial politics ===
Provincially, Shaunavon was part of the Gull Lake constituency from the town's beginning in 1913 to 1917. They were led by Liberal party member Daniel Cameron Lochead. In 1917, Shaunavon became part of Saskatchewan's Cypress constituency, and elected Liberal leaders in three straight elections. Henry Halvorson won two of those elections, including the 1921 provincial election, in which he ran unopposed.

Shaunavon had its own electoral district between 1934 and 1938, and elected Farmer-Labour candidate Clarence Stork. The Shaunavon district was abolished in 1938, and Shaunavon was made a part of the nearby Gull Lake constituency. The first leader of the new Gull Lake district was Liberal Harvey Harold McMahon, and he was replaced by CCF candidate Al Murray after the 1944 provincial election. The CCF would control the district until it was rezoned and renamed in 1952.

Before 1952's provincial election, Shaunavon became the main headquarters for the Gull Lake constituency. The district was renamed after Shaunavon. In the new Shaunavon district, left-wing parties continued to rise, with the Liberals, CCF and, later, the New Democrats trading power over the area. In the Provincial Election of 1975, Eiliv (Sonny) Anderson(businessman and farmer) of Robsart, Saskatchewan was elected,(as a Liberal) to represent the Shaunavon Constituency in the Provincial Legislature. Later Mr.Anderson went on to be Special Assistant to the Federal Minister of Agriculture, Mr. Eugene Whelan. In 1982 Mr. Anderson was appointed as Chairman of Farm Credit Corporation by Prime Minister Pierre Trudeau. In 1978, Shaunavon native Dwain Lingenfelter was elected to represent the area in the Legislative Assembly of Saskatchewan. Lingenfelter would go on to have a long political career, later seeing him become the head of Saskatchewan's NDP and a key member of Premier Roy Romanow's provincial cabinet.

1986's provincial election saw the streak of left-wing parties snapped by the Progressive Conservatives' Ted Gleim. The NDP won the seat back in 1991, as another Shaunavon local, Glen McPherson, was elected.

In 1995, Shaunavon district was dissolved and redistributed into Wood River constituency and Cypress Hills constituency. McPherson, then the sitting MLA, changed parties from the NDP to the Liberals, and ran in Wood River. He won two elections in Wood River, and tied Saskatchewan Party opponent Yogi Huyghebaert in 1999. After a returning officer cast a deciding vote in favour of McPherson to break the tie, the result was thrown out and a by-election was called. McPherson chose not to run, and Huyghebaert was elected to legislative assembly.

Shaunavon has been a part of the Cypress Hills constituency since 1995. The left-wing slant of the area, like most of Saskatchewan's provincial politics, has seen a shift to the right. The election of the PCs' Jack Goohsen in 1995 marked a new political beginning for the region. Goohsen resigned his seat in 1999 after being found guilty of soliciting sex from an underage prostitute.

Wayne Elhard won the Cypress Hills Constituency for the Saskatchewan Party in 1999, and served until his retirement in 2016. The constituency is currently represented by Saskatchewan Party MLA Doug Steele.

== Agriculture ==
=== Early Agriculture ===
Shaunavon is largely an agricultural community. Before settlement in 1913, Shaunavon was entirely open land. After settlement, the community largely subsisted on agriculture and ranching, including growing wheat that won top wards at international agriculture shows.

The 1920s and 1930s met with unprecedented economic boom. In 1921, Rancher Harry Otterson constructed the community's first dipping vat. At the time, his land included 20,000 acres and 350 head of cattle. In 1927, Otterson shipped a stock of cattle to Chicago for $16.65 per 100 lbs, which was the highest price for cattle post war up until that point. Other animals bred in Shaunavon at the time included horses, pigs, and turkeys.

From 1938 until 1969, the predominant crops where spring wheat, oats, barley, fall rye, and flax. Like much of the rest of the Saskatchewan, the 1940s experienced difficult farming conditions. In June 1940, Shaunavon experienced an increasing number of grasshopper infestations that negatively affected crops.

The 1940s also experienced several natural disasters. The winter of 1940 had record breaking snowfall. The snowfall disrupted several services, including road clearing and mail. During the winter, Rancher Dan Gunn spent several days travelling 10 miles to his neighbour's farm in an unsuccessful trip to get some horse feed.

In 1942, Shaunavon experienced two large prairie fires that destroyed thousands of acres of crops. The fires were believed to have been caused by sparks from machinery, with one spark originating in the Waldville district. The damage spread far enough to cause concern for citizens in Montana on the other side of the border.

The 1940s also saw an incredible decline in crop yields, likely resulting from the conditions described above. In 1949, crop yields were at an all-time low. Spring wheat, barley, and fall rye produced a mere one bushel per acre. Oats proved completely impossible to grow, being recorded as producing zero bushels per acre.

=== Agriculture in the 1950s ===
In 1950, cattle were still raised and continued to be exported to the United States. Joe White and Angus Willett where among those exporting, having exported 78 head of cattle to Low Moor, Iowa. This time also saw a sharp turn upwards for agriculture. In 1948, residents of Shaunavon first began experimenting with fertilizer. The first farmer to use fertilizer was Anton Dynneson. By 1950, the benefits for fertilizer had become evident, with Dynneson reporting better yields than years without fertilizer. This year also marked a great emphasis on exporting crops, with Shaunavon containing a total of eight grain elevators.

Agriculture and ranching continued to make their mark on the land and become a significant part of Shaunavon's culture. In 1953, a lake north-east of Lake Athabasca was named Lake Maguire, in honour of Rancher Hugo Maguire.

=== Modern agriculture ===
The tail end of the 20th century marked a continual increase in crops. In 1970 durum wheat was first introduced. Canola was also introduced in this year, but was not replanted until the 1990s. This trend continued. In 1993, several new crops were introduced, including mustard, sunflowers, and peas. 1993 was also noted for its large crop yields. This was especially true for oats, which peaked at 91.9 bushels per acre. This was a stark contrast to the zero bushels per acre in 1949. Despite a slight dip in 2000, the crop yields have remained stable ever since. As with many agricultural communities, several businesses have also sprung up in order to support the farms and ranches.

== Climate ==
Climate data for Shaunavon (1981–2010)
Month	Jan	Feb	Mar	Apr	May	Jun	Jul	Aug	Sep	Oct	Nov	Dec	Year
Record high °C (°F)	14.5 (58.1)	19 (66)	21.1 (70.0)	31 (88)	36 (97)	39 (102)	37.5 (99.5)	38.5 (101.3)	35.5 (95.9)	29 (84)	21.5 (70.7)	16 (61)	39 (102)
Mean daily maximum °C (°F)	−4.4 (24.1)	−1.2 (29.8)	3.3 (37.9)	12.4 (54.3)	18.3 (64.9)	22.1 (71.8)	26.2 (79.2)	26.3 (79.3)	19.0 (66.2)	11.8 (53.2)	1.9 (35.4)	−3.5 (25.7)	11.0 (51.8)
Daily mean °C (°F)	−9.7 (14.5)	−6.4 (20.5)	−2.3 (27.9)	5.4 (41.7)	11.2 (52.2)	15.4 (59.7)	18.6 (65.5)	18.3 (64.9)	11.8 (53.2)	5.4 (41.7)	−3.1 (26.4)	−8.7 (16.3)	4.7 (40.5)
Mean daily minimum °C (°F)	−14.9 (5.2)	−11.5 (11.3)	−7.8 (18.0)	−1.5 (29.3)	4.0 (39.2)	8.7 (47.7)	10.9 (51.6)	10.2 (50.4)	4.7 (40.5)	−1.1 (30.0)	−8.1 (17.4)	−13.9 (7.0)	−1.7 (28.9)
Record low °C (°F)	−37.5 (−35.5)	−38 (−36)	−31.5 (−24.7)	−20.5 (−4.9)	−8.5 (16.7)	−3 (27)	2.5 (36.5)	−2.2 (28.0)	−9.5 (14.9)	−25 (−13)	−37 (−35)	−42.2 (−44.0)	−42.2 (−44.0)
Average precipitation mm (inches)	19.9 (0.78)	12.4 (0.49)	24.8 (0.98)	23.0 (0.91)	57.6 (2.27)	73.7 (2.90)	53.6 (2.11)	38.6 (1.52)	34.2 (1.35)	21.3 (0.84)	16.8 (0.66)	19.3 (0.76)	395.1 (15.56)
Source: Environment Canada

== Demographics ==
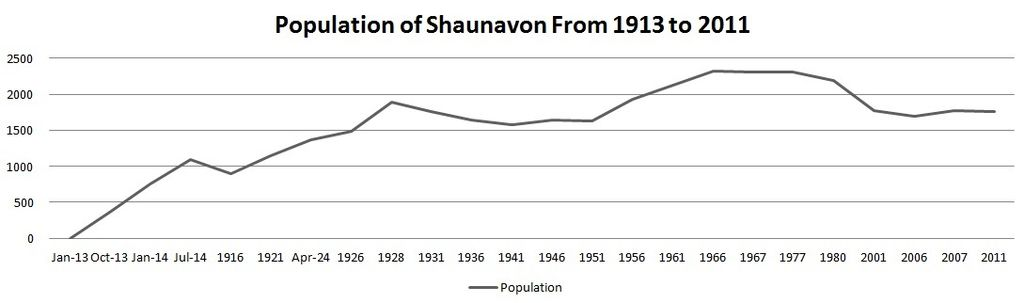
Shaunavon population from 1913 to present

In the 2021 Census of Population conducted by Statistics Canada, Shaunavon had a population of 1,784 living in 799 of its 929 total private dwellings, a change of 4.1% from its 2016 population of 1,714. With a land area of 4.8 km^{2} (1.9 sq mi), it had a population density of 371.7/km^{2} (962.6/sq mi) in 2021.

In 2006, Shaunavon consisted of 930 females and 825 males, with 83.4 per cent of the population over 15 years of age, and 46.8 years of age being the average age of the town's residents. Ninety-four per cent of Shaunavon's residents identify English as their mother tongue, with the remaining six per cent identifying French, Cantonese, Dutch, Finnish, German, Ilocano, Korean, Mandarin, or Norwegian as their mother tongue. The average household size in Shaunavon is 2.1 people, with the median household income at $38,759, and the unemployment rate at 2.9 per cent.

Population history

The town of Shaunavon rapidly grew in population during its first year. In January 1913, the area that would become Shaunavon had a population of zero; by January of the following year, 750 people resided in the town. The area surrounding Shaunavon consisted mostly of Anglo Saxon, Scandinavian, French Canadian, and Finnish homesteads. The pioneers of Shaunavon were much the same, emigrating from all parts of Europe and the United States. In 1916, Shaunavon experienced a minor drop in population, before experiencing a steady growth in residence over the following 12 years.

With the arrival of the Great Depression, the boomtown's population decreased, from 1,896 residents in 1928, to a low of 1,571 residents in 1941.

Over the next 25 years, the population of Shaunavon increased steadily to an all-time high of 2,318 residents. This was due to the discovery of oil in the region, which brought prosperity to the area. From 1966 to 1977, the population hovered around the 2,300 mark.

Year	Population
January 1913	0
October 1913	367
January 1914	750
July 1914	1,100
1916	897
1921	1,146
April 1924	1,366
1926	1,491
1928	1,896
1931	1,761
1936	1,636
1941	1,571
1946	1,643
1951	1,625
1956	1,930
1961	2,128
1966	2,318
1967	2,309
1977	2,315
2001	1,775
2006	1,691
2007	1,775
2011	1,756
2016	1,714
2021	1,784

Canada census – Shaunavon, Saskatchewan community profile

	2011
Population	1,756 (3.8% from 2006)
Land area	5.10 km^{2} (1.97 sq mi)
Population density	344.2/km^{2} (891/sq mi)
Median age	46.8 (M: 45.2, F: 47.9)
Private dwellings	877 (total)
Median household income

References: 2011

== Arts and culture ==
The Grand Coteau Heritage Centre is a museum and chapter library with a local art gallery and heritage exhibits on display. It was first formed in August 1931 by members of the Shaunavon Canadian Club. Derivation of the name of Shaunavon's Museum "Grand Coteau" comes from the title le grand coteau or grand slope, of the Missouri as applied by the explorer La Verendrye.

The Grand Coteau has received numerous donations over the years. The museum only displays a small fraction of the estimated 11,000 artifacts collected. The museum houses a heritage room in the basement, an art gallery, and a taxidermy wildlife exhibit. For a number of years after World War II, the museum was severely short staffed. Frank O. Bransted, a Shaunavon resident, was the sole volunteer at the Grand Coteau. In 1957, the Grand Coteau was bought by the Town of Shaunavon from the school board for the sum of $1.00. It was then moved to its current location on Shaunavon's Centre Street.

The Plaza Theatre on main street runs both movies and theatrical shows.

The Darkhorse Theatre performs two major productions a year, and is well known for producing quality shows. The Darkhorse Theatre uses top of the line production equipment to complement the set design, wardrobe, and makeup for the major productions. The spring production consists of three pub night performances and the fall production offers six nights of dinner theatre.

== Attractions ==
=== Tourism ===
Tourists will find several attractions in Shaunavon and some in the area. Shaunavon's tourist attractions include the Darkhorse Theatre, the Grand Coteau Heritage & Cultural Centre, the Plaza Theatre, Rock Creek Golf Course, and the Crescent Point Wickenheiser Centre. A skateboarding area complete with rails, ramps, and several quarter pipes can be found in Jubilee Park. Multiple baseball diamonds sit on the grounds of the Crescent Point Wickenheiser Centre. A swimming pool opens and cools off locals during the summer months. Two tennis courts are available to the public.

Annual events such as the Boomtown Days Rodeo are held every July. The first rodeo was held in 1914, one year after the town was founded. The inaugural Boomtown Days Rodeo was held on July 1, 1914. The Shaunavon & District Music Festival is an annual event held in February or early March. The first Shaunavon & District Music Festival was held on April 15, 1928.

=== Shaunavon and District Music Festival ===
First started in 1928, the festival has been a staple in Shaunavon for 83 years. The inaugural festival took place on April 15, 1928. When it was first started, the Saskatchewan Music Festival Association was then known as the Southwestern Branch of the Saskatchewan Musical Association. There was years where the festival did not take place due to World War II. The festival is organized by the Saskatchewan Arts Council and Saskatchewan Music Festival Association. The festival also provides scholarships for music education students. There were nearly $3,500 in scholarships handed out at the 2014 festival. The festival annually chooses an honorary patron of the festival. The chosen patron is routinely a well-known citizen of Shaunavon. Occasionally a citizen of the neighbouring towns of Eastend, Gull Lake, or Maple Creek will be chosen as the honorary patron.

=== Other attractions ===
Showarama occurs in the spring showcasing merchants in and around the community, I love Shaunavon Day, and the Parade of Lights take place each winter, and Boomtown Days and the Pro-Rodeo occur during the summer. The Shaunavon Rodeo Grounds serve as the backdrop for the annual Shaunavon Pro Rodeo. The Shaunavon Rodeo Association has hosted events, both amateur and professional, for over 40 years. The Shaunavon Pro Rodeo is a CPRA sanctioned event and features many professional competitors that follow the rodeo circuit east from the Calgary Stampede. The Rodeo Grounds are located about 6 km west of Shaunavon on Highway No. 13.

== Sports ==
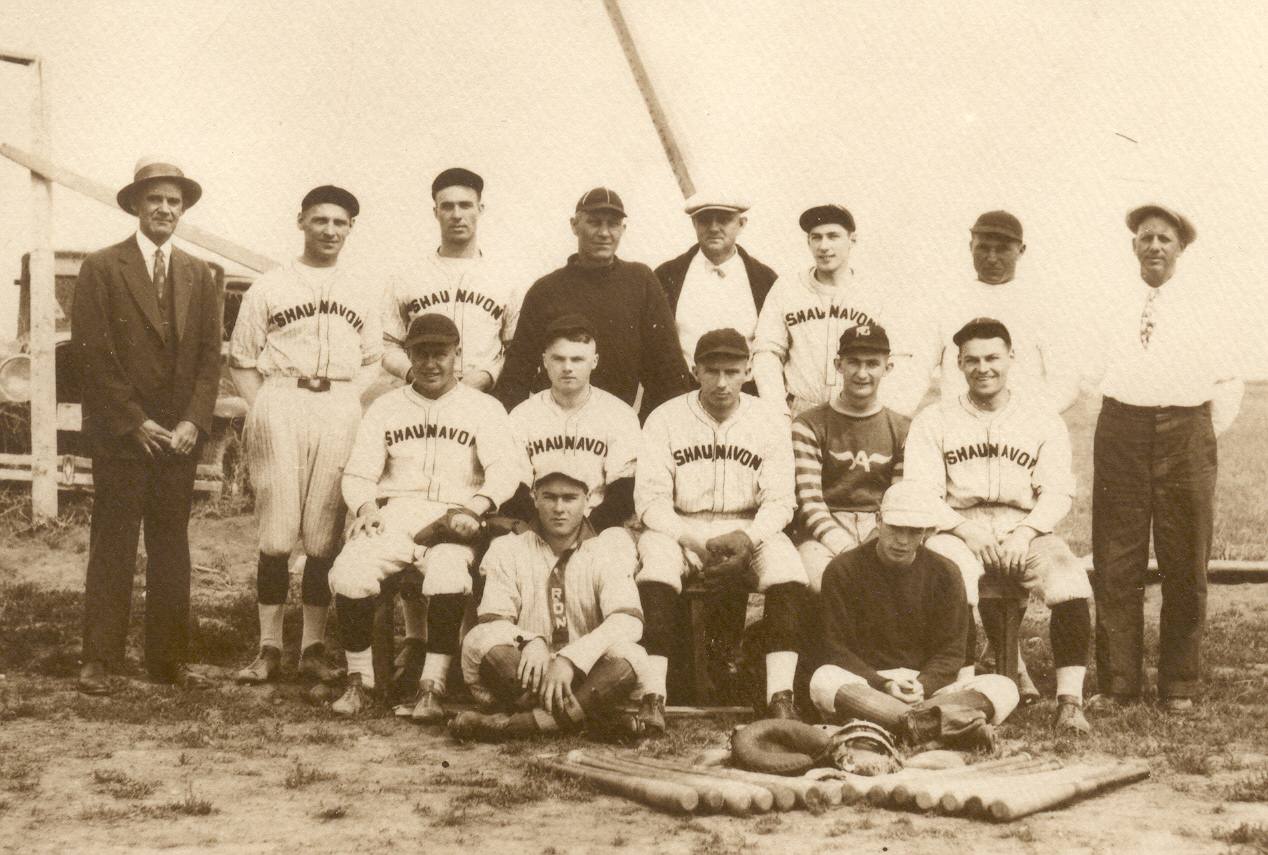
Shaunavon baseball team in the 1930s

Shaunavon has many seasonal and year-round venues that help to boost tourism and entertain residents. It also has numerous organizations offering sport, culture, recreational, and social opportunities including hockey, soccer, curling, figure skating, karate, fastball and baseball, volleyball, basketball, performing arts, and a variety of dance disciplines.

The service groups include: Shaunavon Kinsmen & Kinettes, Shaunavon Legion & Legion Auxiliary, Shaunavon Elks & Royal Purple, Shawnees, Knights of Columbus, Hometown Club, Senior Citizens, and a number of church organizations.

Recreational facilities include: walking trails, Recreation Complex, tennis courts, horseshoe pits, swimming pool, regional library, playgrounds, fitness gym, golf club, rinks, movie theatre, ball park, skating, and curling.

During the summer months, the skating rink serves as a community centre for various events and in the fall and winter is covered with ice again for both skating and curling.

In the summer months an outdoor recreation swimming pool is available and a 9-hole golf course, Rock Creek, is also open. Camping is available at the Shawnee Campground adjacent to Memorial Park in the heart of the town.

Shaunavon is home to the Shaunavon Badgers of the Whitemud Hockey League.

Shaunavon hosted CBC's Fifth Annual Hockey Day in Canada on February 21, 2004.

== Transportation ==
Saskatchewan Highways 13 and 37 connect to Shaunavon.

Shaunavon is served by the Shaunavon Airport. Shaunavon's airport has a regulation asphalt, lighted runway, 3,000 feet (910 m) in length. The airport has LWIS weather system as well as a global positioning system to assist pilots to their destinations.

== Services ==
=== Government services ===
Shaunavon is the main large centre next to Swift Current in south-western Saskatchewan meaning that the town has a lot of government services.
The town houses a local Royal Canadian Mounted Police (RCMP) detachment. Also in Shaunavon is a Service Canada facility, the Shaunavon Scheduled Outreach Site. It helps residents with services such as pension information, labour standards, disability benefits, veterans affairs, job search assistance, amongst other services.
Shaunavon Hospital and Care Centre is part of the Cypress Health Region. The hospital offers primary health care services with physicians and nurse practitioners. The Shaunavon Branch of Regional Library is located at the Grand Coteau Heritage and Cultural Centre.
Shaunavon is home to three different schools, two elementary schools and one high school. Under the Chinook School Division is Shaunavon Public School, which is the town's public elementary school, and Shaunavon High School, which is the town's only high school. Shaunavon also has one of the few rural Catholic schools in Saskatchewan, Christ the King School, an elementary school.

=== Businesses ===
Shaunavon is home to a variety of stores, ranging from grocery to clothing stores. The Shaunavon Co-op has been part of the town since 1935 and it offers such services such as a food store, home and agro centre, gas bar and cardlock. The town also has a variety of other small businesses, including restaurants, pharmacies, a liquor store, banks, hotels, car dealerships, a florist, and a discount store.

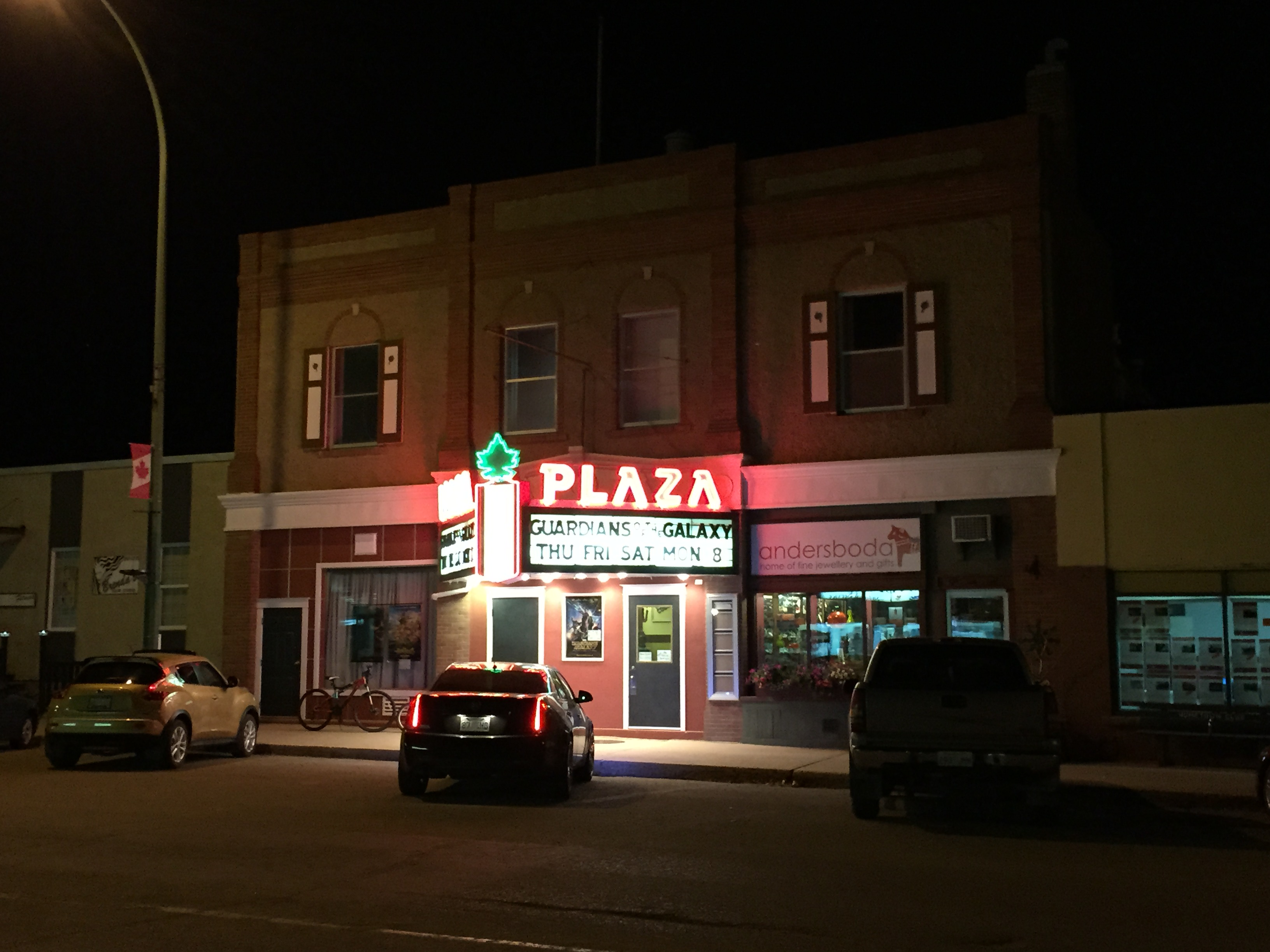
The Shaunavon Plaza Theatre is shown all lit up for an evening showing at its location on Centre Street in Shaunavon

== Education ==
The schools in Shaunavon are part of the Chinook School Division.

- Shaunavon High School (grades 8 – 12)
- Shaunavon Public School (grades K – 7)
- Christ the King School (grades K – 7)
- Cypress Hills College

== Media ==
Shaunavon has one radio station Country 1490, formerly CJSN 1490 and the local newspaper The Shaunavon Standard.

== Notable residents ==
- Jim Hunter (skier)
- Hayley Wickenheiser
- Frances Hyland
- Dwain Lingenfelter
- Ann Eriksson
- Hunter Brothers
- Braydon Coburn

== Mayors and reeves ==
=== Mayors ===
The Shaunavon Standard documented many accomplishments by town council, highlighted by the purchasing of fire equipment in the early years, the construction and maintenance of roads and sidewalks, and the focus on emergencies services and recreational initiatives throughout their history.

Era	Mayor	Terms	History
1913–1929	R. Roycroft, Overseer	1913–14	Shaunavon held its first council meeting December 22, 1913. Robert Roycroft was the overseer. Percy Woods and James McConbrey were also voted in. In 1914, Shaunavon had a population of 1,100, which elevated them status of a town.
	George Barr	1915	Geo. Barr was elected first mayor in 1915.
	T.J.E. Campbell	1916, 1923–26	In May 1916, T.J.E. Campbell was elected mayor of Shaunavon by acclamation. In December, Campbell resigned after enlisting in the 209th Battalion. In response, H. Brown and George Jackson were elected by acclamation. T.J.E. Campbell survived his time at war and died in February 1952. A valued citizen, Campbell was remembered for his betterment of the town. Campbell served six terms as mayor: 1916, 1923 to 1926, and into 1930.
	A. A. Hassard	1917	A.A. Hassard was mayor of Shaunavon, 1917. In December, J.E. Mitchell and P.L. Naismith were nominated for head set.
	P.L. Naismith	1918	Naismith defeated Mitchell to become mayor in 1918.
	J.E. Mitchell	1919–22, 1927–29	J.E. Mitchell served four straight terms as mayor, each time being elected by acclamation. In October 1922, Mitchell announced he would not run the following year. This led to concern over lack of candidates for the civic election in December. George Barr and T.J.E. Campbell were the two candidates running for the office of mayor, with Campbell winning to serve two more consecutive terms. Mitchell was back as mayor in 1927 to 1929, and presided during the opening of Shaunavon's new Court House.
1930–1959	T.J.E. Campbell	1930	T.J.E. Campbell survived his time at war and died in February 1952. A valued citizen, Campbell was remembered for his betterment of the town. Campbell served six terms as mayor: 1916, 1923 to 1926, and into 1930.
	C. Jensen	1931–34, 1952–58	Chris Jensen was acclaimed for the mayor's chair in February 1930, after Campbell resigned. A town council meeting in February 1932 was postponed so councillors could watch the Swift Current versus Shaunavon hockey game. In October 1952, Jensen was once again elected by acclamation for mayor's chair, and continued for seven more terms. Shaunavon's population was listed as just over 2,200 people. Jensen resigned after 17 years of civic service. He served for five years as councillor and 12 as mayor. In May, Syd Stevens defeated Max Houston for mayor's chair.
	Jas Cardno	1935–39, 1941–43	In November 1934, Jas Cardno became new mayor by acclamation. In 1936, Cardno defeated Chris Jensen for the chair, won mayor's chair over Robert McIntyre (by a substantial majority), in 1938. But in 1940, Cardno was once again elected to mayor by acclamation. Cardno announced the town's finances were in trouble, in 1935. In 1941, Shaunavon had a population over 1,500. The town paid councillors $2.50 per meeting and mayor $4.00. In June 1943, Cardno resigned from his position after seven years of mayoral service. And in July, R.L. Fisher was elected by acclamation.
	J.C. Hossie	1940	December 1940, Mayor J.C. Hossie declared Boxing Day a civic holiday.
	R.L. Fisher – part, W. Killburn – balance	1944	In May 1944, Mayor Robert Lewis Fisher died at the age of 54. W. Killburn balanced out the duties.
	Neil McLean	1945–46, 1949–51	In November 1945, Neil McLean was elected as mayor by acclamation, and served for five terms throughout his career.
	G.L. Humphries	1947–48	Town Council, under the direction of G.L. Humphreys in 1948, moved to establish an airfield owned by the municipality.
	Syd Stevens	1959	After a town council meeting in June 1959, Shaunavon adopted Daylight Saving Time.
1960–present	Syd Stevens	1960–61	
	Albert Leia	1962–63	In November 1962, Albert Leia was elected mayor, defeating Norman Ross.
	David Hanna	1964–65	In 1964, David Hanna defeated incumbent Leia for mayor's chair. Hanna was the youngest mayor to serve Shaunavon.
	Robert Nelson	1966–79	In November 1966, G.E. Boyd was elected mayor but resigned in March 1967. Bob Nelson and Syd Stevens ran as candidates and the following year, Nelson defeated Stevens by 79 votes for mayor's chair. Nelson was re-elected in October 1978, for what would turn out to be his final term. He defeated Bruce Pearson, 495 votes to 350 votes. Nelson served a total 14 consecutive years.
	Bruce Pearson	1980–87	Bruce Pearson defeated long-time incumbent, Robert Nelson, for mayor's chair in 1980 and again in 1982. In August 1986, town council stated they could not pay the bills for the town's old train station. Smoking was banned from town council meetings in January 1987. In September 1988, Pearson stepped down from municipal politics after serving 15 years. Pearson was alderman for seven years and mayor for eight.
	Norm Lavoy	1988–94	Norm Lavoy was selected as the new mayor in October 1988. In August 1994, Lavoy stepped down after six years in the head chair. He had also served six years prior as an alderman.
	Gordon Speirs	1994–96	Gordon Speirs was elected as mayor by acclamation in October 1994. He previously served eight years on council. Speirs also served as Fire Chief for over 40 years and remained involved in the community his whole life.
	Ron Froshaug	1997–99	In 1997, former alderman Ron Froshaug became mayor.
	Sharon Dickie	2000–2016	In October 2000, Sharon Dickie was elected mayor. Dickie made history by being the first female mayor. A month-long strike by the town's employees ended in August 2006, after a contract was reached with the town of Shaunavon. In 2009, Dickie returned for her fourth consecutive term as mayor. She defeated Pete Allen 380 votes to 226 votes. In September 2012, urban municipalities' term of office increased from three to four years. In 2016, Dickie stepped down as mayor.
	Grant Greenslade	2016–2020	In October 2016, Grant Greenslade was elected mayor. As mayor, Greenslade started a committee of local municipal governments in Southwest Saskatchewan that meets twice a year. Greenslade did not run for reelection in 2020.
	Kyle Bennett	2020–2024	In November 2020, Kyle Bennett became mayor by acclamation. He had served as alderman for three terms prior. Bennett stepped down as mayor in August 2024 in light of a Code of Ethics Bylaw investigation.
	Cal Vance	2024–Present	Cal Vance was elected mayor in November 2024, defeating Drew Grainger by 66 votes.

=== Reeves ===
Shaunavon resides in the rural municipality of Grassy Creek (No. 78). In 1913, the first reeve was L.T. Bergh. In 1956, they introduced two-year terms and in 2012, four-year terms. Michael Sutter currently sits as reeve.

== See also ==
- List of communities in Saskatchewan
- List of towns in Saskatchewan
