= H. H. Kemper =

Canadian politician

Herman Henry Kemper

MLA for Gull Lake
- In office 1934–1938
- Preceded by: Daniel Lochead
- Succeeded by: Harvey McMahon

Personal details
- Born: July 7, 1882 Hebron, Nebraska
- Died: August 1964 (aged 82) Tompkins, Saskatchewan
- Party: Farmer-Labour Group (1932–1935)
- Other political affiliations: Co-operative Commonwealth Federation (1935–1964)
- Spouse: Mina Burwell (m. 1911)
- Occupation: Farmer, agrarian activist

Herman Henry Kemper (1882-1964) was an American-born farmer and political figure in Saskatchewan. He represented Gull Lake in the Legislative Assembly of Saskatchewan from 1934 to 1938.

He was born on a farm in Hebron, Nebraska, the son of Frank Herman Kemper and Louisa Haulker. In 1906, Kemper found work with a survey crew working on the railway west of Edmonton, Alberta. He returned home later that year but, in the summer of 1907, he traveled north again and worked on a farm near Moose Jaw, Saskatchewan. Later in 1907, he settled on a homestead south of Gull Lake. Kemper returned to Nebraska and married Mina Burwell in 1911. The couple returned to Saskatchewan later that same year. After working on a farm near Moose Jaw, they were able to purchase land not far from his original homestead. Kemper served on the rural municipal district council for Arlington.

He was also a director for the Saskatchewan section of the United Farmers of Canada. Kemper was elected during the 1934 Saskatchewan general election, representing Gull Lake as a member of the Farmer-Labour Group (FLG). The FLG was founded in 1932. In 1935, it changed its name and officially became the Saskatchewan section of the national Co-operative Commonwealth Federation or CCF. During the eighth provincial election on June 19, 1934, the FLG had five elected members come to office, including Kemper. He was defeated when he ran for reelection to the provincial assembly in Gull Lake in 1938 and in the Maple Creek federal riding in 1940.

In 1953, Kemper sold his farm and retired to the town of Shaunavon. He died in a car accident near Tompkins while travelling to a CCF rally.
