= Maple Creek (provincial electoral district) =

Former provincial electoral district in Saskatchewan, Canada

Coordinates: 49°50′N 109°25′W

Maple Creek is a former provincial electoral district for the Legislative Assembly of the province of Saskatchewan, Canada, centred on the town of Maple Creek. This district was one of 25 created for the 1st Saskatchewan general election in 1905. It was dissolved and merged with part of the Shaunavon riding before the 23rd Saskatchewan general election in 1995 to form the constituency of Cypress Hills.

== Other ==
A federal electoral district in the same area existed from 1914 to 1953.

A short-lived district of Maple Creek also existed in the Legislative Assembly of the North-West Territories, from 1902 to 1905 to serve the Maple Creek area prior to the creation of Saskatchewan, although it is not known whether the territorial district had the same boundaries as the later provincial district. It was represented by Horace Greeley for the entire duration of its existence as a territorial district.

== Members of the Legislative Assembly ==
#	MLA	Served	Party
1.	David James Wylie	1905 – 1917	Provincial Rights, Conservative
2.	Alexander John Colquhoun	1917 – 1921	Liberal
3.	Peter Lawrence Hyde	1921 – Dec. 1927	Liberal
4.	George Spence	1928 – 1934	Liberal
5.	John Mildenberger	1934 – 1944	Liberal
6.	Beatrice Trew	1944 – 1948	CCF
7.	Alex Cameron	1948 – 1971	Liberal
8.	Gene Flasch	1971 – 1975	New Democrat
9.	Bill Stodalka	1975 – 1978	Liberal
10.	Joan Duncan	1978 – 1991	Progressive Conservative
11.	Jack Goohsen	1991 – 1995	Progressive Conservative

== Election results ==
1905 Saskatchewan general election: Maple Creek electoral district
Party	Candidate	Votes	%	±%
Provincial Rights	David James Wylie	555	55.78%	–
Liberal	John Dixon	440	44.22%	–
Total		995	100.00%	

1908 Saskatchewan general election: Maple Creek electoral district
Party	Candidate	Votes	%	±%
Provincial Rights	David James Wylie	613	66.78%	+11.00
Liberal	William Richard Abbott	305	33.22%	-11.00
Total		918	100.00%	

1912 Saskatchewan general election: Maple Creek electoral district
Party	Candidate	Votes	%	±%
Conservative	David James Wylie	669	57.62%	-9.16
Liberal	N.L. Robson	492	42.38%	+9.16
Total		1,161	100.00%	

1917 Saskatchewan general election: Maple Creek electoral district
Party	Candidate	Votes	%	±%
Liberal	Alexander John Colquhoun	2,229	53.41%	+11.03
Conservative	David James Wylie	1,944	46.59%	-11.03
Total		4,173	100.00%	

1921 Saskatchewan general election: Maple Creek electoral district
Party	Candidate	Votes	%	±%
Liberal	Peter Lawrence Hyde	1,910	59.89%	+6.48
Independent	David Stuart Horne	1,279	40.11%	–
Total		3,189	100.00%	

1925 Saskatchewan general election: Maple Creek electoral district
Party	Candidate	Votes	%	±%
Liberal	Peter Lawrence Hyde	Acclaimed	100.00%	
Total		Acclamation		

December 1, 1927 By-Election: Maple Creek electoral district
Party	Candidate	Votes	%	±%
Liberal	George Spence	1,476	74.62%	-
Progressive	Charles Frederick Colburn	502	25.38%	–
Total		1,978	100.00%	

1929 Saskatchewan general election: Maple Creek electoral district
Party	Candidate	Votes	%	±%
Liberal	George Spence	2,104	53.09%	-21.53
Independent	David Stuart Horne	1,859	46.91%	-
Total		3,963	100.00%	

1934 Saskatchewan general election: Maple Creek electoral district
Party	Candidate	Votes	%	±%
Liberal	John Mildenberger	3,114	51.57%	-1.52
Conservative	James McDougald	1,784	29.55%	-
Farmer-Labour	Jacob James Hubening	1,140	18.88%	–
Total		6,038	100.00%	

1938 Saskatchewan general election: Maple Creek electoral district
Party	Candidate	Votes	%	±%
Liberal	John Mildenberger	4,058	52.32%	+0.75
Social Credit	Oliver Reid	2,136	27.54%	–
Unity	A.J. Mercer	1,562	20.14%	–
Total		7,756	100.00%	

1944 Saskatchewan general election: Maple Creek electoral district
Party	Candidate	Votes	%	±%
CCF	Beatrice Trew	3,656	49.15%	-
Liberal	John Mildenberger	2,872	38.61%	-13.71
Prog. Conservative	George C. Stewart	911	12.24%	-
Total		7,439	100.00%	

1948 Saskatchewan general election: Maple Creek electoral district
Party	Candidate	Votes	%	±%
Liberal	Alex Cameron	2,920	36.50%	-2.11
CCF	Beatrice Trew	2,590	32.37%	-16.78
Social Credit	A.J. Miller	2,491	31.13%	-
Total		8,001	100.00%	

1952 Saskatchewan general election: Maple Creek electoral district
Party	Candidate	Votes	%	±%
Liberal	Alex Cameron	3,671	52.73%	+16.23
CCF	Walter Melrose	3,291	47.27%	+14.90
Total		6,962	100.00%	

1956 Saskatchewan general election: Maple Creek electoral district
Party	Candidate	Votes	%	±%
Liberal	Alex Cameron	2,777	36.68%	-16.05
CCF	Les G. Benjamin	2,511	33.16%	-14.11
Social Credit	W. Alex Herle	2,284	30.16%	-
Total		7,572	100.00%	

1960 Saskatchewan general election: Maple Creek electoral district
Party	Candidate	Votes	%	±%
Liberal	Alex Cameron	3,086	43.19%	+6.51
CCF	Les G. Benjamin	2,360	33.02%	-0.14
Social Credit	Morris Reis	1,000	13.99%	-16.17
Progressive Conservative	Marlyn K. Clary	700	9.80%	-
Total		7,146	100.00%	

1964 Saskatchewan general election: Maple Creek electoral district
Party	Candidate	Votes	%	±%
Liberal	Alex Cameron	2,977	43.84%	+0.65
CCF	William P. Rolick	2,424	35.70%	+2.68
Progressive Conservative	Marlyn K. Clary	1,389	20.46%	+10.66
Total		6,790	100.00%	

1967 Saskatchewan general election: Maple Creek electoral district
Party	Candidate	Votes	%	±%
Liberal	Alex Cameron	2,683	48.44%	+4.60
NDP	Ernie Howes	1,901	34.32%	-1.38
Progressive Conservative	Marlyn K. Clary	955	17.24%	-3.22
Total		5,539	100.00%	

1971 Saskatchewan general election: Maple Creek electoral district
Party	Candidate	Votes	%	±%
NDP	Gene Flasch	2,858	47.84%	+13.52
Liberal	Alex Cameron	2,412	40.38%	-8.06
Progressive Conservative	Marlyn K. Clary	704	11.78%	-5.46
Total		5,974	100.00%	

1975 Saskatchewan general election: Maple Creek electoral district
Party	Candidate	Votes	%	±%
Liberal	Bill Stodalka	2,698	37.62%	-2.76
Progressive Conservative	Eric Richardson	2,241	31.25%	+19.47
NDP	Gene Flasch	2,232	31.13%	-16.71
Total		7,171	100.00%	

1978 Saskatchewan general election: Maple Creek electoral district
Party	Candidate	Votes	%	±%
Progressive Conservative	Joan Duncan	3,496	48.80%	+17.55
NDP	Norman Arndt	2,327	32.48%	+1.35
Liberal	W.V. (Fred) Deis	1,341	18.72%	-18.90
Total		7,164	100.00%	

1982 Saskatchewan general election: Maple Creek electoral district
Party	Candidate	Votes	%	±%
Progressive Conservative	Joan Duncan	4,228	55.53%	+6.73
NDP	J.R. Porter	2,158	28.34%	-4.14
Western Canada Concept	Larry English	806	10.59%	–
Liberal	Bernie Ford	422	5.54%	-13.18
Total		7,614	100.00%	

1986 Saskatchewan general election: Maple Creek electoral district
Party	Candidate	Votes	%	±%
Progressive Conservative	Joan Duncan	4,199	60.87%	+5.34
NDP	Barry Elderkin	2,185	31.68%	+3.34
Liberal	Harold Pawlitza	514	7.45%	+1.91
Total		6,898	100.00%	

1991 Saskatchewan general election: Maple Creek electoral district
Party	Candidate	Votes	%	±%
Prog. Conservative	Jack Goohsen	2,627	40.55%	-20.32
NDP	Bryan Oster	1,987	30.67%	-1.01
Liberal	Shirley Helmerson	1,865	28.78%	+21.33
Total		6,479	100.00%	

== See also ==
- List of Saskatchewan provincial electoral districts
- List of Saskatchewan general elections
- Canadian provincial electoral districts
- Maple Creek — North-West Territories territorial electoral district (1870–1905)
