= Arthur Kluzak =

Canadian politician

Arthur Kluzak (July 13, 1906 – October 24, 1996) was an American-born farmer, rancher, hotel owner, auto dealer and political figure in Saskatchewan. He represented Shaunavon from 1960 to 1964 in the Legislative Assembly of Saskatchewan as a Co-operative Commonwealth Federation (CCF) member.

He was born in East Grand Forks, Minnesota and came to the Canuck district with his family in 1912. He was married twice: first to Hazel in 1930 and then to Betty Miller in 1981. Kluzak was a grain buyer for the Saskatchewan Wheat Pool at Climax and at Tompkins. He served on the village council for Climax from 1954 to 1960 and on the school board for the Canuck district. Kluzak was defeated by Fernand Larochelle when he ran for reelection to the provincial assembly in 1964. He died in Calgary, Alberta at the age of 90.
