= Flasch (surname) =

Flasch is a German language surname.

== List of people with the surname ==
- Colton Flasch (born 1991), Canadian curler
- Gene Flasch, Canadian politician
- Kilian Caspar Flasch (1831–1891), German-born prelate of the Roman Catholic Church
- Kurt Flasch (born 1930), German philosopher

== See also ==
- Fläsch, Switzerland
