= Duncan McCuaig =

Duncan McCuaig may refer to:

- Duncan John McCuaig (1882–1960), Canadian member of parliament from Saskatchewan
- Duncan Fletcher McCuaig (1889–1950), Canadian member of parliament from Ontario
