= Cypress Hills (electoral district) =

Provincial electoral district in Saskatchewan, Canada

Coordinates: 50°00′N 108°50′W

Saskatchewan electoral district

Provincial electoral district
- Legislature: Legislative Assembly of Saskatchewan
MLA
Doug Steele
Saskatchewan
- District created: 1994
- First contested: 1995
- Last contested: 2020

Demographics
- Electors: 10,041
- Region: Southwestern Saskatchewan
- Communities: Maple Creek, Shaunavon

Cypress Hills is a provincial electoral district for the Legislative Assembly of Saskatchewan, Canada. Located in the extreme southwest corner of the province, this constituency was formed by the Representation Act, 1994 (Saskatchewan) through combining the districts of Shaunavon, Maple Creek, and portions of Swift Current.

The district has an economy based on agriculture, cattle ranching and major oil and gas production. The constituency also contains the Great Sand Hills in its northern areas and Cypress Hills Interprovincial Park. A near-complete Tyrannosaurus rex skeleton – one of only 12 in the world – was found near the town of Eastend.

The largest communities include Maple Creek and Shaunavon with populations of 2,270 and 1,775 respectively. Smaller centers in the district include the towns of Gull Lake, Leader, Cabri, Eastend and Burstall; and the villages of Frontier, Fox Valley, Tompkins, Alsask, Abbey, Webb and Consul.

An electoral district in the same area called "Cypress" existed from 1917 until 1934.

== Members of the Legislative Assembly ==
Legislature	Years	Member	Party
23rd	1995 – 1998	Jack Goohsen	Progressive Conservative
23rd	1999	Wayne Elhard	Saskatchewan Party
24th	1999 – 2003	Wayne Elhard	Saskatchewan Party
25th	2003 – 2007	Wayne Elhard	Saskatchewan Party
26th	2007 – 2011	Wayne Elhard	Saskatchewan Party
27th	2011 – 2016	Wayne Elhard	Saskatchewan Party
28th	2016 – 2020	Doug Steele	Saskatchewan Party
29th	2020 – 2024	Doug Steele	Saskatchewan Party
30th	2024 – present	Doug Steele	Saskatchewan Party

== Election results ==
2024 Saskatchewan general election
Party	Candidate	Votes	%	±%
Saskatchewan	Doug Steele	5,807	74.76	+9.63
New Democratic	Clare McNab	1,466	18.87	+9.40
Buffalo	Doug Wilson	495	6.37	-12.94
Total valid votes		7,768	99.56	
Total rejected ballots		34	0.44	
Turnout		7,802	57.06	
Eligible voters		13,673		
Saskatchewan hold		Swing		
Source: Elections Saskatchewan

2020 Saskatchewan general election
Party	Candidate	Votes	%	±%
Saskatchewan	Doug Steele	4,685	65.13	-14.36
Buffalo	Crystal Tiringer	1,389	19.31	–
New Democratic	Kelly Genert	681	9.47	-2.57
Progressive Conservative	John Goohsen	328	4.56	-0.69
Green	Dianna Holigroski	110	1.53	-0.30
Total valid votes		7,193	99.72	
Total rejected ballots		20	0.28	–
Turnout		7,213	–	–
Eligible voters		–		
Saskatchewan hold		Swing		–
Source: Elections Saskatchewan

2016 Saskatchewan general election
Party	Candidate	Votes	%	±%
Saskatchewan	Doug Steele	5,774	79.49	-3.41
New Democratic	Barb Genert	875	12.04	-0.31
Progressive Conservative	John Goohsen	382	5.25	-
Green	Marie Crowe	133	1.83	-2.92
Liberal	Charles Tait	99	1.36	-
Total valid votes		7,263	100.0	
Eligible voters		–		
Source: Elections Saskatchewan

2011 Saskatchewan general election: Cypress Hills
Party	Candidate	Votes	%	±%
Saskatchewan	Wayne Elhard	5,080	82.90	+7.18
NDP	Alex Mortensen	757	12.35	-3.61
Green	William Caton	291	4.75	+1.80
Total		6,128	100.00	

2007 Saskatchewan general election: Cypress Hills
Party	Candidate	Votes	%	±%
Saskatchewan	Wayne Elhard	5,357	75.72	+10.30
NDP	Jason Hicks	1,129	15.96	-4.85
Liberal	Josh Haugerud	321	4.54	-9.23
Green	Bill Clary	209	2.95	–
Western Independence	David Sawkiw	59	0.83	–
Total		7,075	100.00	

2003 Saskatchewan general election: Cypress Hills
Party	Candidate	Votes	%	±%
Saskatchewan	Wayne Elhard	4,458	65.42	+2.75
NDP	Eric August	1,418	20.81	+0.09
Liberal	Barry Thienes	938	13.77	-2.84
Total		6,814	100.00	

1999 Saskatchewan general election: Cypress Hills
Party	Candidate	Votes	%	±%
Saskatchewan	Wayne Elhard	4,138	62.67	+11.11
NDP	Keith Murch	1,368	20.72	-1.42
Liberal	Barry Thienes	1,097	16.61	-9.69
Total		6,603	100.00	

June 28, 1999 By-Election: Cypress Hills
Party	Candidate	Votes	%	±%
Saskatchewan	Wayne Elhard	2,958	51.56	–
Liberal	Barry Thienes	1,509	26.30	-10.10
NDP	Keith Murch	1,270	22.14	-3.15
Total		5,737	100.00	

1995 Saskatchewan general election: Cypress Hills
Party	Candidate	Votes	%	±%
Prog. Conservative	Jack Goohsen	2,863	38.31	–
Liberal	Barry Thienes	2,720	36.40	–
NDP	Carl Wenaas	1,890	25.29	–
Total		7,473	100.00	

== See also ==
- List of Saskatchewan provincial electoral districts
- List of Saskatchewan general elections
- Canadian provincial electoral districts
