= Alexander Colquhoun =

Alexander Colquhoun may refer to:

- Alexander John Colquhoun (1868–1951), Canadian politician
- Alexander Colquhoun (artist) (1862–1941), Scottish-born Australian painter, illustrator and art critic
