= James Beck Swanston =

Canadian politician

Member of Parliament for Maple Creek
- In office July 1930 – October 1935
- Preceded by: William George Bock
- Succeeded by: Charles Evans

Personal details
- Born: James Beck Swanston; 17 September 1878 Yeovil, Ontario, Canada
- Died: 8 July 1957 (aged 78)
- Party: Conservative
- Spouse(s): Isabelle Taylor m. 24 March 1910
- Profession: farmer, surgeon

James Beck Swanston (17 September 1878 – 8 July 1957) was a Conservative member of the House of Commons of Canada. He was born in Yeovil, Ontario and became a farmer and surgeon.

He was first elected to Parliament at the Maple Creek riding in the 1930 general election after unsuccessful campaigns there in 1925 and 1926. Swanston was defeated in the 1935 federal election by Charles Evans of the Liberal party.
