= Glen McPherson (Saskatchewan politician) =

Canadian politician

Member of the Saskatchewan Legislative Assembly for Wood River (Shaunavon; 1991–1995)
- In office October 21, 1991 – June 26, 2000
- Preceded by: Theodore Gleim
- Succeeded by: Yogi Huyghebaert

Personal details
- Born: Glen Allan McPherson; April 3, 1957 (age 69) Shaunavon, Saskatchewan, Canada
- Party: Saskatchewan Liberal (1995–2000); Saskatchewan New Democratic (1991–1995)

Glen Allan McPherson (born April 3, 1957) was a Canadian politician who served in the Legislative Assembly of Saskatchewan from 1991 to 1995, as a NDP member for the constituency of Shaunavon and from 1995 to 2000 as a Liberal member for Wood River.
