= Dwain Lingenfelter =

Canadian politician

The Honourable Dwain Lingenfelter ECS
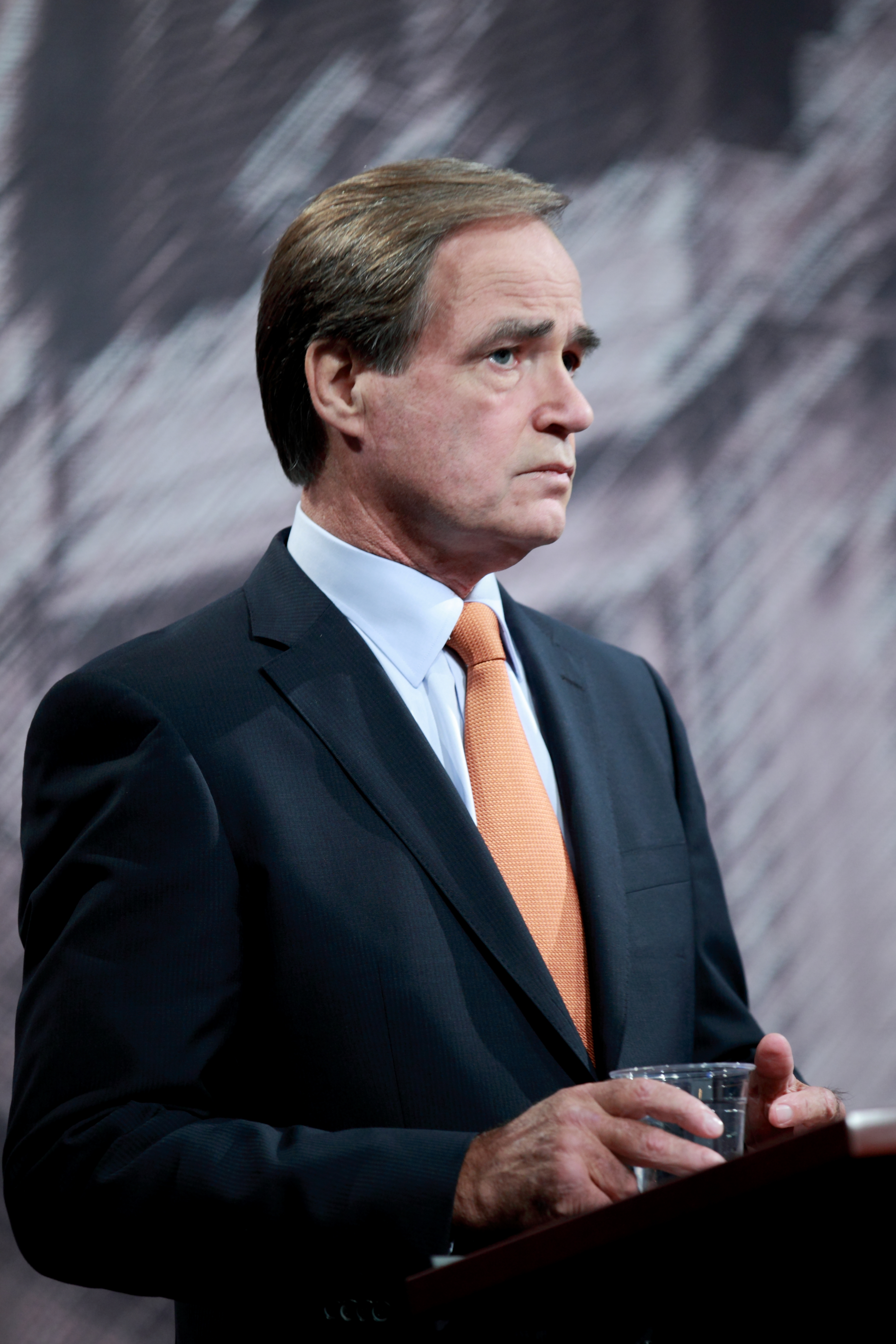
- Lingenfelter at the 2011 Leaders' Debate

Leader of the Opposition of Saskatchewan
- In office June 6, 2009 – November 7, 2011
- Preceded by: Lorne Calvert
- Succeeded by: John Nilson (Interim)

Leader of the Saskatchewan New Democratic Party
- In office June 6, 2009 – November 7, 2011
- Preceded by: Lorne Calvert
- Succeeded by: John Nilson (Interim)

Member of the Saskatchewan Legislative Assembly for Regina Douglas Park
- In office September 21, 2009 – October 10, 2011
- Preceded by: Harry Van Mulligen
- Succeeded by: Russ Marchuk

Member of the Saskatchewan Legislative Assembly for Regina Elphinstone
- In office May 4, 1988 – July 10, 2000
- Preceded by: Allan Blakeney
- Succeeded by: Warren McCall

Member of the Saskatchewan Legislative Assembly for Shaunavon
- In office October 18, 1978 – September 19, 1986
- Preceded by: Eiliv Anderson
- Succeeded by: Ted Gleim

Personal details
- Born: February 27, 1949 (age 77) Shaunavon, Saskatchewan
- Party: New Democratic Party
- Education: University of Saskatchewan
- Profession: Business executive Farmer

Dwain Lingenfelter (born February 27, 1949) is a former Canadian politician from Shaunavon, Saskatchewan. He was a New Democratic Party Member of the Legislative Assembly of Saskatchewan from 1978 to 1986, 1988 to 2000, and 2009 to 2011. He led the Saskatchewan NDP from 2009 to 2011, when he also served as leader of the Opposition.

Lingenfelter had a long political career in Saskatchewan and served in the cabinets of Allan Blakeney and Roy Romanow; he was the Opposition House Leader from 1982 to 1986, and also served as Deputy Premier to Romanow. In 2011, Lingenfelter became the first provincial NDP leader in Saskatchewan to lose his own seat in an election, and he retired from politics. Outside of politics, Lingenfelter has served on a variety of corporate and non-profit boards, and has directed CypressView Land, a farming and ranching business, since the 1990s.

== Early life, family, and career ==
Lingenfelter grew up on a family farm near Shaunavon, Saskatchewan, where his grandfather began homesteading in 1911. Lingenfelter grew up in a large family with eight other siblings. He attended Shaunavon High School and went on to earn a political science degree from the University of Saskatchewan. While in school, Lingenfelter played bass in a rock band. While working on his political science degree, Lingenfelter continued to farm and worked as a customs officer. He has remained in the farming business, running CypressView Land, a farming and ranching business near Shaunavon. CypressView owns over 26,000 acres and partners with Monette Farms, which is considered one of the province's "mega-farms".

Lingenfelter is married to Rubiela, with whom he has two children. He also has three children from another marriage.

== Political career ==
=== NDP MLA (1978–2000) ===
Lingenfelter was first elected to the Legislature in his home constituency of Shaunavon in the 1978 election. The NDP under Allan Blakeney won its third consecutive majority government in the election. In 1980, Lingenfelter joined the cabinet when he was appointed Minister of Social Services. The NDP were swept from power in the 1982 election by Grant Devine's Progressive Conservative Party; Lingenfelter was one of only nine NDP members elected. From 1982 to 1986, he served as the Opposition House Leader.

Lingenfelter lost his re-election bid in the 1986 election. In 1987, Lingenfelter ran and won the race for the presidency of the Saskatchewan NDP. However, with the Devine PCs winning a second majority government in 1986, Blakeney stepped down as NDP leader and retired from politics. Lingenfelter decided to run in the by-election to succeed Blakeney as MLA for Regina Elphinstone; he was successful, and re-joined the legislature in 1988 under new NDP leader Roy Romanow. Lingenfelter again served as Opposition House Leader, and was Opposition Critic on privatization at a time when Devine's government was attempting to privatize a range of public assets. In 1989, the NDP staged a walk-out at the Legislature, successfully derailing the government's attempt to privatize SaskEnergy.

After being re-elected in the 1991 election, which resulted in a large NDP majority, Lingenfelter returned to cabinet when he was named Minister of Economic Development. During the 1990s, Lingenfelter also served as the Minister responsible for the Crown Investments Corporation and Minister of Agriculture, as well as Deputy Premier and Government House Leader.

The NDP was reduced to a minority government in the 1999 election, narrowly fending off the fledgling Saskatchewan Party and forming a coalition government with the Liberals. In 2000, Romanow announced that he would be retiring, triggering a leadership race that would lead directly to the premier's office. As deputy premier, Lingenfelter had long been viewed as a likely candidate to succeed Romanow. However, earlier in 2000, Lingenfelter announced that he would be resigning to pursue private sector opportunities, suggesting he would be taking work in the oil industry. Romanow described Lingenfelter's resignation as a "huge loss for me, for our party, for our government and for the people of our province." Lingenfelter became vice-president of Government Relations for Calgary-based energy company Canadian Occidental Petroleum in September 2000.

=== NDP leader (2009–2011) ===
Romanow's successor, Lorne Calvert, announced his retirement in 2008, a year after losing the 2007 election to Brad Wall's Saskatchewan Party. Two weeks after Calvert's announcement, Lingenfelter became the first declared candidate in the leadership race. He was joined in the race by former party president Yens Pedersen, MLA Deb Higgins, and doctor Ryan Meili. Lingenfelter was considered the frontrunner, and by Spring 2009 had opened a wide lead in fundraising over his rivals ahead of the June 6 leadership election. However, Lingenfelter courted controversy when it was revealed that his campaign had signed up hundreds of new party members without their knowledge, and paid for 1,100 memberships. Lingenfelter blamed the issue on an "over exuberant" volunteer, while Pedersen called for him to quit the race. Lingenfelter stayed in the race, receiving a high number of caucus and union endorsements. On June 6, 2009, he was elected the new NDP leader, defeating Meili on the final ballot with 55% of the vote; the win made Lingenfelter the oldest leader in Saskatchewan NDP history.

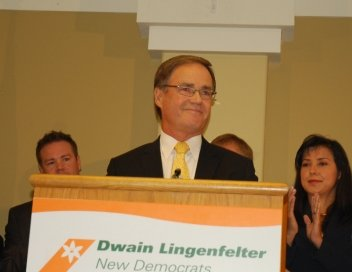
Lingenfelter announcing his NDP leadership candidacy in 2008.

After the leadership vote, MLA Harry Van Mulligen resigned his Regina Douglas Park seat to allow Lingenfelter to run in a by-election there. Lingenfelter won the by-election on September 21. As Opposition leader in the legislature, Lingenfelter became known for having heated exchanges with Premier Wall.

==== 2011 provincial election ====
Lingenfelter led the NDP into the 2011 provincial election. Polls ahead of the election suggested that Wall's Saskatchewan Party was heavily favoured to form another majority government, and the results bore this out. On November 7, the NDP was reduced to just nine seats, its worst showing since 1982. Lingenfelter also became the first NDP leader to lose his own seat in an election, and he tendered his resignation on election night, effective immediately. Lingenfelter later admitted that he felt "rusty and made lots of mistakes" during the campaign, but also that despite putting forward a good platform he did not expect to defeat what was a relatively new and popular Wall government.

After Lingenfelter's resignation, the NDP executive chose John Nilson to serve as interim party leader until a new leader was chosen. In 2013, the party elected Cam Broten as its new leader.

== After politics ==
Lingenfelter has since 2001 focused on his CypressView farming business; he has also taken contract positions in the Alberta energy industry, including a two-year contract with TransAlta from 2015 to 2017 working on renewable energy development. He has also taken up board positions in the non-profit sector, including with the Nature Conservancy of Canada and, as in 2021, the Canadian Wildlife Foundation.

== Electoral results ==
2011 Saskatchewan general election: Regina Douglas Park
Party	Candidate	Votes	%
Saskatchewan	Russ Marchuk	4,411	52.00
New Democratic	Dwain Lingenfelter	3,507	41.34
Green	Victor Lau	565	6.66
Total valid votes		8,483	100.00

2009 by election: Regina Douglas Park
Party	Candidate	Votes	%
New Democratic	Dwain Lingenfelter	3,115	50.25
Saskatchewan	Kathleen Peterson	2,613	42.15
Green	Victor Lau	471	7.60
Total valid votes		6,199	100.00

1999 Saskatchewan general election: Regina Elphinstone
Party	Candidate	Votes	%
New Democratic	Dwain Lingenfelter	2,689	51.07
Saskatchewan	Jo Ann Mohr	1,168	22.18
Liberal	Robert Ermel	1,109	21.06
New Green	John W. Warnock	243	4.62
Progressive Conservative	Brenda Rossow	56	1.06
Total valid votes		5,265	99.99

1995 Saskatchewan general election: Regina Elphinstone
Party	Candidate	Votes	%
New Democratic	Dwain Lingenfelter	4,042	67.06
Liberal	Gord Wasteste	1,520	25.22
Progressive Conservative	Jo Ann Mohr	465	7.72
Total valid votes		6,027	100.00

1991 Saskatchewan general election: Regina Elphinstone
Party	Candidate	Votes	%
New Democratic	Dwain Lingenfelter	6,505	72.02
Liberal	Cliff Chatterson	1,673	18.52
Progressive Conservative	Don Racette	854	9.46
Total valid votes		9,032	100.00

1988 by election: Regina Elphinstone
Party	Candidate	Votes	%
New Democratic	Dwain Lingenfelter	4,309	77.33
Progressive Conservative	Myrna Petersen	694	12.46
Liberal	Ron Eistetter	569	10.21
Total valid votes		5,572	100.00

1986 Saskatchewan general election: Shaunavon
Party	Candidate	Votes	%	±%
Progressive Conservative	Ted Gleim	3,311	47.70%	+11.35
NDP	Dwain Lingenfelter	2,968	42.76%	+4.19
Liberal	Jules Larochelle	662	9.54%	-0.38
Total		6,941	100.00%	

1982 Saskatchewan general election: Shaunavon
Party	Candidate	Votes	%	±%
NDP	Dwain Lingenfelter	2,897	38.57%	+0.56
Progressive Conservative	John Bleackley	2,730	36.35%	+7.00
Western Canada Concept	Barry W. Dixon	1,139	15.16%	–
Liberal	Gratton Murray	745	9.92%	-22.72
Total		7,511	100.00%	

1978 Saskatchewan general election: Shaunavon
Party	Candidate	Votes	%	±%
NDP	Dwain Lingenfelter	2,778	38.01%	--
Liberal	Eiliv "Sonny" Anderson	2,385	32.64%	--
Prog. Conservative	Jim Lacey	2,145	29.35%	--
Total		7,308	100.00%	
