= Allan Roy Oliver =

Canadian politician (1936–2021)

MLA for Shaunavon
- In office 1971–1975
- Preceded by: Fernand Larochelle
- Succeeded by: Eiliv Anderson

Personal details
- Born: 1936 Crichton, Saskatchewan
- Died: November 24, 2021 (aged 84–85)
- Party: Saskatchewan New Democratic Party

Allan Roy Oliver (1936 – November 24, 2021) was a Canadian politician who represented Shaunavon on the Legislative Assembly of the province of Saskatchewan from 1971 to 1975. He was a member of the Saskatchewan New Democratic Party.
