= Mildenberger =

Mildenberger is a German surname. Notable people with the surname include:

- John Joseph Mildenberger (1895–1976), Russian-born farmer, civil servant, educator, and political figure in Canada
- Karl Mildenberger (1937–2018), German boxer
