= William Harry Stodalka =

Canadian politician

MLA for Maple Creek
- In office 1975–1978
- Preceded by: Gene Flasch
- Succeeded by: Joan Duncan

Personal details
- Born: November 9, 1931 Richmound, Saskatchewan
- Died: March 6, 2025 (aged 93)
- Party: Saskatchewan Liberal Party
- Occupation: Educator, agriculture implement dealer

William Harry Stodalka (November 9, 1931–March 6, 2025) was a Canadian politician. He served in the Legislative Assembly of Saskatchewan from 1975 to 1978, as a Liberal member for the constituency of Maple Creek. He was born in Richmound, Saskatchewan to a German father and Scottish mother. He attended the University of Alberta where he earned a Masters of Arts and Bachelor of Education degree. He married Josephine Elizabeth Kambeitz in 1953 and had five children. He was a school superintendent.
