= Alvin Cecil Murray =

Canadian politician and farmer

Alvin Cecil Murray (July 27, 1895 – September 1949) was a farmer and political figure in Saskatchewan. He represented Gull Lake from 1944 to 1949 in the Legislative Assembly of Saskatchewan as a Co-operative Commonwealth Federation (CCF) member.

He was born in Burford, Ontario, the son of John Murray and Jane Hartley, and was educated in Burford and Regina, Saskatchewan. In 1917, Murray married Bertha Bailey. He lived in Tompkins, Saskatchewan. Murray died in office at the age of 54.
