= Peter Lawrence Hyde =

Canadian politician

Peter Lawrence Hyde (April 24, 1884 – 1962) was a civic official and political figure in Saskatchewan. He represented Maple Creek in the Legislative Assembly of Saskatchewan from 1921 to 1927 as a Liberal.

He was born in Silverton, Manitoba, the son of Peter Hyde and Margaret Forbes, and was educated in Portage la Prairie. In 1912, Hyde married Nellie Hainstock. He taught school for 6 years and later served as a municipal clerk. Hyde lived in Hatton, Saskatchewan.
