= David James Wylie =

Canadian politician

David James "Joe" Wylie (1 July 1859 – 26 September 1932) was an English-born civil engineer, farmer, rancher and political figure in Saskatchewan. He represented Maple Creek in the Legislative Assembly of Saskatchewan from 1905 to 1917 as a Provincial Rights Party member.

He was born in Shrewsbury and was educated at Cheltenham College. His sister was Barbara Wylie, the British suffragette. Wylie came to Canada in 1880, settling in Manitoba. In 1882, he moved to Medicine Hat in the North-West Territories' District of Assiniboia. Wylie served with the Rocky Mountain Rangers during the North-West Rebellion of 1885. In 1889, he married Rachel Botterill. Wylie farmed near Lethbridge and then became manager for the Sir John Lister Kaye Ranch near Maple Creek. In 1897, he became manager for the Maple Creek Cattle Company. Around 1905, he bought out the company. Wylie raised horses for a time but was mainly raising cattle. He was defeated by Alexander John Colquhoun when he ran for reelection in 1917. Wylie ran unsuccessfully for a seat in the Canadian House of Commons in 1921 as a Conservative.
