= Eiliv Anderson =

Canadian politician (1934-2021)

Member of the Saskatchewan Legislative Assembly for Shaunavon
- In office 1975–1978
- Preceded by: Allan Oliver
- Succeeded by: Dwain Lingenfelter

Personal details
- Born: Eiliv Howard Anderson; July 20, 1934 Robsart, Saskatchewan, Canada
- Died: September 1, 2021 (aged 87) Swift Current, Saskatchewan, Canada
- Party: Liberal
- Spouse: Joy Brekhus (m. 1962)
- Occupation: Rancher, businessman, politician

Eiliv Howard "Sonny" Anderson (July 20, 1934 – September 1, 2021) was a Canadian rancher, businessman and politician in Saskatchewan. He represented Shaunavon in the Legislative Assembly of Saskatchewan from 1975 to 1978 as a member of the Liberal Party.

== Early life and career ==
Anderson was born on July 20, 1934, on the family farm west of Robsart, Saskatchewan, the son of Thore and Randine Anderson.

He spent much of his life in the cattle country of southwestern Saskatchewan, working as a rancher and taking on a range of other ventures, including commercial trucking. He was active in the province's beef industry, serving as a director of the Saskatchewan Stock Growers Association and the Saskatchewan Federation of Agriculture, and he helped to establish the Saskatchewan Beef Information Centre.

In 1962 he married Joy Brekhus.

He was a corporate executive, with a degree from the executive program of Queen's University's School of Business. He served as president of a consulting firm, as well as a rancher, before being elected as an MLA in 1975 for Shaunavon. However, he lost that riding to Dwain Lingenfelter in 1978. He served as an organizer for the Liberal Party of Saskatchewan, and was an influential man in the Canadian beef industry and the provincial government. He was awarded the Queen's Silver Jubilee Medal in 1977 for his work.

== Farm Credit Corporation ==
From 1982 until 1987, Anderson was chairman and chief executive officer of the Farm Credit Corporation, the federal Crown corporation that lends to Canadian farmers.

== Death ==
Anderson died in Swift Current, Saskatchewan on September 1, 2021, at the age of 87.

== Sources ==
- Canadian Who's Who 1997 entry

Legislative Assembly of Saskatchewan
Preceded by Allan Oliver, NDP	MLA for Shaunavon; 1975–1978	Succeeded by Dwain Lingenfelter, NDP
