= Alexander C. Cameron =

Canadian politician

Alexander C. Cameron (June 30, 1907 – January 16, 1996) was an educator, garage owner, and political figure in Saskatchewan. He represented Maple Creek as a Liberal from 1948 to 1971 in the Legislative Assembly of Saskatchewan.

He was born in Avonhurst, Saskatchewan, and was educated at Campion College in Regina, and at the University of Saskatchewan. Cameron taught in several schools in southwest Saskatchewan and was high school principal in Richmound. In 1935, he married Miriam Stodalka. From 1941 to 1960, he operated a garage in Richmound in partnership with his brother-in-law, John (Jack) Stodalka. Cameron also served as the village's mayor. He ran for the leadership of the provincial Liberals in 1959, losing to Ross Thatcher. Cameron was a member of the provincial cabinet, serving as Minister of Mineral Resources and Minister of Telephones. He was defeated by Gene Flasch when he ran for reelection to the provincial assembly in 1971. Cameron also served as president of the provincial Liberal party. He died in Regina at the age of 88.
