= Dave Marit =

Canadian politician

The Honourable Dave Marit ECS MLA

Minister of Agriculture
- Incumbent
- Assumed office December 11, 2025
- Preceded by: Daryl Harrison
- In office August 15, 2018 – November 7, 2024
- Preceded by: Lyle Stewart
- Succeeded by: Daryl Harrison

Minister of Highways and Infrastructure
- In office November 7, 2024 – December 11, 2025
- Preceded by: Lori Carr
- Succeeded by: Kim Gartner
- In office August 23, 2016 – August 15, 2018
- Preceded by: Nancy Heppner
- Succeeded by: Lori Carr

Member of the Legislative Assembly
- Incumbent
- Assumed office April 4, 2016
- Preceded by: Yogi Huyghebaert
- Constituency: Wood River

Personal details
- Party: Saskatchewan Party

David Marit is a Canadian politician who was elected to the Legislative Assembly of Saskatchewan in the 2016 provincial election. He represents the electoral district of Wood River as a member of the Saskatchewan Party and has been Minister of Agriculture in the cabinet of Premier Scott Moe since 2018. He had previously been Minister of Highways and Infrastructure in the government of Brad Wall from 2016 to 2018.

== Electoral record ==
2024 Saskatchewan general election: Wood River
Party	Candidate	Votes	%	±%
Saskatchewan	Dave Marit	5,700	68.26	-14.53
New Democratic	Mike Topola	1,549	18.55	+4.54
Progressive Conservative	Clint Arnason	553	6.62	+6.62
Saskatchewan United	Todd McIntyre	495	5.93	+5.93
Green	Melvin Pylypchuk	54	0.65	-2.48
Total valid votes		8,351	99.22	
Total rejected ballots		66	0.78	+0.19
Turnout		8,417	63.26	–
Eligible voters		13,306		
Saskatchewan hold		Swing		–
Source: Elections Saskatchewan

2020 Saskatchewan general election: Wood River
Party	Candidate	Votes	%	±%
Saskatchewan	Dave Marit	6,413	82.79	+6.72
New Democratic	Roger Morgan	1,085	14.01	+1.71
Green	Kimberly Soo Goodtrack	248	3.20	+0.72
Total valid votes		7,746	99.41	
Total rejected ballots		46	0.59	–
Turnout		7,792	–	–
Eligible voters		–		
Saskatchewan hold		Swing		–
Source: Elections Saskatchewan

2016 Saskatchewan general election: Wood River
Party	Candidate	Votes	%	±%
Saskatchewan	Dave Marit	6,125	76.07	-6.03
New Democratic	Brenda Shenher	991	12.30	-2.42
Progressive Conservative	Brian Archer	544	6.75	-
Green	Judy Mergel	200	2.48	-0.77
Liberal	Edward Ives	191	2.37	-
Total valid votes		8,051	100.0	
Eligible voters		–		
Source: Elections Saskatchewan

== Cabinet positions ==
Saskatchewan provincial government of Scott Moe
Cabinet posts (4)
Predecessor	Office	Successor
Daryl Harrison	Minister of Agriculture; December 11, 2025 –	Incumbent
Lori Carr	Minister of Highways and Infrastructure; November 7, 2024 – December 11, 2025	Kim Gartner
Lyle Stewart	Minister of Agriculture; August 15, 2018 – November 7, 2024	Daryl Harrison
cont'd from Wall Ministry	Minister of Highways and Infrastructure; February 2, 2018 – August 15, 2018	Lori Carr
Saskatchewan provincial government of Brad Wall
Cabinet post (1)
Predecessor	Office	Successor
Nancy Heppner	Minister of Highways and Infrastructure; August 23, 2016 – February 2, 2018	cont'd into Moe Ministry
