= John Joseph Mildenberger =

Canadian politician

John Joseph Mildenberger MBE, (September 29, 1895 – August 8, 1976) was an Imperial Russian-born farmer, civil servant, educator and political figure in Saskatchewan. He represented Maple Creek from 1934 to 1944 in the Legislative Assembly of Saskatchewan as a Liberal.

He was born in Straßburg in the Odessa region of South Russia, of German descent. He came to Saskatchewan with his family in 1902. Mildenberger was educated at St. Boniface College in Manitoba and at the University of Saskatchewan. He trained as a pilot in the Royal Canadian Air Force near the end of World War I. Mildenberger taught school for a number of years before being hired as a collector for the International Harvester Company. He then served as secretary for the village of Burstall, Saskatchewan, was a partner in the local Massey-Harris agency and also taught in the village school. In 1924, he married Lydia Karlenzig. The family also owned a farm north of Burstall. Mildenberger was paymaster for the local militia before World War II and served overseas during the war with the Saskatoon Light Infantry Machine Gun Battalion. After the war, he worked for the Prairie Farm Rehabilitation Association. Mildenberger was defeated by Beatrice Trew when he ran for reelection in 1944. He died in Insinger at the age of 80.
