= Duncan John McCuaig =

Canadian politician and farmer

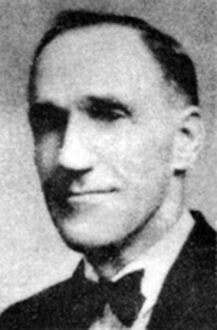

Member of Parliament for Maple Creek
- In office 1945–1949
- Preceded by: Charles Evans
- Succeeded by: Irvin Studer

Personal details
- Born: May 22, 1882 Brechin, Ontario
- Died: July 20, 1960 (aged 78) Eastend, Saskatchewan
- Party: Co-operative Commonwealth Federation
- Profession: Farmer

Duncan John McCuaig (May 22, 1882 – July 20, 1960) was a Canadian farmer and political figure in Saskatchewan, Canada. He represented Maple Creek in the House of Commons of Canada from 1945 to 1949 as a CCF member.

He was born in Brechin, Ontario. McCuaig worked 13 years in the Cobalt silver mine before moving west around 1912, settling in the Eastend, Saskatchewan area. He served as reeve for White Valley. McCuaig was married twice: to Audra "Molly" Anderson in 1905 and to Ethel Glassford in 1940 after his first wife's death. He died of heart failure at the age of 78.
