= William George Bock =

Canadian politician

Member of the Canadian Parliament for Maple Creek
- In office 1927–1930
- Preceded by: George Spence
- Succeeded by: James Beck Swanston

Personal details
- Born: June 11, 1884 Port Elgin, Ontario, Canada
- Died: March 28, 1973 (aged 88)
- Party: Liberal
- Occupation: farmer

William George Bock (born June 11, 1884, in Port Elgin, Ontario, Canada – d. March 28, 1973) was a Canadian politician and farmer. He was elected in a November 25, 1927 by-election, after the resignation of George Spence on October 14, as a Member of the Liberal Party to represent the riding of Maple Creek. He was defeated in the 1930 election. In total, he served 2 years and 8 months in federal service. After his political career, he authored two books called The Book of Humbug and The Book of Skeletons, published in 1958 and 1960 respectively, by Modern Press.
