= Joan Duncan =

Canadian politician

Joan Heather Duncan, née Tratch (October 30, 1941 – September 23, 2015) was a pharmacist and politician in Saskatchewan. She represented Maple Creek from 1978 to 1991 in the Legislative Assembly of Saskatchewan as a Progressive Conservative.

She was born in Cudworth, Saskatchewan, the daughter of John Tratch and Edna Blakle, and was educated in Wakaw and at the University of Saskatchewan, where she studied pharmacy. In 1964, she married Donald John Duncan. Together they owned and operated Duncan's Drug Store in Maple Creek.

Duncan was first elected to the Saskatchewan Legislature in 1978 and served as a Progressive Conservative MLA for the Maple Creek constituency until 1991. Duncan and Patricia Anne Smith were the first female Cabinet ministers appointed to Executive Council in Saskatchewan. Duncan served in the Grant Devine Government as Minister of Government Services (1982–1983); Minister of Revenue, Supply and Services (1982–1983); Minister of Revenue and Financial Services (1983); Minister of Supply and Services (1983); Minister of Consumer and Commercial Affairs (1983–1988); Minister of Co-operation and Co-operative Development (1986–1987) and Minister of Economic Development and Tourism (1988–1989).

Duncan was Minister Responsible for Saskatchewan Government Printing Company (1982–1983), Board of Revenue Commissioners (1982–1983), Public Service Superannuation Board (1982–1983), Public Employees Superannuation Plan (1983), Saskatchewan Development Fund (1982–1983), Office of the Rentalsman (1983–1987) Rent Appeal Commission (1983–1987) Provincial Mediation Board (1983–1987), Saskatchewan Securities Commission (1983–1985), Saskatchewan Minerals (1983–1986), Saskatchewan Government Insurance (1986–1988), Agricultural Implements Board (1985–1988) and Saskatchewan Economic Development Corporation (SEDCO) (1988–1989).

In 1989, Duncan was dropped from cabinet and she did not run for reelection in 1991.

In 1995, she pleaded guilty to defrauding the government of Saskatchewan of $12,405. Duncan agreed to pay back the money and pay a $5,000 fine.

Duncan died on September 23, 2015.
