= Doug Steele =

Canadian politician

Doug Steele MLA

Member of the Saskatchewan Legislative Assembly for Cypress Hills
- Incumbent
- Assumed office April 4, 2016
- Preceded by: Wayne Elhard

Personal details
- Party: Saskatchewan Party
- Spouse: Phyllis
- Profession: Farmer

Doug Steele is a Canadian politician, who was elected to the Legislative Assembly of Saskatchewan in the 2016 provincial election. He represents the electoral constituency of Cypress Hills as a member of the Saskatchewan Party.

Prior to entering provincial politics, Steele served on the council for the Rural Municipality of Gull Lake for approximately two decades, most recently as reeve. He has been a director of Division 3 of the Saskatchewan Association of Rural Municipalities, and was the vice-president of the Association at the time he was nominated by the Saskatchewan Party. He resigned his position with SARM when he was nominated. He has been active in raising farming issues both locally and internationally. He also served on several local boards, such as the school board and the ambulance board.

The nomination to represent the Saskatchewan Party was closely contested, with Steele and Elaine Anderson both seeking the nomination. Steele won the nomination by 16 votes over Anderson.

In the general election, Steele faced candidates from four other parties. He won the riding by almost 80% of the vote. His closest competitor was Barb Genert for the New Democratic Party, who came in second with just over 12% of the vote.

Steele lives in the Gull Lake area and operates a mixing cattle and grain farm with his wife Phyllis. They have three adult children and one grandchild.

== Election results ==
2016 Saskatchewan general election: Cypress Hills
| Party | Candidate | Votes | % | ±% |
|---|---|---|---|---|
| Saskatchewan | Doug Steele | 5,774 | 79.5% | -3.4% |
| New Democratic | Barb Genert | 875 | 12.0% | -0.4% |
| Progressive Conservative | John Gooshen | 382 | 5.3% | +5.3% |
| Green | Marie Crowe | 133 | 1.8% | -3.0% |
| Liberal | Charles Tait | 99 | 1.4% | +1.4% |
| Total | | 7,263 | 100.00% | |
