= Chinook School Division =

School district in Saskatchewan, Canada

Chinook School Division No. 211 is a school district headquartered in Swift Current, Saskatchewan.

In April 2017 the district was to eliminate the rough equivalent of nine teaching positions, as its budget was in a deficit of $6 million. In the 2017–2018 school year, the district could have possibly cut some teacher positions due to a budget deficit from Saskatchewan authorities. In 2018, Saskatchewan authorities were to give the district an extra $140,000 for the 2019-2020 fiscal year, though the district leadership stated more money was needed.

== Schools ==
- Burstall School
- Cabri School
- CAMPS logo
- Central School
- Chinook Cyber School
- Chinook International Program
- Consul School
- Eastend School
- École Centennial School
- Fairview School
- Fox Valley School
- Frontier School
- Gull Lake School
- Hazlet School
- Herbert School
- Hodgeville School
- Leader Composite School
- Maple Creek Composite School
- Maverick High School
- O.M. Irwin School
- Ponteix School
- Shaunavon High School
- Shaunavon Public School
- Sidney Street School
- Stewart Valley School
- Success School
- Swift Current Comprehensive High School
- Tompkins School
- Val Marie School
- Vanguard School
- Waldeck School
- Wymark School
