= Beatrice Trew =

Canadian politician

- Born: Beatrice Janet Trew; December 4, 1897; Coates Mills, New Brunswick, Canada
- Died: June 4, 1976 (aged 78); Lemsford, Saskatchewan, Canada
- Occupation: Politician

Beatrice Janet Trew (December 4, 1897 - June 4, 1976) was a Canadian politician. She received teacher training in Fredericton and moved to a school at Manor, Saskatchewan in 1917. The following year she taught at Lemsford, where she met and married J. Albert Trew, a district farmer. When the 'Lemsford Homemakers Club' was formed in 1920, she was elected first secretary-treasurer. She later became president of the Swift Current district Homemakers. In 1944 she was elected MLA for Maple Creek. Defeated in 1948, she returned to her active role in Homemakers and in the local church; she received a life membership in the Lemsford Homemakers Club.

Trew was a member of the national council of the CCF for eleven years, and vice-president of the Saskatchewan section of the party for eight years. When the Saskatchewan Farmers Union was organized in 1950, she and her husband joined; she became women's district director in 1953, and was elected women's president of the provincial farm union in 1958, a post she held for five years. She represented farm union women at three meetings of the Associated Country Women. Trew was a member of the Thompson Advisory Planning Committee on Medical Care, which in 1961 laid the groundwork for Canada's first universal medical care plan. The committee study took her to England, the Netherlands, Norway, Sweden, and Denmark. She died in a traffic accident on June 4, 1976.

She is the grandmother of long-time Regina NDP MLA Kim Trew
