= Neil Haman McTaggart =

Canadian politician

Member of Parliament for Maple Creek
- In office 1921–1925
- Preceded by: John Archibald Maharg
- Succeeded by: George Spence

Personal details
- Born: 30 December 1882 near Guelph, Ontario, Canada
- Died: 28 January 1962 (aged 79) Weyburn, Saskatchewan, Canada
- Party: Progressive Party of Canada
- Spouse(s): Gladys Elizabeth Brown m. 26 Oct 1920
- Profession: farmer

Neil Haman McTaggart (30 December 1882 – 28 January 1962) was a farmer and political figure in Saskatchewan, Canada. He represented Maple Creek in the House of Commons of Canada from 1921 to 1925 as a Progressive Party member.

He was born on a farm near Guelph, Ontario and travelled west to Indian Head, Saskatchewan in 1905, later settling on land near Gull Lake. McTaggart grew grain and raised some livestock. In 1920, he married Gladys Elizabeth Brown. McTaggart was defeated when he ran for reelection in 1925. He died in 1962.
