= Gene Flasch =

Canadian politician (1931–2026)

MLA for Maple Creek
- In office 28 July 1971 – 13 May 1975
- Preceded by: Alexander C. Cameron
- Succeeded by: William Harry Stodalka

Personal details
- Born: 15 November 1931 Wilkie, Saskatchewan, Canada
- Died: 24 August 2026 (aged 94)
- Party: Saskatchewan New Democratic Party

Eugene Fredrick Flasch (15 November 1931 – 24 August 2026) was a Canadian politician who was the NDP MLA for Maple Creek between 1971 and 1975. He died on 24 August 2026, at the age of 94.
