= Wood River (electoral district) =

Provincial electoral district in Saskatchewan, Canada

Coordinates: 49°40′N 106°50′W

Saskatchewan electoral district

Provincial electoral district
- Legislature: Legislative Assembly of Saskatchewan
MLA
Dave Marit
Saskatchewan
- District created: 1994
- First contested: 1995
- Last contested: 2020

Demographics
- Electors: 10,005
- Census division(s): Division 3, 4, 7, 8

Wood River is a provincial electoral district for the Legislative Assembly of Saskatchewan, Canada. Located in southern Saskatchewan, the district was created by the Representation Act, 1994 (Saskatchewan) out of parts of the former Assiniboia-Gravelbourg and Shaunavon constituencies. The district takes its name from the RM of Wood River, which is located in the centre of the constituency.

Communities in the riding include the towns of Assiniboia, Ponteix, Rockglen, Gravelbourg, Mossbank and Lafleche; and the villages of Vanguard, Wood Mountain, Hodgeville, Mankota, Bracken and Val Marie.

== Members of the Legislative Assembly ==
Legislature	Years	Member	Party
23rd	1995 – 1999	Glen McPherson	Liberal
24th	1999 – 2000	Glen McPherson	Liberal
24th	2000 – 2003	Yogi Huyghebaert	Saskatchewan Party
25th	2003 – 2007	Yogi Huyghebaert	Saskatchewan Party
26th	2007 – 2011	Yogi Huyghebaert	Saskatchewan Party
27th	2011 – 2016	Yogi Huyghebaert	Saskatchewan Party
28th	2016 – 2020	Dave Marit	Saskatchewan Party
29th	2020 – 2024	Dave Marit	Saskatchewan Party
30th	2024 – present	Dave Marit	Saskatchewan Party

== Election results ==
2024 Saskatchewan general election
Party	Candidate	Votes	%	±%
Saskatchewan	Dave Marit	5,700	68.26	-14.53
New Democratic	Mike Topola	1,549	18.55	+4.54
Progressive Conservative	Clint Arnason	553	6.62	–
Saskatchewan United	Todd McIntyre	495	5.93	–
Green	Melvin Pylypchuk	54	0.65	-2.48
Total valid votes		8,351	99.22	
Total rejected ballots		66	0.78	+0.19
Turnout		8,417	63.26	–
Eligible voters		13,306		
Saskatchewan hold		Swing		–
Source: Elections Saskatchewan

2020 Saskatchewan general election
Party	Candidate	Votes	%	±%
Saskatchewan	Dave Marit	6,413	82.79	+6.72
New Democratic	Roger Morgan	1,085	14.01	+1.71
Green	Kimberly Soo Goodtrack	248	3.20	+0.72
Total valid votes		7,746	99.41	
Total rejected ballots		46	0.59	–
Turnout		7,792	–	–
Eligible voters		–		
Saskatchewan hold		Swing		–
Source: Elections Saskatchewan

2016 Saskatchewan general election
Party	Candidate	Votes	%	±%
Saskatchewan	Dave Marit	6,125	76.07	-6.03
New Democratic	Brenda Shenher	991	12.30	-2.42
Progressive Conservative	Brian Archer	544	6.75	-
Green	Judy Mergel	200	2.48	-0.77
Liberal	Edward Ives	191	2.37	-
Total valid votes		8,051	100.0	
Eligible voters		–		
Source: Elections Saskatchewan

|

2011 Saskatchewan general election: Wood River electoral district
Party	Candidate	Votes	%	±%
Saskatchewan	D.F. (Yogi) Huyghebaert	5,354	82.03	+12.44
NDP	Randy Gaudry	961	14.72	-2.54
Green	Amelia Swiderski	212	3.25	+1.02
Total		6,527	100.00%	

|

2007 Saskatchewan general election: Wood River electoral district
Party	Candidate	Votes	%	±%
Saskatchewan	D.F. (Yogi) Huyghebaert	5,323	69.59	+14.27
NDP	Steve Ryan	1,320	17.26	-8.72
Liberal	Michael Klein	768	10.04	-6.03
Green	Lynn Arrayel	171	2.23	-
Western Independence	Rocky Young	67	0.88	-1.75
Total		7,649	100.00%	

|

2003 Saskatchewan general election: Wood River electoral district
Party	Candidate	Votes	%	±%
Saskatchewan	D.F. (Yogi) Huyghebaert	4,350	55.32	-9.77
NDP	Trevor Davies	2,043	25.98	+9.02
Liberal	Louis Stringer	1,264	16.07	+4.52
Western Independence	Nick Yorga	207	2.63	–
Total		7,864	100.00%	

|

2000 By-election: Wood River electoral district
Party	Candidate	Votes	%	±%
Saskatchewan	D.F. (Yogi) Huyghebaert	4,384	65.09	+25.35
NDP	Robert Anderson	1,142	16.96	-3.55
Liberal	Jerry Ruehs	778	11.55	-28.20
New Green	Peter Borch	431	6.40	–
Total		6,735	100.00%	

|

1999 Saskatchewan general election: Wood River electoral district
Party	Candidate	Votes	%	±%
Liberal	Glen McPherson	3,163	39.75	-8.27
Saskatchewan	D.F. (Yogi) Huyghebaert	3,162	39.74	–
NDP	Robert Anderson	1,632	20.51	-9.89
Total		7,957	100.00%	

|

1995 Saskatchewan general election: Wood River electoral district
Party	Candidate	Votes	%	±%
Liberal	Glen McPherson	4,146	48.02	–
NDP	Allen Engel	2,624	30.40	–
Prog. Conservative	D.F. (Yogi) Huyghebaert	1,863	21.58	–
Total		8,633	100.00%	

== 1999 Election controversy ==
In 1999, a controversy erupted in the Wood River constituency as Saskatchewan Party candidate Yogi Huyghebaert tied Liberal candidate Glen McPherson. The returning officer cast the deciding vote in favour of McPherson, giving the Liberals four seats. This result was later thrown out in court and a by-election was ordered in June 2000. McPherson did not run and Huyghebaert then won a resounding victory.

== See also ==
- List of Saskatchewan provincial electoral districts
- List of Saskatchewan general elections
- Canadian provincial electoral districts
