= Shaunavon (electoral district) =

Former provincial electoral district in Saskatchewan, Canada

Coordinates: 49°40′N 108°25′W

Shaunavon is a former provincial electoral district for the Legislative Assembly of the province of Saskatchewan, Canada. This district was created before the 8th Saskatchewan general election in 1934 as "Gull Lake". Redrawn and renamed "Shaunavon" in 1952, the constituency was abolished before the 23rd Saskatchewan general election in 1995.

It is now part of the districts of Wood River and Cypress Hills.

== Members of the Legislative Assembly ==
=== Gull Lake (1934–1952) ===
#	MLA	Served	Party
1.	Herman Henry Kemper	1934 – 1938	Farmer-Labour
2.	Harvey Harold McMahon	1938 – 1944	Liberal
3.	Al Murray	1944 – 1949	CCF
4.	Thomas Bentley	Nov. 1949 – 1952	CCF

=== Shaunavon (1952–1995) ===
#	MLA	Served	Party
1.	Thomas Bentley	1952 – 1960	CCF
2.	Arthur Kluzak	1960 – 1964	CCF
3.	Fernand Larochelle	1964 – 1971	Liberal
4.	Allan Oliver	1971 – 1975	New Democrat
5.	Eiliv "Sonny" Anderson	1975 – 1978	Liberal
6.	Dwain Lingenfelter	1978 – 1986	New Democrat
7.	Ted Gleim	1986 – 1991	Progressive Conservative
8.	Glen McPherson	1991 – 1995	New Democrat

== Election results ==
=== Gull Lake (1934–1952) ===
1934 Saskatchewan general election: Gull Lake electoral district
Party	Candidate	Votes	%	±%
Farmer-Labour	Herman Henry Kemper	2,404	38.27%	–
Liberal	Sydney John Smith	2,153	34.27%	–
Conservative	John Frederick Frook	1,725	27.46%	–
Total		6,282	100.00%	

1938 Saskatchewan general election: Gull Lake electoral district
Party	Candidate	Votes	%	±%
Liberal	Harvey Harold McMahon	3,901	51.11%	+16.84
CCF	Herman Henry Kemper	3,732	48.89%	+10.62
Total		7,633	100.00%	

1944 Saskatchewan general election: Gull Lake electoral district
Party	Candidate	Votes	%	±%
CCF	Al Murray	3,942	52.57%	+3.68
Liberal	Harvey Harold McMahon	2,200	29.34%	-21.77
Prog. Conservative	Charles H. Howlett	1,356	18.09%	-
Total		7,498	100.00%	

1948 Saskatchewan general election: Gull Lake electoral district
Party	Candidate	Votes	%	±%
CCF	Al Murray	4,251	52.03%	-0.54
Liberal-Progressive Conservative	Jonas A. Johnson	2,983	36.51%	–
Social Credit	William E. Cowie	936	11.46%	–
Total		8,170	100.00%	

November 10, 1949 By-Election: Gull Lake electoral district
Party	Candidate	Votes	%	±%
CCF	Thomas Bentley	3,627	51.36%	-0.67
Liberal	Harold M. Haney	2,792	39.54%	-
Prog. Conservative	Charles H. Howlett	643	9.10%	-
Total		7,062	100.00%	

=== Shaunavon (1952–1995) ===
1952 Saskatchewan general election: Shaunavon electoral district
Party	Candidate	Votes	%	±%
CCF	Thomas Bentley	3,625	54.22%	+2.86
Liberal	H. Loken	3,061	45.78%	+6.24
Total		6,686	100.00%	

1956 Saskatchewan general election: Shaunavon electoral district
Party	Candidate	Votes	%	±%
CCF	Thomas Bentley	3,185	45.00%	-9.22
Liberal	Fernand Larochelle	2,545	35.96%	-9.82
Social Credit	Lloyd J. Hunter	1,348	19.04%	-
Total		7,078	100.00%	

1960 Saskatchewan general election: Shaunavon electoral district
Party	Candidate	Votes	%	±%
CCF	Arthur Kluzak	2,743	39.28%	-5.72
Liberal	Fernand Larochelle	2,516	36.02%	+0.06
Social Credit	Lloyd J. Hunter	876	12.54%	-6.50
Prog. Conservative	Donald McLennan	849	12.16%	-
Total		6,984	100.00%	

1964 Saskatchewan general election: Shaunavon electoral district
Party	Candidate	Votes	%	±%
Liberal	Fernand Larochelle	2,955	43.94%	+7.92
CCF	Arthur Kluzak	2,545	37.84%	-1.44
Prog. Conservative	Clifford B. Clark	1,225	18.22%	+6.06
Total		6,725	100.00%	

1967 Saskatchewan general election: Shaunavon electoral district
Party	Candidate	Votes	%	±%
Liberal	Fernand Larochelle	3,091	53.52%	+9.58
NDP	Robert B. Fulton	2,684	46.48%	+8.64
Total		5,775	100.00%	

1971 Saskatchewan general election: Shaunavon electoral district
Party	Candidate	Votes	%	±%
NDP	Allan Oliver	3,127	52.12%	+5.64
Liberal	Fernand Larochelle	2,872	47.88%	-5.64
Total		5,999	100.00%	

1975 Saskatchewan general election: Shaunavon electoral district
Party	Candidate	Votes	%	±%
Liberal	Eiliv "Sonny" Anderson	3,370	45.92%	-1.96
NDP	Allan Oliver	2,593	35.34%	-16.78
Prog. Conservative	Eric Slater	1,375	18.74%	-
Total		7,338	100.00%	

1978 Saskatchewan general election: Shaunavon electoral district
Party	Candidate	Votes	%	±%
NDP	Dwain Lingenfelter	2,778	38.01%	+2.67
Liberal	Eiliv "Sonny" Anderson	2,385	32.64%	-13.28
Prog. Conservative	Jim Lacey	2,145	29.35%	+10.61
Total		7,308	100.00%	

1982 Saskatchewan general election: Shaunavon electoral district
Party	Candidate	Votes	%	±%
NDP	Dwain Lingenfelter	2,897	38.57%	+0.56
Progressive Conservative	John Bleackley	2,730	36.35%	+7.00
Western Canada Concept	Barry W. Dixon	1,139	15.16%	–
Liberal	Gratton Murray	745	9.92%	-22.72
Total		7,511	100.00%	

1986 Saskatchewan general election: Shaunavon electoral district
Party	Candidate	Votes	%	±%
Progressive Conservative	Ted Gleim	3,311	47.70%	+11.35
NDP	Dwain Lingenfelter	2,968	42.76%	+4.19
Liberal	Jules Larochelle	662	9.54%	-0.38
Total		6,941	100.00%	

1991 Saskatchewan general election: Shaunavon electoral district
Party	Candidate	Votes	%	±%
NDP	Glen McPherson	2,350	37.27%	-5.49
Prog. Conservative	Ted Gleim	2,222	35.24%	-12.46
Liberal	Jerry Ruehs	1,733	27.49%	+17.95
Total		6,305	100.00%	

== See also ==
- List of Saskatchewan provincial electoral districts
- List of Saskatchewan general elections
- Canadian provincial electoral districts
- Shaunavon, Saskatchewan
- Gull Lake, Saskatchewan
