= Wayne Elhard =

Canadian politician

Member of the Saskatchewan Legislative Assembly for Cypress Hills
- In office 28 June 1999 – 8 March 2016
- Preceded by: Jack Goohsen
- Succeeded by: Doug Steele

Personal details
- Born: 22 August 1947 (age 78) Rosthern, Saskatchewan, Canada
- Party: Saskatchewan Party

D. Wayne Elhard (born 22 August 1947) is a Canadian provincial politician. He served as the Saskatchewan Party member of the Legislative Assembly of Saskatchewan for the constituency of Cypress Hills. Elhard was the first MLA elected under the Saskatchewan Party banner, as he was elected in a June 1999 by election.
