= Harvey Harold McMahon =

Canadian politician

Harvey Harold McMahon (September 20, 1887 – November 17, 1959) was a merchant and political figure in Saskatchewan. He represented Gull Lake from 1939 to 1944 in the Legislative Assembly of Saskatchewan as a Liberal.

He was born in Millbrook, Ontario, the son of James Brown McMahon and Louise Cann, and was educated there. In 1920, he married a Miss Anderson. McMahon served six years on the town council for Shaunavon, Saskatchewan. He operated a general store in Shaunavon for 20 years.

McMahon was defeated when he ran for reelection to the provincial assembly in 1944. In 1947, he retired to Vancouver, British Columbia, where he later died at the age of 72.
