= Yogi Huyghebaert =

Canadian politician

Lieutenant Colonel Delwood Frederick Huyghebaert OMM CD

Member of the Saskatchewan Legislative Assembly for Wood River
- In office June 26, 2000 – March 8, 2016
- Preceded by: Glen McPherson
- Succeeded by: Dave Marit

Personal details
- Born: Delwood Frederick Huyghebaert; May 27, 1944 Lafleche, Saskatchewan, Canada
- Died: August 2, 2018 (aged 74) Glentworth, Saskatchewan, Canada
- Party: Saskatchewan Party
- Spouse: Phyllis
- Children: 2 sons

Delwood Frederick Huyghebaert, O.M.M., C.D. (Lt Colonel-Ret) (May 27, 1944 – August 2, 2018) was a Canadian politician, who served as a member of the Legislative Assembly of Saskatchewan from 2000 to 2016, representing the riding of Wood River as a member of the Saskatchewan Party.

Prior to his election to public office, he was a Fighter pilot in the Canadian Forces. His most notable duty was as captain of the Snowbirds Air Demonstration Team – 431 Squadron.

In 1986, he was made an Officer of the Order of Military Merit.

In 1997, he ran for the leadership of the fledgling Saskatchewan Party. He finished 3rd among three candidates. In 1995, he ran for the Progressive Conservative Party. In 1999, he narrowly lost election in the Wood River constituency as the Saskatchewan Party candidate. On election night, he tied Liberal candidate Glen McPherson. The returning officer cast the deciding vote in favour of McPherson. This result was later thrown out in court and a by-election was ordered. McPherson did not run and Huyghebaert then won a resounding victory. He was re-elected in 2003, 2007, and 2011.

On May 29, 2009, Huyghebaert was appointed to cabinet by Saskatchewan Premier Brad Wall in the role of minister of Corrections, Public Safety and Policing.

Huyghebaert retired from politics after the election. He died in 2018.

== Electoral record ==
2011 Saskatchewan general election: Wood River electoral district
Party	Candidate	Votes	%	±
Saskatchewan	D.F. (Yogi) Huyghebaert	5,354	82.03	+12.44
NDP	Randy Gaudry	961	14.72	-2.54
Green	Amelia Swiderski	212	3.25	+1.02
Total		6,527	100.00%	

2007 Saskatchewan general election: Wood River electoral district
Party	Candidate	Votes	%	±
Saskatchewan	D.F. (Yogi) Huyghebaert	5,325	69.59	+14.23
NDP	Steve Ryan	1,320	17.26	-8.61
Liberal	Michael Klein	768	10.04	-6.09
Green	Lynn Arrayel	171	2.23	-
Western Independence	Rocky Young	67	0.88	-1.76
Total		7,649	100.00%	

2003 Saskatchewan general election: Wood River electoral district
Party	Candidate	Votes	%	±
Saskatchewan	D.F. (Yogi) Huyghebaert	4,324	55.36	-9.73
NDP	Trevor Davies	2,021	25.87	+8.91
Liberal	Louis Stringer	1,260	16.13	+4.58
Western Independence	Nick Yorga	206	2.64	–
Total		7,811	100.00%	

2000 By-election: Wood River electoral district
Party	Candidate	Votes	%	±
Saskatchewan	D.F. (Yogi) Huyghebaert	4,384	65.09	+25.35
NDP	Robert Anderson	1,142	16.96	-3.55
Liberal	Jerry Ruehs	778	11.55	-28.20
New Green	Peter Borch	431	6.40	–
Total		6,735	100.00%	

1999 Saskatchewan general election: Wood River electoral district
Party	Candidate	Votes	%	±
Liberal	Glen McPherson	3,163	39.75	-8.27
Saskatchewan	D.F. (Yogi) Huyghebaert	3,162	39.74	–
NDP	Robert Anderson	1,632	20.51	-9.89
Total		7,957	100.00%	

1995 Saskatchewan general election: Wood River electoral district
Party	Candidate	Votes	%	±
Liberal	Glen McPherson	4,146	48.02	–
NDP	Allen Engel	2,624	30.40	–
Prog. Conservative	D.F. (Yogi) Huyghebaert	1,863	21.58	–
Total		8,633	100.00%	
