= Alexander John Colquhoun =

Canadian politician

Alexander John Colquhoun (1868 – February 5, 1951) was a farmer and political figure in Saskatchewan, Canada. He represented Maple Creek in the Legislative Assembly of Saskatchewan from 1917 to 1921 as a Liberal.

He was born in Colquhoun, Dundas County, Ontario, the son of Peter Duncan Colquhoun. In 1890, he married Rosamond Mitchell Johnson. Colquhoun lived in Maple Creek, Saskatchewan.
