= Maple Creek (federal electoral district) =

Former federal electoral district in Saskatchewan, Canada

Maple Creek was a federal electoral district in Saskatchewan, Canada, that was represented in the House of Commons of Canada from 1917 to 1953. This riding was created in 1914 from parts of Moose Jaw riding.

It was abolished in 1952 when it was redistributed into Swift Current riding.

== Election results ==
1917 Canadian federal election
Party	Candidate	Votes
Government (Unionist)	MAHARG, John Archibald	acclaimed

1921 Canadian federal election
Party	Candidate	Votes
Progressive	MCTAGGART, Neil Hamon	13,344
Conservative	WYLIE, David James	3,672

1925 Canadian federal election
Party	Candidate	Votes
Liberal	SPENCE, George	4,019
Conservative	SWANSTON, James Beck	3,253
Progressive	MCTAGGART, Neil Hamon	2,570

1926 Canadian federal election
Party	Candidate	Votes
Liberal	SPENCE, George	8,202
Conservative	SWANSTON, James Beck	5,772

By-election: On Mr. Spence's resignation, 14 October 1927

By-election on 25 November 1927
Party	Candidate	Votes
Liberal	BOCK, William George	acclaimed

1930 Canadian federal election
Party	Candidate	Votes
Conservative	SWANSTON, James Beck	7,772
Liberal	BOCK, William George	7,215
Farmer	HOLLIS, Annie L.	2,388

1935 Canadian federal election
Party	Candidate	Votes
Liberal	EVANS, Charles Robert	4,558
Co-operative Commonwealth	STADE, Armand Daniel	3,622
Conservative	SWANSTON, James Beck	3,597
Social Credit	JENSEN, Chris	3,167

1940 Canadian federal election
Party	Candidate	Votes
Liberal	EVANS, Charles Robert	5,157
Co-operative Commonwealth	KEMPER, Herman Henry	5,102
National Government	WRIGHT, Frederick Edwin	3,182

1945 Canadian federal election
Party	Candidate	Votes
Co-operative Commonwealth	MCCUAIG, Duncan John	6,483
Liberal	STUDER, Irvin William	4,084
Progressive Conservative	MCTAGGART, Neil	2,562
Social Credit	MILLER, Andrew John	1,721

1949 Canadian federal election
Party	Candidate	Votes
Liberal	STUDER, Irvin William	8,217
Co-operative Commonwealth	MCKAY, Eric Bowness	6,868
Progressive Conservative	CATON, William Edward	2,503

== See also ==
- List of Canadian electoral districts
- Historical federal electoral districts of Canada
