= Theodore Gleim =

Canadian politician

Theodore Robert "Ted" Gleim (July 31, 1933 – May 13, 2019) is a farmer, businessman and former political figure in Saskatchewan, Canada. He represented Shaunavon from 1986 to 1991 in the Legislative Assembly of Saskatchewan as a Progressive Conservative.

He was born in Chaplin, Saskatchewan, the son of George Gleim. Gleim served as mayor of Eastend. He was defeated by Glen McPherson when he ran for reelection to the Saskatchewan assembly in 1991.
