= George Spence (Canadian politician) =

Canadian politician

Member of the Canadian Parliament for Maple Creek
- In office 1925–1927
- Preceded by: Neil Haman McTaggart
- Succeeded by: William George Bock

Member of the Legislative Assembly of Saskatchewan
- In office 1917–1925
- In office 1927–1938

Personal details
- Born: October 25, 1880 Birsay, Orkney Islands, Scotland
- Died: March 4, 1975 (aged 94) Regina, Saskatchewan
- Party: Liberal
- Other political affiliations: Liberal Party of Saskatchewan
- Cabinet: Provincial: Minister of Railways; Minister of Highways; Minister of Railways, Labour and Industries; Minister of Agriculture; Minister of Public Works

George Spence, CBE (October 25, 1880 – March 4, 1975) was a Canadian provincial and federal politician.

Born in Birsay, Orkney Islands, Scotland, the son of Thomas Spence and Elizabeth Hunter, he studied electrical engineering at the Leith Academy Technical College and emigrated to Canada in 1900 to pan for gold in the Yukon. In 1903, he moved to Austin, Manitoba where he was a farmer. In 1912, he moved to Monchy, Saskatchewan. He was first elected to the Legislative Assembly of Saskatchewan in 1917 for the riding of Notukeu. A Liberal, he was re-elected in 1921 and 1925. He resigned his provincial seat in 1925 and was elected in the 1925 federal election in the riding of Maple Creek. A Liberal, he was re-elected in the 1926 federal election. He resigned his seat in 1927 to re-enter provincial politics, where he was appointed Minister of Railways. He was also Minister of Highways, Minister of Railways, Labour and Industries, Minister of Agriculture, and Minister of Public Works. He would serve until 1938 when he was appointed Director of the Prairie Farm Rehabilitation Administration. From 1947 to 1957, he was a member of the International Joint Commission, an independent binational organization established by the United States and Canada under the International Boundary Waters Treaty of 1909.

In 1919, Spence married Ivy Irene May. They had two daughters.

In 1946 he was made Commander of the Order of the British Empire and was awarded an Honorary Doctor of Law degree from the University of Saskatchewan in 1948. In 1974, he was inducted into the Saskatchewan Agricultural Hall of Fame.

He was the author of Survival of a Vision, published in 1967.

Spence died in Regina at the age of 94.
