= Fernand Larochelle =

Canadian politician, farmer, and business owner

Fernand Larochelle (1909 – January 5, 1978) was a farmer, business owner and political figure in Saskatchewan. He represented Shaunavon from 1964 to 1971 in the Legislative Assembly of Saskatchewan as a Liberal.

He was born in Black Lake, Quebec, later moved to Saskatchewan and was educated in Ponteix and in Gravelbourg. Larochelle farmed near Ponteix and also operated a garage and a trucking business. He served as government whip in the Saskatchewan assembly. Larochelle was a member of the town council for Ponteix, also serving as mayor, and was also a member of the Chamber of Commerce, of the Stock Growers Association, of the South-West Regional Hospital Council board of directors and of the local school board. He was defeated when he ran for reelection to the provincial assembly in 1971.
