= Charles Evans (politician) =

Canadian politician

Member of Parliament for Maple Creek
- In office October 1935 – April 1945

Personal details
- Born: Charles Robert Evans; 8 September 1882 Mount Forest, Ontario, Canada
- Died: 29 October 1947 (aged 65)
- Party: Liberal
- Spouse(s): Maynie E. Colbie m. 21 May 1913
- Profession: farmer, lumber merchant

Charles Robert Evans (8 September 1882 – 29 October 1947) was a Liberal party member of the House of Commons of Canada. He was born in Mount Forest, Ontario and became a farmer and lumber merchant.

He attended public and high schools in Mount Forest, and graduated from a two-year program at British American College.

Evans participated in municipal politics at Piapot, Saskatchewan as a school trustee and as a councillor.

He was first elected to Parliament at the Maple Creek riding in the 1935 general election and was re-elected for a second term in the 1940 election. After completing this term, Evans left federal politics and did not seek re-election in 1945.
