= Tompkins, Saskatchewan =

Tompkins
- Village
- Village of Tompkins
- Location within Gull Lake No. 139 Location within Saskatchewan
- Coordinates: 50.0625°N 108.7948°W
- Country: Canada
- Province: Saskatchewan

Population (2016)
  - Total: 152
- Time zone: UTC−06:00 (CST)
- Website: tompkins.ca

Tompkins (2016 population: 152) is a village in the Canadian province of Saskatchewan within the Rural Municipality of Gull Lake No. 139 and Census Division No. 8. The village is on the Trans-Canada Highway between the Town of Maple Creek and the City of Swift Current. The village was named for Thomas Tompkins, a CPR railroad contractor.

== History ==
Tompkins incorporated as a village on June 2, 1910.

== Demographics ==
Population history (1981–2016)
Year	Pop.	±%
1981	275	—
1986	286	+4.0%
1991	227	−20.6%
1996	201	−11.5%
2001	191	−5.0%
2006	173	−9.4%
2011	170	−1.7%
2016	152	−10.6%
Source: Statistics Canada via Saskatchewan Bureau of Statistics

In the 2021 Census of Population conducted by Statistics Canada, Tompkins had a population of 153 living in 84 of its 99 total private dwellings, a change of 0.7% from its 2016 population of 152. With a land area of 2.68 km^{2} (1.03 sq mi), it had a population density of 57.1/km^{2} (147.9/sq mi) in 2021.

In the 2016 Census of Population, the Village of Tompkins recorded a population of 152 living in 89 of its 104 total private dwellings, a −11.8% change from its 2011 population of 170. With a land area of 2.65 km^{2} (1.02 sq mi), it had a population density of 57.4/km^{2} (148.6/sq mi) in 2016.

== Economy ==
Tompkins has several small businesses which thrive on the local shopping and dedication which have always been an asset to the citizens of Tompkins.

== Popular culture ==
Tompkins' most famous celebrity was Gus Wickstrom who was known worldwide, and was featured on such programmes as the Daily Show, numerous Canada-wide TV shows, and various other USA TV and radio shows. He predicted the weather by looking at raw pig spleens for their colour, width, length and fatty deposits. From this, he predicted temperature, extreme heat/cold periods, snow/rainfall and drought up to eight months in advance. This is a famous practice dating back to his Scandinavian heritage. Gus died in 2007.

The popular Canadian sit-com Corner Gas pays tribute to both Gus Wickstrom and Tompkins in having the publisher/editor/writer of the local newspaper The Howler named Gus Tompkins. The character, though often talked about, is never seen.
