= Ramsland =

Ramsland is the surname of the following people

- Katherine Ramsland (born in 1953), American author and professor
- Martin Ramsland (born in 1993), Norwegian football player
- Max Ramsland (1882-1918), Canadian politician in Saskatchewan
- Ole Ramsland (1854-1930), American politician in Minnesota
- Sarah Ramsland (1882-1964), Canadian politician in Saskatchewan
