= Canora =

Canora may refer to:

- Canora (Edmonton), neighborhood of Edmonton, Alberta, Canada
- Canora, Saskatchewan, Canada
- Canora Beach, Canada
- Canora-Pelly, electoral district in Saskatchewan
- Canora (Ukraine), village in Ukraine

== Transportation ==
- Canora Airport, Canora, Saskatchewan, Canada
- Canora station, light metro rail station in Montreal, Quebec, Canada
- Canora station (Saskatchewan), Canora, Saskatchewan, Canada

== See also ==
- Kenora (disambiguation)
