= Albert Hermanson =

Canadian politician

Herman Peter Albert Hermanson (April 15, 1881 – December 2, 1960) was a Swedish-born Canadian farmer and provincial politician.

He was elected as the Liberal candidate to the Legislative Assembly of Saskatchewan for the riding of Canora in 1917 and 1921.

Hermanson was born in Håsjö, Jämtland, the son of Herman Hermanson, and moved to Minnesota, coming to what is now Saskatchewan in 1903 and settling on a homestead near Buchanan. The remainder of his family came to Saskatchewan from Sweden in 1904. In 1906, Hermanson became a member of the council for Local Improvement District #304 and, in 1907, became secretary-treasurer for the local school district. He married Ruby Harmer in 1909. In 1910, Hermanson left his farm and moved to Buchanan. He moved to Winnipeg, Manitoba in 1925 where he was manager of the Swedish American Line until 1936. From 1928 to 1954, he was Swedish consul for Manitoba, Saskatchewan and Alberta. In 1956, Hermanson and his wife moved to Dunnville, Ontario, where he died four years later at the age of 79.

Legislative Assembly of Saskatchewan
Preceded by John Duff Robertson (Liberal)	Member of the Legislative Assembly for Canora; 1917 - 1925	Succeeded by Joseph Albert McClure (Progressive)
