= Gordon Romuld =

Canadian politician

Member of the Legislative Assembly of Saskatchewan
- In office 1964–1967
- Preceded by: Alex Kuziak
- Succeeded by: Al Matsalla
- Constituency: Canora

Personal details
- Born: May 26, 1919 Tadmore, Saskatchewan
- Died: October 6, 1994 (aged 75) Preeceville, Saskatchewan
- Party: Saskatchewan Liberal Party
- Spouse: Margaret Cornish (m. 1947)

Kenneth Gordon Romuld (May 26, 1919 – October 6, 1994) was a Canadian politician. He served in the Legislative Assembly of Saskatchewan from 1964 to 1967 as member of the Liberal party.
