= Alex Kuziak =

Canadian politician

Member of the Legislative Assembly of Saskatchewan
- In office 1948–1964
- Preceded by: Myron Henry Feeley
- Succeeded by: Gordon Romuld
- Constituency: Canora

Personal details
- Born: October 15, 1908 Canora, Saskatchewan
- Died: May 14, 2010 (aged 101) Yorkton, Saskatchewan
- Party: Co-operative Commonwealth Federation
- Spouse: Ann Jarman (m. 1935)
- Occupation: educator, businessman

Alex Gordon Kuziak (October 15, 1908 – May 14, 2010) was an educator, businessman and politician of Ukrainian descent in Saskatchewan. He represented Canora from 1948 to 1964 in the Legislative Assembly of Saskatchewan as a Co-operative Commonwealth Federation (CCF) member.

== Early life and career ==
Kuziak was born in Canora, Saskatchewan, the son of Jacob Kuziak and Mary Luchuk, and was educated in Canora, Yorkton and Saskatoon. He attended normal school in Regina and then taught school in Canora for five years. Kuziak next served as secretary-treasurer for the rural municipality of Keys, operated an insurance and real estate business in Canora and was a partner in Canora Electric and Heating. He also was a member of the Canora school board, serving as chairman from 1945 to 1946, and was chairman of the Canora Union Hospital board.

== Political career ==
Kuziak was an active member of the Co-operative Commonwealth Federation since its inception in 1933. He was first elected as a member of the Legislative Assembly of Saskatchewan in the 1948 provincial election, representing the riding of Canora.

Following is re-election in the 1952, he was appointed Minister of Telephones, as Minister in charge of the Government Finance Office and as Minister of Natural Resources, becoming the first person of Ukrainian descent to become a cabinet minister in Canada. He was re-elected in the 1956 election and moved to the position of Minister of Mineral Resources, a position he held until his defeat in the 1964 election.

In the 1965 federal election, he ran unsuccessfully for the Yorkton seat in the Canadian House of Commons. He served on the city council for Yorkton in 1971.

== Personal life ==
In 1935, Kuziak married Ann Jarman.

He died in Yorkton in on May 14, 2010 at the age of 101.
