= Al Matsalla =

Canadian politician

MLA for Canora
- In office 1967–1982
- Preceded by: Ken Romuld
- Succeeded by: Lloyd Hampton

Personal details
- Born: Adolph Sylvester Matsalla; March 22, 1926 Buchanan, Saskatchewan
- Died: May 18, 2015 (aged 89) Saskatchewan, Canada
- Party: New Democratic
- Occupation: educator

Adolph Sylvester "Al" Matsalla (March 22, 1926 – May 18, 2015) was a Canadian educator, municipal administrator and political figure in Saskatchewan. He represented Canora from 1967 to 1982 in the Legislative Assembly of Saskatchewan as a New Democratic Party (NDP) member.

== Life and career ==
Matsalla was born in Buchanan, Saskatchewan, the son of Victor Anton Matsalla and Mary Balawyder, both natives of Poland, and grew up on a farm in the area. Matsalla was educated in Buchanan, in Yorkton, at the Saskatoon Teacher's College and at the University of Saskatchewan, where he completed a program in municipal administration. He taught school from 1943 to 1953 and then became secretary-treasurer for the rural municipality of Buchanan. In 1948, he married Anne Pura. Matsalla served in the provincial cabinet as Minister of Tourism and Renewable Resources. He retired from provincial politics in 1982. Matsalla next served as administrator for the rural municipality of Sliding Hills. From 1983 to 1987, he served on the town council for Canora.

In 1978, his cousin Joseph Matsalla ran unsuccessfully against him as a Liberal candidate for the Canora seat. Matsalla died on May 18, 2015.
