= Sarah Ramsland =

Canadian politician

MLA for Pelly
- In office 1918–1925
- Preceded by: Max Ramsland
- Succeeded by: Charles Tran

Personal details
- Born: Sarah Katherine McEwen; July 19, 1882 Boon Lake, Minnesota, US
- Died: April 4, 1964 (aged 81) Prince Albert, Saskatchewan, Canada
- Party: Liberal
- Spouse: Max Ramsland
- Relations: Charles D. McEwen, grandfather
- Occupation: homemaker

Sarah Katherine Ramsland, (née McEwen; July 19, 1882 – April 4, 1964) was a Canadian politician, the first woman ever elected to the Legislative Assembly of Saskatchewan.

She was born in Boon Lake, Minnesota, the daughter of local politician Bowman C. McEwen and the granddaughter of Minnesota Representative Charles D. McEwen. Trained as a schoolteacher, she married Max Ramsland, the son of Minnesota politician Ole Ramsland, in Buffalo Lake, Minnesota in 1906 and moved to Saskatchewan, settling first in Canora and later in Buchanan and Kamsack. Max Ramsland was elected to the Legislative Assembly in the 1917 provincial election as the Liberal MLA for Pelly, but died in 1918 in the Spanish flu epidemic, and Sarah Ramsland was elected to succeed him in the resulting byelection.

Early in her term she was invited by Premier William Melville Martin to second the formal motion to accept a Speech from the Throne, but declined the honour.

Ramsland was reelected in the 1921 election, and served until 1925. A backbench MLA, she rarely spoke in the legislature and was not prominent in the government until her final day in the legislature, when she introduced a resolution calling for an amendment to federal divorce laws that would permit women to apply for divorce on the grounds of a spouse's adultery, a privilege which was then only available to men.

She was defeated in the 1925 provincial election by Progressive candidate Charles Tran. She subsequently worked for the provincial library and for a number of women's organizations.

In 1942, she re-married, to Regina businessman William George Franklin Scythes.

She died in Prince Albert in 1964, at the age of 81 and is buried in the Regina Cemetery.
