= Sean Wilson (politician) =

Canadian politician (born 1979)

The Honourable Sean Wilson ECS MLA

Member of the Saskatchewan Legislative Assembly for Canora-Pelly
- Incumbent
- Assumed office October 28, 2024
- Preceded by: Terry Dennis

Personal details
- Born: 1979 (age 46–47)
- Party: Saskatchewan Party

Sean Wilson is a Canadian politician who was elected to the Legislative Assembly of Saskatchewan in the 2024 general election, representing Canora-Pelly as a member of the Saskatchewan Party.

Prior to his election, he was the mayor of Buchanan. He also served on the council of the Rural Municipality of Buchanan No. 304.

== Political career ==
On December 11, 2025, Wilson was named Saskatchewan’s Minister of SaskBuilds and Procurement.
