= Canora (provincial electoral district) =

Former provincial electoral district in Saskatchewan, Canada

Coordinates: 51°39′N 102°26′W

Canora is a former provincial electoral district for the Legislative Assembly of the province of Saskatchewan, Canada, centered on the town of Canora. This constituency was created before the 2nd Saskatchewan general election in 1908. Dissolved in 1934, the district was reconstituted before the 9th Saskatchewan general election in 1938.

It is now part of the constituency of Canora-Pelly.

== Members of the Legislative Assembly ==
=== 1908–1934 ===
#	MLA	Served	Party
1.	John Duff Robertson	1908–1917	Liberal
2.	H.P. Albert Hermanson	1917–1925	Liberal
3.	Joseph Albert McClure	1925–1929	Progressive
4.	Anton O. Morken	1929–1934	Liberal

=== 1938–1995 ===
#	MLA	Served	Party
1.	Myron Henry Feeley	1938–1948	CCF
2.	Alex G. Kuziak	1948–1964	CCF
3.	Ken Romuld	1964–1967	Liberal
4.	Al Matsalla	1967–1982	New Democrat
5.	Lloyd Hampton	1982–1985	Progressive Conservative
6.	Lloyd Hampton	1986	Western Canada Concept
7.	Lorne Kopelchuk	1986–1991	Progressive Conservative
8.	Darrel Cunningham	1991–1995	New Democrat

== Election results ==
1908 Saskatchewan general election: Canora electoral district
Party	Candidate	Votes	%	±%
Liberal	John Duff Robertson	459	69.02%	–
Provincial Rights	William Johnston	206	30.98%	–
Total		665	100.00%	

1912 Saskatchewan general election: Canora electoral district
Party	Candidate	Votes	%	±%
Liberal	John Duff Robertson	683	59.24%	-9.78
Conservative	William McGregor	368	31.92%	+0.94
Independent	Mike Gabora	102	8.84%	–
Total		1,153	100.00%	

1917 Saskatchewan general election: Canora electoral district
Party	Candidate	Votes	%	±%
Liberal	H.P. Albert Hermanson	2,261	80.06%	+20.82
Conservative	William James Fennell	499	17.67%	-14.25
Independent	Richard Mitchell	64	2.27%	-6.57
Total		2,824	100.00%	

1921 Saskatchewan general election: Canora electoral district
Party	Candidate	Votes	%	±%
Liberal	H.P. Albert Hermanson	1,597	43.55%	-36.51
Independent Nonpartisan League	John Shabbits	1,400	38.18%	–
Independent	Bohdan Michael Sawiak	670	18.27%	+16.00
Total		3,667	100.00%	

1925 Saskatchewan general election: Canora electoral district
Party	Candidate	Votes	%	±%
Progressive	Joseph Albert McClure	1,993	62.50%	+24.32
Liberal	William Paterson	1,196	37.50%	-6.05
Total		3,189	100.00%	

1929 Saskatchewan general election: Canora electoral district
Party	Candidate	Votes	%	±%
Liberal	Anton O. Morken	2,294	54.58%	+17.08
Progressive	Adam Cymbalisty	1,097	26.10%	-8.54
Progressive	Alex N. Bilous	812	19.32%	-8.54
Total		4,203	100.00%	

1938 Saskatchewan general election: Canora electoral district
Party	Candidate	Votes	%	±%
CCF	Myron Henry Feeley	3,504	51.81%	–
Liberal	George Ernest Dragan	3,259	48.19%	-
Total		6,763	100.00%	

1944 Saskatchewan general election: Canora electoral district
Party	Candidate	Votes	%	±%
CCF	Myron Henry Feeley	3,538	58.24%	+6.43
Liberal	Stephen T. Shabbits	2,537	41.76%	-6.43
Total		6,075	100.00%	

1948 Saskatchewan general election: Canora electoral district
Party	Candidate	Votes	%	±%
CCF	Alex G. Kuziak	3,104	42.18%	-16.06
Liberal	Stephen T. Shabbits	2,453	33.34%	-8.42
Social Credit	Stanley W. Gorchynski	1,801	24.48%	–
Total		7,358	100.00%	

1952 Saskatchewan general election: Canora electoral district
Party	Candidate	Votes	%	±%
CCF	Alex G. Kuziak	4,141	53.57%	+11.39
Liberal	Stephen T. Shabbits	3,589	46.43%	+13.09
Total		7,730	100.00%	

1956 Saskatchewan general election: Canora electoral district
Party	Candidate	Votes	%	±%
CCF	Alex G. Kuziak	3,713	47.93%	-5.64
Liberal	John J. Plaxin	3,469	44.78%	-1.65
Social Credit	Harold Fenske	565	7.29%	-
Total		7,747	100.00%	

1960 Saskatchewan general election: Canora electoral district
Party	Candidate	Votes	%	±%
CCF	Alex G. Kuziak	2,919	40.66%	-7.27
Liberal	Ken Romuld	2,259	31.47%	-13.31
Prog. Conservative	Lawrence N. Gray	1,816	25.29%	-
Social Credit	Joseph W. Hungle	185	2.58%	-4.71
Total		7,179	100.00%	

1964 Saskatchewan general election: Canora electoral district
Party	Candidate	Votes	%	±%
Liberal	Ken Romuld	3,391	50.32%	+18.85
CCF	Alex G. Kuziak	3,348	49.68%	+9.02
Total		6,739	100.00%	

1967 Saskatchewan general election: Canora electoral district
Party	Candidate	Votes	%	±%
NDP	Al Matsalla	3,386	51.65%	+1.97
Liberal	Ken Romuld	3,170	48.35%	-1.97
Total		6,556	100.00%	

1971 Saskatchewan general election: Canora electoral district
Party	Candidate	Votes	%	±%
NDP	Al Matsalla	4,135	60.02%	+8.37
Liberal	Stan Kyba	2,754	39.98%	-8.37
Total		6,889	100.00%	

1975 Saskatchewan general election: Canora electoral district
Party	Candidate	Votes	%	±%
NDP	Al Matsalla	4,024	50.36%	-9.66
Liberal	Marie Kotelko	2,310	28.91%	-11.07
Prog. Conservative	Michael Kaminski	1,656	20.73%	-
Total		7,990	100.00%	

1978 Saskatchewan general election: Canora electoral district
Party	Candidate	Votes	%	±%
NDP	Al Matsalla	4,258	55.77%	+5.41
Prog. Conservative	Eugene Teslia	2,647	34.67%	+13.94
Liberal	Joseph Matsalla	730	9.56%	-19.35
Total		7,635	100.00%	

1982 Saskatchewan general election: Canora electoral district
Party	Candidate	Votes	%	±%
Progressive Conservative	Lloyd Hampton	4,398	53.44%	+18.77
NDP	Gerard Pikula	3,520	42.77%	-13.00
Liberal	Michael Okrainetz	312	3.79%	-5.77
Total		8,230	100.00%	

1986 Saskatchewan general election: Canora electoral district
Party	Candidate	Votes	%	±%
Progressive Conservative	Lorne Kopelchuk	4,273	54.65%	+1.21
NDP	Linda Kezima	3,271	41.83%	-0.94
Liberal	Carole Merriman	275	3.52%	-0.27
Total		7,819	100.00%	

1991 Saskatchewan general election: Canora electoral district
Party	Candidate	Votes	%	±%
NDP	Darrel Cunningham	3,564	49.91%	+8.08
Prog. Conservative	Lorne Kopelchuk	2,746	38.45%	-16.20
Liberal	Roy Petrowicz	831	11.64%	+8.12
Total		7,141	100.00%	

== See also ==
- List of Saskatchewan provincial electoral districts
- List of Saskatchewan general elections
- Canadian provincial electoral districts
