= Lorne Kopelchuk =

Canadian politician

Lorne Allan Kopelchuk (b. August 4, 1938) is a farmer and former political figure in Saskatchewan. He represented Canora from 1986 to 1991 in the Legislative Assembly of Saskatchewan as a Progressive Conservative.

He was born in Canora, Saskatchewan, the son of Steven Kopelchuk and Susan Procyshen, and studied commerce at the University of Saskatchewan. He farmed and worked as an office worker before entering politics. In 1961, he married Doris Samuels. Kopelchuk served in the Saskatchewan cabinet as Minister of Parks and Renewable Resources and as Minister of Northern Affairs. He was defeated by Darrel Cunningham when he ran for reelection to the assembly in 1991.

As part of an investigation into fraudulent use of communications allowances by Progressive Conservative members of the Saskatchewan legislature, Kopelchuk was charged with using a false expense claim to pay $1,568 for an electronic public address system. This expense could have legitimately been claimed against his constituency office allowance. In addition, the actual cost of the system was $1,005; the balance went to John Scraba, communications director for the Saskatchewan Progressive Conservative party. The PA system and podium were donated to the Town of Canora prior to the charges. The judge acquitted him, deciding that there was no evidence that Kopelchuk was aware of the misleading invoice.

As of 2026, Kopelchuk remains in Canora with his wife of 64 years. They have 4 daughters, 12 grandchildren, and 2 great-grandchildren.
