= Max Ramsland =

Canadian politician

MLA for Pelly
- In office 1917–1918
- Preceded by: John K. Johnston
- Succeeded by: Sarah Ramsland

Personal details
- Born: January 30, 1882 Sacred Heart, Minnesota, US
- Died: November 17, 1918 (aged 36)
- Party: Liberal

Magnus (Max) Ramsland (January 30, 1882 – November 17, 1918) was a Canadian politician. He was elected to the Legislative Assembly of Saskatchewan in the 1917 provincial election as the Liberal MLA for Pelly, but died of the Spanish flu in 1918 after less than a year in office.

Born in Sacred Heart, Minnesota to merchant and politician Ole Ramsland, he moved to Canora, Saskatchewan in 1903. In 1906, Ramsland married Sarah McEwen, the granddaughter of Minnesota politician Charles D. McEwen, in Buffalo Lake, Minnesota. He helped found the town of Buchanan before the Ramslands settled at their final home in Kamsack.

In the by-election held following his death, he was succeeded by his widow Sarah, who became the first woman ever elected to the Saskatchewan legislature.
