= Ron Harper (politician) =

Canadian politician (born 1948)

Assembly Member for MLA for Regina Northeast
- In office September 16, 1999 – October 10, 2011
- Preceded by: Edward Shillington
- Succeeded by: Kevin Doherty

Member of the Saskatchewan Legislative Assembly for Pelly
- In office October 21, 1991 – May 23, 1995
- Preceded by: Rod Gardner
- Succeeded by: Riding Dissolved

Personal details
- Born: January 21, 1948 (age 78) Preeceville, Saskatchewan
- Party: New Democratic Party

Ronald Lee Harper is a Canadian provincial politician. He served as the Saskatchewan New Democratic Party member of the Legislative Assembly of Saskatchewan for the constituency of Regina Northeast. He was first elected in 1991 in the constituency of Pelly, but narrowly defeated in 1995 in the new constituency of Canora-Pelly. He returned to the Legislature in 1999 when he won the constituency of Regina Northeast and was re-elected in 2003 and 2007.
