= Crystal Lake (Saskatchewan) =

Lake in Saskatchewan, Canada

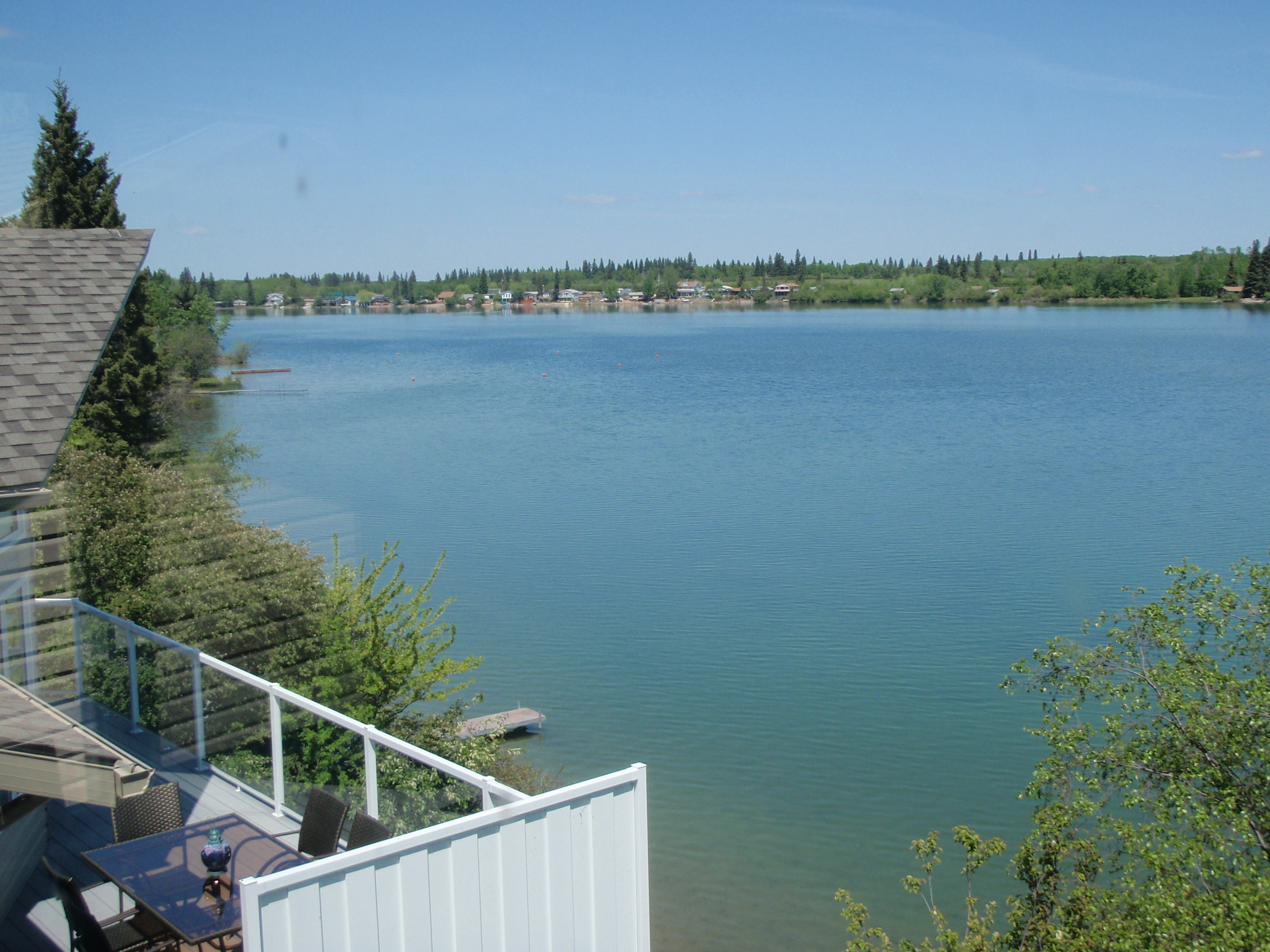
- View of Crystal Lake

- Location in Saskatchewan Crystal Lake (Canada)
- Location: East central Saskatchewan
- Coordinates: 51°51′N 102°26′W
- Part of: Red River drainage basin
- Primary inflows: Underground springs
- Basin countries: Canada
- Max. length: 3.2 km (2.0 mi)
- Max. width: 1.6 km (0.99 mi)
- Website: Official website

Crystal Lake is a lake straddling the boundary between the rural municipalities of Keys No. 303 and Buchanan No. 304 in eastern Saskatchewan, Canada. At 1.6 kilometres (0.99 mi) wide and 3.2 kilometres (2.0 mi) long, it is a small lake fed by natural underground springs. It is surrounded by the residential resort community of Crystal Lake. The lake is approximately 24 kilometres (15 mi) north of Canora and 24 kilometres (15 mi) south-east of Preeceville.

== See also ==
- List of lakes of Saskatchewan
