= Ole Ramsland =

American politician

Ole T. Ramsland

Member of the Minnesota House of Representatives for District 22
- In office January 3, 1905 – January 7, 1907
- Preceded by: Andrew H. Anderson
- Succeeded by: John Alton Dalzell

Personal details
- Born: 6 October 1854 Hellelands, Sogn, Norway
- Died: January 2, 1930 (aged 75)
- Resting place: Sacred Heart, Minnesota
- Party: Democrat
- Occupation: merchant

Ole T. Ramsland (1854–1930) was an American politician, who served in the Minnesota House of Representatives from 1905 to 1907. A Democrat, he represented District 22.

A resident of Sacred Heart, where he owned a general store, Ramsland also served on the local school board and the village council. He married Julia A. Thompson (1861–1896) and, after Julia's early death, Inger Leonora Arestad (1870–1947), both fellow Norwegians.

His son Magnus married Sarah McEwen, the granddaughter of Minnesota state representative Charles D. McEwen, in 1906. The couple later moved to the Canadian province of Saskatchewan, where they were among the founding settlers of the village of Buchanan and both later served in the Legislative Assembly of Saskatchewan.
