= Dan Daniels =

Dan Daniels may refer to:

- Dan Daniels (sportscaster) (1922–2012), American sportscaster
- Dan Daniels (politician) (1908–1991), Canadian politician
- Danny Daniels (1924–2017), American choreographer

== See also ==
- Dan Daniel (disambiguation)
- Daniel Danielis (1635–1696), Belgian composer
