= Crystal Lake, Saskatchewan =

Community in Saskatchewan, Canada

Crystal Lake
- Organized hamlet
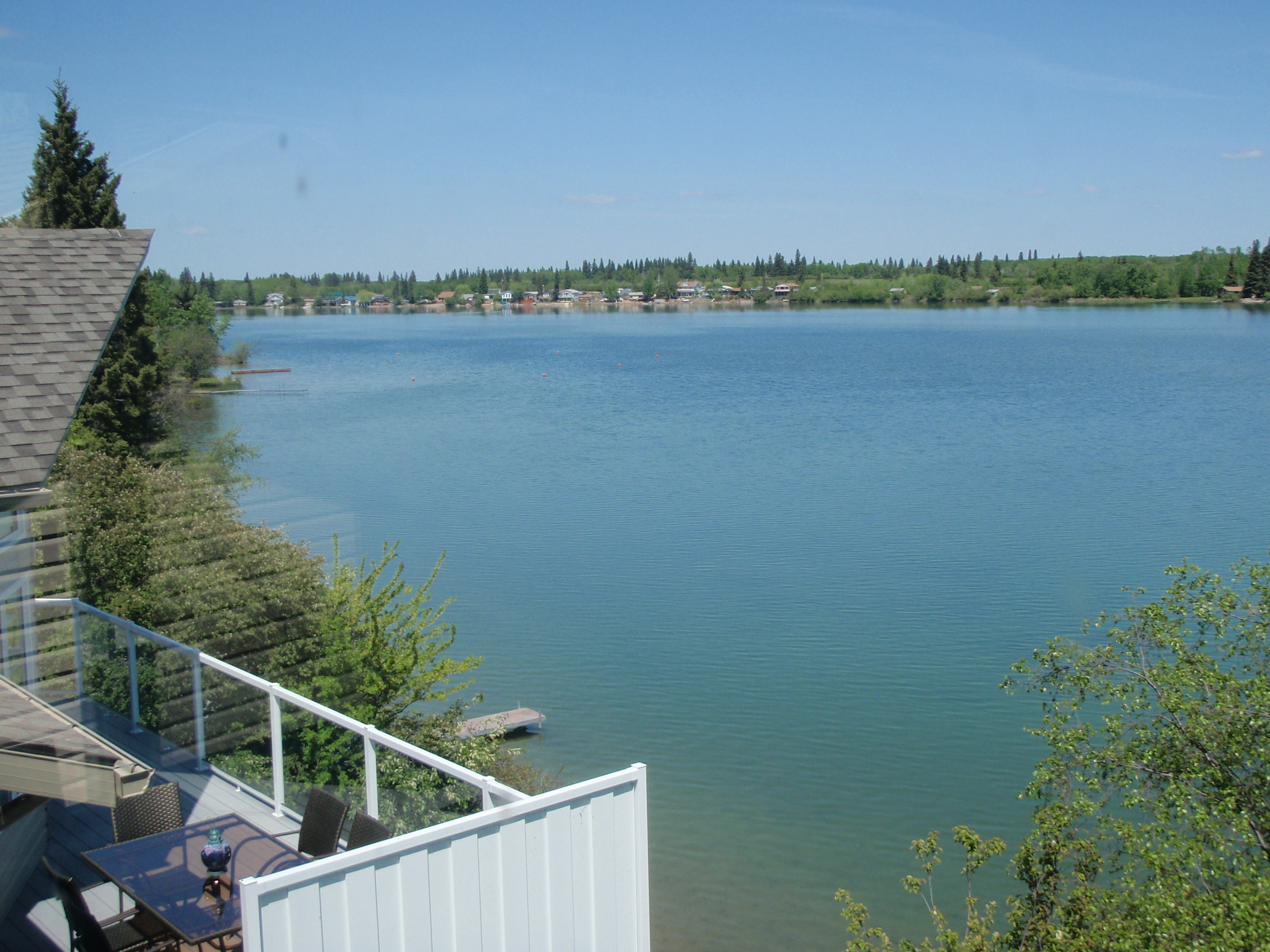
- View of Crystal Lake

- Location of Crystal Lake in Saskatchewan Crystal Lake (Canada)
- Coordinates: 51.852°N 102.424°W
- Country: Canada
- Province: Saskatchewan
- Census division: 9
- Rural municipality (RM): Keys No. 303

Government
  - Governing body: RM of Keys No. 303

Area (2016)
  - Total: 0.74 km^{2} (0.29 sq mi)

Population (2016)
  - Total: 61
  - Density: 82/km^{2} (210/sq mi)
- Time zone: CST
- Area code: 306
- Highways: Highway 9
- Waterways: Crystal Lake
- Website: Official website

Crystal Lake (2016 population: 61) is an organized hamlet within the Rural Municipality of Keys No. 303 in the Canadian province of Saskatchewan. It is also recognized as part of a designated place by Statistics Canada. The organized hamlet (Crystal Lake part A) is on the majority of the shores of Crystal Lake, 1.0 kilometre (0.62 mi) west of Highway 9 and approximately 70 kilometres (43 mi) north of the city of Yorkton. The second part of the designated place (Crystal Lake part B) is on the balance of the shores of Crystal Lake within the adjacent RM of Buchanan No. 304.

== Demographics ==
=== Organized Hamlet of Crystal Lake (Crystal Lake part A) ===
In the 2021 Census of Population conducted by Statistics Canada, Crystal Lake part A had a population of 115 living in 54 of its 142 total private dwellings, a change of 88.5% from its 2016 population of 61. With a land area of 0.8 km^{2} (0.31 sq mi), it had a population density of 143.8/km^{2} (372.3/sq mi) in 2021.

=== Crystal Lake part B ===
Also in the 2021 Census of Population, Crystal Lake part B had a population of 56 living in 24 of its 82 total private dwellings, a change of 80.6% from its 2016 population of 31. With a land area of 0.42 km^{2} (0.16 sq mi), it had a population density of 133.3/km^{2} (345.3/sq mi) in 2021.

== See also ==
- List of communities in Saskatchewan
