= Rod Gardner (politician) =

Canadian politician

MLA for Pelly
- In office 1986–1991
- Preceded by: Norm Lusney
- Succeeded by: Ron Harper

Personal details
- Born: 1948 (age 77–78) Kelvington, Saskatchewan
- Party: Progressive Conservative
- Occupation: Farmer, Business Owner

Roderick Ivan Gardner (born 1948) is a former political figure in Saskatchewan. He represented Pelly in the Legislative Assembly of Saskatchewan from 1986 to 1991 as a Progressive Conservative. He later served as Mayor for Kamsack, Saskatchewan from 2012 to 2016.
