= John Kenneth Johnston =

Canadian politician

MLA for Pelly
- In office 1908–1917
- Preceded by: first member
- Succeeded by: Max Ramsland

Personal details
- Born: June 28, 1865 Aldborough Township, Canada West
- Died: May 1945 (aged 79)
- Party: Liberal
- Occupation: lawyer

John Kenneth Johnston (June 28, 1865 – May 1945) was a lawyer, farmer and political figure in Saskatchewan. He represented Pelly in the Legislative Assembly of Saskatchewan from 1908 to 1917 as a Liberal.

He was born in Crinan, Aldborough Township, Elgin County, Canada West, the son of Duncan M. Johnston and Harriet Urquart, and was educated at Queen's University. Johnston taught school in Smiths Falls, Ontario, came west in 1900 and then was principal for a high school in Calgary, Alberta. He later settled in Kamsack, Saskatchewan. Johnston established law offices in Kamsack and Canora. He ran unsuccessfully for election to the provincial assembly as an independent in 1929. Johnston died at home in Kamsack at the age of 79.
