= Myron Henry Feeley =

Canadian politician

MLA for Canora
- In office 1938–1948
- Preceded by: riding reconstituted
- Succeeded by: Alex Kuziak

Personal details
- Born: February 18, 1885 Belvidere, Illinois
- Died: August 22, 1976 (aged 91)
- Party: Co-operative Commonwealth Federation
- Spouse(s): Norma Buchecker; Mary Tremback
- Profession: farmer

Myron Henry Feeley (February 18, 1885 – August 22, 1976) was an American-born farmer and political figure in Saskatchewan. He represented Canora from 1938 to 1948 in the Legislative Assembly of Saskatchewan as a Co-operative Commonwealth Federation (CCF) member.

He was born in Belvidere, Illinois, the son of James C. Feeley and Florence Avery, and was educated in Mason City, Iowa. Feeley came to Canada in 1903, settling on a homestead near Preeceville, Saskatchewan. He served on the local committee of the Saskatchewan Wheat Pool and on the local school board. In 1921, Feeley married Norma Buchecker. He married Mary "Moll" Tremback in 1936 after his first wife died of meningitis.
