= Kenora (disambiguation) =

Kenora is a city in Ontario, Canada.

Kenora may also refer to:

- Kenora (federal electoral district)
- Kenora (provincial electoral district)
- Kenora District, a territorial district in Ontario

== See also ==
- Canora (disambiguation)
