= Alpha Sunde Smaby =

American politician and teacher

- Born: Alpha Mathilda Sunde; February 11, 1910; Sacred Heart, Minnesota, U.S.
- Died: July 18, 1991 (aged 81); Saint Paul, Minnesota, U.S.
- Occupations: Educator, politician
- Term: Minnesota House of Representatives (1965-1969)

Alpha Mathilda Sunde Smaby (February 11, 1910 – July 18, 1991) was an American politician and teacher. She represented Hennepin County for two terms in the Minnesota House of Representatives, in office from 1965 to 1969, and was the third woman elected to the Minnesota legislature. She was listed as Eugene McCarthy's vice-presidential running mate in 1988, as the Minnesota Progressive Party's ticket.

== Early life and education ==
Sunde was born in Sacred Heart, Minnesota, and raised in Peterson, Minnesota, the daughter of Alfred T. Sunde and Mathilda D. Hovde Sunde. Her father ran a creamery. She graduated from the University of Minnesota and Winona State University. In the 1980s she earned a master's degree in history.

== Career ==
Smaby taught school and worked for Cargill before she married in 1939. Smaby was the third woman elected to the Minnesota legislature, when she served in the Minnesota House of Representatives for two terms from 1965 until 1969 and was a Democrat. In 1967 she helped organize the Minnesota Concerned Democrats, an anti-Vietnam War faction. During the 1968 United States presidential election, Smaby was a delegate to the Democratic Party Convention and supported United States Senator Eugene McCarthy.

Smaby ran for Minneapolis City Council in 1969. In 1973, she sought a consumer representative seat on the Northern States Power Company board of directors. She published a book, Political Upheaval: Minnesota and the Vietnam War Protest (1987), based on oral history interviews she conducted for her master's thesis. She was McCarthy's vice-presidential running mate in Minnesota in 1988, representing the Minnesota Progressive Party. She and McCarthy received 5,403 votes.

== Personal life and legacy ==
Sunde married Arthur Jonathan Smaby in 1939. They had three daughters. Her husband died in 1972, and she died from cancer in 1991, in Saint Paul, Minnesota. David Durenburger read a tribute to Smaby on the floor of the United States Senate in July 1991, in tribute. Her research files are in the collection of the Minnesota Historical Society. Her granddaughter Kate Nowlin is an actress.
