= Norm Lusney =

Canadian politician

Norman Lusney

MLA for Pelly
- In office 1977–1986
- Preceded by: Leonard Larson
- Succeeded by: Rod Gardner

Personal details
- Born: February 10, 1937 Kamsack, Saskatchewan
- Died: December 10, 2007 (aged 70)
- Party: New Democrat

Norman Lusney (February 10, 1937 – December 10, 2007) was a political figure in Saskatchewan. He represented Pelly from 1977 to 1986 in the Legislative Assembly of Saskatchewan as a New Democratic Party (NDP) member.

He was born in Kamsack, Saskatchewan and grew up on the family farm. In 1958, he married Loretta Horkoff. Lusney worked in mining in British Columbia, on the railroad in Ontario, in the dairy industry in Moose Jaw and with the Post Office in Roblin, Manitoba. He also operated a service station and worked the family farm. Lusney was first elected to the Saskatchewan assembly in a 1977 by-election held following the death of Leonard Larson. He was defeated by Rod Gardner when he ran for reelection to the assembly in 1986. He died in 2007.
