= Reginald John Marsden Parker =

Canadian politician

The Honourable Reginald John Marsden Parker
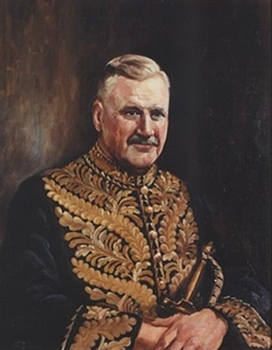
- Reginald John Marsden Parker during his time as Lieutenant Governor of Saskatchewan.

8th Lieutenant Governor of Saskatchewan
- In office June 22, 1945 – March 23, 1948
- Monarch: George V
- Governors General: The Earl of Athlone; The Viscount Alexander of Tunis
- Premier: Tommy Douglas
- Preceded by: Thomas Miller
- Succeeded by: John Uhrich

MLA for Pelly
- In office June 6, 1929 – June 15, 1944
- Preceded by: Charles Tran
- Succeeded by: Dan Daniels

Personal details
- Born: February 7, 1881 Cornwall, England
- Died: March 23, 1948 (aged 67)
- Party: Liberal

Reginald John Marsden Parker (February 7, 1881 – March 23, 1948) was the eighth lieutenant governor of Saskatchewan from 1945 until his death in 1948.

Parker was born in Cornwall, England, United Kingdom, the son of Josiah William Parker, and emigrated to Canada in 1898. He worked as a farmhand before establishing a homestead in Togo in what is now Saskatchewan.

He got involved with local politics and was elected councilor in the rural municipality of Cote in 1904. He served as reeve from 1906 to 1932.

In 1904, Parker married Cecilie Margaret Mapleton.

In the 1929 Saskatchewan provincial election, Parker was elected to the Legislative Assembly of Saskatchewan as the Liberal MLA for Pelly and sat on the opposition bench.

He was re-elected in the 1934 provincial election in which the Liberals took power. Parker was appointed to the provincial cabinet of James Garfield Gardiner as Minister of Municipal Affairs. He served in the portfolio for ten years until the Saskatchewan CCF took power in the 1944 provincial election.

Parker was appointed lieutenant governor of the province by federal Prime Minister William Lyon Mackenzie King and was sworn in on June 25, 1945. He served until his death almost three years later.
