= Pelly (Saskatchewan electoral district) =

Former provincial electoral district in Saskatchewan, Canada

Coordinates: 51°40′N 101°50′W

Pelly is a former provincial electoral district for the Legislative Assembly of the province of Saskatchewan, Canada. Located in east-central Saskatchewan, it was centred on the village of Pelly. The riding was created before the 2nd Saskatchewan general election in 1908, and dissolved before the 23rd Saskatchewan general election in 1995. This constituency elected the first woman to the Saskatchewan legislature: Sarah Ramsland.

It is now part of the district of Canora-Pelly.

== Members of the Legislative Assembly ==
#	MLA	Served	Party
1.	John Kenneth Johnston	1908 – 1917	Liberal
2.	Magnus O. Ramsland	1917 – 1918^{1}	Liberal
3.	Sarah Katherine Ramsland	1919 – 1925	Liberal
4.	Charles Tran	1925 – 1929	Progressive
5.	Reginald J.M. Parker	1929 – 1944	Liberal
6.	Dan Daniels	1944 – 1948	CCF
7.	John Banks	1948 – 1952	Liberal
8.	Arnold Feusi	1952 – 1956	CCF
9.	Jim Barrie	1956 – 1964	Liberal
10.	Leonard Larson	1964 – 1967	CCF
11.	Jim Barrie	1967 – 1971	Liberal
12.	Leonard Larson	1971 – 1977	New Democrat
13.	Norm Lusney	June 1977 – 1986	New Democrat
14.	Rod Gardner	1986 – 1991	Progressive Conservative
15.	Ron Harper	1991 – 1995	New Democrat

=== Notes ===
^{1} Magnus Ramsland died as a result of the worldwide influenza pandemic of 1918. In the 1919 Pelly by-election, he was succeeded by his widow Sarah Ramsland, the first woman ever elected to the Legislative Assembly of Saskatchewan.

== Election results ==
1908 Saskatchewan general election: Pelly electoral district
Party	Candidate	Votes	%	±%
Liberal	John Kenneth Johnston	363	52.31%	–
Provincial Rights	Richard Serle Dundas	331	47.69%	–
Total		694	100.00%	

1912 Saskatchewan general election: Pelly electoral district
Party	Candidate	Votes	%	±%
Liberal	John Kenneth Johnston	685	50.18%	-2.13
Conservative	E.J. Johnson	680	49.82%	+2.13
Total		1,365	100.00%	

1917 Saskatchewan general election: Pelly electoral district
Party	Candidate	Votes	%	±%
Liberal	Magnus O. Ramsland	2,402	63.39%	+13.21
Conservative	Reginald J.M. Parker	1,387	36.61%	-13.21
Total		3,789	100.00%	

July 29, 1919 By-Election: Pelly electoral district
Party	Candidate	Votes	%	±%
Liberal	Sarah Katherine Ramsland	1,703	54.29%	-9.10
Independent	Walter William Whelan	1,434	45.71%	–
Total		3,137	100.00%	

1921 Saskatchewan general election: Pelly electoral district
Party	Candidate	Votes	%	±%
Liberal	Sarah Katherine Ramsland	1,457	33.64%	-20.65
Nonpartisan League	George Faulds Stirling	1,038	23.97%	–
Independent	Harry W. Slipchenko	925	21.36%	–
Independent Conservative	Charles Tran	911	21.03%	–
Total		4,331	100.00%	

1925 Saskatchewan general election: Pelly electoral district
Party	Candidate	Votes	%	±%
Progressive	Charles Tran	1,946	53.58%	+29.61
Liberal	Sarah Katherine Ramsland	1,686	46.42%	+12.78
Total		3,632	100.00%	

1929 Saskatchewan general election: Pelly electoral district
Party	Candidate	Votes	%	±%
Liberal	Reginald J.M. Parker	3,086	71.43%	+25.01
Independent	John Kenneth Johnston	1,234	28.57%	-
Total		4,320	100.00%	

1934 Saskatchewan general election: Pelly electoral district
Party	Candidate	Votes	%	±%
Liberal	Reginald J.M. Parker	4,835	57.78%	-13.65
Farmer-Labour	Andrew Danyleyko	1,639	19.59%	–
Conservative	Frederick G. Garvin	1,426	17.04%	-
United Front	Walter Ernest Wiggins	468	5.59%	–
Total		8,368	100.00%	

1938 Saskatchewan general election: Pelly electoral district
Party	Candidate	Votes	%	±%
Liberal	Reginald J.M. Parker	3,936	56.04%	-1.74
CCF	Gertrude S. Telford	3,088	43.96%	+24.37
Total		7,024	100.00%	

1944 Saskatchewan general election: Pelly electoral district
Party	Candidate	Votes	%	±%
CCF	Dan Daniels	3,273	51.37%	+7.41
Liberal	Reginald J.M. Parker	2,544	39.93%	-16.11
Labor–Progressive	William M. Berezowski	554	8.70%	-
Total		6,371	100.00%	

1948 Saskatchewan general election: Pelly electoral district
Party	Candidate	Votes	%	±%
Liberal	John Banks	2,646	35.55%	-4.38
CCF	Dan Daniels	2,476	33.27%	-18.10
Labor–Progressive	William M. Berezowski	1,301	17.48%	+8.78
Social Credit	John W. Kowalyshen	1,020	13.70%	–
Total		7,443	100.00%	

1952 Saskatchewan general election: Pelly electoral district
Party	Candidate	Votes	%	±%
CCF	Arnold Feusi	3,286	49.90%	+16.63
Liberal	John Banks	2,727	41.41%	+5.86
Labor–Progressive	William M. Berezowski	572	8.69%	-8.79
Total		6,585	100.00%	

1956 Saskatchewan general election: Pelly electoral district
Party	Candidate	Votes	%	±%
Liberal	Jim Barrie	3,568	49.52%	+8.11
CCF	Arnold Feusi	3,069	42.60%	-7.30
Social Credit	William A. Horocholyn	568	7.88%	-
Total		7,205	100.00%	

1960 Saskatchewan general election: Pelly electoral district
Party	Candidate	Votes	%	±%
Liberal	Jim Barrie	3,455	49.59%	+0.07
CCF	Peter J. Wlasichuk	2,921	41.93%	-0.67
Social Credit	George Johnson	304	4.36%	-3.52
Prog. Conservative	Gordon C. Peters	287	4.12%	-
Total		6,967	100.00%	

1964 Saskatchewan general election: Pelly electoral district
Party	Candidate	Votes	%	±%
CCF	Leonard Larson	2,705	41.07%	-0.86
Liberal	Jim Barrie	2,669	40.53%	-9.06
Prog. Conservative	Bohdan E. Lozinsky	1,212	18.40%	+14.28
Total		6,586	100.00%	

1967 Saskatchewan general election: Pelly electoral district
Party	Candidate	Votes	%	±%
Liberal	Jim Barrie	3,002	52.16%	+11.63
NDP	Leonard Larson	2,753	47.84%	+6.77
Total		5,755	100.00%	

1971 Saskatchewan general election: Pelly electoral district
Party	Candidate	Votes	%	±%
NDP	Leonard Larson	2,905	56.08%	+8.24
Liberal	Jim Barrie	2,275	43.92%	-8.24
Total		5,180	100.00%	

1975 Saskatchewan general election: Pelly electoral district
Party	Candidate	Votes	%	±%
NDP	Leonard Larson	3,511	50.26%	-5.82
Liberal	Peter E. McDonald	2,250	32.21%	-11.71
Progressive Conservative	W.J. Ferniuk	1,150	16.46%	-
Independent	George G. Shlakoff	75	1.07%	-
Total		6,986	100.00%	

June 8, 1977 By-Election: Pelly electoral district
Party	Candidate	Votes	%	±%
NDP	Norm Lusney	3,724	48.29%	-1.97
Progressive Conservative	Barrie Johnson	2,314	30.00%	+13.54
Liberal	Donn Walsh	1,674	21.71%	-10.50
Total		7,712	100.00%	

1978 Saskatchewan general election: Pelly electoral district
Party	Candidate	Votes	%	±%
NDP	Norm Lusney	3,739	56.40%	+8.11
Progressive Conservative	Donald F. Boyd	2,130	32.13%	+2.13
Liberal	Rudolph Els	760	11.47%	-10.24
Total		6,629	100.00%	

1982 Saskatchewan general election: Pelly electoral district
Party	Candidate	Votes	%	±%
NDP	Norm Lusney	3,381	48.05%	-8.35
Progressive Conservative	Mervyn C. Abrahamson	3,179	45.18%	+13.05
Liberal	Tom Campbell	476	6.77%	-4.70
Total		7,036	100.00%	

1986 Saskatchewan general election: Pelly electoral district
Party	Candidate	Votes	%	±%
Progressive Conservative	Rod Gardner	3,280	49.47%	+4.29
NDP	Norm Lusney	3,113	46.95%	-1.10
Liberal	A. Ben Ferrie	237	3.58%	-3.19
Total		6,630	100.00%	

1991 Saskatchewan general election: Pelly electoral district
Party	Candidate	Votes	%	±%
NDP	Ron Harper	3,992	59.59%	+12.64
Progressive Conservative	Bernard Rink	2,055	30.68%	-18.79
Liberal	Louis Sliwa	652	9.73%	+6.15
Total		6,699	100.00%	

== See also ==
- List of Saskatchewan provincial electoral districts
- List of Saskatchewan general elections
- Canadian provincial electoral districts
