= Dan Daniel =

Dan, Danny or Daniel Daniel may refer to:

- Dan Daniel (sportswriter) (1890–1981), American baseball writer
- Dan Daniel (politician) (1914–1988), American Congressman from Virginia
- Dan Daniel (radio personality) (1934–2016), American disc jockey based in New York
- Danny Daniel (born 1942), Spanish-American ballad singer / songwriter, Danny y Donna due with Donna Hightower
- Daniel K. Daniel (born 1986), Nigerian actor, model, voice-over artiste and events compere
- Danny Daniel (born 1988), Colombian pop singer, winner of Premios Oye! 2009 Best New Artist

== See also ==
- Daniel Daniels (disambiguation)
