= John Duff Robertson =

Canadian politician

John Duff Robertson (March 26, 1873 – 1939) was a druggist and political figure in Saskatchewan. He represented Canora in the Legislative Assembly of Saskatchewan from 1908 to 1917 as a Liberal.

He was born in Chesterfield, Oxford County, Ontario, the son of the Reverend William Robertson and Elizabeth Duff, and educated in Elora and at the Ontario College of Pharmacy in Toronto. He lived in Canora, Saskatchewan.

His brother William was a physician in Elora, Ontario, whose daughter Marion married and later divorced Frederick Banting.
