= Leonard Larson =

Canadian politician

Leonard Melvin Larson

MLA for Pelly
- In office 1964–1967
- Preceded by: Jim Barrie
- Succeeded by: Jim Barrie

MLA for Pelly
- In office 1971–1977
- Preceded by: Jim Barrie
- Succeeded by: Norm Lusney

Personal details
- Born: November 11, 1912 Stornoway, Saskatchewan
- Died: March 1977 (aged 64)
- Party: Co-operative Commonwealth Federation; New Democrat

Leonard Melvin Larson (November 11, 1912 – March 1977) was a farmer and political figure in Saskatchewan. He represented Pelly from 1964 to 1967 as a Co-operative Commonwealth Federation (CCF) member and from 1971 to 1977 as a New Democratic Party (NDP) member in the Legislative Assembly of Saskatchewan.

He was born on a farm near Stornoway, Saskatchewan. Larson helped found the Kamsack Credit Union and the Kamsack Community Clinic. He also served as chairman of the local school board, as an officer of the Saskatchewan Wheat Pool and as a member of the Saskatchewan Farmers' Union. Larson ran unsuccessfully for the Yorkton seat in the Canadian House of Commons in the federal elections of 1962 and 1963. He was defeated by Jim Barrie when he ran for reelection to the Saskatchewan assembly in 1967. He died in office at the age of 64.
