= John Gray Banks =

Canadian politician (1888–1961)

MLA for Pelly
- In office 1948–1952
- Preceded by: Dan Daniels
- Succeeded by: Arnold Feusi

Personal details
- Born: June 30, 1888 Durham, Ontario
- Died: June 24, 1961 (aged 72)
- Party: Liberal

John Gray Banks (June 30, 1888 – June 24, 1961) was a lawyer and political figure in Saskatchewan. He represented Pelly from 1948 to 1952 in the Legislative Assembly of Saskatchewan as a Liberal.

He was born in Durham, Ontario, the son of Richard H. Banks and Emily Gray, and was educated in Durham and at the University of Saskatchewan. In 1918, Banks married Edith Verna Allen. He lived in Kamsack, Saskatchewan. Banks was defeated by Arnold Feusi when he ran for reelection to the provincial assembly in 1952.
