= Florence Storgoff =

- Born: 1908; Saskatchewan
- Died: September 11, 1964 (aged 55–56); British Columbia
- Occupations: protester, arsonist
- Years active: 1960s
- Known for: protests, arson

Florence Storgoff, was born in Canora, Saskatchewan in 1908 and died September 11, 1964, in British Columbia. She moved to British Columbia, married and joined the militant Freedomites group, who were sensationalized in the press as "Sons of Freedom." In that movement she and her husband strongly protested against the government and both were arrested. She served three years in the Kingston Penitentiary for women for arson. She gained attention in 1963 when she led the "Trek" involving hundreds of Freedomites camping out at Agassiz Mountain Prison to protest the arrest of fellow members.
