= Charles D. McEwen =

American politician

Charles Dwight McEwen

Member of the Minnesota House of Representatives for District 42
- In office January 3, 1893 – January 7, 1895
- Preceded by: Henry A. Peterson
- Succeeded by: Olaus Brevig

Personal details
- Born: June 20, 1822 Hinesburg, Vermont, U.S.
- Died: July 26, 1901 (aged 79)
- Party: Republican
- Occupation: farmer

Charles Dwight McEwen (June 20, 1822 – July 26, 1901) was an American politician who served in the Minnesota House of Representatives from 1893 to 1895. A Republican, he represented District 42.

Born in Hinesburg, Vermont, McEwen lived in New York and Wisconsin before settling with his family in Minnesota in 1857. The family lived first in Hutchinson, where they owned a cheese factory and Charles McEwen held local office in McLeod County, and later in Boon Lake, where they set up the first cheese factory in Renville County. An abolitionist and a member of the Home Guard, McEwen was elected to the House of Representatives in 1892.

Following his death, his son Bowman maintained the family farm, and served on the Renville County Commission. In 1906, Bowman's daughter Sarah moved with her husband Max Ramsland to Canora, Saskatchewan. Max was elected to the Legislative Assembly of Saskatchewan in 1917, but died after less than a year in office during the 1918 flu pandemic; Sarah was then elected to the legislature as his successor, becoming the first woman ever to serve in Saskatchewan's provincial legislature.
