= Sacred Heart, Minnesota =

City in Minnesota, United States

Sacred Heart
- City
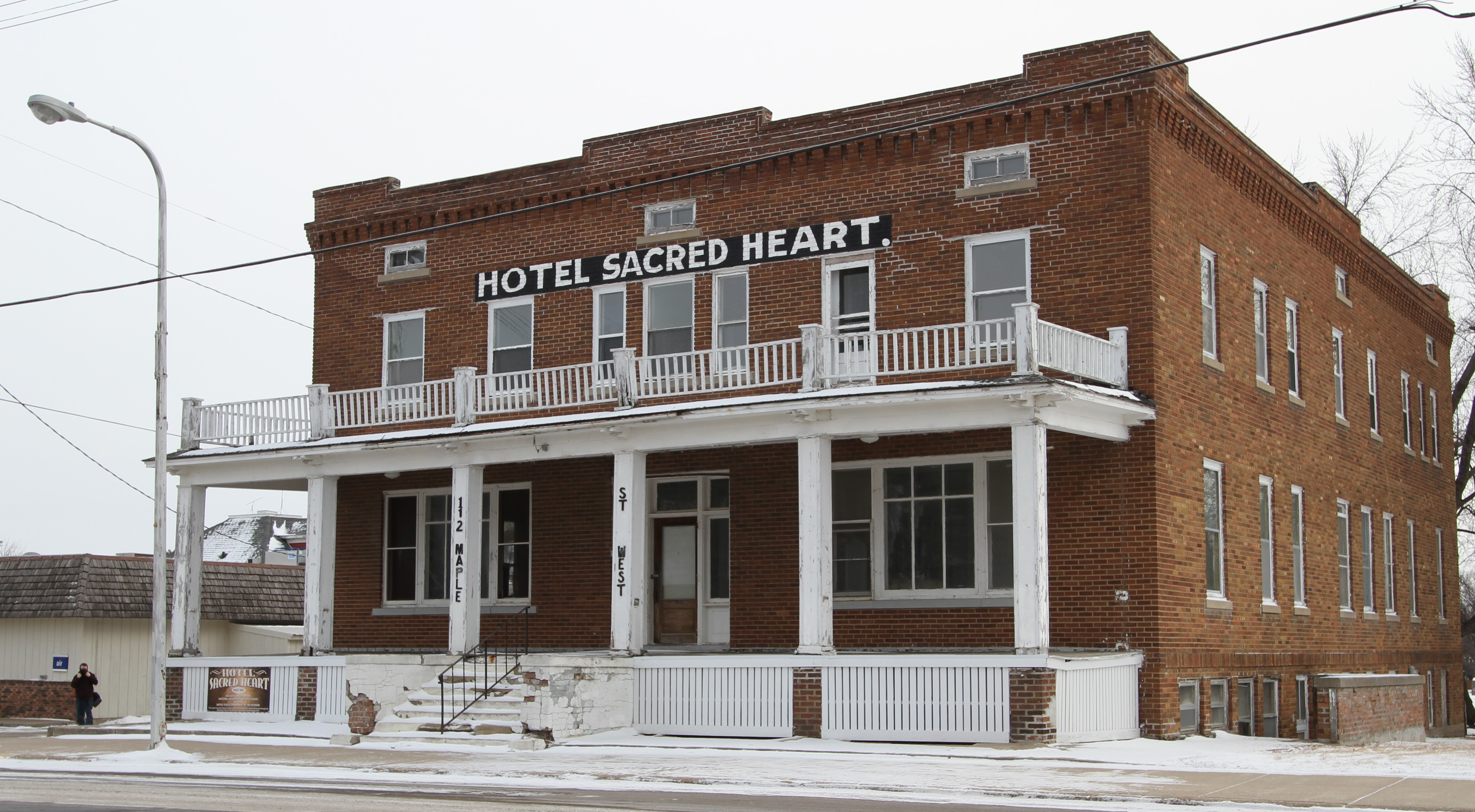
- Hotel Sacred Heart

- Location of Sacred Heart, Minnesota
- Coordinates: 44°47′12″N 95°21′6″W
- Country: United States
- State: Minnesota
- County: Renville

Area
  - Total: 0.99 sq mi (2.57 km^{2})
  - Land: 0.99 sq mi (2.57 km^{2})
  - Water: 0 sq mi (0.00 km^{2})
- Elevation: 1,073 ft (327 m)

Population (2020)
  - Total: 510
  - Density: 514.0/sq mi (198.44/km^{2})
- Time zone: UTC-6 (Central (CST))
  - Summer (DST): UTC-5 (CDT)
- ZIP code: 56285
- Area code: 320
- FIPS code: 27-56572
- GNIS feature ID: 0650451

Sacred Heart is a city in Renville County, Minnesota, United States. As of the 2020 census, Sacred Heart had a population of 510.

== History ==
Sacred Heart was the site of a massacre perpetrated by the Dakota Sioux early in the 1862 Dakota War. All but three of the Settler men in the area were killed, as were many of the women and children, while 22 people were taken captive.

The town of Sacred Heart was platted in 1878. The 1914 Hotel Sacred Heart is listed on the National Register of Historic Places.

== Geography ==
According to the United States Census Bureau, the city has a total area of 0.99 square miles (2.56 km^{2}), all land. It is the westernmost town in Renville County.

U.S. Route 212 serves as a main route in the community.

== Demographics ==
Historical population
Census	Pop.	Note	%±
1880	76		—
1890	327		330.3%
1900	538		64.5%
1910	587		9.1%
1920	763		30.0%
1930	685		−10.2%
1940	752		9.8%
1950	745		−0.9%
1960	696		−6.6%
1970	707		1.6%
1980	666		−5.8%
1990	603		−9.5%
2000	549		−9.0%
2010	548		−0.2%
2020	510		−6.9%
U.S. Decennial Census

=== 2010 census ===
As of the census of 2010, there were 548 people, 235 households, and 139 families living in the city. The population density was 553.5 inhabitants per square mile (213.7/km^{2}). There were 282 housing units at an average density of 284.8 per square mile (110.0/km^{2}). The racial makeup of the city was 98.5% White, 0.2% African American, 0.9% Native American, and 0.4% from other races. Hispanic or Latino of any race were 9.1% of the population.

There were 235 households, of which 29.4% had children under the age of 18 living with them, 42.1% were married couples living together, 9.8% had a female householder with no husband present, 7.2% had a male householder with no wife present, and 40.9% were non-families. 35.7% of all households were made up of individuals, and 19.2% had someone living alone who was 65 years of age or older. The average household size was 2.33 and the average family size was 3.08.

The median age in the city was 36.6 years. 26.3% of residents were under the age of 18; 6.8% were between the ages of 18 and 24; 24.2% were from 25 to 44; 24.8% were from 45 to 64; and 17.9% were 65 years of age or older. The gender makeup of the city was 48.5% male and 51.5% female.

=== 2000 census ===
As of the census of 2000, there were 549 people, 246 households, and 147 families living in the city. The population density was 553.2 inhabitants per square mile (213.6/km^{2}). There were 290 housing units at an average density of 292.2 per square mile (112.8/km^{2}). The racial makeup of the city was 97.45% White, 0.18% Native American, 1.46% from other races, and 0.91% from two or more races. Hispanic or Latino of any race were 7.10% of the population.

There were 246 households, out of which 24.0% had children under the age of 18 living with them, 51.6% were married couples living together, 6.1% had a female householder with no husband present, and 40.2% were non-families. 36.6% of all households were made up of individuals, and 18.7% had someone living alone who was 65 years of age or older. The average household size was 2.23 and the average family size was 2.94.

In the city, the population was spread out, with 24.6% under the age of 18, 7.1% from 18 to 24, 23.0% from 25 to 44, 23.3% from 45 to 64, and 22.0% who were 65 years of age or older. The median age was 42 years. For every 100 females, there were 87.4 males. For every 100 females age 18 and over, there were 84.8 males.

The median income for a household in the city was $32,333, and the median income for a family was $40,313. Males had a median income of $28,654 versus $22,019 for females. The per capita income for the city was $18,089. About 5.4% of families and 10.9% of the population were below the poverty line, including 21.0% of those under age 18 and none of those age 65 or over.

== Recreation ==
Sacred Heart has a baseball complex where the local Saints team plays baseball. Next door to the baseball field is an outdoor ice skating rink maintained in the winter months.

There is one primary park in town that has tennis courts available, along with a picnic pavilion, cooking grills and playgrounds for children.

== Notable people ==
- Ole Ramsland, Minnesota state representative
- Max Ramsland, Saskatchewan provincial legislator
- Alpha Sunde Smaby, Minnesota state representative
