= Hotel Sacred Heart =

- U.S. National Register of Historic Places
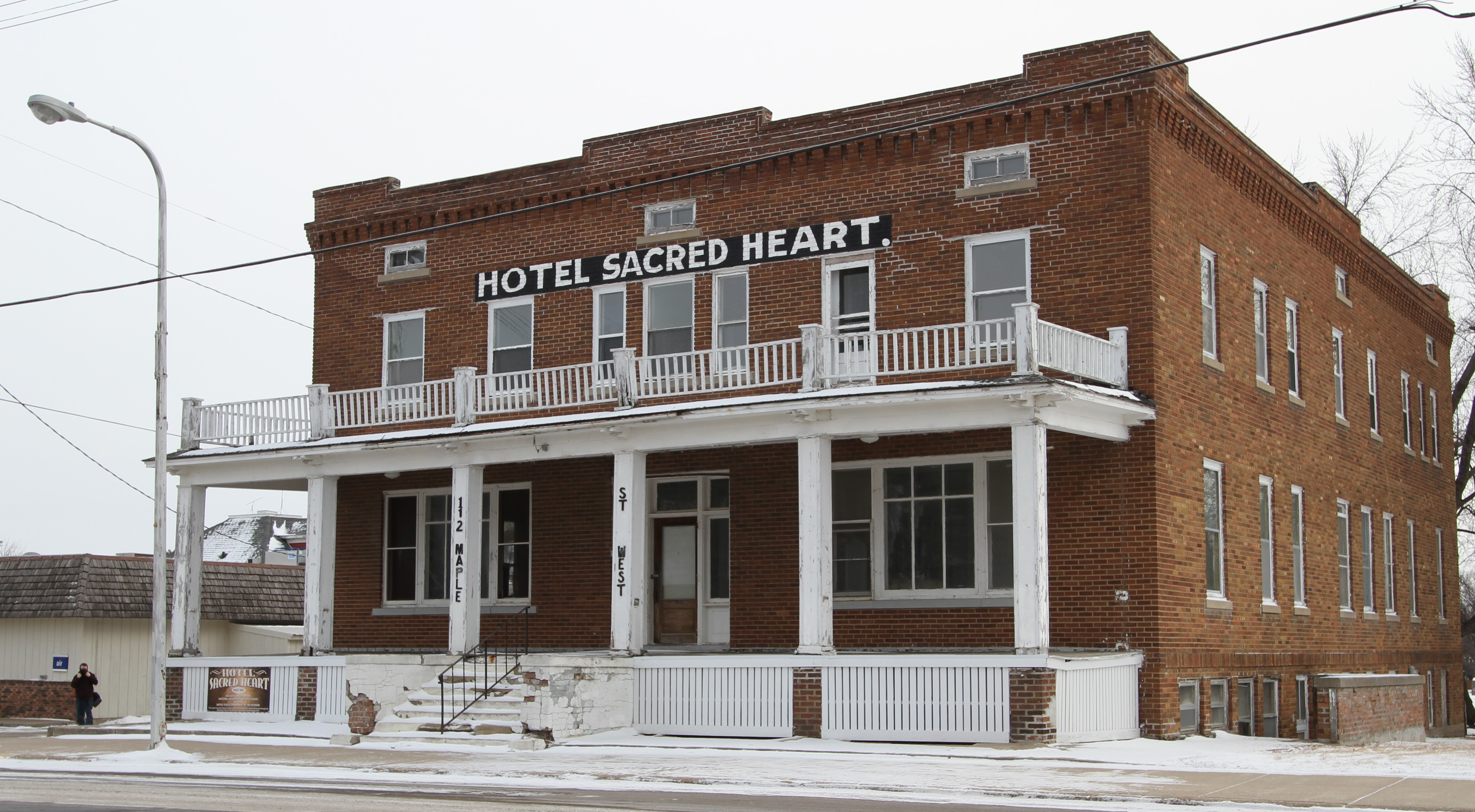
- The hotel in 2018

- Location within Minnesota Location within the United States
- Location: 112 West Maple Street, Sacred Heart, Minnesota
- Coordinates: 44°47′12″N 95°21′3.5″W
- Built: 1914
- NRHP reference No.: 16000279
- Added to NRHP: May 23, 2016

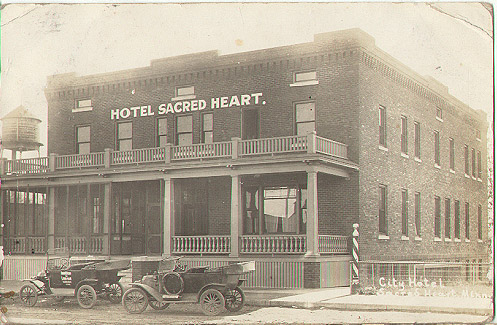
The hotel on a 1914 postcard

Hotel Sacred Heart (also called the Romborg Hotel from a combination of names of previous owners) is a 1914 brick hotel building in Sacred Heart, Minnesota, United States. It was added to the National Register of Historic Places in 2016 due to the efforts of a local group which received a historic preservation grant.

== See also ==
- National Register of Historic Places listings in Renville County, Minnesota
