= Amsterdam, Saskatchewan =

Community in Saskatchewan, Canada

Amsterdam
- Organized Hamlet
- Hamlet of Amsterdam
- Location within Saskatchewan Location within Canada
- Coordinates: 51°37′37″N 102°26′53″W
- Country: Canada
- Province: Saskatchewan
- Region: East-central
- Census division: 9
- Rural municipality: Buchanan No. 304

Government
  - Type: Municipal
  - Governing body: Rural Municipality of Buchanan
  - Reeve: Don Skoretz
  - Administrator: Twila Hadubiak

Area
  - Total: 0.31 km^{2} (0.12 sq mi)

Population (2016)
  - Total: 25
  - Density: 80.7/km^{2} (209/sq mi)
- Time zone: UTC-6 (CST)
- Postal code: S0A 0L0
- Area code: 306
- Highways: Highway 9
- Railways: (Canadian National Railway)

Amsterdam is a hamlet within the Rural Municipality of Buchanan No. 304, Saskatchewan, Canada. Listed as a designated place by Statistics Canada, the hamlet had a population of 25 in the Canada 2016 Census. The hamlet is located 64 kilometres (40 mi) north of the city of Yorkton and 1.5 kilometres (0.93 mi) west of Highway 9. The community was founded at the turn of the 20th century by Dutch immigrants, hence the name. In its prime, the community had a post office, grain elevator, garage, and a school. It, like many small towns, has been hit hard by the gradual trend toward urbanization. The hamlet now has fewer than 25 people; most are of Ukrainian descent.

== Demographics ==
In the 2021 Census of Population conducted by Statistics Canada, Amsterdam had a population of 30 living in 13 of its 14 total private dwellings, a change of 20% from its 2016 population of 25. With a land area of 0.3 km^{2} (0.12 sq mi), it had a population density of 100.0/km^{2} (259.0/sq mi) in 2021.

Canada census – Amsterdam, Saskatchewan community profile

	2016	2011
Population	25 (-3.5% from 2011)	26 (+36.8% from 2006)
Land area	0.31 km^{2} (0.12 sq mi)	0.31 km^{2} (0.12 sq mi)
Population density	80.7/km^{2} (209/sq mi)	83.9/km^{2} (217/sq mi)
Median age
Private dwellings	10 (total)	13 (total)
Median household income

References: 2016 2011

== See also ==
- List of communities in Saskatchewan
- List of hamlets in Saskatchewan
- Block settlements
