= Rural Municipality of Keys No. 303 =

Rural municipality in Saskatchewan, Canada

Keys No. 303
- Rural municipality
- Rural Municipality of Keys No. 303
- Location of the RM of Keys No. 303 in Saskatchewan
- Coordinates: 51.753°N 102.153°W
- Country: Canada
- Province: Saskatchewan
- Census division: 9
- SARM division: 4
- Formed: January 1, 1913

Government
  - Reeve: Garth Bates
  - Governing body: RM of Keys No. 303 Council
  - Administrator: Barry Hvidston
  - Office location: Canora

Area (2016)
  - Land: 661.61 km^{2} (255.45 sq mi)

Population (2016)
  - Total: 390
  - Density: 0.6/km^{2} (1.6/sq mi)
- Time zone: CST
  - Summer (DST): CST
- Area codes: 306 and 639

The Rural Municipality of Keys No. 303 (2016 population: 390) is a rural municipality (RM) in the Canadian province of Saskatchewan within Census Division No. 9 and SARM Division No. 4.

== History ==
The RM of Keys No. 303 incorporated as a rural municipality on January 1, 1913.

== Geography ==
=== Communities and localities ===
The following unincorporated communities are within the RM.

Organized hamlets

- Crystal Lake

== Demographics ==
Population history (1981–2016)
Year	Pop.	±%
1981	628	—
1986	604	−3.8%
1991	543	−10.1%
1996	448	−17.5%
2001	443	−1.1%
2006	397	−10.4%
2011	417	+5.0%
2016	390	−6.5%
Source: Statistics Canada via Saskatchewan Bureau of Statistics

In the 2021 Census of Population conducted by Statistics Canada, the RM of Keys No. 303 had a population of 548 living in 199 of its 379 total private dwellings, a change of 31.7% from its 2016 population of 416. With a land area of 656.49 km^{2} (253.47 sq mi), it had a population density of 0.8/km^{2} (2.2/sq mi) in 2021.

In the 2016 Census of Population, the RM of Keys No. 303 recorded a population of 390 living in 159 of its 282 total private dwellings, a −6.5% change from its 2011 population of 417. With a land area of 661.61 km^{2} (255.45 sq mi), it had a population density of 0.6/km^{2} (1.5/sq mi) in 2016.

== Attractions ==
- Crystal Lake

== Government ==
The RM's office is located in the Town of Canora.

== Government ==
The RM of Keys No. 303 is governed by an elected municipal council and an appointed administrator that meets on the first Thursday of every month. The reeve of the RM is Garth Bates while its administrator is Barry Hvidston. The RM's office is located in Canora.

== Transportation ==
- Saskatchewan Highway 9
- Saskatchewan Highway 49
- Saskatchewan Highway 650
- Saskatchewan Highway 754

== See also ==
- List of rural municipalities in Saskatchewan
