= Harry Fain =

American lawyer

Harry Fain (December 30, 1918 – July 13, 2007) was an American family law attorney who represented clients such as Elvis Presley, Lee Majors, Rod Steiger and Marguerite Simpson, the first wife of O. J. Simpson. In 1966, the California Governor Pat Brown appointed Fain to a Governor's Commission on the Family to study changes in law related to the family. The recommendations of the commission played a significant role in the passage of California's Family Law Act of 1970 introducing no-fault divorce.

== Early life and career ==
Fain was born in Canora, Saskatchewan but grew up in Winnipeg, Manitoba. After graduating from high school, Fain went to the University of California in Los Angeles (UCLA) and represented UCLA in soccer. He joined the United States Army Air Forces where he worked in military intelligence. He studied law at the University of Southern California in 1946.

For most of his career, Fain practiced family law in Beverly Hills, California. He divorced his first wife, Shirley Fain, in the early 1950s and eventually succeeded in obtaining custody of their three young children after it had initially been granted to his ex-wife. His position as an advocate of fathers rights and his support for the decision of custody being granted in the best interests of the children dates from that time.

== Governor's Commission on the Family ==
Governor Pat Brown appointed Fain as one of the members of the Governor's Commission on the Family in 1966. The Commission recommended several significant changes to California family law including no-fault divorce, an equal division of property in marriage and a family court covering all of California. The 1970 Family Law Act was based, in part, on its recommendations.

== High profile family lawyer ==
Fain became a principal of Fain, Lavine, Kaufman and Young in Beverly Hills. He represented many high profile individuals in family law matters. Fain negotiated a $1.5 million settlement between Elvis Presley and Priscilla Presley in 1973 as well as working for Cary Grant, Ali MacGraw, Rod Steiger, Lee Majors and Marguerite Simpson.

Fain was a founder and president of the American Academy of Matrimonial Lawyers.

Fain died from pneumonia in July 2007.
