= Terry Dennis =

Canadian provincial politician

Member of the Saskatchewan Legislative Assembly for Canora-Pelly
- In office April 4, 2016 – October 1, 2024
- Preceded by: Ken Krawetz
- Succeeded by: Sean Wilson

Personal details
- Born: 1961 (age 64–65)
- Party: Saskatchewan Party

Terry Dennis is a Canadian provincial politician, who served as the Member of the Legislative Assembly of Saskatchewan for the riding of Canora-Pelly. He was first elected in the 2016 provincial election and sat as an MLA until 2024. He is a member of the Saskatchewan Party.

Dennis served as a town councillor and later as mayor of the town of Canora, Saskatchewan, holding the latter position for fourteen years. He was also the co-owner of Dennis' Foods, a grocery store in Canora that had been owned by the Dennis family since 1947. The store was sold in the year 2016. He has been twice convicted of drunk driving, once in 1979 and again in 2001 during his first term as mayor. In October 2023, he lost re-nomination for the 2024 Saskatchewan general election to Sean Wilson.

== Electoral history ==
=== 2016 Saskatchewan general election ===
2016 Saskatchewan general election: Canora-Pelly
Party	Candidate	Votes	%	±%
Saskatchewan	Terry Dennis	4,318	67.46	-3.69
New Democratic	Theresa Wilson	1,323	20.67	-6.31
Progressive Conservative	Merv Malischewski	414	6.46	-
Liberal	Kyle Budz	192	3.00	-
Green	Rachel Gregoire	102	1.59	-0.28
Western Independence	David Sawkiw	51	0.79	-
Total valid votes		6,400	100.0	
Eligible voters		–		
Saskatchewan hold		Swing		+5.00%
Source: Elections Saskatchewan
