= Anton O. Morken =

Canadian politician

Anton Olsen Morken (March 17, 1885 – August 1959) was a Norwegian-born farmer and political figure in Saskatchewan. He represented Canora in the Legislative Assembly of Saskatchewan from 1929 to 1934 as a Liberal.

He was born in Kvam, Oppland in Gudbrand Valley, the son of Ole Eriksen Stormorken and Embjørg Amundsdatter Stormorken (née Stenen), and was educated there. Morken came to Canada in 1906. In 1919, he married Hulda Marie Erickson (née Lindblom). Morken lived in Sturgis, Saskatchewan. He was president of the Sturgis Telephone Company, a member of the local school board, and a founding member of the Sturgis Credit Union. He was also a grain dealer and part owner of a garage. Morken served overseas with the Canadian Army during World War I. He died of a heart attack at the age of 74.

Morken Lake, located north of La Ronge, was named in his honour.
