= Jim Barrie =

Canadian politician

James Ross Barrie

MLA for Pelly
- In office 1956–1964
- Preceded by: Arnold Feusi
- Succeeded by: Leonard Larson

MLA for Pelly
- In office 1967–1971
- Preceded by: Leonard Larson
- Succeeded by: Leonard Larson

Personal details
- Born: August 14, 1904 Morden, Manitoba, Canada
- Died: November 1976 (aged 72)
- Party: Liberal

James Ross Barrie (August 14, 1904 – November 1976) was a merchant and political figure in Saskatchewan. He represented Pelly from 1956 to 1964 and from 1967 to 1971 in the Legislative Assembly of Saskatchewan as a Liberal.

He was born in Morden, Manitoba and was educated in Manitoba and British Columbia. Barrie was a general merchant in Pelly, Saskatchewan from 1922 to 1948. In 1940, he was an unsuccessful Liberal candidate for the Mackenzie seat in the Canadian House of Commons. From 1950 to 1958, he was a general insurance agent. He was defeated by Leonard Larson when he ran for reelection to the provincial assembly in 1964 and then defeated Larson in the general election of 1967. He served in the provincial cabinet as Minister of Natural Resources. Barrie was defeated by Larson when he ran for reelection in 1971.

Barrie played an important role in the preservation of Fort Pelly, now a national historic site, by helping to found the Fort Pelly Historical Society and by focusing attention of the site.
