= Arnold Feusi =

Canadian politician

Arnold Joseph Feusi

MLA for Pelly
- In office 1952–1956
- Preceded by: John Banks
- Succeeded by: Jim Barrie

Personal details
- Born: March 31, 1912 Superior, Wisconsin
- Died: January 14, 1998 (aged 85) Prince Albert, Saskatchewan
- Party: Co-operative Commonwealth Federation

Arnold Joseph Feusi (March 31, 1912 – January 14, 1998) was an American-born educator, civil servant and political figure in Saskatchewan. He represented Pelly from 1952 to 1956 in the Legislative Assembly of Saskatchewan as a Co-operative Commonwealth Federation (CCF) member.

He was born in Superior, Wisconsin and moved with his parents to the Langenburg district of Saskatchewan at a young age. Feusi was educated in Langenburg and at the Saskatoon Normal School. He taught school in Langenburg and later Weyburn. In 1941, he married Sally Dilschneider. During World War II, Feusi served in the Royal Canadian Air Force. He was later employed with the provincial departments of Natural Resources and Tourism. Feusi also served on the local school board. He was defeated by Jim Barrie when he ran for reelection to the provincial assembly in 1956. Feusi died in Prince Albert at the age of 85.
