= Dan Daniels (politician) =

Canadian politician

MLA for Pelly
- In office 1944–1948
- Preceded by: Reginald Parker
- Succeeded by: John Banks

Personal details
- Born: Daniel Zederayko Daniels; November 8, 1908 Gorlitz, Saskatchewan
- Died: November 11, 1991 (aged 83) Canora, Saskatchewan
- Party: Co-operative Commonwealth Federation
- Spouse: Kathleen Franko
- Occupation: educator

Daniel Zederayko Daniels (November 8, 1908 – November 11, 1991) was an educator, merchant, farmer and political figure in Saskatchewan. He represented Pelly from 1944 to 1948 in the Legislative Assembly of Saskatchewan as a Co-operative Commonwealth Federation (CCF) member.

== Life ==
He was born near Gorlitz, Saskatchewan, the son of Daniel Daniels and Axana Hanthar, both Ukrainian immigrants to Canada. Daniels was educated in Yorkton and Regina. In 1937, he married Kathleen Franko. Daniels also taught school in Saskatchewan for 8 years. He lived in Canora. Daniels was defeated by John Gray Banks when he ran for reelection to the provincial assembly in 1948. He served as mayor of Canora from 1952 to 1958. Daniels later served as president of the Canora Union Hospital and as vice-president of the Saskatchewan seniors' association. He died at the Canora Union Hospital at the age of 83.
