= Tadmore, Saskatchewan =

Tadmore
- Organized hamlet
- Hamlet of Tadmore
- Location within Saskatchewan
- Coordinates: 51°50′03″N 102°28′48″W
- Country: Canada
- Province: Saskatchewan
- Region: East-central
- Census division: 9
- Rural Municipality: Buchanan No. 304

Government
  - Type: Municipal
  - Governing body: Rural Municipality of Buchanan
  - Reeve: Don Skoretz
  - Administrator: Twila Hadubiak

Area
  - Total: 0.30 km^{2} (0.12 sq mi)

Population (2016)
  - Total: 25
  - Density: 67.5/km^{2} (175/sq mi)
- Time zone: UTC-6 (CST)
- Area code: 306
- Highways: Highway 9
- Railways: Canadian National Railway

Tadmore is a hamlet within the Rural Municipality of Buchanan No. 304, Saskatchewan, Canada.

The community is likely named for ancient Palmyra in Syria, whose local name is Tadmor (Arabic: Tadmur).

== Demographics ==
In the 2021 Census of Population conducted by Statistics Canada, Tadmore had a population of 20 living in 10 of its 16 total private dwellings, a change of 0% from its 2016 population of 20. With a land area of 0.26 km^{2} (0.10 sq mi), it had a population density of 76.9/km^{2} (199.2/sq mi) in 2021.

== See also ==
- List of communities in Saskatchewan
- List of hamlets in Saskatchewan
