= Canora station (Saskatchewan) =

Railway station in Saskatchewan, Canada

Canora
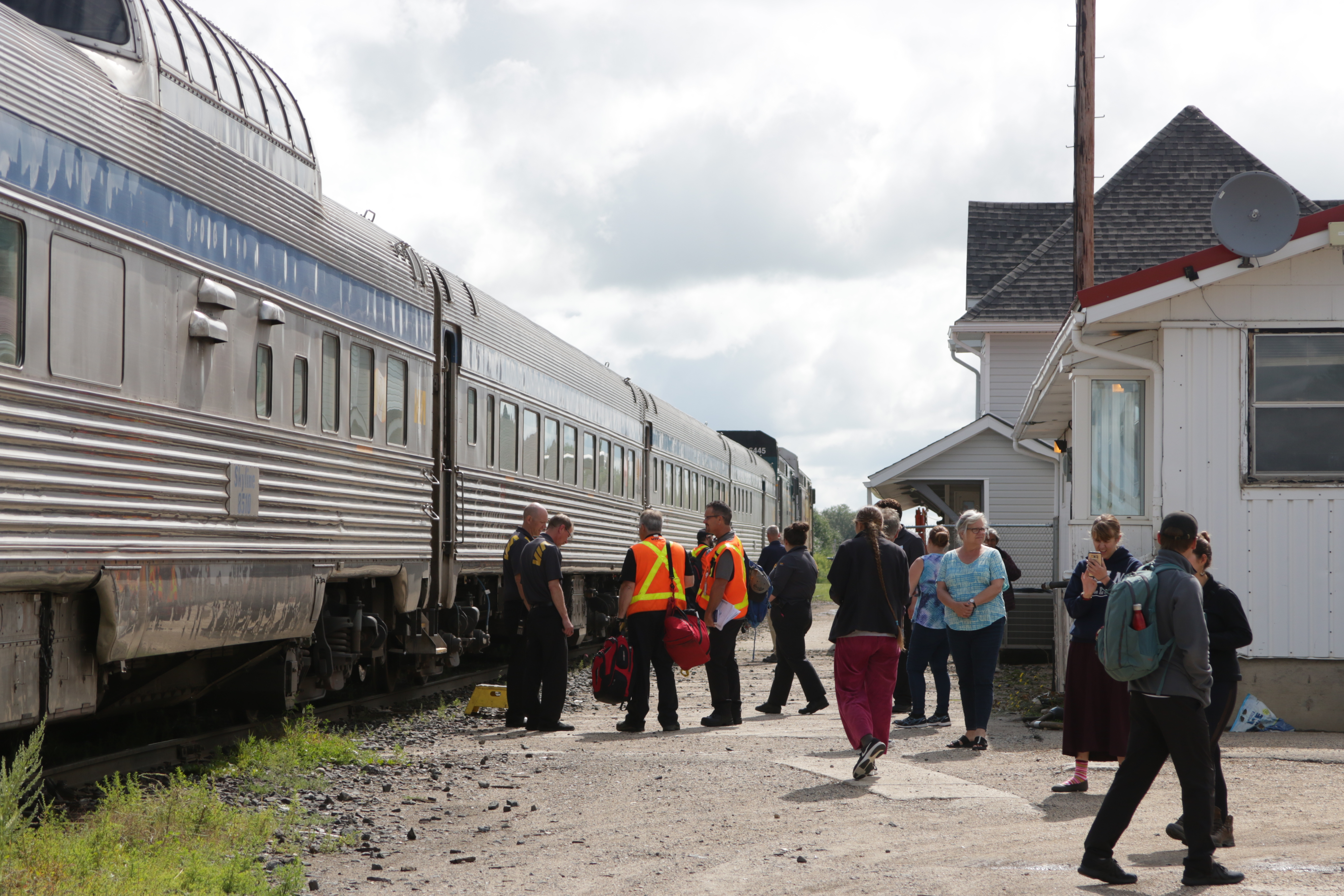

General information
- Location: 100 Railway Avenue; Canora, SK; S0A 0L0, Canada
- Coordinates: 51.6375°N 102.4365°W
- Line: Winnipeg – Churchill train
- Platforms: 1
- Tracks: 1

Construction
- Structure type: Shelter
- Platform levels: 1
- Parking: yes

Services
Preceding station	Via Rail	Following station
Sturgis toward Churchill	Winnipeg–Churchill	Mikado toward Winnipeg
Former services
Preceding station	Canadian National Railway	Following station
Tiny toward Calgary	Calgary – Winnipeg	Mikado toward Winnipeg
Terminus	Canora – Wroxton	Ross Junction toward Wroxton
Burgis toward Regina	Regina – Hudson Bay Junction	Amsterdam toward Hudson Bay Junction
Location

The Canora station is a railway station in Canora, Saskatchewan, Canada. The station is served by Via Rail's Winnipeg – Churchill train twice per week in each direction.

The station houses the Canora Station House Museum and is the oldest Class II railway station still in operation in Saskatchewan. The town of Canora itself is named for the first letters of each word in Canadian Northern Railway.
