= Joseph Albert McClure =

Canadian politician

Joseph Albert "Bert" McClure (April 3, 1881 – July 27, 1967) was a farmer and political figure in Saskatchewan. He represented Canora from 1925 to 1929 in the Legislative Assembly of Saskatchewan as a Progressive Party member.

He was born in Snelgrove, Ontario, the son of Thomas McClure and Janet Moore. He travelled west to Saskatchewan in 1902 and spent the fall harvesting grain in Assinaboine. During the winter that followed, McClure worked at a sawmill in Gimli, Manitoba and for a grain elevator company in Winnipeg. The following year, he bought a homestead near Sturgis, Saskatchewan. In 1911, McClure married Floy Nesbit.Together they had two daughters: Hester Louis McClure and Alberta "Berta" McClure. The McClures grew grain and raised purebred Shorthorn cattle and Clydesdale horses on their farm. In 1949, they sold the farm and returned to Ontario, moving to the town of Erin, where they remained until their deaths in 1967.
