= Darrel Cunningham =

Canadian politician

MLA for Canora
- In office 1991–1995

Personal details
- Born: January 23, 1948 (age 78) Kelvington, Saskatchewan
- Party: Saskatchewan New Democratic Party

Darrel Cunningham (born January 23, 1948) was a Canadian politician. He served in the Legislative Assembly of Saskatchewan from 1991 to 1995, as a NDP member for the constituency of Canora.
