= Freedomites =

Ethnic Russian Christian group living in Canada during the early 20th century

The Freedomite movement split-off from the Doukhobors, a community of Spiritual Christians who began a mass migration from Russia to Canada in 1898. The Freedomite movement first appeared in 1902 in what is now Saskatchewan, and later most moved to the Kootenay and Boundary Districts of British Columbia.

Freedomites began to divide from Doukhobors in 1902 in Saskatchewan, Canada, self-named as "God's people" and Svobodniki (Russian: "sovereign/ free people"). The faction, later called "Freedomites", opposed land ownership, public schools, using work animals, etc. and are mainly known for protesting nude. By 1920 the common English term for them became Sons of Freedom.

Of about 20,000 active Doukhobors in Canada today, ancestors of about 2,500 were Freedomites, and many descendants have joined the USCC Community Doukhobors.

== Doctrine ==
Freedomite meetings were similar to other spiritual Christian folk-Protestants from Russia. They met in simple buildings, sat on benches, men and women separated facing each other, prayed in Russian, sang religious hymns and songs in Russian, and spoke about matters of religious and community interest mostly in Russian. The ideals of the Freedomites emphasized basic traditional Russian communal living and action — growing food, building homes, living a peaceful rural life, ecstatic religious doctrine when agitated for protest, and anarchic attitudes towards external regulation.

Freedomites were strict vegetarians and oppose all government regulation.

== Public protest ==
Although Canada at first provided a more tolerant religious environment than the Russian Empire, conflict soon developed, most importantly over the schooling of children and land registration. These Svobodniki generally refused to send their children to government-run schools. The governments of Saskatchewan and later British Columbia did not heed reports by sociologists to appease the concerns of parents, and chose to legally charge many of the parents for not sending the children to school.

The Svobodniki became famous for various public protests—sometimes publicly burning their own money and possessions and parading nude in public. There was a doctrinal justification for nudity: that human skin, as God's creation, was more perfect than clothes, the imperfect work of human hands. This public nudity has generally been interpreted as a form of protest against the materialist tendencies of society. Nudity is sometimes used as a tactic during a protest to attract media and public attention to a cause. Public nudity is used widely around the world today, with groups like the Ukrainian feminist activist group FEMEN, and the animal rights organization PETA.

A small minority of the Freedomites were noted for their arson campaigns, as a protest against materialistic life. They targeted belongings and other material possessions. The attacks occurred throughout the 20th century, but the periods of greatest activity were during the 1920s and 1960s. Both arson and bombing were used. The first use of explosives occurred in 1923, and two were killed by their own bombs in 1958 and 1962. Targets included their own property and unfortunate Doukhobor neighbors to further exhibit their loathing of materialism, attacks on schools to resist government pressure to school Svobodnik children, and attacks on transportation and communications. One such incident was the bombing of a railway bridge in Nelson, British Columbia in 1961. Most of these acts were committed in the nude.

Among the reactions of the British Columbia and Canadian government was taking away Freedomite children and placing them in an internment center in New Denver. Abuse of these children was later alleged, and a formal apology demanded. The BC government made an official Statement of Regret that satisfied some, but not others. The Government of Canada has not apologized for its role in the removal, saying that it is not responsible for actions taken by the government in place 50 years ago. On February 1, 2024, the provincial British Columbian government formally apologized for the treatment of the Freedomite children.

== Operation Snatch ==
Between 1953 and 1959, roughly 200 Sons of Freedom (Freedomite) children, aged 7–15, were seized by the BC government, the Royal Canadian Mounted Police (RCMP), and the federal government in "Operation Snatch". These children were confined in New Denver, BC in a prison-like setting. The Sons of Freedom children are alleged to have lost their human rights throughout their imprisonment by the BC government.

The following is a timeline of the actions that were taken leading up to, during, and after the confinement of the children.

- 1952: Newly elected Social Credit government led by W. A. C. Bennett began to take a tougher stance on the misnamed "Doukhobor Problem".

Meanwhile, a report by the University of British Columbia was released, discouraging the seizure of the Sons of Freedom children.

- 1953: The conservative Social Credit government was determined to end the "disorder" caused by the radical Sons of Freedom.

A new law, the British Columbia School Act, made state-run education for all children mandatory. Shortly thereafter, the government began shipping students to residential schools.

- September 9, 1953: The RCMP arrested 148 adults for parading nude near a school. They were taken to Vancouver, convicted, and sentenced to terms in the Oakalla prison.

104 children were taken by bus to a residential school in New Denver.

- January 18, 1955: The RCMP put "Operation Krestova" into action and raided the village of Krestova.

Operation Krestova was declared a success as 70 policemen removed 40 children from their homes. The number of children in the New Denver school was increased to 72. The Department of Health would only approve a maximum of 45-50 children.

- 1955: The government considered applying the Protection of Children Act to the Sons of Freedom children. This would allow the children to be held in New Denver until they reached 18 years of age, for being truant from school.
- January 6, 1956: Five members of the RCMP were sent searching for truant children pursuant to a search warrant.
- May 1956: It was recommended that family visits to the school be reduced to one hour every three months by only two family members.
- July 1956: A second director took over as head of New Denver School, and a fence was put up around the grounds. Visits with parents were conducted through the fence as RCMP patrolled the grounds during the visits.
- 1956: Doukhobors in BC regained the right to vote in provincial and federal elections.
- 1958: One of the Sons of Freedom was killed by his own bomb.
- July 31, 1959: Parents were compelled to swear before a magistrate to send their children to school.
- August 2, 1959: The remaining 77 children in New Denver were released.
- 1956 to 1959: A review of the director's monthly notes revealed that punishment was given on many occasions in the form of lost family visits.
- 1959–1962: Freedomites destroyed the property of the Community and Independent Doukhobors, the Canadian Pacific Railway, and public buildings. Hundreds of Freedomites were arrested and jailed during this time.
- 1961: Doukhobors in BC were able to buy back their land from the provincial government. Buy-backs were restricted to individuals who were not part of a commune.
- 1962: One of the Sons of Freedom was killed by his own bomb
- 1962: Sons of Freedom from the town of Krestova made their way to Vancouver to raise public awareness and protest against the arrest of their supporters for arson and bombings.

The BC Civil Liberties Association was launched, based on the human rights concerns about their treatment by the government.

- 1964–1984: The Doukhobors were the primary organizers for many of the anti-war and anti-arms demonstrations in Canada, as well as a 50,000 kilometre (30,000 mile) "Peace and Friendship Caravan International" from BC to the USSR.
- 1971: A new policy of multiculturalism was announced by the Government of Canada. The intention was to commemorate and to recognize the diversity of Canadians.

A replica of the Doukhobor community home near Castlegar was completed by the Kootenay Doukhobor Historical Society.

- 1975: Following the destruction of the Union of Spiritual Communities of Christ Community Centre in Grand Forks, the USCC opened a new community centre in Grand Forks.

The Freedomites were suspected of setting fire to the USCC Community Centre.

- 1980: Official opening of the National Doukhobor Heritage Village in Verigin, Saskatchewan, centred on the dom or community home built for Peter V. Verigin.
- 1982–1986: After 40 years of bombings and arson by the Sons of Freedom, the BC government organized the Expanded Kootenay Committee on Intergroup Relations. It brought together representatives of various Doukhobor groups, governmental departments, and police.
- 1999: An ombudsman's report was released. It called for an apology that was unconditional, clear, and public. It also listed other recommendations for reconciliation. Shortly thereafter, the government started to formulate a response, deciding that all legal suits that were asking for compensation for abuse be sent straight to the courts. None of these lawsuits was successful.
- March 2000: The Law Commission of Canada completed an extensive study on institutional child abuse in Canada, producing a final report entitled "Restoring Dignity".

The Law Commission of Canada recommended that the provincial and federal governments correct the historical wrongs, in the best interests of Canadian society.

- October 2004: Members of the New Denver Survivors Collective attended the British Columbia Legislature, believing they would finally be granted an apology. Instead, Geoff Plant delivered a "statement of regret" on behalf of the BC government.
- February 2024: The province of British Columbia officially apologized for historic wrongs it committed against the Sons of Freedom Doukhobors and their families, and announced a $10 million compensation package to survivors.

When the government made a decision to seize the Sons of Freedom children, it was in an attempt to respond to the widespread civil disorder happening in the Kootenays. The Federal Department of Justice faced two problems with the apprehension and conviction of the Sons of Freedom: where should the adult convicts be confined and what should be done with their children?

In the years leading up to the creation of the residential schools, the Sons of Freedom had become a concern for the province of British Columbia as a whole; they seemed to have a problem with any sort of government, in addition to the laws and policies that were being enforced. Public and Authorities were unhappy because the Sons of Freedom did not register their births, deaths or marriages that occurred within their communities; nor did they send their children to public schools. Public alarm was increasing, based on the fears that the unruly incidents of nude protests, burning of homes and buildings and bombings of bridges and railways, were not being attended to by the RCMP.

"It was between 5 a.m. and 6 a.m. and Elsie Ericson's mother had just begun lighting the stove when four RCMP officers barged into their tiny wooden home in the village of Krestova, B.C. The child jumped out of bed and hid under it, only to be dragged out by their feet. Elsie and her brother spent the next four years in what she said felt like a jail. They were housed with nearly 200 other in a residential school in New Denver, B.C."

== See also ==
- Anarchism in Canada
- Freeman on the land movement
- Florence Storgoff
- Mountain Institution
- Sovereign citizen movement
