= Canora-Pelly =

Provincial electoral district in Saskatchewan, Canada

Coordinates: 52°00′N 102°20′W

Saskatchewan electoral district

Provincial electoral district
- Legislature: Legislative Assembly of Saskatchewan
MLA
Sean Wilson
Saskatchewan
- District created: 1994
- First contested: 1995
- Last contested: 2024

Demographics
- Electors: 9,906
- Census subdivision(s): Buchanan, Canora, Ebenezer, Endeavour, Kamsack, Norquay, Pelly, Preeceville, Springside, Sturgis, Theodore

Canora-Pelly is a provincial electoral district for the Legislative Assembly of Saskatchewan, Canada. Located in east-central Saskatchewan, this constituency is made up of one of the province's most densely populated rural areas. The economy is based on mixed farming, primarily in the northern areas. The southern portion of the region relies mainly on straight grain farming. Duck Mountain Provincial Park and Good Spirit Lake Provincial Park are also located in this constituency.

In 1899, much of the territory now covered by the Canora-Pelly district fell within the block settlement land grant that became the first Canadian home of the Doukhobors. The village of Veregin, named after Doukhobor leader Peter Verigin, was the central hub of the settlement.

The largest communities are Canora and Kamsack, with populations of 2,013 and 1,713, respectively. Other centres in the riding include the towns of Preeceville, Norquay, Springside, and Sturgis; and the villages of Pelly, Theodore, Endeavour, Buchanan, and Ebenezer (formerly "Ebenezer Valley").

== History ==
The constituency was created by the Representation Act, 1994 (Saskatchewan) out of the former districts of Canora and Pelly and was first contested in the 1995 general election.

Before the 2003 general election, the riding was significantly reconfigured, swapping large areas of territory to and from Kelvington-Wadena and also gaining the northern portion of the former Saltcoats riding. For the 2016 general election, the riding lost its northern sections to Carrot River Valley and gained some territory from Melville-Saltcoats and Yorkton, including the area immediately surrounding the Yorkton city limits.

Before the next general election, the riding will expand westward and gain territory from Last Mountain-Touchwood and Kelvington-Wadena, including the villages of Invermay and Theodore.

== Members of the Legislative Assembly ==
This riding has elected the following members of the Legislative Assembly:

Legislature	Years	Member	Party
Canora-Pelly; Riding created from Canora and Pelly
23rd	1995–1997	Ken Krawetz	Liberal
23rd	1997–1999	Ken Krawetz	Saskatchewan
24th	1999–2003	Ken Krawetz	Saskatchewan
25th	2003–2007	Ken Krawetz	Saskatchewan
26th	2007–2011	Ken Krawetz	Saskatchewan
27th	2011–2016	Ken Krawetz	Saskatchewan
28th	2016–2020	Terry Dennis	Saskatchewan
29th	2020–2024	Terry Dennis	Saskatchewan
30th	2024–present	Sean Wilson	Saskatchewan

== Election results ==
=== 2024 ===
2024 Saskatchewan general election
Party	Candidate	Votes	%	±%
Saskatchewan	Sean Wilson	5,227	71.07	+2.76
New Democratic	Wynn Fedorchuk	1,751	23.81	-0.16
Buffalo	Niall Schofield	223	3.03	-2.60
Green	Casimira Rimando	154	2.09	-
Total valid votes		7,355		
Total rejected ballots				
Turnout				
Eligible voters		–		
Saskatchewan hold		Swing		–
Source: Elections Saskatchewan

=== 2020 ===
2020 provincial election redistributed results
Party	%
Saskatchewan	68.7
New Democratic	22.1
Buffalo	5.5
Green	2.2

2020 Saskatchewan general election
Party	Candidate	Votes	%	±%
Saskatchewan	Terry Dennis	4,343	68.31	+0.85
New Democratic	Stacey Strykowski	1,524	23.97	+3.30
Buffalo	Robert Hayes	358	5.63	–
Green	Breton Gattinger	133	2.09	+0.50
Total valid votes		6,358	99.56	
Total rejected ballots		28	0.44	–
Turnout		6,386	–	–
Eligible voters		–		
Saskatchewan hold		Swing		–
Source: Elections Saskatchewan

=== 2016 ===
2016 Saskatchewan general election
Party	Candidate	Votes	%	±%
Saskatchewan	Terry Dennis	4,318	67.46	-3.69
New Democratic	Theresa Wilson	1,323	20.67	-6.31
Progressive Conservative	Merv Malischewski	414	6.46	-
Liberal	Kyle Budz	192	3.00	-
Green	Rachel Gregoire	102	1.59	-0.28
Western Independence	David Sawkiw	51	0.79	-
Total valid votes		6,400	100.0	
Eligible voters		–		
Saskatchewan hold		Swing		+5.00%
Source: Elections Saskatchewan

=== 2011 ===
2011 Saskatchewan general election
Party	Candidate	Votes	%	±%
Saskatchewan	Ken Krawetz	4,371	71.15	+6.66
New Democratic	Rob Carlson	1,657	26.98	–2.92
Green	Jaime Fairley	115	1.87	+0.27
Total valid votes		6,143	100.0	
Saskatchewan hold		Swing		+4.79

=== 2007 ===
2007 Saskatchewan general election
Party	Candidate	Votes	%	±%
Saskatchewan	Ken Krawetz	4,632	64.49	+11.53
New Democratic	Kerry Bewcyk	2,148	29.90	−7.65
Liberal	Duncan May	232	3.23	−4.08
Green	Keith Neu	115	1.60	−
Western Independence	Carl Barabonoff	56	0.78	−1.40
Total valid votes		7,183	100.0	
Saskatchewan hold		Swing		+9.59

=== 2003 ===
2003 Saskatchewan general election
Party	Candidate	Votes	%	±%
Saskatchewan	Ken Krawetz	4,181	52.96	–5.21
New Democratic	Brian Rusnak	2,964	37.55	+9.36
Liberal	Arlene Cote	577	7.31	–4.70
Western Independence	David Sawkiw	172	2.18	+0.55
Total valid votes		7,894	100.0	
Saskatchewan hold		Swing		–7.28

=== 1999 ===
1999 Saskatchewan general election
Party	Candidate	Votes	%	±%
Saskatchewan	Ken Krawetz	4,529	58.17	+17.77
New Democratic	Bill Dodge	2,195	28.19	–11.59
Liberal	Richard McLeod	935	12.01	–28.39
Independent	David Sawkiw	127	1.63	–18.19
Total valid votes		7,786	100.0	
Saskatchewan gain from Liberal		Swing		+34.88

=== 1995 ===
1995 Saskatchewan general election
Party	Candidate	Votes	%
Liberal	Ken Krawetz	3,228	40.40
New Democratic	Bill Dodge	3,178	39.78
Progressive Conservative	David Sawkiw	1,584	19.82
Total valid votes		7,990	100.0
Liberal pickup new district.			

== See also ==
- List of Saskatchewan provincial electoral districts
- List of Saskatchewan general elections
- Canadian provincial electoral districts
