= Rural Municipality of Buchanan No. 304 =

Rural municipality in Saskatchewan, Canada

Buchanan No. 304
- Rural municipality
- Rural Municipality of Buchanan No. 304
- Location of the RM of Buchanan No. 304 in Saskatchewan
- Coordinates: 51.737°N 102.612°W
- Country: Canada
- Province: Saskatchewan
- Census division: 9
- SARM division: 4
- Formed: January 1, 1913

Government
  - Reeve: Don Skoretz
  - Governing body: RM of Buchanan No. 304 Council
  - Administrator: Twila Hadubiak
  - Office location: Buchanan

Area (2016)
  - Land: 738.8 km^{2} (285.3 sq mi)

Population (2016)
  - Total: 301
  - Density: 0.4/km^{2} (1.0/sq mi)
- Time zone: CST
  - Summer (DST): CST
- Area codes: 306 and 639

The Rural Municipality of Buchanan No. 304 (2016 population: 301) is a rural municipality (RM) in the Canadian province of Saskatchewan within Census Division No. 9 and SARM Division No. 4.

== History ==
The RM of Buchanan No. 304 incorporated as a rural municipality on January 1, 1913.

== Geography ==
=== Communities and localities ===
The following urban municipalities are surrounding by the RM.

Villages

- Buchanan

The following unincorporated communities are located in the RM.

Organized hamlets

- Amsterdam
- Tadmore

Localities

- Mitchellview
- Tiny

== Demographics ==
Population history (1981–2016)
Year	Pop.	±%
1981	913	—
1986	809	−11.4%
1991	669	−17.3%
1996	546	−18.4%
2001	506	−7.3%
2006	435	−14.0%
2011	406	−6.7%
2016	301	−25.9%
Source: Statistics Canada via Saskatchewan Bureau of Statistics

In the 2021 Census of Population conducted by Statistics Canada, the RM of Buchanan No. 304 had a population of 330 living in 150 of its 192 total private dwellings, a change of 22.2% from its 2016 population of 270. With a land area of 708.27 km^{2} (273.46 sq mi), it had a population density of 0.5/km^{2} (1.2/sq mi) in 2021.

In the 2016 Census of Population, the RM of Buchanan No. 304 recorded a population of 301 living in 144 of its 214 total private dwellings, a −25.9% change from its 2011 population of 406. With a land area of 738.8 km^{2} (285.3 sq mi), it had a population density of 0.4/km^{2} (1.1/sq mi) in 2016.

== Government ==
The RM of Buchanan No. 304 is governed by an elected municipal council and an appointed administrator that meets on the first Wednesday of every month. The reeve of the RM is Don Skoretz while its administrator is Twila Hadubiak. The RM's office is located in Buchanan.

== See also ==
- List of rural municipalities in Saskatchewan
