= Buchanan, Saskatchewan =

Village in Saskatchewan, Canada

Buchanan
- Village
- Village of Buchanan
- Location of Buchanan in Saskatchewan Buchanan (Canada)
- Coordinates: 51.7013511°N 102.7539806°W
- Country: Canada
- Province: Saskatchewan
- Region: East-central
- Census division: 9
- Rural municipality: Buchanan No. 304
- Post office Founded: 1906
- Incorporated (Village): May 6, 1907

Government
  - Type: Municipal
  - Governing body: Buchanan Village Council
  - Mayor: Darren Godhe
  - Administrator: Keri Gardner

Area
  - Urban: 1.29 km^{2} (0.50 sq mi)
- Elevation: 502 m (1,647 ft)

Population (2021)
  - Village: 237
- Time zone: UTC-6 (CST)
  - Summer (DST): UTC-6 (CST)
- Postal code: S0A 0J0
- Area codes: 306 / 639
- Highways: Highway 5 Highway 47 Highway 754

Buchanan (/bjuːˈkænən/ bew-KAN-ən; 2021 population: 237) is a village in the Canadian province of Saskatchewan within the Rural Municipality of Buchanan No. 304 and Census Division No. 9.

== History ==
Buchanan incorporated as a village on June 11, 1907. The village was named after Robert Buchanan, a local rancher who died in 1919.

== Demographics ==
Population history (1981–2016)
Year	Pop.	±%
1981	392	—
1986	377	−3.8%
1991	338	−10.3%
1996	279	−17.5%
2001	233	−16.5%
2006	225	−3.4%
2011	225	+0.0%
2016	218	−3.1%
Source: Statistics Canada via Saskatchewan Bureau of Statistics

In the 2021 Census of Population conducted by Statistics Canada, Buchanan had a population of 237 living in 121 of its 141 total private dwellings, a change of 8.7% from its 2016 population of 218. With a land area of 1.13 km^{2} (0.44 sq mi), it had a population density of 209.7/km^{2} (543.2/sq mi) in 2021.

In the 2016 Census of Population, the Village of Buchanan recorded a population of 218 living in 106 of its 118 total private dwellings, a −3.2% change from its 2011 population of 225. With a land area of 1.29 km^{2} (0.50 sq mi), it had a population density of 169.0/km^{2} (437.7/sq mi) in 2016.

== Notable people ==
- Lois Hole (1929–2005), Canadian writer, businesswoman, and politician; 15th Lieutenant Governor of Alberta
- Michel Hrynchyshyn, Ukrainian Catholic bishop

== See also ==
- List of communities in Saskatchewan
- List of francophone communities in Saskatchewan
- List of villages in Saskatchewan
