= Canora, Saskatchewan =

Town in Saskatchewan, Canada

Canora
- Town
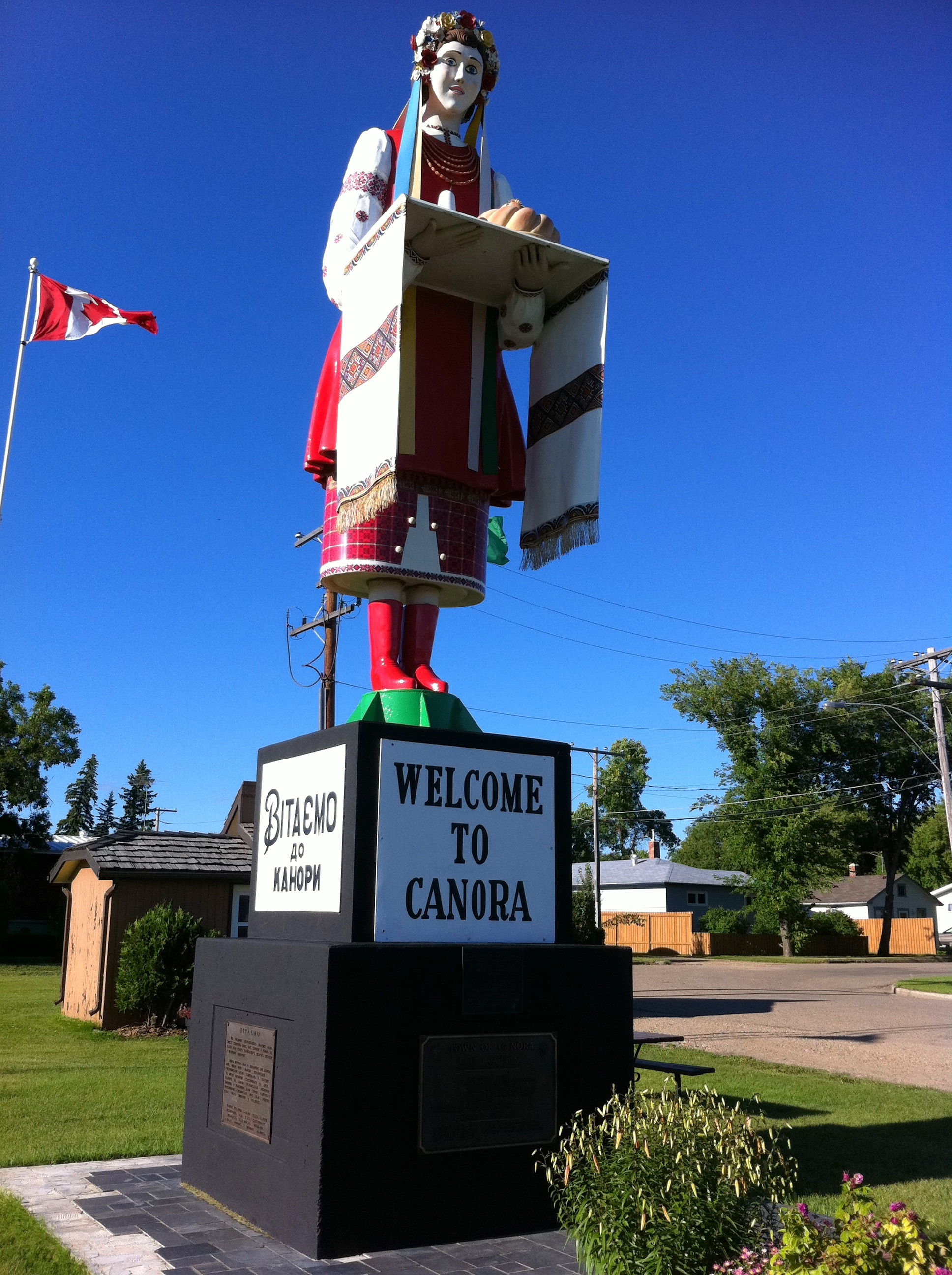
- The "Welcome to Canora" statue, "Lesia"

- Flag
- Motto: "Heart of Good Spirit Country"
- Location within Saskatchewan Location within Canada
- Coordinates: 51°38′02″N 102°26′13″W
- Country: Canada
- Province: Saskatchewan
- Census division: No. 9
- Rural municipality: Good Lake No. 274
- Post office founded: 1904
- Incorporated (village): 1905
- Incorporated (town): 1910

Government
  - Type: Mayor
  - Town manager: Michael Mykytyshyn
  - Governing body: Canora Town Council
  - MP, Yorkton—Melville: Cathay Wagantall (2015)
  - MLA, Canora-Pelly: Sean Wilson (2024)

Area
  - Total: 7.35 km^{2} (2.84 sq mi)
- Elevation: 487 m (1,598 ft)

Population (2021)
  - Total: 2,092
  - Density: 284.6/km^{2} (737/sq mi)
- Time zone: UTC-6 (CST)
  - Summer (DST): UTC-6 (CST)
- Postal code: S0A 0L0
- Area codes: 306/639
- Highways: Highway 5 / Highway 9
- Railways: Canadian National (freight), Via Rail (passenger)
- Waterways: Whitesand River Assiniboine River
- Website: Canora.com

Canora is a town at the junction of Highways 5 and 9 in east-central Saskatchewan, about 50 kilometres (31 mi) north of Yorkton. It is centrally located on the corners of four adjacent rural municipalities, including the RM of Good Lake. The community is home to approximately 2,000 residents and is part of the Canora-Pelly electoral district. The community was founded along the Canadian Northern Railway tracks — one of the companies that evolved into the Canadian National Railway (CN), and two CN freight lines (one east-west branch line to Saskatoon and one line going north) still run through Canora. The Canora railway station, downtown on the CN east-west line before the switch to the northbound line, is served by Via Rail on its passenger service from Winnipeg to Churchill, Manitoba. As of 2016, 53% of the town's residents are either from Ukraine or of Ukrainian descent, with the language still widely spoken in the community.

Canora became a village in 1905 and was incorporated as a town in 1910.

== Demographics ==
In the 2021 Census of Population conducted by Statistics Canada, Canora had a population of 2,092 living in 981 of its 1,123 total private dwellings, a change of 3.4% from its 2016 population of 2,024. With a land area of 7.35 km^{2} (2.84 sq mi), it had a population density of 284.6/km^{2} (737.2/sq mi) in 2021.

Canada census – Canora community profile

	2021	2011
Population	2,092 (–3.4% from 2016)	2219 (10.2% from 2006)
Land area	7.35 km^{2} (2.84 sq mi)	7.31 km^{2} (2.82 sq mi)
Population density	284.7/km^{2} (737/sq mi)	303.7/km^{2} (787/sq mi)
Median age	48.8 (M: 46.0, F: 50.8)	52.1 (M: 50.3, F: 53.7)
Private dwellings	1,123 (total) 981 (occupied)	1166 (total)
Median household income	$56,800

References: 2021 2011

=== Ethnicity ===
Panethnic groups in the Town of Canora (2001–2021)
Panethnic group	2021		2016		2006		2001	
Panethnic group	Pop.	%	Pop.	%	Pop.	%	Pop.	%
European	1,685	85.1%	1,780	90.59%	1,870	97.14%	2,045	96.92%
Indigenous	190	9.6%	125	6.36%	15	0.78%	65	3.08%
Southeast Asian	65	3.28%	25	1.27%	0	0%	0	0%
South Asian	10	0.51%	15	0.76%	0	0%	0	0%
African	0	0%	0	0%	0	0%	0	0%
East Asian	30	1.52%	20	1.02%	40	2.08%	0	0%
Middle Eastern	0	0%	0	0%	0	0%	0	0%
Latin American	0	0%	0	0%	0	0%	0	0%
Other/multiracial	0	0%	0	0%	0	0%	0	0%
Total responses	1,980	94.65%	1,965	97.08%	1,925	95.63%	2,110	95.91%
Total population	2,092	100%	2,024	100%	2,013	100%	2,200	100%
Note: Totals greater than 100% due to multiple origin responses

Major ethnic groups in Canora, Saskatchewan, 2021
Ethnic group	Population	Percent
Ukrainian	850	42%
Polish	385	19%
German	345	17%
English	305	15.1%
Scottish	260	12.8%
Norwegian	215	10.6%
First Nations/Métis	195	9.6%
French	115	5.7%
Total respondent population	2,025	100%
Note: Totals greater than 100% due to multiple origin responses

== History ==
The area around Canora was first settled by Europeans in the late 19th century by Doukhobors, Romanians, and Ukrainians. The first ranchers arrived in the area in 1884. Two years later, in 1886, the land was officially surveyed by the Dominion government. The first Ukrainian block settlement in Saskatchewan was established in 1897 when 150 families arrived in the Canora District from Western Ukraine. In 1904, the Canadian Northern Railway laid tracks through the area and in April of that same year, a post office was opened, a school district established, and a town site was surveyed. A year later, in 1905, Canora was incorporated as a hamlet on the site of the train station, which now serves as the town's museum and tourist information centre. In 1908, Canora became a village. The name Canora is derived from the first two letters of the words "Canadian Northern Railway." By 1910, with a growing population of around 400, Canora had officially achieved the status of a town. In 1912, the first Canora Chamber of Commerce was established. Over the next few decades, the community experienced rapid growth with population levels remaining stable even through the Great Depression. Canora's population peaked in 1966 with about 2,734 residents.

Historical population

Year	Pop.	±%
1906	169	—
1911	435	+157.4%
1921	1,230	+182.8%
1931	1,179	−4.1%
1941	1,200	+1.8%
1951	1,563	+30.2%

Year	Pop.	±%
1961	2,117	+35.4%
1966	2,737	+29.3%
1981	2,667	−2.6%
1991	2,381	−10.7%
2001	2,200	−7.6%
2011	2,219	+0.9%

== Doukhobor Trading Company ==
Doukhobors in Canora were key to the town's development and, under the auspices of the Doukhobor Trading Company, undertook an ambitious building program on Second Avenue East, where they established several communally-run enterprises from 1907 to 1918.5

== Attractions ==
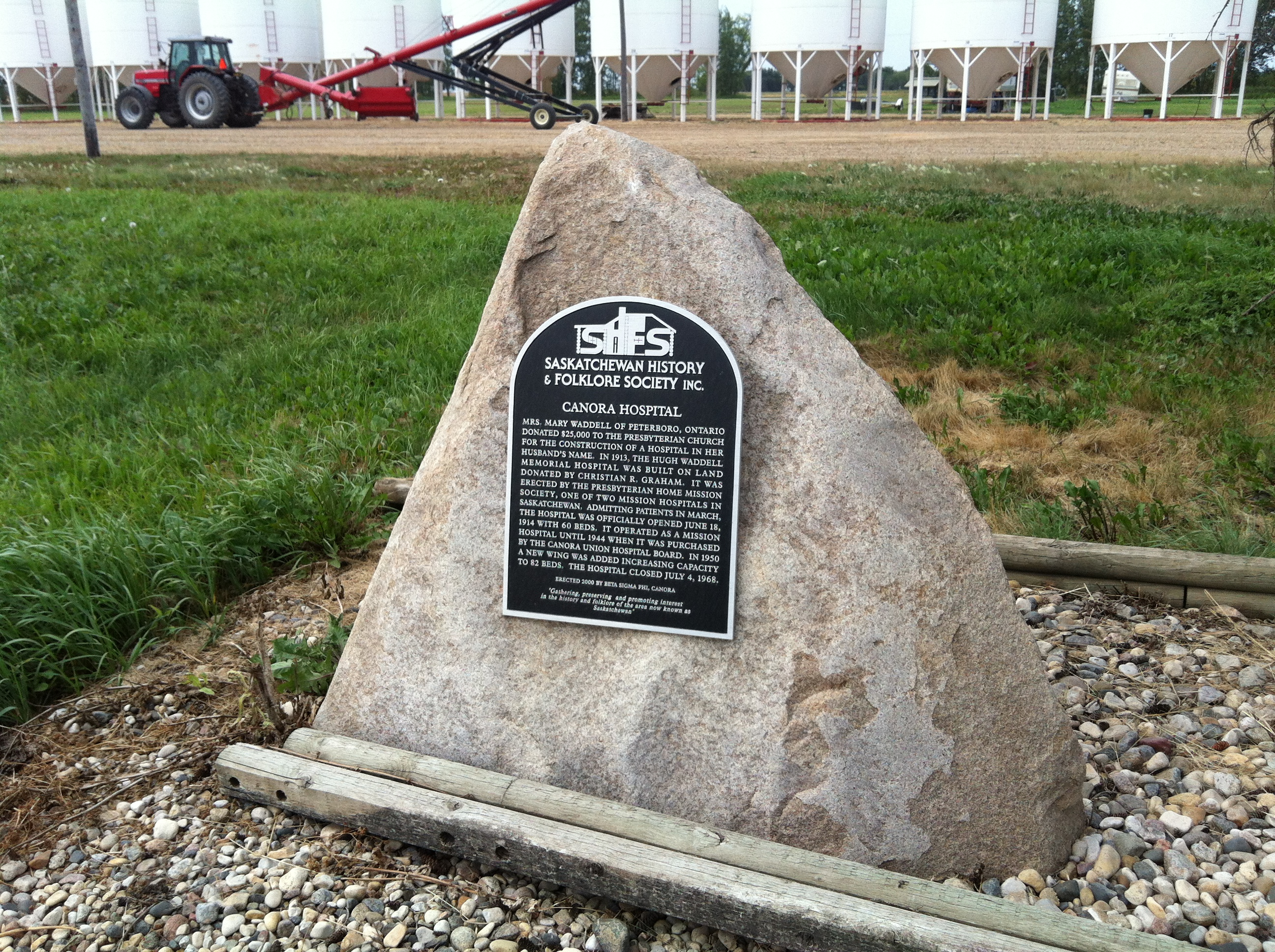
A historical marker for the old Canora Hospital

Canora has several community parks, walking trails, a junior Olympic-sized outdoor swimming pool, Civic Centre, the Sylvia Fedoruk Centre, Sports Service Centre, Sports Grounds, a golf course/activity centre, a tennis court, and a skate park.

Canora is known as the "Heart of Good Spirit Country" as a result of its proximity to several lakes and parks, including Crystal Lake, Good Spirit Lake, and Duck Mountain Provincial Park. The area is home to Saskatchewan's greatest number of golf courses per-capita and has one of the highest tee traffic counts in the province.

Lesia Statue

The Lesia Statue is a 25-foot, 4,000 lb statue that honours the descendants of the Ukrainian and Eastern European settlers who made Canora their home and serves as welcome sign to visitors. The plaque on the base of the statue reads:

The Lesia statue was created in 1979 by Canora residents Nicholas and Orest Lewchuk and took over a year to complete. The statue features a woman dressed in traditional Ukrainian costume, who is offering visitors "bread-salt" — a loaf of braided bread, called Kolach along with salt. For local Ukrainians and many cultures, bread is a highly respected food, and salt is viewed as a symbol of a long, enduring friendship. As part of a customary greeting, a loaf of bread, crowned with a salt cellar is set upon an embroidered ritual cloth. Guests are then offered a chunk of bread to dip into the salt. Lesia was officially unveiled on September 3, 1980 by Right Honorable Edward Schreyer, Governor General of Canada to honour Saskatchewan's 75th anniversary.

Ukrainian Heritage Museum

Canora's Ukrainian Heritage Museum explores all aspects of Ukrainian culture including history, arts folklore. Displays include exhibits of early settlers' artifacts from the area, books by renowned Ukrainian writers, Ukrainian regional costumes and embroideries, as well as traditional Ukrainian arts and crafts, culinary arts and festive events. The museum is run by volunteers and includes a small gift shop.

Station House Museum

Canora's Visitor Information Centre and the CN Station House Museum is located in the oldest Class 3 railway station still operating in Saskatchewan. It was erected in 1904 and its exhibits include displays of CN Rail memorabilia, pioneer artifacts, local art and souvenirs. Information regarding rail tours to Churchill, Manitoba is available at the museum with Via Rail service to Winnipeg and Churchill available twice weekly.

Toy & Autograph Museum

Canora is home to Canada's Only Toy & Autograph Museum. The museum features a one-of-a-kind collection of over 1,000 toys and autographed photos including Stephen Harper as well as Laurel and Hardy.

Holy Trinity Ukrainian Orthodox Heritage Church

A Municipal Heritage Property and Ukrainian Orthodox church that was originally constructed in 1928. The heritage value of Holy Trinity Ukrainian Greek Orthodox Church resides in its connection with the congregation. Desiring to continue their cultural and spiritual practices in their adopted homeland, a Ukrainian Greek Orthodox parish was organised here in 1919. A desire to have their own place of worship led to the construction of this church in 1928. Although the parish built a larger church in 1963, this church is still periodically used and remains a landmark in the community. The heritage value of Holy Trinity Ukrainian Greek Orthodox Church also lies in its Byzantine architecture. Designed by Temish Pavlychenko, the form, particularly the three domes set atop towers, are inspired by the Ukrainian Greek Orthodox Churches of Kiev. The interior is ornately decorated in the Byzantine tradition. Installed in 1944, the iconostasis is richly decorated with Ukrainian Orthodox iconography. The church closed in 1963, was designated a heritage site in 1984, and underwent a major restoration that was completed in 2000.

Hugh Waddell Memorial (Canora Hospital) Site

Hugh Waddell Memorial is a cairn dedicated to Canora's first hospital. Mary Waddell of Peterborough, Ont., donated $25,000 to the Presbyterian Church for construction of a hospital in her husband's name. In 1913, the Hugh Waddell Memorial Hospital was built on land donated by Christian R. Graham. It was erected by the Presbyterian Home Mission Society, one of two mission hospitals in Saskatchewan. Admitting patients in March, the hospital was officially opened on June 18, 1914, with 60 beds. It operated as a mission hospital until 1944 when it was purchased by the Canora Union Hospital Board. In 1950, a new wing was added, increasing its capacity to 82 beds. The hospital closed on July 4, 1968, and a commemorative cairn was erected in 2000.

Trails

Canora has more than 150 km of trails, including over 144 km of marked and groomed snowmobile trails and more than 10 km of walking, cycling, jogging, and cross-country ski trails. Trail surfaces vary from pavement to gravel and even include a foot bridge. These trails include; the Trans Canada Snowmobile Trail, with over ninety miles of signed and groomed trails in the immediate area and access to numerous other snowmobile trails, the Trans Canada Trail, which leads to out-of-town attractions. Heading west is Good Spirit Lake Provincial Park, Burgis Beach, and Canora Beach. Travelling east is Duck Mountain Lake Provincial Park and the National Doukhobor Heritage Village. The Urban Habitat Trail that was created by the River Ridge Wildlife Club and formed in-cooperation with the town of Canora, Ducks Unlimited Canada and the PFRA. This trail is an educational and interpretive trail that highlights the natural habitat, wildlife and plant species of the area. The 8.6 km long Walking Trail that winds through Canora's natural landscape.

Nicholas Lewchuk Property

The Nicholas Lewchuk Property is a Municipal Heritage Property that features a house, a Ferris wheel, an airplane swing and two midway trailers. The Lewchuk family emigrated from Ukraine when Nicholas was a child and homesteaded near Canora in 1902. Lewchuk's eclectic interests came to include vaudeville, publishing, magic, photography, design, recording, and horticulture. In the 1920s, he founded a travelling vaudeville show and carnival that toured the prairies and western Ontario for the next five decades. Lewchuk designed and built the carnival rides himself, the "airplane swing" being the first. Around 1908, Lewchuk's father built the house and Nicholas lived here during the "off-season" for most of his life. From an office off the main entrance, he wrote and edited English and Ukrainian periodicals and ran the seed catalogue business founded by his mother. In 1968 the rides, trailers, and animal pens from the travelling carnival were set up permanently in the yard behind the house. Known as the "Fun Spot", Lewchuk operated his midway intermittently for the next few years. Lewchuk continued his publishing, editing, and horticultural activities intermittently until his death in 1990.

Canora Attractions Gallery

Canora Civic Centre

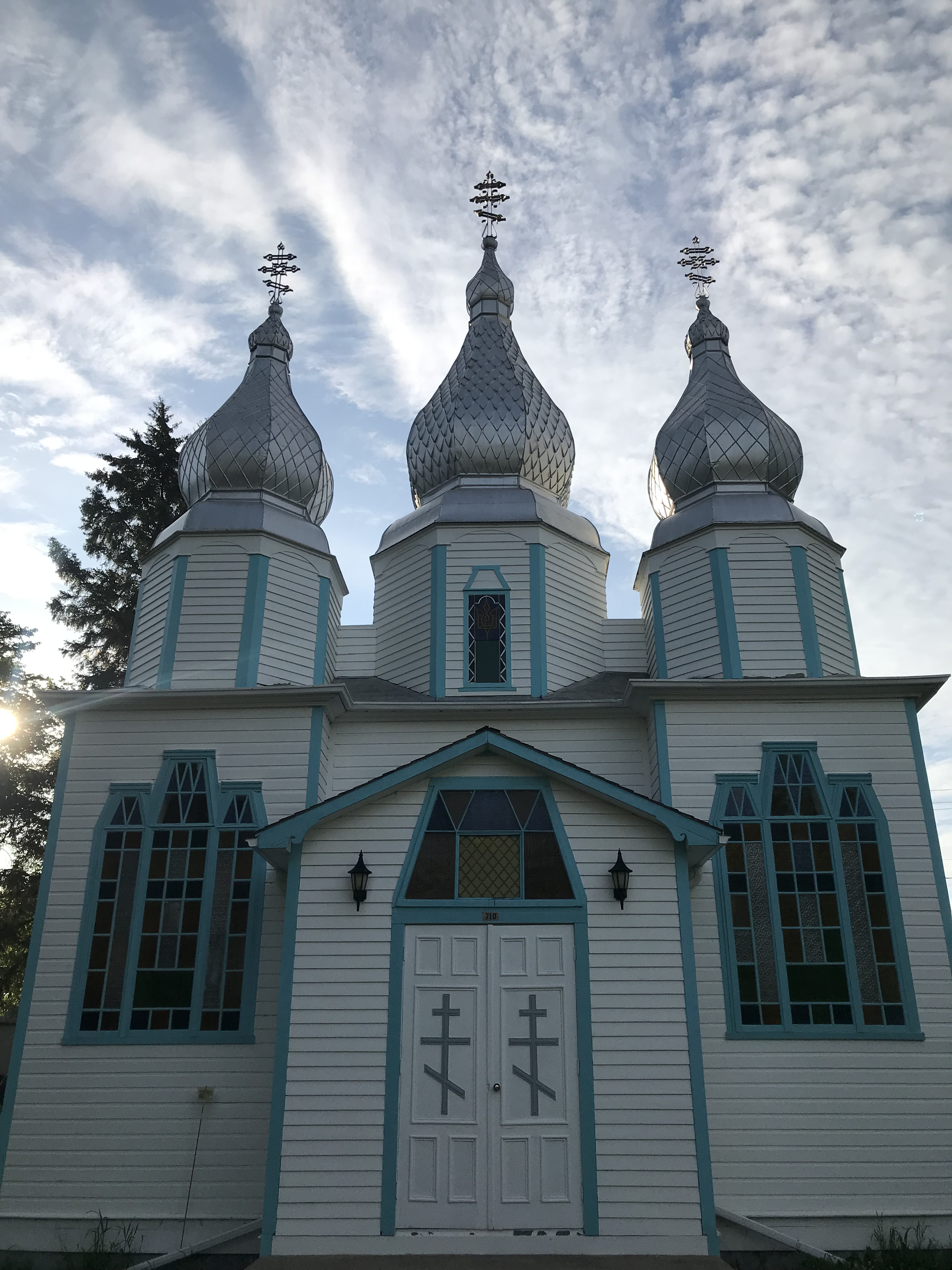
Holy Trinity Ukrainian Orthodox Heritage Church

Lesia Statue

Sylvia Fedoruk Centre

Canora town office

Toy and Autograph Museum

Ukrainian Museum

Train Station, Museum, Visitor Centre

Marker for one of the many trails in Canora

Plaque highlighting the history of Canora

== Annual events ==
Canora hosts two week-long festivals that celebrate both winter and summer.

Canora in Bloom

Canora's week-long annual summer festival that takes place in July and features family-friendly activities, including pool activities, movie nights, golf nights, an old fashioned picnic with local musicians, and numerous dinners and suppers hosted by local groups and organizations.

=== Winter Lights Festival ===
Canora's week-long annual winter festival that features events such as a family skate with Santa, family movie night, youth events, a children's carnival, an evening parade followed by a community bonfire and fireworks display, as well as numerous dinners hosted by local community groups and organizations.

== Notable people ==
- Sylvia Fedoruk, Saskatchewan's first woman Lieutenant-Governor, was born in Canora in 1927.
- Harry Fain, a lawyer who represented clients such as Elvis Presley, Carey Grant, Lee Majors, Rod Steiger and Ali MacGraw, was born in Canora in 1908.
- Florence Storgoff, a political and Freedomite activist, was born in Canora in 1908.
- Allan McKinnon, a Canadian politician, was born in Canora in 1917.
- Warner Jorgenson, a Canadian politician, was born in Canora in 1918.
- Lorne Kopelchuk, a Canadian politician, was born in Canora in 1938.
- Cliff Koroll, a National Hockey League player and coach and Saskatchewan Sports Hall of Famer was born in Canora in 1946.
- Harold Phillipoff, a National Hockey League player, was raised in Canora.
- Tyler Wright, a National Hockey League player and coach, was born in Canora in 1973.
- Terry Dennis, a Saskatchewan politician, was born in Canora.

== Protective services ==
Canora is protected by the Canora-Sturgis RCMP detachment. The detachment has 8 members, between Canora and Sturgis.

Canora and area is served by a full-time Ambulance service — consisting of 3 PCP's, 3 ICP's, and two ACP's.

Canora's fire protection is provided by 21 professionally trained and certified paid-per-call staff. Along with fire protection they also provide rescue services such as vehicle extrication. Their services are also utilised in surrounding Rural Municipalities.

== Transportation ==
Canora is located at the junction of the east–west Highway 5 and the north–south Highway 9. The town also serves as a hub for two freight lines of the Canadian National Railway. The downtown Canora railway station is served by Via Rail passenger service as a stop on the Winnipeg–Churchill train.

== See also ==
- List of communities in Saskatchewan
- List of towns in Saskatchewan
- SS Canora
