= 1st Saskatchewan Legislature =

Canadian government assembly

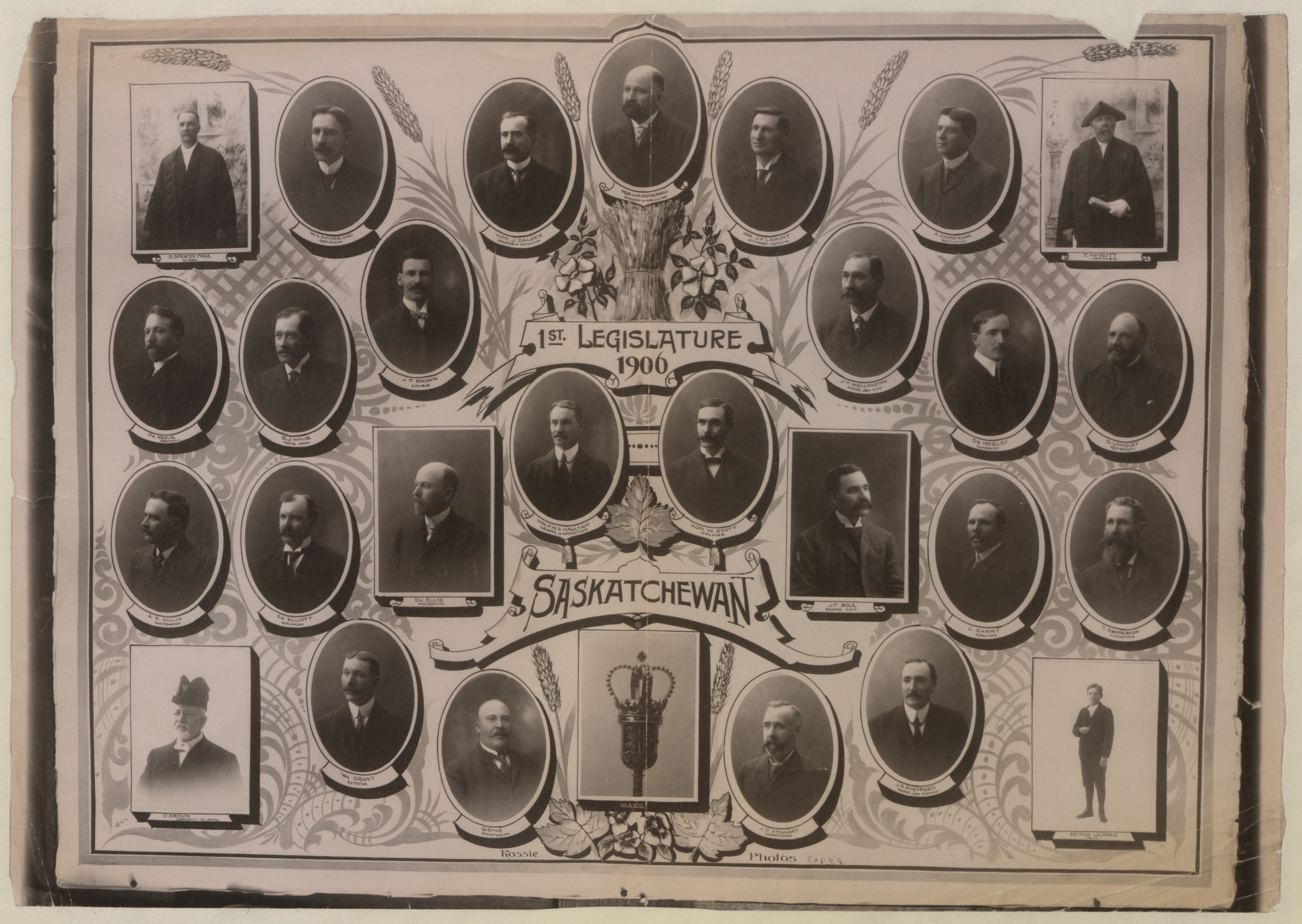
First Legislature, 1906, Saskatchewan. Edgar C. Rossie, British Library.

The 1st Legislative Assembly of Saskatchewan was elected in the Saskatchewan general election held in December 1905, the first general election for the new province. The assembly sat from March 29, 1906, to July 20, 1908. The Liberal Party led by Walter Scott formed the government. The Provincial Rights Party led by Frederick Haultain formed the official opposition.

James Trimble served as speaker for the assembly.

== Members of the Assembly ==
The following members were elected to the assembly in 1905:

Electoral district	MemberSK	Party	First elected	No.# of term(s)
Batoche	William M. Grant	Liberal	1905	1st term
Battleford	Albert Champagne	Liberal	1905	1st term
Cannington	John Duncan Stewart	Liberal	1905	1st term
Grenfell	Andrew William Argue	Provincial Rights	1905	1st term
Humboldt	David Bradley Neely	Liberal	1905	1st term
Kinistino	Thomas Sanderson	Liberal	1905	1st term
Lumsden	Walter Scott	Liberal	1905	1st term
Maple Creek	David James Wylie	Provincial Rights	1905	1st term
Moose Jaw	John Albert Sheppard	Liberal	1905	1st term
Moose Jaw City	John Henry Wellington	Provincial Rights	1905	1st term
Moosomin	Daniel David Ellis	Provincial Rights	1905	1st term
North Qu'Appelle	William Richard Motherwell	Liberal	1905	1st term
Prince Albert	Peter David Tyerman (Note: On April 2, 1907, by order of the Legislative Assembly, 151 votes recorded for Peter David Tyerman were set aside and Samuel James Donaldson was declared duly elected.)	Liberal	1905	1st term
Prince Albert	Samuel James Donaldson (1907)	Provincial Rights	1907	1st term
Prince Albert City	John Henderson Lamont	Liberal	1905	1st term
Prince Albert City	William Turgeon (1907)	Liberal	1907	1st term
Redberry	George Langley	Liberal	1905	1st term
Regina City	James Franklin Bole	Liberal	1905	1st term
Rosthern	Gerhard Ens	Liberal	1905	1st term
Saltcoats	Thomas MacNutt	Liberal	1905	1st term
Saskatoon	William Charles Sutherland	Liberal	1905	1st term
Souris	James Thomas Brown	Provincial Rights	1905	1st term
South Qu'Appelle	Frederick William Gordon Haultain	Provincial Rights	1905	1st term
South Regina	James Alexander Calder	Liberal	1905	1st term
Whitewood	Archibald Beaton Gillis	Provincial Rights	1905	1st term
Wolseley	William Elliott	Provincial Rights	1905	1st term
Yorkton	Thomas Henry Garry	Liberal	1905	1st term

== Party Standings ==
Affiliation	Members (Note: Adjusted to reflect replacement of a Liberal member by a Provincial Rights member in the riding of Prince Albert)
Liberal	16
Provincial Rights	9
Total	25
Government Majority	7

== By-elections ==
By-elections were held to replace members for various reasons:

Electoral district	Member elected	Party	Election date	Reason
Prince Albert City	William Ferdinand Alphonse Turgeon	Liberal	October 12, 1907	John Henderson Lamont named to Supreme Court of Saskatchewan
