= 1905 Saskatchewan general election =

Canadian provincial election

| ← 1902 (NWT) | 13 December 1905 | 1908 → |

25 seats in the Legislative Assembly of Saskatchewan 13 seats needed for a majority
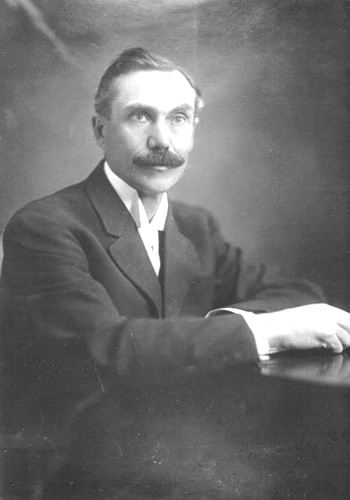

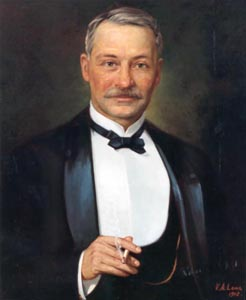
| | First party | Second party |
|---|---|---|
| Leader | Thomas Walter Scott | Frederick W. A. G. Haultain |
| Party | Liberal | Provincial Rights |
| Leader since | 16 August 1905 | 1905 |
| Leader's seat | Lumsden | South Qu'Appelle |
| Seats won | 17* | 8* |
| Popular vote | 17,812 | 16,184 |
| Percentage | 52.25% | 47.47% |
Premier before election
Thomas Walter Scott
Liberal
Premier after election
Thomas Walter Scott
Liberal

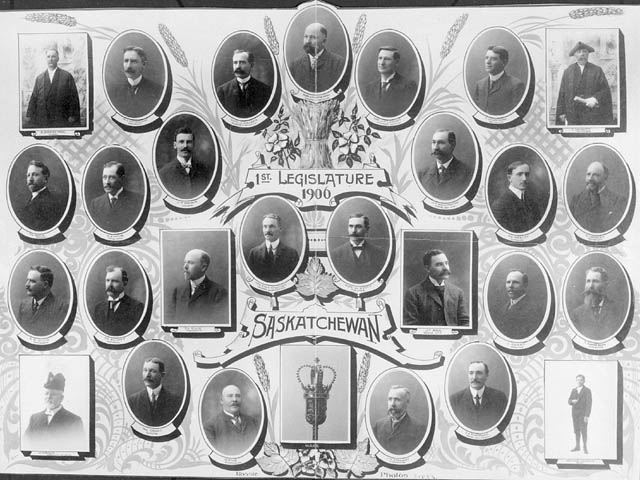
First Legislature, 1906, Saskatchewan

The 1905 Saskatchewan general election was the first provincial election in the newly created Canadian province of Saskatchewan. It was held on 13 December 1905 to elect members of the Legislative Assembly of Saskatchewan. Walter Scott led the Liberal Party of Saskatchewan to victory over the Provincial Rights Party of Frederick W. A. G. Haultain, and became the first Premier of the new province.

| Party | Party Leader | # of candidates | Elected | Popular Vote | |
| Party | Party Leader | # of candidates | Elected | # | % |
|---|---|---|---|---|---|
| Liberal | Walter Scott | 25 | 17* | 17,812 | 52.25% |
| Provincial Rights | Frederick Haultain | 24 | 8* | 16,184 | 47.47% |
| Independent | | 1 | – | 94 | 0.28% |
| Total | | 50 | 25 | 34,090 | 100% |
Source: Elections Saskatchewan

Popular vote
| Liberal | 52.25% |
| Provincial Rights | 47.47% |
| Others | 0.28% |

Seats summary
| Liberal | 68.00% |
| Provincial Rights | 32.00% |

== Members of the Legislative Assembly elected ==
For complete electoral history, see individual districts

1st Saskatchewan Legislative Assembly
| District | Member | Party |
|---|---|---|
| Batoche | William Grant | Liberal |
| Battleford | Albert Champagne | Liberal |
| Cannington | John D. Stewart | Liberal |
| Grenfell | Andrew Argue | Provincial Rights |
| Humboldt | David Neely | Liberal |
| Kinistino | Thomas Sanderson | Liberal |
| Lumsden | Thomas Walter Scott | Liberal |
| Maple Creek | David Wylie | Provincial Rights |
| Moose Jaw | John Sheppard | Liberal |
| Moose Jaw City | John Wellington | Provincial Rights |
| Moosomin | Daniel Ellis | Provincial Rights |
| North Qu'Appelle | William Richard Motherwell | Liberal |
| Prince Albert | Peter Tyerman^{*} | Liberal |
| Prince Albert City | John Henderson Lamont | Liberal |
| Redberry | George Langley | Liberal |
| Regina City | James Bole | Liberal |
| Rosthern | Gerhard Ens | Liberal |
| Saltcoats | Thomas MacNutt | Liberal |
| Saskatoon | William C. Sutherland | Liberal |
| Souris | James T. Brown | Provincial Rights |
| South Qu'Appelle | Frederick Haultain | Provincial Rights |
| South Regina | James Alexander Calder | Liberal |
| Whitewood | Archibald Gillis | Provincial Rights |
| Wolseley | William Elliot | Provincial Rights |
| Yorkton | Thomas Garry | Liberal |

Note:

^{*}In 1907 by order of the Legislative Assembly Samuel Donaldson of the Provincial Rights party was declared elected and Peter Tyerman lost his seat.

== See also ==
- List of political parties in Saskatchewan
- List of Saskatchewan provincial electoral districts
