= Saskatchewan Act =

Foundational law for province of Saskatchewan

Saskatchewan Act Loi sur la Saskatchewan

Part of the Constitution of Canada
- Long title: An Act to establish and provide for the Government of the Province of Saskatchewan
- Citation: SC 1905, c. 42; RSC 1985, App. II, No. 18
- Territorial extent: Saskatchewan; Canada
- Enacted by: Parliament of Canada
- Assented to by: Edward VII
- Assented to: July 20, 1905
- Commenced: September 1, 1905
- Status: Amended

The Saskatchewan Act (French: Loi sur la Saskatchewan) is one of enactments which make up the Constitution of Canada. It established the new province of Saskatchewan, effective September 1, 1905. The act received royal assent on July 20, 1905.

== Creation ==
From 1870 to 1905, the region which is now Saskatchewan was part of the North-West Territories, established by the Parliament of Canada. As the population of the North-West Territories increased, its government evolved from an appointed lieutenant governor in 1876, to responsible government in 1897, to near full provincial powers, with the exception of direct taxation by 1901. However, with the Government of Canada failing to cover the full expenses of the territories, Premier Frederick Haultain requested provincial status for a large swathe of the territories.

The initial proposal by the Conservative Haultain to Liberal Prime Minister Wilfrid Laurier in 1900 was seconded by Liberal James Ross, and was taken under consideration by Clifford Sifton, Minister of the Interior. Haultain desired that the entire area between Manitoba and British Columbia be incorporated as a single province, due to the region's shared history and economy. Others supported splitting the area into two or more separate provinces based on the existing provisional districts, for fear a single province would be unwieldy, and that it might come to dominate federal politics. The Laurier government postponed any decision until after the 1904 election, during which Haultain actively campaigned for the Conservatives. The Conservatives lost to Laurier's Liberals, and following the election, the Liberals decided to create two provinces, Saskatchewan and Alberta.

Two sections in the act as passed caused significant controversy: section 17, which constitutionally entrenched the existing rights of the religious minority in each school district, whether Roman Catholic or Protestant, to establish publicly funded separate schools, with no discrimination in public funding against the separate schools, and section 21, which reserved management of public lands and natural resources to the Government of Canada.

Section 17 was controversial because the issue of religious instruction also paralleled language issues, as Protestants were mainly anglophones, and most francophones were Roman Catholic. English Canadians felt that immigrants should be assimilated into the British culture and language, while French Canadians saw any removal of existing protections as an attack on the French culture. Clifford Sifton resigned rather than support the initial draft of this provision, which he considered to be expanding the rights then in force under the territorial law. A modified version of section 17 was included in the act despite the protests and Sifton's resignation.

Section 21 allowed the Government of Canada to retain control over the public lands and natural resources in the new province, unlike the situation in the older provinces, which had control over their public lands and natural resources. While the act provided for monetary transfers to compensate for the lack of resource revenue, this policy hindered the economic growth of the new province and became one of the original sources of western alienation. Haultain formed a protest party, the Provincial Rights Party, based around this issue. The province finally obtained control over natural resources in 1930, with the passage of the Natural Resources Acts and the Constitution Act, 1930. This issue was again clarified in the Constitution Act, 1982.

The Alberta Act was passed at the same time as the Saskatchewan Act, creating the new province of Alberta. At the time, the two acts were often referred to as the "Autonomy Acts." The provisions of the two acts are very similar.

== Sections of the act ==
The act consists of the following sections (paraphrased):

1. Provides the shortened name of the act.
2. Describes the physical boundaries of the province.
3. Constitution Act, 1867 applies to Saskatchewan.
4. Four members appointed to the Senate of Canada.
5. Current representation in the House of Commons will remain in effect until the next election.
6. Sets the number of Members of Parliament members based on population.
7. Election guidelines of the Northwest Territories applies to the province until amended by Parliament.
8. Lieutenant governor determines members of the Executive Council.
9. Seat of government is Regina.
10. Powers of the lieutenant governor of the Northwest Territories shall be same as those of the lieutenant governor in Saskatchewan.
11. Lieutenant governor shall provide a Great Seal for the new province.
12. The single house of the provincial legislature to be named the Legislative Assembly of Saskatchewan.
13. Initially 25 members of the provincial legislature until changed by said legislature. A schedule followed the main body of the act that defined the initial electoral divisions for the province.
14. Current laws of the Northwest Territories shall apply to Saskatchewan.
15. The first general election must be called within six months.
16. Laws and courts: Supreme Court of the Northwest Territories may be abolished in Saskatchewan if replaced by a similar court.
17. Amended section 93 of the Constitution Act, 1867 as it applies in Saskatchewan; rights of Roman Catholics and Protestants to separate schools continued.
18. Subsidies from the federal government based on a fixed amount and population size.
19. Annual payments of $405 375 to Saskatchewan from the federal government.
20. Compensation for use of public lands by the federal government.
21. Existing federal lands, mines and minerals will remain the property of the federal government.
22. Properties and assets of the Northwest Territories to be divided equally between Saskatchewan and Alberta.
23. Preserves the rights of the Hudson's Bay Company with respect to land surrendered to the Crown.
24. Provisions for the Canadian Pacific Railway. Repealed retroactive to August 29, 1966, by the Constitution Amendment, 2022 (Saskatchewan Act).
25. Act comes into effect on September 1, 1905.

== Original electoral divisions ==
The original 25 electoral divisions were defined in a schedule following the main body of the act. These 25 divisions were:

1. Souris
2. Cannington
3. Moosomin
4. Whitewood
5. Grenfell
6. Wolseley
7. Saltcoats
8. Yorkton
9. South Qu'Appelle
10. North Qu'Appelle
11. South Regina
12. Regina City
13. Lumsden
14. Moose Jaw
15. Moose Jaw City
16. Maple Creek
17. Humboldt
18. Kinistino
19. Prince Albert
20. Prince Albert City
21. Batoche
22. Saskatoon
23. Rosthern
24. Redberry
25. Battleford

== See also ==
- Alberta Act
