= Western Canada =

Region of Canada

Western Canada Ouest canadien (French)
- Region
- Western Canada, defined geographically and politically
- Country: Canada
- Composition: British Columbia (BC); Alberta (AB); Saskatchewan (SK); Manitoba (MB)
- Capitals and largest cities: Victoria, Vancouver, BC; Edmonton, Calgary, AB; Regina, Saskatoon, SK; Winnipeg, MB

Area
  - Total: 2,703,159 km^{2} (1,043,696 sq mi)

Population (2021)
  - Total: 11,738,172
  - Density: 4.342391/km^{2} (11.24674/sq mi)

Western Canada, also referred to as the Western provinces, Canadian West, or Western provinces of Canada, and commonly known within Canada as the West, is a Canadian region that includes the four western provinces just north of the Canada–United States border namely (from west to east) British Columbia, Alberta, Saskatchewan, and Manitoba. The people of the region are often referred to as "Western Canadians" or "Westerners", and though diverse from province to province are largely seen as being collectively distinct from other Canadians along cultural, linguistic, socioeconomic, geographic and political lines. They account for approximately 32% of Canada's total population.

The region is further subdivided geographically and culturally between British Columbia, which is mostly on the western side of the Canadian Rockies and often referred to as the "west coast", and the "Prairie Provinces" (commonly known as "the Prairies"), which include those provinces on the eastern side of the Rockies yet west of Ontario: Alberta, Saskatchewan, and Manitoba. Alberta and British Columbia are also sometimes subcategorized together, either as the "Rockies Provinces" or "mountain provinces" owing to both hosting large swathes of the mountain range, or due to shared socioeconomic factors such as their highly urbanized populations (three of Canada's five largest cities are Calgary, Edmonton, and Vancouver) and significant interprovincial mobility between the two. Alberta and Saskatchewan, which were separated from the Northwest Territories at the same time, are also sometimes subcategorized together due to shared political and economic histories, as well as similar historic migratory patterns from Eastern Europe.

== History ==
Numbered Treaties in Canada.

Western Canada is the traditional territory of many Indigenous nations predating the arrival of European colonization. As Britain colonized the West, it established treaties with various First Nations and fought with other nations for control of Western Canada. Numbered Treaties were signed on the prairies between 1871 and 1899, but most of what is now British Columbia was never ceded to the Canadian government. At the time, these treaties were seen by the government and settlers as an easy and less expensive way of taking control of the land and its resources. Land claims are still ongoing.

Most of the first Europeans in the Canadian West were French-Canadian, being either fur traders or settlers.

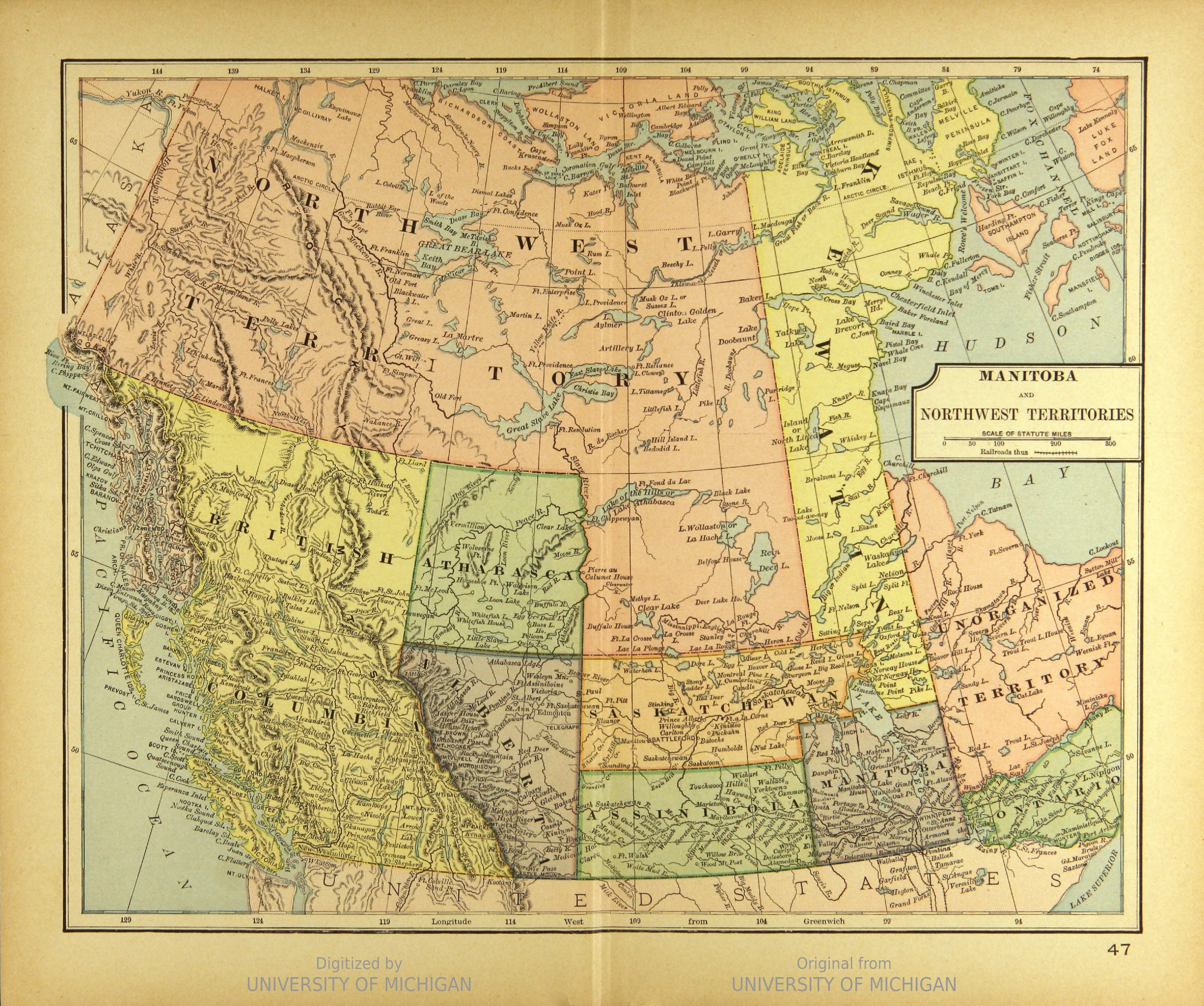
1894 map of Western Canada

In 1858, the British government established the Colony of British Columbia, governing that part of Canada still known as British Columbia. The English government established the Hudson's Bay Company, which controlled most of the current area of Western Canada, northern Ontario and northern Quebec, the area known as Rupert's Land and the North-Western Territory. In 1870, the British government transferred the lands of the company to Canada. The area of Western Canada not within British Columbia was established as the Northwest Territories under Canadian control. The western provinces other than British Columbia were established from areas of the Northwest Territories:

- Manitoba established as a province of Canada in 1870, following the enacting of the Manitoba Act.
- British Columbia: Under terms that Canada would absorb the colony's debt, would begin to subsidize public work, and would begin to construct a railway allowing travel from British Columbia to Ontario, British Columbia agreed to join Canadian Confederation in 1871.
- Saskatchewan: Established as province in 1905, with the implementation of the Saskatchewan Act.
- Alberta: In 1905, the same year as Saskatchewan, Alberta also was established as province. Just like Saskatchewan had the Saskatchewan Act, Alberta had the Alberta Act.

== Demographics ==
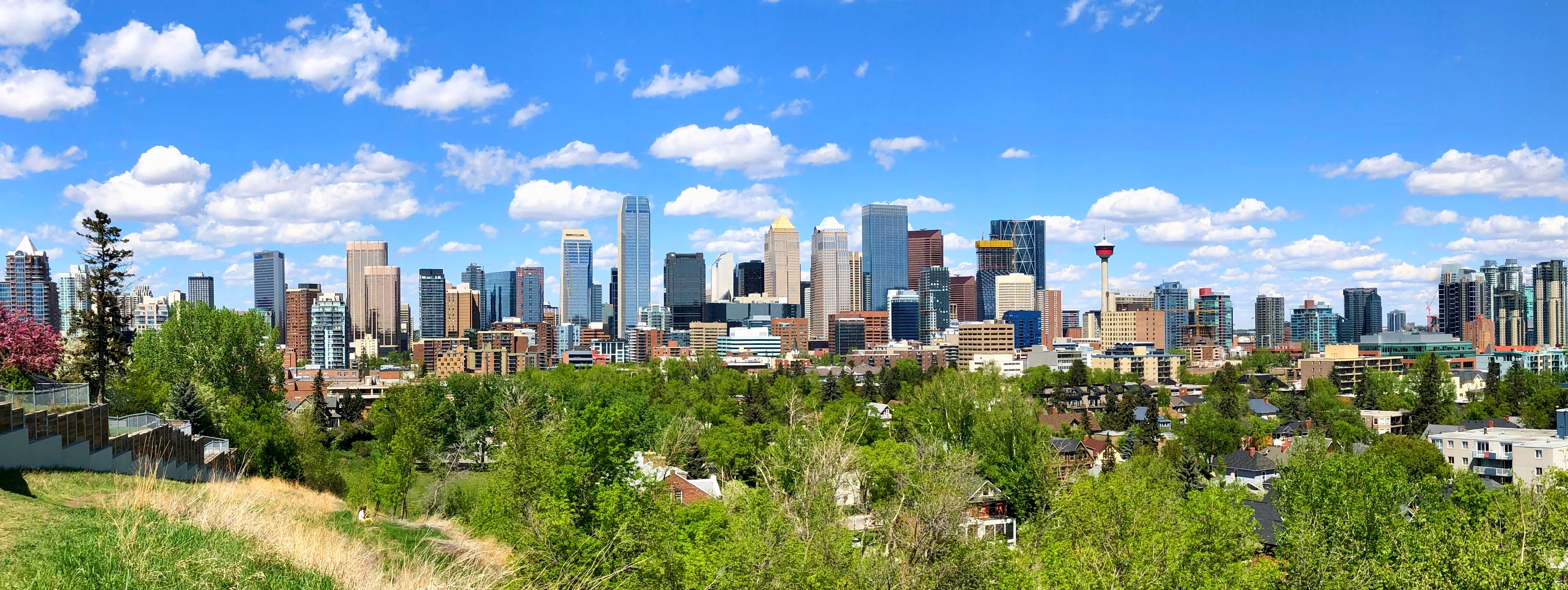
Calgary is the largest municipality by population in Western Canada.

As of the 2021 Canadian census, the total population of Western Canada was 11.7 million, including approximately 5.00 million in British Columbia, 4.26 million in Alberta, 1.13 million in Saskatchewan, and 1.32 million in Manitoba. This represents 31.7% of Canada's population. Vancouver is the largest metropolitan area in Western Canada at over 2.6 million people, while Calgary is largest city proper at over 1.3 million people.

The capital cities of the four western provinces, from west to east, are: Victoria, British Columbia; Edmonton, Alberta; Regina, Saskatchewan; and Winnipeg, Manitoba. With the exception of Winnipeg, all other western provincial capitals are the second-largest metropolitan areas of their respective provinces.

=== Census metropolitan areas ===
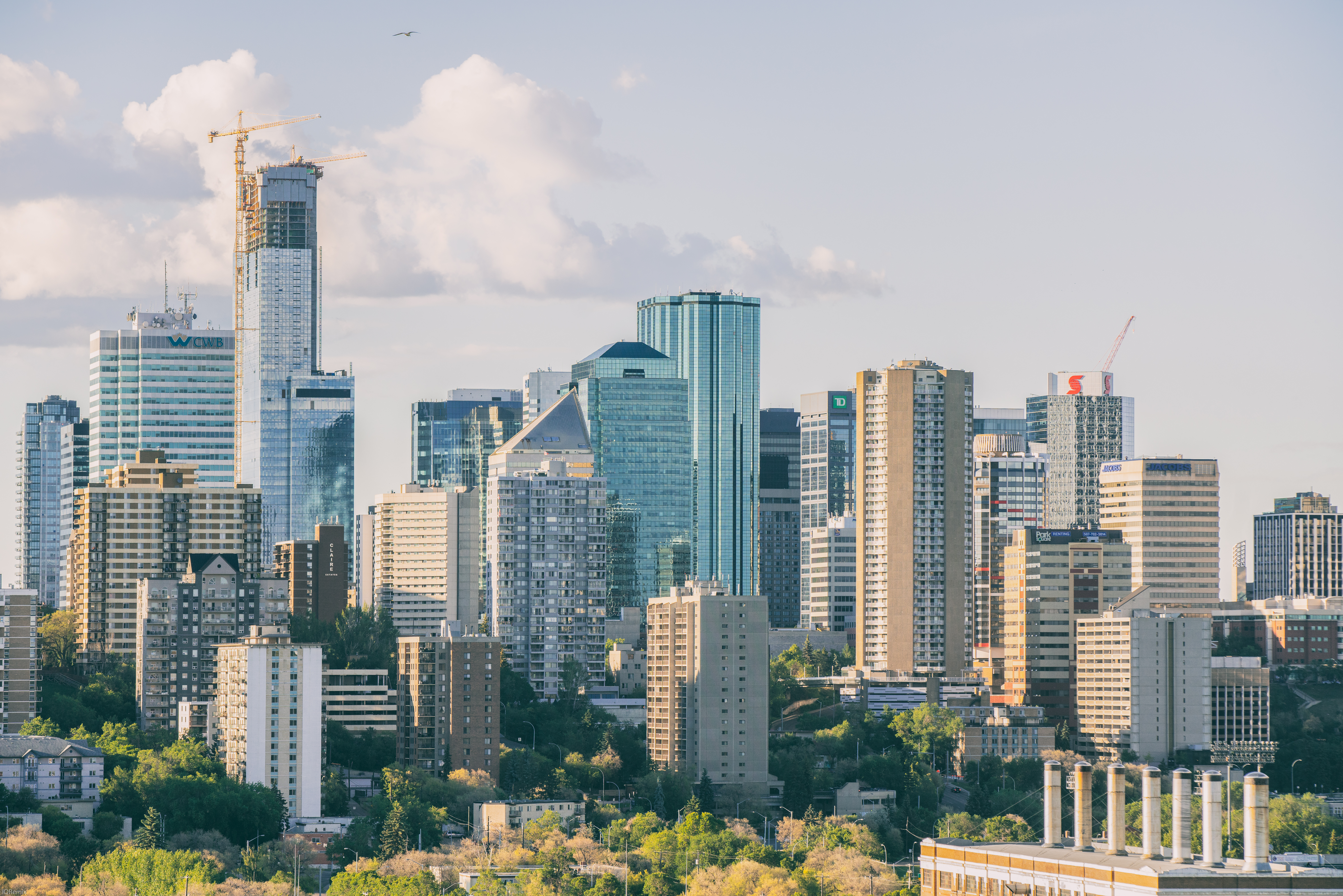
View of Edmonton's central business district in 2018

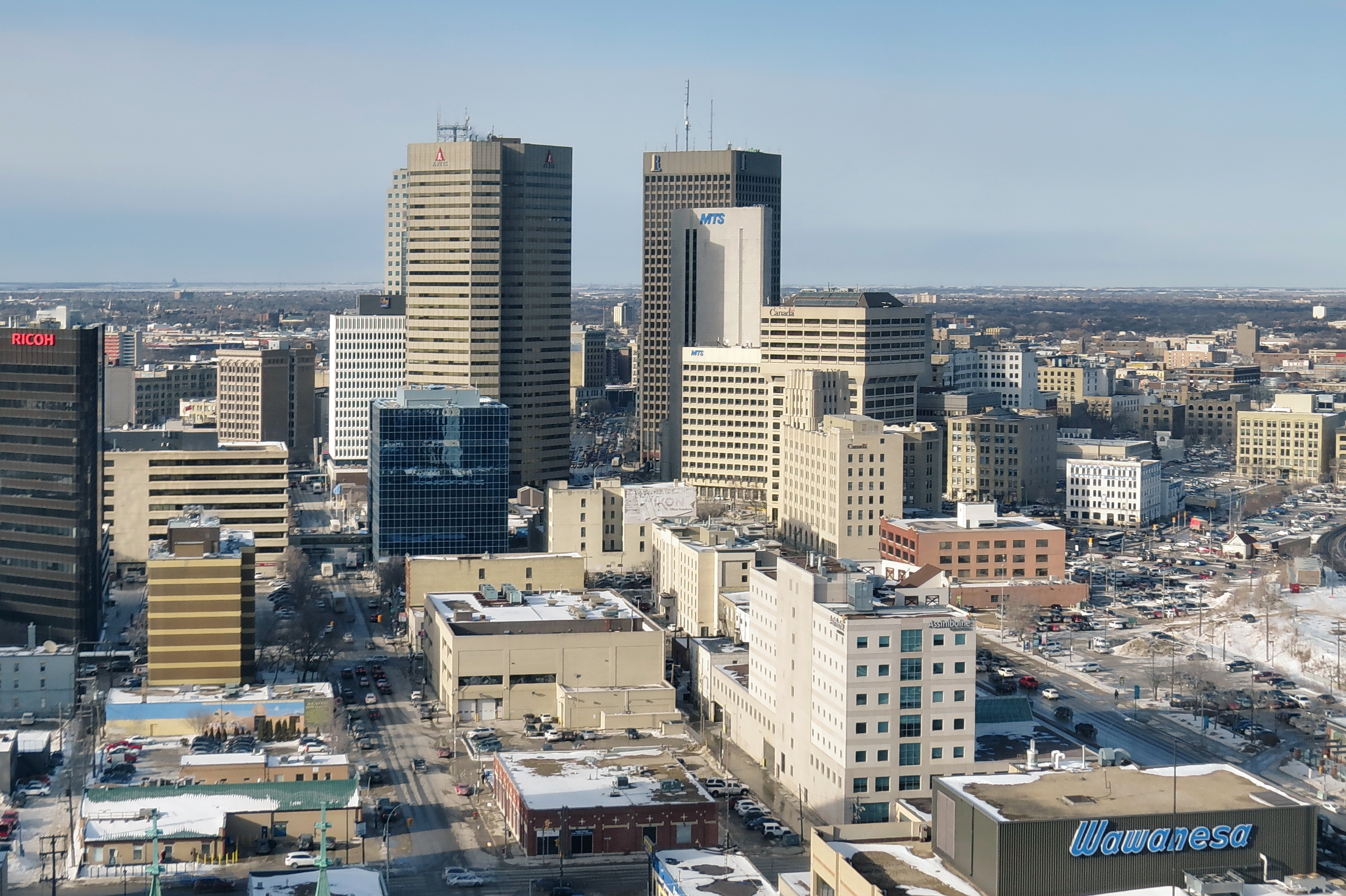
Centred on the intersection of Portage and Main, Downtown Winnipeg is the city's central business district.

As of the 2016 Census, Statistics Canada recognized ten census metropolitan areas within Western Canada, including four in British Columbia, three in Alberta, two in Saskatchewan, and one in Manitoba. The following is a list of these areas and their populations as of 2016.

From 2011 to 2016, the fastest growing CMAs in the country were the five in Alberta and Saskatchewan: Calgary (+14.6%), Edmonton (+13.9%), Saskatoon (+12.5%), Regina (+11.8%) and Lethbridge (+10.8%). These were the only CMAs in the country to register growth over 10%. The three fastest growing CMAs - Calgary, Edmonton, and Saskatoon - were unchanged from the previous intercensal period.

Name	Population (2016)	National rank
Vancouver	2,463,431	3
Calgary	1,392,609	4
Edmonton	1,321,426	6
Winnipeg	778,489	8
Victoria	367,770	15
Saskatoon	295,095	17
Regina	236,481	18
Kelowna	194,882	22
Abbotsford–Mission	180,518	23
Lethbridge	117,394	34

== Geography ==
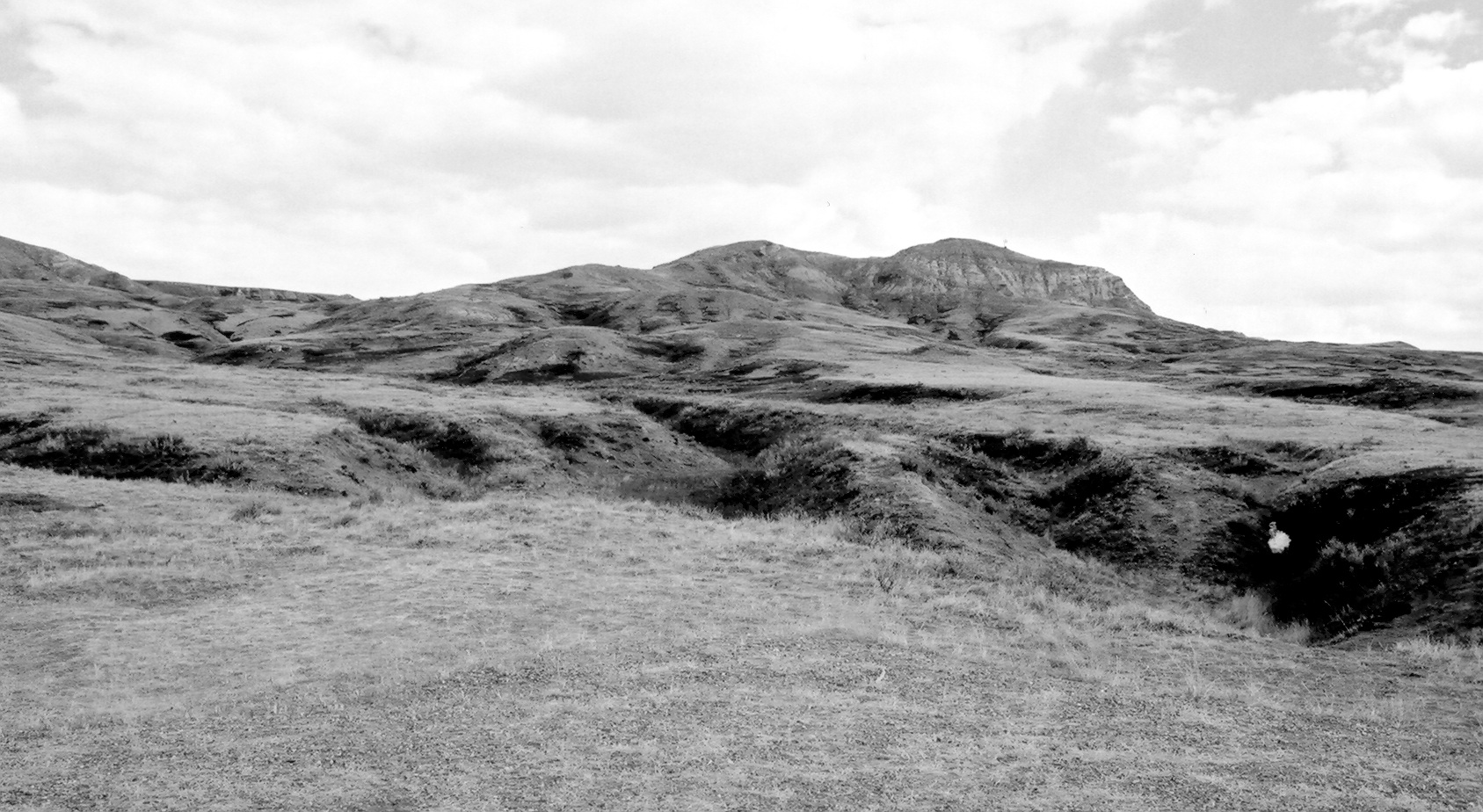
Badlands in Southern Saskatchewan

Western Canada consists of the country's four westernmost provinces: British Columbia, Alberta, Saskatchewan and Manitoba. It covers 2.9 million square kilometres – almost 29% of Canada's land area. British Columbia adjoins the Pacific Ocean to the west, while Manitoba has a coastline on Hudson Bay in its northeast of the province. Both Alberta and Saskatchewan are landlocked between British Columbia and Manitoba.

The Canadian Prairies are part of a vast sedimentary plain covering much of Alberta, southern Saskatchewan, and southwestern Manitoba. The prairies form a significant portion of the land area of Western Canada. The plains generally describes the expanses of largely flat, arable agricultural land which sustain extensive grain farming operations in the southern part of the provinces. Despite this, some areas such as the Cypress Hills and Alberta Badlands are quite hilly and the prairie provinces contain large areas of forest such as the Mid-Continental Canadian forests.

In Alberta and British Columbia, the Canadian Cordillera is bounded by the Rocky Mountains to the east and the Pacific Ocean to the west.

The Canadian Rockies are part of a major continental divide that extends north and south through western North America and western South America. The continental divide also defines much of the border between Alberta and British Columbia. The Columbia and the Fraser Rivers have their headwaters in the Canadian Rockies and are the second- and third-largest rivers, respectively, to drain to the west coast of North America. To the west of their headwaters, across the Rocky Mountain Trench, is a second belt of mountains, the Columbia Mountains, comprising the Selkirk, Purcell, Monashee and Cariboo Mountains sub-ranges.

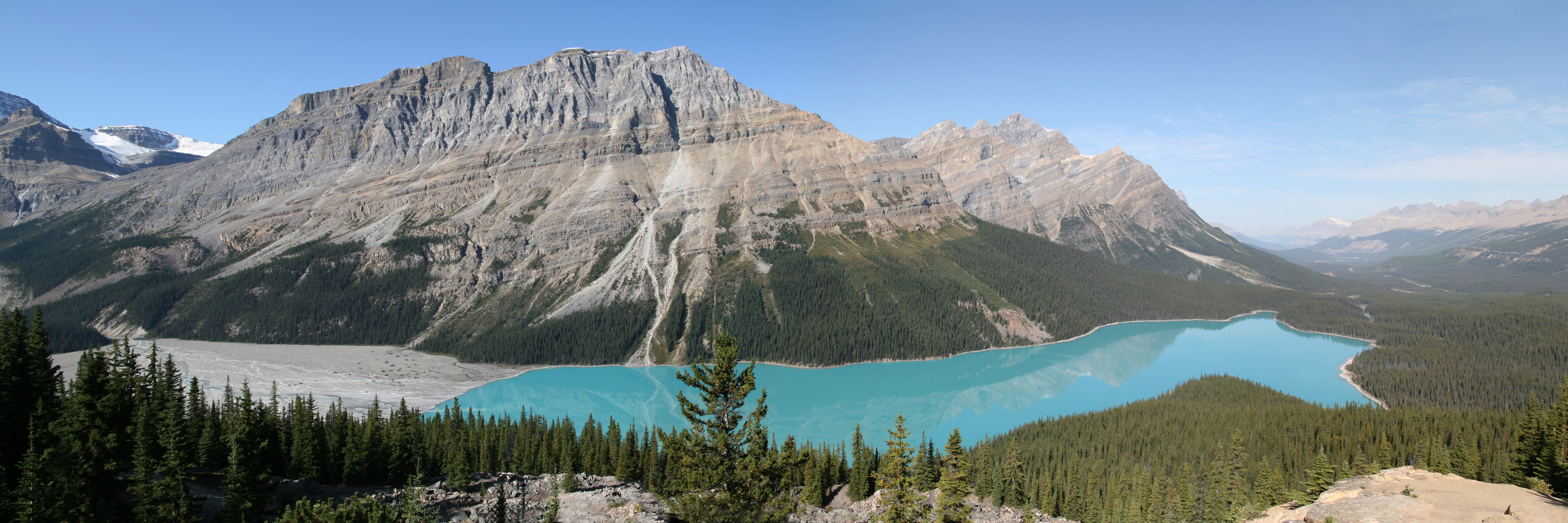
Peyto Lake in Banff National Park, Alberta

=== Climate ===
Köppen climate types in Western Canada

The coast of British Columbia enjoys a moderate oceanic climate because of the influence of the Pacific Ocean. Winters are typically wet and summers relatively dry. These areas enjoy the mildest winter weather in all of Canada, as temperatures rarely fall much below the freezing mark. The mountainous Interior of the province is drier and has colder winters, but experiences hotter summers than the more moderate coastal areas. Lytton, British Columbia, a small town that sits at the confluence of the Thompson River holds the record for the hottest temperature ever recorded in Canada at 49.6 °C (121.3 °F) on June 29, 2021, and is regularly referred as Canada's hot spot in summer with temperatures easily reaching the mid to high 30 °C 's (upper 90s to low 100s °F) in July and August and sometimes top 40 °C (104 °F).

Alberta has a dry continental climate with warm summers and cold winters. The province is open to cold Arctic weather systems from the north, which often produce extremely cold conditions in winter. Winters are generally quite cold, though some areas can experience a phenomenon known as the "Chinook wind", wherein warm winds raise the winter temperatures temporarily. In contrast, summers can fluctuate from cool to hot and are generally wetter.

Saskatchewan and Manitoba have a continental climate and experience extremes in weather. Winters in both provinces can be classified as harsh with Arctic winds and −40 °C (−40 °F) temperatures possible. Winter temperatures in both provinces average between −10 and −15 °C (14 and 5 °F). In contrast, summers can be hot with temperatures exceeding 35 °C (95 °F) at least once per year in most locations.

Average daily maximum and minimum temperatures for 7 largest cities in Western Canada
City	July (°C)	July (°F)	January (°C)	January (°F)
Calgary	23/9	73/48	−1/−13	27/5
Edmonton	23/12	73/54	−6/−14	21/5
Regina	26/11	79/52	−10/−22	14/−8
Saskatoon	25/11	77/52	−12/−22	10/−8
Winnipeg	26/13	79/55	−13/−20	9/−4
Vancouver	22/13	71/54	6/1	43/33
Victoria	22/11	71/51	7/1	44/33

== Politics ==
=== Federal politics ===
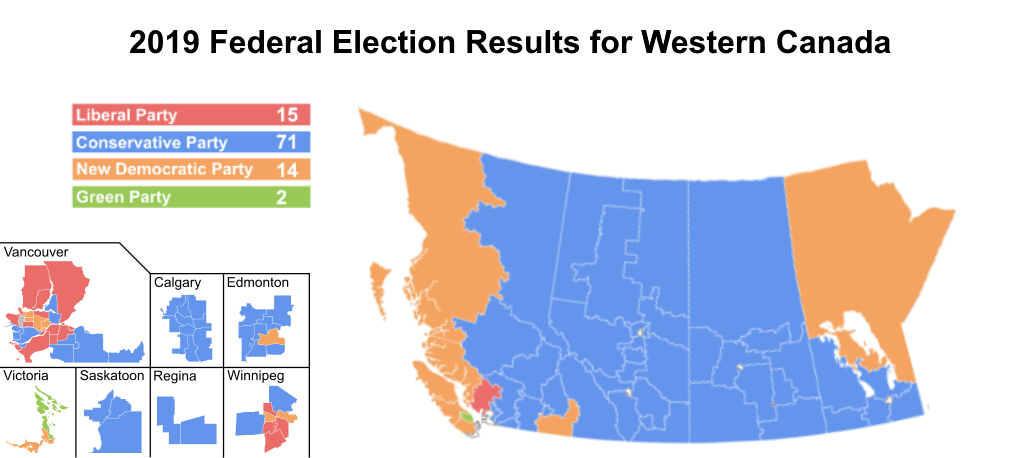
2019 Canadian federal election results by riding for Western Canada

In Canadian politics, Western Canada is currently associated with a general Conservative Party lean, contrasted with a proportionally greater Liberal Party lean in Central and Atlantic Canada. Liberal Party strongholds exist particularly in Greater Vancouver and Winnipeg. The social democratic New Democratic Party had its origins on the Canadian Prairies and in the mining and pulp mill towns and railway camps of British Columbia and has a history of support in Manitoba and British Columbia.

The western provinces are represented in the Parliament of Canada by 108 Members of Parliament (MPs) in the House of Commons (British Columbia 43, Alberta 37, Saskatchewan and Manitoba 14 each) and 24 senators (6 from each province). Currently, of the 108 western MPs in the Commons, 73 are Conservatives, Liberals hold 29 seats, the New Democrats hold 5 and the Greens hold 1.

2025 federal election results for Western Canada
Party name		BC	AB	SK	MB	Total
Liberal	Seats:	20	2	1	6	29
Liberal	Vote:	41.8	27.9	26.6	40.8	–
Conservative	Seats:	19	34	13	7	73
Conservative	Vote:	41.0	63.5	64.6	46.3	–
New Democratic Party	Seats:	3	1	–	1	5
New Democratic Party	Vote:	13.0	6.3	7.6	11.0	–
Green	Seats:	1	–	–	–	1
Green	Vote:	3.0	0.4	0.6	0.7	–
Total seats		43	37	14	14	108

2025 federal election seat results for Western Canada
73	29	5	1
Conservative	Liberal	NDP	G

2021 federal election seat results for Western Canada
64	21	18	1
Conservative	Liberal	New Democratic	G

2019 federal election seat results for Western Canada
71	15	15	2	1
Conservative	Liberal	New Democratic	G	I

2015 federal election seat results for Western Canada
54	29	20	1
Conservative	Liberal	New Democratic	G

2011 federal election seat results for Western Canada
72	15	4	1
Conservative	New Democratic	Lib.	G

2008 federal election seat results for Western Canada
71	14	7
Conservative	New Democratic	Liberal

2006 federal election seat results for Western Canada
65	14	13
Conservative	Liberal	New Democratic

2004 federal election seat results for Western Canada
68	14	9	1
Conservative	Liberal	NDP	I

2000 federal election seat results for Western Canada
64	14	8	2
Canadian Reform Conservative Alliance	Liberal	NDP	P

1997 federal election seat results for Western Canada
60	15	12	1
Reform	Liberal	New Democratic	P

1993 federal election seat results for Western Canada
51	27	8
Reform	Liberal	NDP

1988 federal election seat results for Western Canada
48	32	6
Progressive Conservative	New Democratic	Liberal

1984 federal election seat results for Western Canada
58	17	2
Progressive Conservative	New Democratic	L

1980 federal election seat results for Western Canada
49	26	2
Progressive Conservative	New Democratic	L

==== Western alienation ====
Western alienation refers to the notion that Western Canada has been excluded economically and politically from the rest of Canada. Separatists often believe that Eastern Canada is over-represented politically and receives too much money from equalisation payments. Western alienation dates back to at least 1905, when Alberta and Saskatchewan became provinces but unlike Manitoba were not given control of the resources.

There was a resurgence of these grievances with the election of Justin Trudeau in 2015. The Liberal Party did not win many seats in the region and their efforts to address climate change were seen as an overreach in a place where much of the economy is dependent on fossil fuels.

==== Senate reform ====
The West has been the most vocal in calls for reform of the Senate, in which Ontario, Quebec, and particularly Atlantic Canada are seen by some westerners as being over-represented. The population of Ontario alone (13.1 million) exceeds that of all the western provinces combined. The total population of Atlantic Canada, however, is 2.3 million, and this region is represented by 30 senators. Thus, Ontario is under-represented, Quebec has representation proportional to its population and the Atlantic provinces are over-represented. Westerners have advocated the so-called Triple-E Senate, which stands for "equal, elected, effective." They feel if all 10 provinces were allotted an equal number of senators, if those senators were elected instead of appointed, and if the Senate were a body that had more direct political power (for example via an arrangement more similar to the structure of the Australian Senate or the United States Senate rather than the UK model), then their region would have more of its concerns addressed at the federal level. Other westerners find this approach simplistic and either advocate keeping the status quo or may support other models for senate reform. The combination of all of these issues has led to the concept known as Western alienation, as well as calls for Western Canada independence by various fringe groups.

=== Provincial politics ===
Regarding provincial politics, from May 2001 to June 2017, the British Columbia Liberal Party formed the provincial government in British Columbia, though despite the name is not formally allied with the federal Liberal Party and is widely seen as centre-right or conservative in nature.It is also composed of members from the federal Conservative Party's right-wing and many former Reform Party supporters. Following the 2017 provincial election in British Columbia, the British Columbia New Democratic Party formed a minority government with the support of the British Columbia Green Party, following the defeat of Christy Clark's Liberal Party government by a vote of non-confidence. As of October 2020, the BC NDP hold a majority government in the legislature. The New Democratic Party holds a majority in the Manitoba legislature. The 2023 Alberta general election reduced the United Conservative Party's seat count, but they held on to a majority. The Saskatchewan Party holds a supermajority government in its legislature.

Provincial Legislatures

Legislative assembly of British Columbia. The Conservatives, Greens, and NDP are represented by blue, green, and orange respectively.

Legislative Assembly of Alberta. The NDP and United Conservatives are represented by orange and dark blue respectively.

Legislative Assembly of Saskatchewan. The NDP and Saskatchewan Party are represented by orange and green respectively.

Legislative Assembly of Manitoba. The Liberals, NDP and Progressive Conservatives are represented by red, orange and blue respectively.

== Economy ==
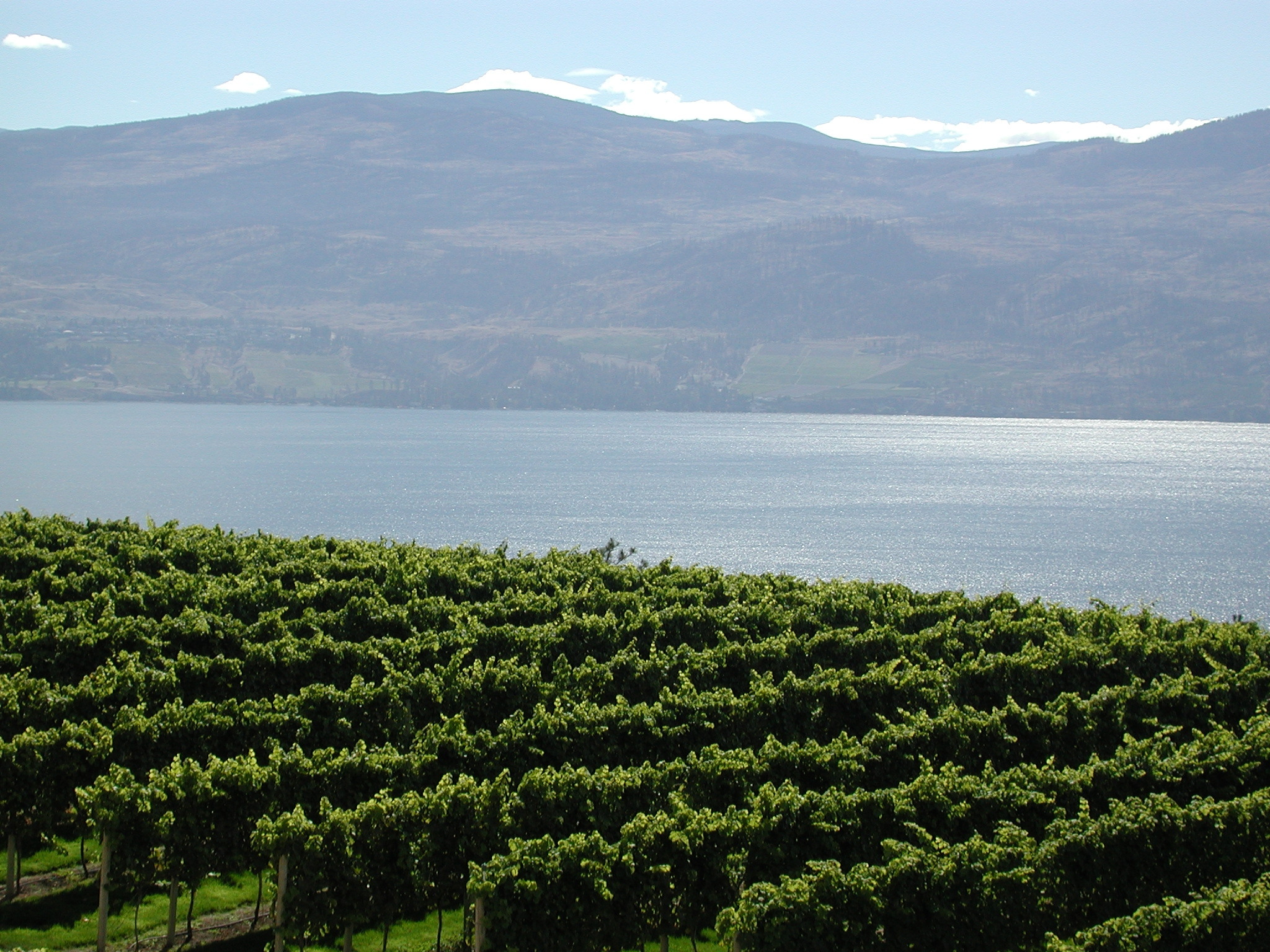
Vineyards in British Columbia

Energy and agriculture are Western Canada's dominant industries – and this region, with only 11 million inhabitants, is one of the world's largest net exporters of both energy and agricultural commodities. Approximate breakdown:

Energy:

- Oil (13% of world reserves; 4% of world production)
- Uranium (8% of world reserves; 20% of world production)

Agriculture:

- Potash (60% of world reserves; 30% of world production)
- Wheat, coarse grains, oilseeds (21% of the world export market for wheat; 10% for oilseeds)
- Farmland (80% of Canadian total)

== See also ==
- History of the west coast of North America
- Eastern Canada
- American Old West
- Western United States
- Cascadia
