= Batoche (disambiguation) =

Batoche is a historic site in Saskatchewan.

Batoche may also refer to:

- Batoche (electoral district), an electoral district in Saskatchewan
- Batoche (former electoral district), a former electoral district in Saskatchewan
- Batoche (N.W.T. electoral district), a former electoral district in the North-West Territories

== See also ==
- Battle of Batoche, during the North-West Rebellion
