= Northwest Territories general election, 1905 =

In late 1905, two general elections were held in what was the Northwest Territories up to 1 September 1905.

- The Alberta general election on 9 November, and
- the Saskatchewan general election on 13 December.
