= William John Patterson =

6th Premier of Saskatchewan (1935–1944)

The Honourable William John Patterson
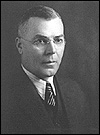

10th Lieutenant Governor of Saskatchewan
- In office June 25, 1951 – February 3, 1958
- Monarchs: George VI; Elizabeth II
- Governors General: The Viscount Alexander of Tunis; Vincent Massey
- Premier: Tommy Douglas
- Preceded by: John Michael Uhrich
- Succeeded by: Frank Lindsay Bastedo

6th Premier of Saskatchewan
- In office November 1, 1935 – July 10, 1944
- Monarchs: George V Edward VIII; George VI
- Lieutenant Governor: Hugh Edwin Munroe; Archibald Peter McNab
- Preceded by: James G. Gardiner
- Succeeded by: Tommy Douglas

Leader of the Opposition (Saskatchewan)
- In office July 10, 1944 – August 6, 1946
- Preceded by: John Brockelbank
- Succeeded by: Walter Tucker

MLA for Pipestone
- In office June 9, 1921 – June 19, 1934
- Preceded by: Richard James Phin
- Succeeded by: Riding abolished

MLA for Cannington
- In office June 19, 1934 – April 2, 1949
- Preceded by: Samson Wallace Arthur
- Succeeded by: Rosscoe Arnold McCarthy

Personal details
- Born: May 13, 1886 Grenfell, District of Assiniboia, North-West Territories
- Died: June 10, 1976 (aged 90) Regina, Saskatchewan, Canada
- Party: Liberal

William John Patterson (May 13, 1886 – June 10, 1976) was a Liberal politician and the sixth premier of Saskatchewan from 1935 to 1944. He was first elected to the Legislative Assembly of Saskatchewan in the 1921 election. He succeeded James G. Gardiner to become the province's first Saskatchewan-born premier.

Patterson's leadership was considered to be uninspired. He was unable to resist the Co-operative Commonwealth Federation's rise to power in the 1944 election under Tommy Douglas. Patterson's Liberals were reduced to five seats in the Legislature. He resigned as Liberal leader in 1946.

Patterson served as the tenth lieutenant governor of Saskatchewan from 1951 to 1958, becoming the first person to have been both premier and lieutenant governor of the province.

== Early life ==
Paterson was born on May 13, 1886, in Grenfell in what was then the District of Assiniboia of the North-West Territories. His father, John Patterson, had moved to Grenfell in 1882 to work as a railway section foreman during the construction of the Canadian Pacific Railway. His mother, Catherine Fraser, was an immigrant from Scotland.

Patterson left school at 15 and found work first at a bank and then in the Saskatchewan Department of Telephones. Following the outbreak of World War I, Patterson in 1916 enlisted in the Canadian Army, serving as a cavalry officer. He was wounded in September 1918.

Upon his return to Saskatchewan after the war, he studied law in Grenfell under lawyer G.C. Neff and then moved to Windthorst, Saskatchewan to set up a financial and insurance agency.

== Politics ==
Patterson ran in the Saskatchewan general election of 1921, as the Saskatchewan Liberal Party's candidate for the constituency of Pipestone. Patterson won the district and took his seat in the Legislative Assembly of Saskatchewan. Patterson held several cabinet positions in governments headed by Premier James Garfield Gardiner. He was reelected in the 1925 election and the 1929 election, but in the latter case, the Liberals lost the election and so Patterson moved to the Opposition. In the 1934 election, the Liberals returned to power, and Patterson returned to cabinet.

In 1935, Premier Gardiner left provincial politics to become Canadian Minister of Agriculture under Prime Minister William Lyon Mackenzie King. Patterson was elected as Gardiner's successor as leader of the Liberal Party of Saskatchewan and Premier of Saskatchewan. Taking office in the midst of the Great Depression, Patterson sought to extend social programs to assist those in need. His government increased funding for education, enacted pension and debt relief legislation, and expanded public funding for treatment of tuberculosis, cancer, and polio.

However, Patterson subscribed to the conventional wisdom of the day that deficit spending would ruin the province's credit and he thus therefore refused to run a budget deficit, instead funding the increased government spending through a new sales tax. His government also passed legislation making it easier to form credit unions, permitting the formation of unions, and increasing labour standards.

Patterson won re-election in the 1938 election and continued to serve as premier. In the 1944 election, however, the Liberals were easily defeated by the Saskatchewan Co-operative Commonwealth Federation, under the leadership of Tommy Douglas. Patterson served as Leader of the Opposition until 1946, when he resigned as Liberal leader. He remained a Member of the Legislative Assembly and was a candidate in the 1948 election, and was re-elected as the member from Cannington.

Following his resignation, Patterson took up a position with the federal Board of Transport Commissioners.

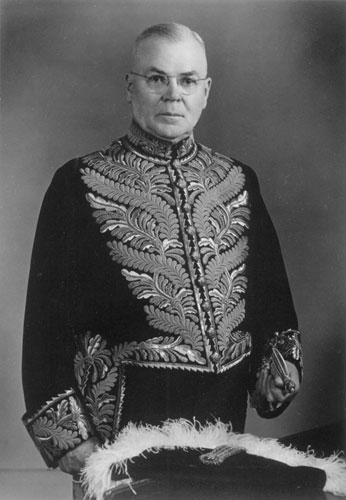
Patterson during his time as Lieutenant Governor of Saskatchewan

In 1951, Patterson was appointed as the first Saskatchewan-born Lieutenant Governor. He served in this post until 1958. Upon Patterson's retirement, Douglas introduced special legislation to provide Patterson with a pension to thank for his many years of service to the province.

Patterson then lived quietly in retirement until his death in Regina, on June 10, 1976.

== Electoral record ==
=== Saskatchewan general elections, 1938 and 1944 ===
==== 1938 General election ====
Patterson led the Liberals in the general election of 1938. He won a solid majority government. The Co-operative Commonwealth Federation under George Hara Williams came in second place and continued as the Official Opposition.

Saskatchewan General Election: June 8, 1938
Party	Leaders	Seats Won	Popular Vote	Popular Vote Percentage
Liberal	William John Patterson^{1}	38	200,334	45.45%
Co-operative Commonwealth Federation	George Hara Williams^{2}	10	82,529	18.73%
Social Credit	Joseph Needham	2	70,084	15.90%
Unity	–	2	9,848	2.24%
Conservative	John Diefenbaker	0	52,315	11.87%
Independent Labour	–	0	12,039	2.73%
Labour Progressive	–	0	8,514	1.93%
Independent	–	0	4,023	0.91%
Independent Conservative	–	0	828	0.19%
Independent Social Credit	–	0	228	0.05%
Total		52	440,742	100.00%
Source: Elections Saskatchewan — Elections Results — 1938

^{1} Premier when election was called; Premier after election.
^{2} Leader of the Opposition when election was called; Leader of the Opposition after election.

==== 1944 General election ====
Provincial elections are normally held between four and five years after the previous election, but this election was delayed because of World War II. Patterson again led the Liberals in the general election of 1944, but this time was soundly defeated by Tommy Douglas and the Co-operative Commonwealth Federation.

Saskatchewan General Election: June 15, 1944
Party	Leaders	Seats Won	Popular Vote	Popular Vote Percentage
Co-operative Commonwealth Federation	Tommy Douglas^{1}	47	211,364	53.13%
Liberal	William John Patterson^{2}	5	140,901	35.42%
Progressive Conservative	Rupert Ramsay	0	42,511	10.69%
Labour Progressive	–	0	2,067	0.52%
Independent	–	0	705	0.18%
Social Credit	Joseph Needham	0	249	0.06%
Independent Liberal	–	0	5	0.00%^{3}
Total		52	397,802	100.00%
Source: Elections Saskatchewan — Elections Results — 1944

^{1} Member of the federal Parliament until shortly before the election was called; Premier after election.
^{2} Premier when election was called; Leader of the Opposition after election.
^{3} Rounds to zero.

=== Saskatchewan constituency elections ===
Patterson stood for election to the Legislative Assembly eight times, in two different ridings, Pipestone and Cannington. He was elected once by acclamation and seven times in contested elections. Although he normally won by healthy pluralities or majorities, in one case, 1944, he won by only six votes.

==== 1921 General election: Pipestone ====
Saskatchewan General Election, June 9, 1921: Pipestone
Party	Candidate	Popular Vote	%
Liberal	E William John Patterson	1,624	47.95%
Independent	Thomas Harkness	1,530	45.17%
Independent	Allan Brown Potter	233	6.88%
Total		3,387	100.00%
Source: Saskatchewan Archives — Election Results by Electoral Division

E Elected.

==== 1925 General election: Pipestone ====
Saskatchewan General Election, June 2, 1925: Pipestone
Party	Candidate	Popular Vote	%
Liberal	E X William John Patterson	2,046	64.52%
Progressive	Elias Parmlee St. John	1,125	35.48%
Total		3,171	100.00%
Source: Saskatchewan Archives — Election Results by Electoral Division

E Elected.
X Incumbent.

==== 1926 By-election: Pipestone ====
Provincial Ministerial By-Election, March 18, 1926: Pipestone
Party	Candidate	Popular Vote	%
Liberal	E X William John Patterson	Acclaimed	–
Total		–	–
Source: Saskatchewan Archives — Election Results by Electoral Division

The by-election was called on Patterson accepting the position of Provincial Treasurer in the Cabinet of Premier Gardiner, an office of profit under the Crown, on February 26, 1926.
E Elected.
X Incumbent.

==== 1929 General election: Pipestone ====
Saskatchewan General Election, June 6, 1929: Pipestone
Party	Candidate	Popular Vote	%
Liberal	E X William John Patterson	2,507	58.34%
Conservative	Frederick Gore Leggett	1,790	41.66%
Total		4,297	100.00%
Source: Saskatchewan Archives — Election Results by Electoral Division

E Elected.
X Incumbent.

==== 1934 General election: Cannington ====
Saskatchewan General Election, June 19, 1934: Cannington
Party	Candidate	Popular Vote	%
Liberal	E William John Patterson	4,222	49.97%
Farmer–Labour	Donald Kenneth Cameron	2,152	25.47%
Conservative	X Samson Wallace Arthur	2,075	24.56%
Total		8,449	100.00%
Source: Saskatchewan Archives — Election Results by Electoral Division

E Elected.
X Incumbent.

==== 1938 General election: Cannington ====
Saskatchewan General Election, June 8, 1938: Cannington
Party	Candidate	Popular Vote	%
Liberal	E X William John Patterson	4,473	56.26%
Co-operative Commonwealth Federation	Gladys Strum	3,477	43.74%
Total		7,950	100.00%
Source: Saskatchewan Archives — Election Results by Electoral Division

E Elected.
X Incumbent.

==== 1944 General election: Cannington ====
Saskatchewan General Election, June 15, 1944: Cannington
Party	Candidate	Popular Vote	%
Liberal	E X William John Patterson	3,210	45.20%
Co-operative Commonwealth Federation	Gladys Strum	3,204	45.12%
Progressive Conservative	William Armstrong Brigden	687	9.67%
Total		7,101	99.99%^{1}
Source: Saskatchewan Archives — Election Results by Electoral Division

E Elected.
X Incumbent.
^{1} Rounding error.

==== 1948 General election: Cannington ====
Saskatchewan General Election, June 24, 1948: Cannington
Party	Candidate	Popular Vote	%
Liberal	E X William John Patterson	4,687	54.44%
Co-operative Commonwealth Federation	Ralph Hjertaas	3,422	39.75%
Social Credit	Peter Franchuk	500	5.81%
Total		8,609	100.00%
Source: Saskatchewan Archives — Election Results by Electoral Division

E Elected.
X Incumbent.
