= Samson Wallace Arthur =

Canadian politician

Samson Wallace Arthur (July 17, 1875 – 1948) was a medical doctor and political figure in Saskatchewan. He represented Cannington from 1929 to 1934 in the Legislative Assembly of Saskatchewan as an independent member.

He was born in Battersea, Ontario, the son of John Arthur and Elizabeth Hearn, and was educated at Queen's University. In 1910, Arthur married Mabel A. Christian. He lived in Redvers, Saskatchewan. Arthur was defeated by William John Patterson when he ran for reelection in 1934 as a Conservative. He also served on the local school board and was a justice of the peace.
