= Henry Willway =

Canadian politician

Henry Hayes Willway (October 17, 1866 – 1935) was an English-born farmer and political figure in Saskatchewan, Canada. He represented Pheasant Hills in the Legislative Assembly of Saskatchewan from 1908 to 1912 as a Provincial Rights Party member.

He was born in Bristol, the son of Henry Philip Willway and Elizabeth Ann Olive, and was educated there. In 1892, Willway married Annette Bawden. He was president of the local agricultural society. Willway lived in Cotham, Saskatchewan.
