= Robert Magee =

Canadian politician

Robert Armstrong Magee (May 21, 1864 – January 12, 1957) was a businessman and political figure in Saskatchewan. He represented Moose Mountain in the Legislative Assembly of Saskatchewan from 1912 to 1921 as a Liberal.

He was born in Ottawa County, Canada East, the son of Francis Magee, and came to Wolseley, Saskatchewan in 1883 by train. Magee served as a scout during the North-West Rebellion of 1885. In 1891, he married Eleanor "Daisy" Campbell; the couple were married by Reverend A. Campbell, Eleanor's father. He was the first mayor of Wolseley, also serving several other terms as mayor. With his brother Richard and A.G. Thompson, he established the Magee and Thompson Company. Magee also was a local justice of the peace, a sheriff and was registrar for the Moosomin judicial district from 1921 to 1939. Magee and his wife later retired to Kelowna, British Columbia. He died at Shaugnessy Hospital in Vancouver.

His former home in Wolseley has been designated a historical site.
