= Rosscoe Arnold McCarthy =

Canadian politician

Rosscoe Arnold McCarthy (January 8, 1891 – 1970) was a political figure in Saskatchewan. He represented Cannington from 1949 to 1964 in the Legislative Assembly of Saskatchewan as a Liberal.

He was born in Hagersville, Ontario, the son of John McCarthy, and was educated there and in Francis, Saskatchewan. In 1921, McCarthy married Annie Ruth McDonnell. He served on the council for the rural municipality of Golden West, also serving as reeve. McCarthy lived in Corning. He was first elected to the provincial assembly in a 1949 by-election held after William John Patterson was named to federal Board of Transport Commissioners.
