= Weatherald =

Surname list

Weatherald is a surname. Notable people with the surname include:

- Jake Weatherald (born 1994), Australian cricketer
- Thomas Milton Weatherald (1937–2019), Canadian politician
- Tim Weatherald (born 1977), Australian rules footballer
