= Charles Morton Dunn =

Canadian politician

Charles Morton Dunn (July 17, 1892 – November 15, 1975) was a life insurance agent and political figure in Saskatchewan. He represented Pheasant Hills from 1929 to 1934 and Francis from 1934 to 1938 in the Legislative Assembly of Saskatchewan as a Liberal.

He was born in Granville Ferry, Nova Scotia, the son of John Henry Dunn and Anne E. Morton, and was educated at the Annapolis Royal Academy. Dunn came to Saskatchewan and was employed by Mutual Life of Canada. He served as president of the Life Underwriters Association of Canada. In 1915, he married Katherine McLeod.

Dunn was a member of the provincial cabinet, serving as Minister of Highways. In 1938, he was defeated when he ran for reelection in Melville and again later that year in a by-election held in Humboldt.
