= Thomas McAfee =

Irish-Canadian politician

Thomas McAfee (November 28, 1866 – May 1947) was an Irish-born Presbyterian minister and political figure in Saskatchewan. He represented Wolseley from 1925 to 1929 in the Legislative Assembly of Saskatchewan as a Liberal.

He was born in Ballyboggy, Dervock, County Antrim and was educated in Ballymoney. McAfee taught school for two years before moving to Dublin to become the assistant to the editor for The Christian Irishman. He travelled to Winnipeg, Manitoba in 1893, attending Manitoba College, where he studied arts and theology. In 1898, he was sent to Indian Head, Saskatchewan as pastor of St. Andrew's Church. In 1900, McAfee married Elizabeth Swan. He served as honorary chairman of the hospital board and as chaplain of the curling club and of the Provincial Curling Association. In 1908, McAfee was named moderator for the Synod of Saskatchewan. During World War I, he served overseas as chaplain. McAfee was defeated when he ran for reelection to the provincial assembly in 1929. He remained in Saskatchewan until 1931, when he was called to serve as pastor for a church in Arnprior, Ontario. McAfee remained there until his retirement in 1941. He was named moderator of the Synod of Montreal and Ottawa in 1938. In 1942, he returned to Regina, Saskatchewan, where his daughter lived. McAfee died in Regina at the age of 80.
