= Wolseley Town Hall and Opera House =

Coordinates: 50.4242°N 103.2711°W

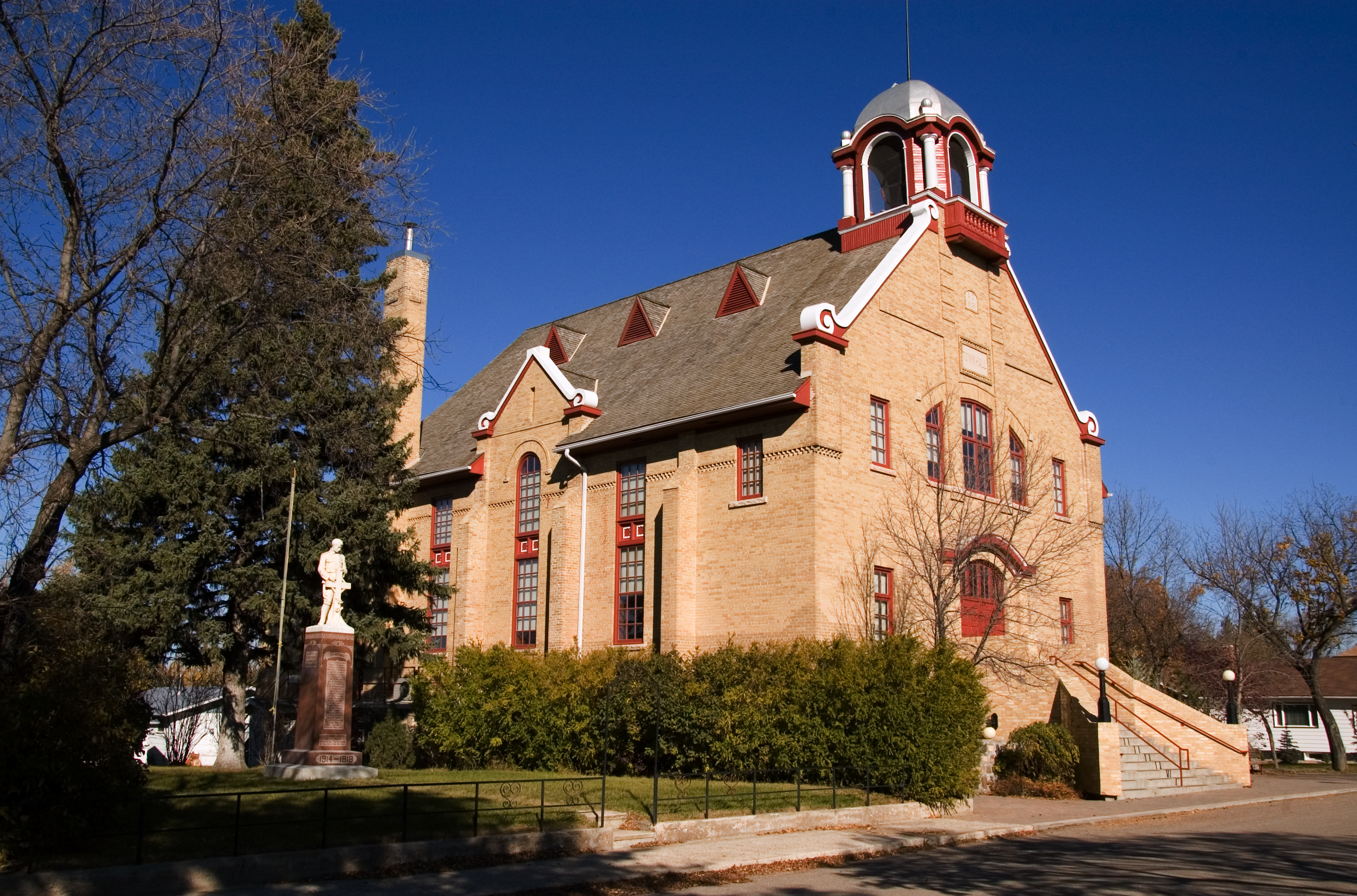
- Wolseley Town Hall and Opera House
- Interactive map of the Wolseley Town Hall and Opera House area

General information
- Architectural style: Italian Baroque
- Location: 510 Varennes Street, Wolseley, Saskatchewan, Canada
- Construction started: 1906
- Completed: 1907

Design and construction
- Architect: J.H.G. Russell

Saskatchewan Heritage Property Act
- Official name: Provincial Heritage Property
- Designated: 1991

The Wolseley Town Hall and Opera House (today called the Wolseley Community Centre) is a provincial designated historic building in the town of Wolseley, Saskatchewan, Canada. The property is a two-storey, brick and fieldstone building of Italian Baroque design, constructed between 1906 and 1907. The building was intended to be multi-purpose serving as a town office, fire hall, library, community hall as well as performances from visiting tour groups. The building serves the town as a community hall.
