= Wolseley, Saskatchewan =

Town in Saskatchewan, Canada

Coordinates: 50.425°N 103.273°W

Wolseley
- Town
- Town of Wolseley
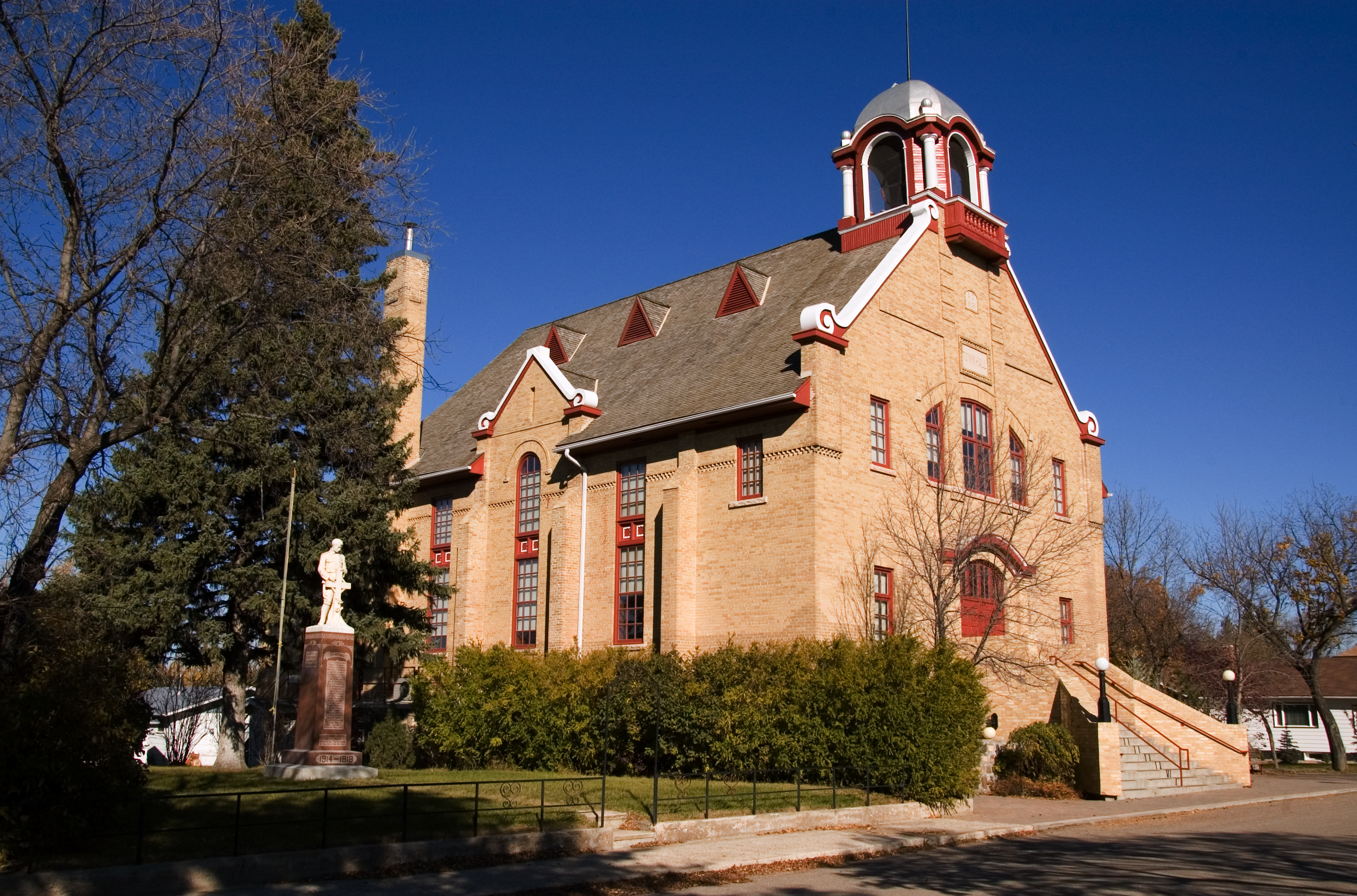
- Wolseley Opera House
- Interactive map of Wolseley
- Country: Canada
- Province: Saskatchewan
- Census division: 5
- Rural municipality: Wolseley
- Post office established: 1882-10-01

Government
  - Type: Mayor/Council
  - Mayor: Gerald Hill
  - Administrator: Candice Quintyn
  - MLA: Steven Bonk
  - MP: Andrew Scheer

Area
  - Total: 5.93 km^{2} (2.29 sq mi)

Population (2011)
  - Total: 864
  - Density: 145.6/km^{2} (377/sq mi)
- Time zone: UTC-6 (Central)
- Postal code: S0G 5H0
- Area code: 306
- Highways: Highway 1 (TCH) / Highway 617
- Website: Town of Wolseley

Wolseley (Canada 2011 Census population 864) is a town in southeast Saskatchewan, Canada, approximately 100 kilometres (62 mi) east of Regina on the Trans-Canada Highway.

== History ==
Wolseley's Provincial Court House building was constructed in 1893 and is the oldest surviving courthouse building in the province. The Town Hall and Opera House, built in 1906, is a classic building used for many community events. Canada's first Beaver Lumber was opened in Wolseley by co-founder E. A. Banbury in 1883. Beaver Lumber is now protected by Heritage status. The Banbury House Inn, which was originally built in 1905 as the private home for E. A. Banbury, was moved from its original location on the north bank of Fairly Lake to the west end of Wolseley to allow expansion of Lakeside Care Home in the 1980s. The Banbury House Inn now serves as a bed and breakfast.

Two private residences are also on the Canadian List of Historic Places. The Perley Residence, located at 206 Front Street, is a two-storey brick house which was the home of several prominent Wolseley residents, including the first miller in town, as well as A. A. Perley.

The home of Wolseley's first mayor, R. A. Magee, is another heritage property. It remains a private residence and is situated immediately south of the Town Hall and Opera House.

== Community ==
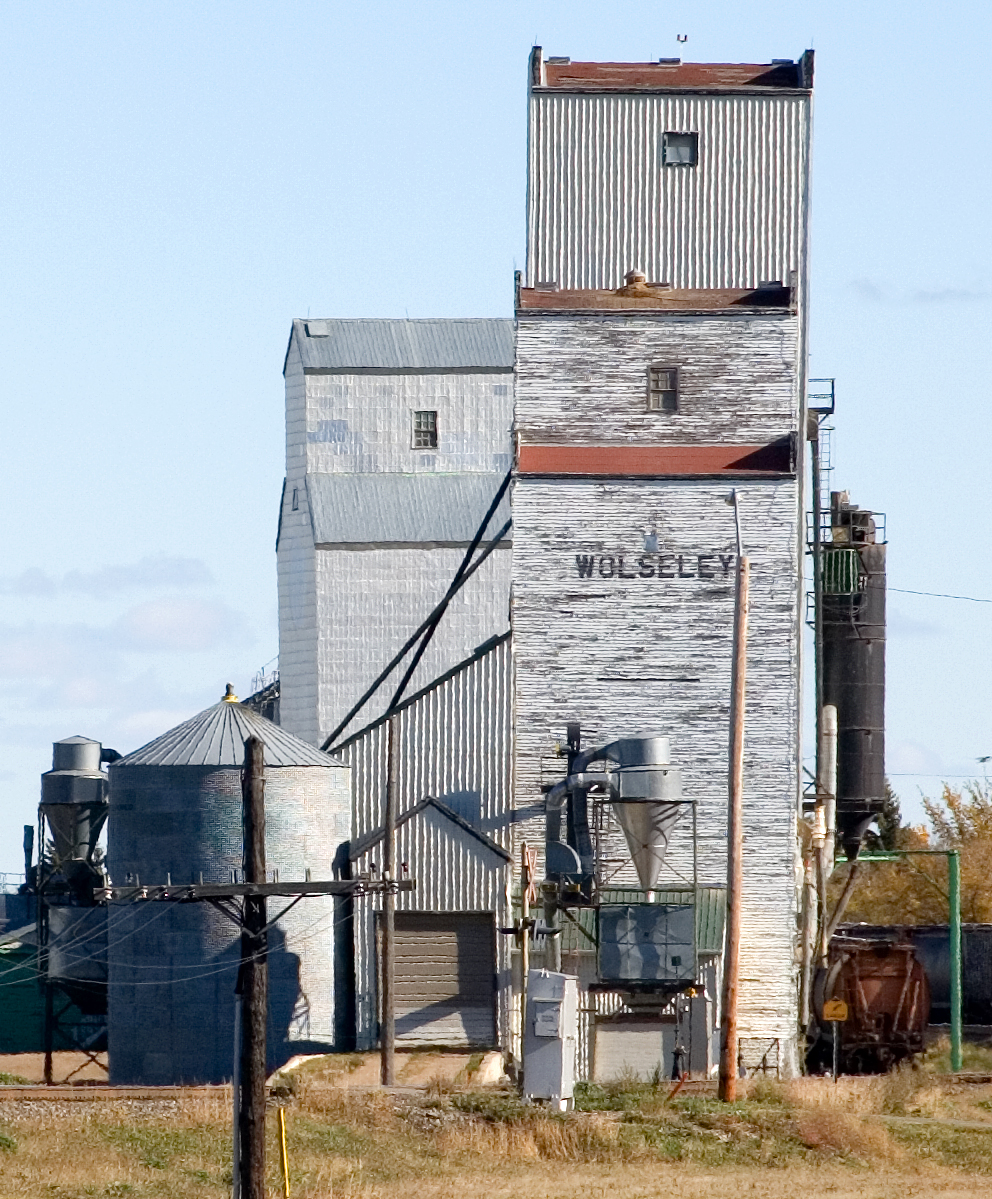
Wolseley Elevator

It has two schools, Dr. Isman Elementary School and Wolseley High School. The recently rebuilt "swinging bridge" has been a feature of Wolseley since 1905. It has a twelve-bed hospital, an eighty-bed nursing home, and two resident doctors.

The town is served by three weekly newspapers: The Wolseley Bulletin, The Indian Head-Wolseley News and The Grenfell Sun. A tourist information radio station, CISE-FM, is based out of Wolseley.

Wolseley has a modern artificial ice arena, a curling rink, a nine-hole golf course, and a public swimming beach which is located on the shore of Fairly Lake, the town's most distinguishing feature. This body of water was formed when the Canadian Pacific Railway dammed Aldair Creek in 1902 to obtain a water supply for its steam engines. Fairly Lake gives the town its nickname (Town By The Lake). The town was named one of Canada's prettiest, most historic towns by Harrowsmith Country Life in 2000.

Wolseley is home to a thriving arts community, and in the downtown area, there is an art gallery which is the meeting place of the Wolseley Writers Group, the Wolseley Photography Club, and the Ellisboro Artisans Guild. The Twilite Drive-In Theatre in Wolseley is one of the few left in Saskatchewan. The others include the Jubilee Drive-In Theatre in Manitou Beach, the Clearwater Drive-In in Kyle, the Moonlight Movies Drive-in in Pilot Butte, and the Prairie Dog Drive-in Theatre in Carlyle.

== Demographics ==
In the 2021 Census of Population conducted by Statistics Canada, Wolseley had a population of 852 living in 360 of its 392 total private dwellings, a change of −0.2% from its 2016 population of 854. With a land area of 5.84 km^{2} (2.25 sq mi), it had a population density of 145.9/km^{2} (377.9/sq mi) in 2021.

Canada census – Wolseley, Saskatchewan community profile

	2011
Population	864 (10.5% from 2006)
Land area	5.93 km^{2} (2.29 sq mi)
Population density	145.6/km^{2} (377/sq mi)
Median age	47.9 (M: 42.9, F: 52.8)
Private dwellings	383 (total)
Median household income

References: 2011

== See also ==
- List of communities in Saskatchewan
- List of towns in Saskatchewan
