= Richard James Phin =

Canadian politician

Richard James Phin (1859 – 1939) was a farmer, rancher and political figure in Saskatchewan, Canada. He represented Pipestone in the Legislative Assembly of Saskatchewan from 1912 to 1921 as a Liberal.

He was born in Hespeler, Canada West, of Scottish descent, and was educated at Guelph Agricultural College. In 1883, he moved to Saskatchewan, settling in Moosomin, Saskatchewan. He married Mary Jane "Minnie" Cavanagh in 1884. Phin served on the Methodist church board in Moosomin. Phin established the Spring Creek Cheese Factory. In 1894, the family moved northeast to Elgin district to be closer to the Canadian Pacific Railway line. Phin served as president of the North Rural Telephone Company. He returned to Moosomin in 1930.
