= Alberta Act =

Foundation enactment of Province of Alberta

Part of the Constitution of Canada
- Long title: An Act to establish and provide for the Government of the Province of Alberta
- Citation: SC 1905, c. 3
- Enacted by: Parliament of Canada
- Assented to by: Edward VII
- Royal assent: July 20, 1905
- Commenced: September 1, 1905
- Status: Current legislation

The Alberta Act (French: Loi sur l'Alberta), effective September 1, 1905, is the act of the Parliament of Canada that created the province of Alberta. The act is similar in nature to the Saskatchewan Act, which established the province of Saskatchewan at the same time. Like the Saskatchewan Act, the Alberta Act was controversial because (sec. 21) it maintained the Government of Canada's control of all of Alberta's natural resources and public lands. Alberta did not win control of these resources until the passage of the Natural Resources Acts in 1930.

The Alberta Act defined the boundaries for the electoral districts of the first Alberta general election in 1905.

The Alberta Act is part of the Constitution of Canada.

== See also ==
- Saskatchewan Act
