= Wolseley (Saskatchewan electoral district) =

Former provincial electoral district in Saskatchewan, Canada

Coordinates: 50°15′N 103°15′W

Wolseley was a provincial electoral district for the Legislative Assembly of the province of Saskatchewan, Canada. Centred on the town of Wolseley, it was one of 25 constituencies created for the 1st Saskatchewan general election in 1905.

Created as "Wolseley" before 1905, the district was redrawn and renamed "Moose Mountain" in 1908. Redrawn and renamed again in 1921, the riding was abolished before the 8th Saskatchewan general election in 1934 into Qu'Appelle-Wolseley and Moosomin.

It is now part of the constituencies of Indian Head-Milestone and Moosomin.

== Members of the Legislative Assembly ==
#	MLA	Served	Party
1.	William Elliott	1905 – 1912	Provincial Rights
2.	Robert Armstrong Magee	1912 – 1921	Liberal
3.	William George Bennett	1921 – 1925	Independent, Conservative
4.	Thomas McAfee	1925 – 1929	Liberal
5.	William George Bennett	1929 – 1934	Conservative

== Election results ==
=== Wolseley (1905–1908) ===
1905 Saskatchewan general election: Wolseley electoral district
Party	Candidate	Votes	%	±%
Provincial Rights	William Elliott	715	50.71%	–
Liberal	Levi Thomson	695	49.29%	–
Total		1,410	100.00%	

=== Moose Mountain (1908–1921) ===
1908 Saskatchewan general election: Moose Mountain electoral district
Party	Candidate	Votes	%	±%
Provincial Rights	William Elliott	1,023	51.23%	-0.52
Liberal	Christopher John Rosborough	974	48.77%	+0.52
Total		1,997	100.00%	

1912 Saskatchewan general election: Moose Mountain electoral district
Party	Candidate	Votes	%	±%
Liberal	Robert Armstrong Magee	1,001	52.77%	+4.00
Conservative	William Elliott	896	47.23%	-4.00
Total		1,897	100.00%	

1917 Saskatchewan general election: Moose Mountain electoral district
Party	Candidate	Votes	%	±%
Liberal	Robert Armstrong Magee	1,824	51.80%	-0.97
Conservative	William Elliott	1,697	48.20%	+0.97
Total		3,521	100.00%	

=== Wolseley (1921–1934) ===
1921 Saskatchewan general election: Wolseley electoral district
Party		Candidate	Votes	%	±%
}	Independent	William George Bennett	2,322	54.51%	–
	Liberal	Robert Armstrong Magee	1,938	45.49%	-6.31
Total			4,260	100.00%	

1925 Saskatchewan general election: Wolseley electoral district
Party	Candidate	Votes	%	±%
Liberal	Thomas McAfee	2,559	51.84%	+6.35
Conservative	William George Bennett	2,377	48.16%	-6.35
Total		4,936	100.00%	

1929 Saskatchewan general election: Wolseley electoral district
Party	Candidate	Votes	%	±%
Conservative	William George Bennett	3,450	57.73%	+9.57
Liberal	Thomas McAfee	2,526	42.27%	-9.57
Total		5,976	100.00%	

== See also ==
- List of Saskatchewan provincial electoral districts
- List of Saskatchewan general elections
- Canadian provincial electoral districts
- Wolseley — North-West Territories territorial electoral district (1870–1905).
