= Gerhard Ens =

Canadian politician (1864–1952)

Gerhard Ens (January 9, 1864 [December 28, 1863 O.S. ] – January 2, 1952) was a Ukrainian-born farmer, immigration agent and political figure in Saskatchewan. He represented Batoche from 1905 to 1908 and Rosthern from 1908 to 1913 in the Legislative Assembly of Saskatchewan as a Liberal.

He was born in Neuendorf, Chortitza Colony, the son of Kornelius G. Ens and Barbara Giesbrecht. In 1883, Ens married Anna Dyck. He came to Canada with his family in 1891. Ens is considered by many to be the founder of Rosthern, Saskatchewan. After the death of his first wife, he married Maria (Epp) Penner in 1936. Ens promoted Mennonite immigration to Canada from Russia and the United States. He was also president of the Rosthern Realty Company. Ens served as government whip in the assembly. He resigned his seat in the assembly in 1913 when he was named Inspector of Public Institutions. He died in Rosthern.
