= William M. Grant =

Canadian politician

William M. Grant (September 20, 1868 – January 9, 1931) was a real estate agent and political figure in Saskatchewan. He represented Batoche in the Legislative Assembly of Saskatchewan from 1905 to 1908 as a Liberal.

He was born in Princeton, Ontario, the son of Adam Grant and Lucinda Everette, and was educated there. In 1905, Grant married Catherine Henry. For a time, he worked at the jail in Regina, Saskatchewan. He also was a farming instructor at the Regina Industrial School. Grant later worked as an agent for the Massey-Harris company.

== See also ==
- Politics of Canada
