= James Franklin Bole =

Canadian politician

James Franklin Bole (April 23, 1869 – June 1954) was a businessman and political figure in Saskatchewan. He represented Regina City in the Legislative Assembly of Saskatchewan from 1905 to 1915 as a Liberal.

He was born in Watford, Ontario, the son of James Bole and Ann Murdock, both natives of Ireland, and was educated in Watford and Regina. Bole came west with his family in 1882, settling on a homestead in Saskatchewan. He worked as a mail carrier in Regina and then worked as a printer's devil for the Regina Leader before returning to work on the family farm. Bole married Agnes De Courtnay in 1896. In 1898, he established the Regina Trading Company, Regina's first department store. Bole resigned his seat in the provincial assembly in 1915 to become Saskatchewan liquor commissioner; this post was eliminated when prohibition came into effect in the province the following year. He later became a representative for the Saskatchewan Life Insurance Company. Bole also served on Regina city council. He died at the age of 85.
