= Andrew Argue =

Canadian politician (1862–1945)

Andrew William Argue (1862 – February 5, 1945) was a physician and political figure in Saskatchewan. He represented Grenfell in the Legislative Assembly of Saskatchewan from 1905 to 1908 as a Provincial Rights Party member.

He was born in Stittsville, Canada West and was educated at the University of Manitoba. He set up practice in Grenfell, Saskatchewan. He married Grace Elizabeth Young in 1902. Argue served as president of the Medical Council of Canada from 1944 to 1945 and served two terms as president for the College of Physicians and Surgeons of Saskatchewan, also serving as its registrar from 1940 to 1944. He also served on the board of governors for the University of Saskatchewan. Argue died in hospital in Regina after an extended illness.
