= Albert Champagne =

Canadian politician

Albert Champagne (June 5, 1866 – October 12, 1937) was a Saskatchewan rancher, hotel-owner and political figure. He represented Battleford in the Legislative Assembly of Saskatchewan from 1905 to 1908 and in the House of Commons of Canada as a Liberal from 1908 to 1917.

He was born in Ottawa in 1866, the son of Séraphin Champagne. He apprenticed as a tailor there before enrolling in the North-West Mounted Police in 1885. In 1895, Champagne left the police and purchased a large ranch near Battleford, Saskatchewan. He later sold the ranch and took over the operation of a hotel in Battleford, buying another hotel there a few years later. He was also involved in the sale of horses. In 1904, Champagne became the first mayor of Battleford. He ran unsuccessfully for reelection to the federal parliament for Battleford in 1921.

He died at Ottawa in 1937.

Champagne was the first francophone to serve in the Saskatchewan assembly and the only French-speaking member from western Canada during his term in the House of Commons.

His brother Napoléon served in the Ontario provincial assembly and also as mayor of Ottawa.
