= John Duncan Stewart =

Canadian politician

John Duncan Stewart (October 16, 1859 – 1921) was a farmer and political figure in Saskatchewan. He represented Cannington in the Legislative Assembly of Saskatchewan from 1905 to 1921 as a Liberal.

He was born in Perth County, Canada West, and was educated there. Stewart received homestead land in Saskatchewan in 1882. He lived in Arcola, Saskatchewan and was manager for the Arcola Farmers' Elevator Company. Stewart ran unsuccessfully for a seat on the Legislative Assembly of the North-West Territories in 1902.
