= Cannington (former electoral district) =

Former provincial electoral district in Saskatchewan, Canada

Coordinates: 49°25′N 102°00′W

Cannington was a provincial electoral district for the Legislative Assembly of the province of Saskatchewan, Canada. This district was one of 25 created for the 1st Saskatchewan general election in 1905. It was preceded by a Territorial constituency of the same name. The constituency was combined with the "Souris" district of Souris-Estevan (and renamed "Souris-Cannington"), and lost parts to Moosomin, Indian Head-Wolseley, Weyburn and Estevan before the 18th Saskatchewan general election in 1975.

It was the riding of Premier William John Patterson.

== Members of the Legislative Assembly ==
#	MLA	Served	Party
1.	John Duncan Stewart	1905–1921	Liberal
2.	Robert Douglas	1921–1924	Liberal
3.	Albert Edward Steele	June 9, 1924 – 1929	Liberal
4.	Samson Wallace Arthur	1929–1934	Independent, Conservative
5.	William John Patterson	1934–1949	Liberal
6.	Rosscoe A. McCarthy	Nov. 10, 1949–1964	Liberal
7.	Tom Weatherald	1964–1975	Liberal

== Election results ==
1905 Saskatchewan general election: Cannington electoral district
Party	Candidate	Votes	%	±%
Liberal	John Duncan Stewart	1,157	52.00%	–
Provincial Rights	Ewan Cameron McDiarmid	1,068	48.00%	–
Total		2,225	100.00%	

1908 Saskatchewan general election: Cannington electoral district
Party	Candidate	Votes	%	±%
Liberal	John Duncan Stewart	1,173	54.08%	+2.08
Provincial Rights	Peter McSuman	996	45.92%	-2.08
Total		2,169	100.00%	

1912 Saskatchewan general election: Cannington electoral district
Party	Candidate	Votes	%	±%
Liberal	John Duncan Stewart	1,238	64.28%	+10.20
Conservative	Charles Edward D. Wood	688	35.72%	-10.20
Total		1,926	100.00%	

1917 Saskatchewan general election: Cannington electoral district
Party	Candidate	Votes	%	±%
Liberal	John Duncan Stewart	1,921	62.07%	-2.21
Conservative	William Mauson Connor	1,174	37.93%	+2.21
Total		3,095	100.00%	

1921 Saskatchewan general election: Cannington electoral district
Party	Candidate	Votes	%	±%
Liberal	Robert Douglas	1,606	64.65%	+2.58
Independent	George W. Stockton	878	35.35%	–
Total		2,484	100.00%	

June 9, 1924 By-Election: Cannington electoral district
Party	Candidate	Votes	%	±%
Liberal	Albert Edward Steele	Acclaimed	100.00%	
Total		Acclamation		

1925 Saskatchewan general election: Cannington electoral district
Party	Candidate	Votes	%	±%
Liberal	Albert Edward Steele	1,666	63.23%	-
Independent	William Henry Bagot	969	36.77%	-
Total		2,635	100.00%	

1929 Saskatchewan general election: Cannington electoral district
Party	Candidate	Votes	%	±%
Independent	Samson Wallace Arthur	1,913	50.34%	+13.57
Liberal	Albert Edward Steele	1,887	49.66%	-13.57
Total		3,800	100.00%	

1934 Saskatchewan general election: Cannington electoral district
Party	Candidate	Votes	%	±%
Liberal	William John Patterson	4,222	49.97%	+0.31
Farmer-Labour	Donald K. Cameron	2,152	25.47%	–
Conservative	Samson Wallace Arthur	2,075	24.56%	-25.78
Total		8,449	100.00%	

1938 Saskatchewan general election: Cannington electoral district
Party	Candidate	Votes	%	±%
Liberal	William John Patterson	4,473	56.26%	+6.29
CCF	Gladys Strum	3,477	43.74%	+18.27
Total		7,950	100.00%	

1944 Saskatchewan general election: Cannington electoral district
Party	Candidate	Votes	%	±%
Liberal	William John Patterson	3,210	45.20%	-11.06
CCF	Gladys Strum	3,204	45.12%	+1.38
Prog. Conservative	William A. Brigden	687	9.68%	-
Total		7,101	100.00%	

1948 Saskatchewan general election: Cannington electoral district
Party	Candidate	Votes	%	±%
Liberal	William John Patterson	4,687	54.44%	+9.24
CCF	Ralph Hjertaas	3,422	39.75%	-5.37
Social Credit	Peter Franchuk	500	5.81%	–
Total		8,609	100.00%	

November 10, 1949 By-Election: Cannington electoral district
Party	Candidate	Votes	%	±%
Liberal	Rosscoe A. McCarthy	4,200	54.06%	-0.38
CCF	Edward G. McCullough	3,569	45.94%	+6.19
Total		7,769	100.00%	

1952 Saskatchewan general election: Cannington electoral district
Party	Candidate	Votes	%	±%
Liberal	Rosscoe A. McCarthy	4,562	52.38%	-1.68
CCF	William J. G. Sawyer	4,147	47.62%	+1.68
Total		8,709	100.00%	

1956 Saskatchewan general election: Cannington electoral district
Party	Candidate	Votes	%	±%
Liberal	Rosscoe A. McCarthy	4,021	49.74%	-2.64
CCF	William J. G. Sawyer	2,843	35.17%	-12.45
Social Credit	Norman R. Housworth	1,220	15.09%	-
Total		8,084	100.00%	

1960 Saskatchewan general election: Cannington electoral district
Party	Candidate	Votes	%	±%
Liberal	Rosscoe A. McCarthy	3,781	44.84%	-4.90
CCF	Edward G. McCullough	2,789	33.08%	-2.09
Social Credit	Howard A. Yung	928	11.01%	-4.08
Prog. Conservative	Harvey Reid	838	9.94%	-
Independent	George J. Tkach	95	1.13%	-
Total		8,431	100.00%	

1964 Saskatchewan general election: Cannington electoral district
Party	Candidate	Votes	%	±%
Liberal	Tom Weatherald	3,852	46.65%	+1.81
CCF	Henry G. Doty	2,489	30.14%	-2.94
Prog. Conservative	Glenn Brimner	1,917	23.21%	+13.27
Total		8,258	100.00%	

1967 Saskatchewan general election: Cannington electoral district
Party	Candidate	Votes	%	±%
Liberal	Tom Weatherald	3,436	47.40%	+0.75
NDP	Stanley G. Barnard	2,377	32.79%	+2.65
Prog. Conservative	Glenn Brimner	1,436	19.81%	-3.40
Total		7,249	100.00%	

1971 Saskatchewan general election: Cannington electoral district
Party	Candidate	Votes	%	±%
Liberal	Tom Weatherald	3,854	51.14%	+3.74
NDP	James T. Eaton	3,682	48.86%	+16.07
Total		7,536	100.00%	

== See also ==
- List of Saskatchewan provincial electoral districts
- List of Saskatchewan general elections
- Canadian provincial electoral districts
