= Battleford (provincial electoral district) =

Former provincial electoral district in Saskatchewan, Canada

Coordinates: 52°45′N 108°18′W

Battleford was a provincial electoral district for the Legislative Assembly of Saskatchewan, Canada. It was one of the 25 ridings created when the province came into existence in 1905. It was replaced before the 1917 general election, by the riding of Cut Knife and by combining the eastern tip of the riding with the North Battleford provincial district to create The Battlefords.

== Member of the Legislative Assembly ==
#	MLA	Served	Party
1.	Albert Champagne	1905 - 1907	Liberal
2.	Sydney Seymour Simpson	1907 - 1917	Liberal

== Election results ==
Saskatchewan General Election 1905: Battleford
Party	Candidate	Votes	%	±%
Liberal	Albert Champagne	914	60.85	-
Provincial Rights	Robert Ferguson Chisholm	588	39.14	-
Total		1,502	100.00	

Saskatchewan General Election 1908: Battleford
Party	Candidate	Votes	%	±%
Liberal	Sydney Seymour Simpson	912	53.48	-7.36
Provincial Rights	Archibald Cameron Dewar	793	46.51	+7.36
Total		1,705	100.00	

Saskatchewan General Election 1912: Battleford
Party	Candidate	Votes	%	±%
Liberal	Sydney Seymour Simpson	568	62.69	+9.20
Conservative	Robert Ovens	338	37.30	-9.20
Total		906	100.00	

== See also ==
- List of Saskatchewan provincial electoral districts
- List of Saskatchewan general elections
- Canadian provincial electoral districts
