= Pipestone (electoral district) =

Former provincial electoral district in Saskatchewan, Canada

Coordinates: 50°15′N 102°25′W

Pipestone was a provincial electoral district for the Legislative Assembly of the province of Saskatchewan, Canada. Located in southeastern Saskatchewan, this district was created as Whitewood before the 1st Saskatchewan general election in 1905. In 1908 the riding was redrawn and renamed "Pipestone", after the Pipestone Creek that flowed through the district.

This constituency was abolished before the 8th Saskatchewan general election in 1934 into Cannington, Moosomin and Qu'Appelle-Wolseley. It is now part of the Moosomin constituency.

== Members of the Legislative Assembly ==
#	MLA	Served	Party
1.	Archibald Gillis	1905 – 1912	Provincial Rights
2.	Richard James Phin	1912 – 1921	Liberal
3.	William John Patterson	1921 – 1934	Liberal

== Election results ==
1905 Saskatchewan general election: Whitewood
Party	Candidate	Votes	%
Provincial Rights	Archibald Gillis	867	65.24%
Liberal	Archibald Cowan	462	34.76%
Total		1,329	100.00%

1908 Saskatchewan general election
Party	Candidate	Votes	%	±%
Provincial Rights	Archibald Gillis	1,001	64.13%	-1.11
Liberal	James Robinson	560	35.87%	+1.11
Total		1,561	100.00%	

1912 Saskatchewan general election
Party	Candidate	Votes	%	±%
Liberal	Richard James Phin	1,006	50.60%	+14.73
Conservative	Archibald Gillis	982	49.40%	-14.73
Total		1,988	100.00%	

1917 Saskatchewan general election: Pipestone electoral district
Party	Candidate	Votes	%	±%
Liberal	Richard James Phin	1,679	53.20%	+2.60
Conservative	Robert Lillie Kidd	1,477	46.80%	-2.60
Total		3,156	100.00%	

1921 Saskatchewan general election: Pipestone electoral district
Party	Candidate	Votes	%	±%
Liberal	William John Patterson	1,624	47.95%	-5.25
Independent	Thomas Harkness	1,530	45.17%	–
Independent	Allan Brown Potter	233	6.88%	–
Total		3,387	100.00%	

1925 Saskatchewan general election: Pipestone electoral district
Party	Candidate	Votes	%	±%
Liberal	William John Patterson	2,046	64.52%	+16.57
Progressive	Elias Parmlee St. John	1,125	35.48%	–
Total		3,171	100.00%	

March 18, 1926 By-Election: Pipestone electoral district
Party	Candidate	Votes	%	±%
Liberal	William John Patterson	Acclaimed	100.00%	
Total		Acclamation		

1929 Saskatchewan general election: Pipestone electoral district
Party	Candidate	Votes	%	±%
Liberal	William John Patterson	2,507	58.34%	-
Conservative	Frederick Gore Leggett	1,790	41.66%	-
Total		4,297	100.00%	

== See also ==
- List of Saskatchewan provincial electoral districts
- List of Saskatchewan general elections
- Canadian provincial electoral districts
- Whitewood — North-West Territories territorial electoral district (1870–1905)
- Whitewood, Saskatchewan
