= Thomas Henry Garry =

Canadian politician

Thomas Henry Garry (January 28, 1862 – October 1954) was a rancher and political figure in Saskatchewan. He represented Yorkton in the Legislative Assembly of Saskatchewan from 1905 to 1929 as a Liberal.

Garry was the son of Thomas Garry and Colena Kennedy. He came to High Bluff, Manitoba from Ontario with his father and brother in 1883. The family settled at York Colony (later Yorkton, Saskatchewan) the following year. Garry served in the Home Guard during the North-West Rebellion of 1885. He worked at a nearby grist mill for two years before finding work at a ranch; Garry later bought the ranch for himself. In 1900, he married Nellie Sharp. Garry was defeated by Alan Carl Stewart when he ran for reelection to the Saskatchewan assembly in 1929. He died at the age of 92.
