= Pheasant Hills (provincial electoral district) =

Former provincial electoral district in Saskatchewan, Canada

Coordinates: 50°33′N 102°57′W

Pheasant Hills was a provincial electoral district for the Legislative Assembly of the province of Saskatchewan, Canada, centred just north of the town of Grenfell. This district was one of 25 created before the 1st Saskatchewan general election in 1905.

Originally named "Grenfell", this constituency was renamed Pheasant Hills in 1908, after a range of hills north of the Qu'Appelle River valley near Grenfell, Saskatchewan. The district was abolished before the 9th Saskatchewan general election in 1938 into Saltcoats and Melville.

It is now part of the constituencies of Moosomin, Last Mountain-Touchwood, and Melville-Saltcoats.

== Members of the Legislative Assembly ==
#	MLA	Served	Party
1.	Andrew William Argue	1905 – 1908	Provincial Rights
2.	Henry Hayes Willway	1908 – 1912	Provincial Rights
3.	Andrew B. A. Cunningham	1912 – 1917	Liberal
4.	James Arthur Smith	1917 – 1929	Liberal
5.	Charles Morton Dunn	1929 – 1934	Liberal
6.	Asmundur A. Loptson	1934 – 1938	Liberal

== Election results ==
1905 Saskatchewan general election: Grenfell electoral district
Party	Candidate	Votes	%	±%
Provincial Rights	Andrew William Argue	691	51.72%	–
Liberal	Christopher John Rosborough	645	48.28%	–
Total		1,336	100.00%	

1908 Saskatchewan general election: Pheasant Hills electoral district
Party	Candidate	Votes	%	±%
Provincial Rights	Henry Hayes Willway	828	56.95%	+5.23
Liberal	Hugh Wallace Lindsay	626	43.05%	-5.23
Total		1,454	100.00%	

1912 Saskatchewan general election: Pheasant Hills electoral district
Party	Candidate	Votes	%	±%
Liberal	Andrew B. A. Cunningham	1,143	57.90%	+14.85
Conservative	Henry Hayes Willway	831	42.10%	-14.85
Total		1,974	100.00%	

1917 Saskatchewan general election: Pheasant Hills electoral district
Party	Candidate	Votes	%	±%
Liberal	James Arthur Smith	2,416	68.75%	+10.85
Conservative	William C. Arnold	1,098	31.25%	-10.85
Total		3,514	100.00%	

1921 Saskatchewan general election: Pheasant Hills electoral district
Party	Candidate	Votes	%	±%
Liberal	James Arthur Smith	1,590	46.27%	-22.48
Independent	Hugh Wallace Lindsay	1,052	30.62%	–
Independent	William Howland Blyth	794	23.11%	–
Total		3,436	100.00%	

1925 Saskatchewan general election: Pheasant Hills electoral district
Party	Candidate	Votes	%	±%
Liberal	James Arthur Smith	2,077	52.36%	+6.09
Independent	Samuel Howard Potter	1,890	47.64%	-
Total		3,967	100.00%	

1929 Saskatchewan general election: Pheasant Hills electoral district
Party	Candidate	Votes	%	±%
Liberal	Charles Morton Dunn	3,007	53.15%	+0.79
Independent	John William Redgwick	2,650	46.85%	-0.79
Total		5,657	100.00%	

1934 Saskatchewan general election: Pheasant Hills electoral district
Party	Candidate	Votes	%	±%
Liberal	Asmundur A. Loptson	4,310	57.64%	+4.49
Farmer-Labour	H.J. Benson	1,804	24.13%	–
Conservative	Chris Ness	1,363	18.23%	-
Total		7,477	100.00%	

== See also ==
- List of Saskatchewan provincial electoral districts
- List of Saskatchewan general elections
- Canadian provincial electoral districts
