= Batoche (former electoral district) =

Former provincial electoral district in Saskatchewan, Canada

Coordinates: 52°45′N 105°45′W

Batoche was a provincial electoral district for the Legislative Assembly of Saskatchewan, Canada. It was located in north central Saskatchewan, and was one of the original 25 electoral districts formed when the province was created in 1905. The electoral district was replaced before the next general election in 1908, and was redistributed into Duck Lake, Vonda, Hanley, Saskatoon County, and Arm River. Prior to the creation of the province, the riding existed as an electoral district of the North-West Territories.

A new district of the same name was created in 2002.

== Member of the Legislative Assembly ==
| # | MLA | Served | Party |
|---|---|---|---|
| 1. | William M. Grant | 1905 - 1908 | Liberal |

== Election results ==
Saskatchewan General Election 1905: Batoche
| Party | Candidate | Votes | % | ±% |
|---|---|---|---|---|
| Liberal | William M. Grant | 672 | 85.17 | |
| Provincial Rights | Jean Baptiste Boucher | 117 | 14.82 | |
| Total | | 789 | 100.00 | |

== See also ==
- List of Saskatchewan provincial electoral districts
- List of Saskatchewan general elections
- Canadian provincial electoral districts
