= Meadow Lake =

Meadow Lake may refer to:

== Lakes ==
=== Canada ===
- Meadow Lake (Saskatchewan)

=== United States ===
- Meadow Lake (Idaho), a glacial lake in Boise County
- Meadow Lake (Queens), in Flushing Meadows-Corona Park, New York
- Meadow Lake (Texas), a reservoir on the Guadalupe River

== Other uses ==
=== Canada ===
- Meadow Lake, Saskatchewan, a city in the province's northwest
- Meadow Lake (provincial electoral district), represented in the Legislative Assembly of Saskatchewan
- Meadow Lake (electoral district), a Saskatchewan area represented in the Canadian House of Commons, 1948-1979
- Rural Municipality of Meadow Lake No. 588, Saskatchewan
- Meadow Lake Power Station, a power station in Saskatchewan
- Meadow Lake Provincial Park, a park in Saskatchewan

=== United States ===
- Meadow Lake, Nevada County, California
- Meadow Lake, New Mexico
- Meadow Lake Wind Farm, a wind farm in Indiana

== See also ==
- Meadow Lake Airport (disambiguation)
- Meadow Lakes (disambiguation)
