= Rural Municipality of Spiritwood No. 496 =

Rural municipality in Saskatchewan, Canada

Spiritwood No. 496
- Rural municipality
- Rural Municipality of Spiritwood No. 496
- Location of the RM of Spiritwood No. 496 in Saskatchewan
- Coordinates: 53.498°N 107.598°W
- Country: Canada
- Province: Saskatchewan
- Census division: 16
- SARM division: 6
- Formed: December 9, 1929
- Amalgamated: December 31, 1953 (with RM of Shell lake No. 495)

Government
  - Reeve: Shirley Dauvin
  - Governing body: RM of Spiritwood No. 496 Council
  - Administrator: Colette Bussiere
  - Office location: Spiritwood

Area (2016)
  - Land: 2,392.86 km^{2} (923.89 sq mi)

Population (2016)
  - Total: 1,347
  - Density: 0.6/km^{2} (1.6/sq mi)
- Time zone: CST
  - Summer (DST): CST
- Area codes: 306 and 639

The Rural Municipality of Spiritwood No. 496 (2016 population: 1,347) is a rural municipality (RM) in the Canadian province of Saskatchewan within Census Division No. 16 and SARM Division No. 6. Located in the north-central portion of the province, it is west of the City of Prince Albert.

== History ==
The RM of Spiritwood No. 496 incorporated as a rural municipality on December 9, 1929. It absorbed the RM of Shell Lake No. 495. The RM of Shell Lake No. 495 was originally named the RM of Shell River No. 495 prior to November 30, 1935.

== Geography ==
The RM of Spiritwood No. 496 is adjacent to the RMs of Big River No. 555 to the north, Medstead No. 497 to the west, Meeting Lake No. 466 to the south, and Canwood No. 494 (formerly Thompson No. 494) to the south.

=== Communities and localities ===
The following urban municipalities are surrounded by the RM.

Towns

- Spiritwood

Villages

- Shell Lake

Resort villages

- Echo Bay
- Big Shell

The following unincorporated communities are within the RM.

Organized hamlets

- Spruce Bay

Localities

- Bapaume
- Capasin
- Leoville
- Mildred
- Norbury
- Penn
- Ranger

The RM also surrounds the Witchekan Lake First Nation Reserves and Pelican Lake First Nation Reserves (191, 191A, 191B, 191C).

== Demographics ==
Population history (1981–2016)
Year	Pop.	±%
1981	1,949	—
1986	1,799	−7.7%
1991	1,694	−5.8%
1996	1,504	−11.2%
2001	1,429	−5.0%
2006	1,277	−10.6%
2011	1,382	+8.2%
2016	1,347	−2.5%
Source: Statistics Canada via Saskatchewan Bureau of Statistics

In the 2021 Census of Population conducted by Statistics Canada, the RM of Spiritwood No. 496 had a population of 1,245 living in 528 of its 810 total private dwellings, a change of 1.8% from its 2016 population of 1,223. With a land area of 2,371.04 km^{2} (915.46 sq mi), it had a population density of 0.5/km^{2} (1.4/sq mi) in 2021.

In the 2016 Census of Population, the RM of Spiritwood No. 496 recorded a population of 1,347 living in 516 of its 786 total private dwellings, a −0.1% change from its 2011 population of 1,349. With a land area of 2,392.86 km^{2} (923.89 sq mi), it had a population density of 0.6/km^{2} (1.5/sq mi) in 2016.

== Government ==
The RM of Spiritwood No. 496 is governed by an elected municipal council and an appointed administrator that meets on the second Tuesday of every month. The reeve of the RM is Shirley Dauvin while its administrator is Colette Bussiere. The RM's office is located in Spiritwood.

== Transportation ==
Rail

- Big River Branch C.N.R—serves Prince Albert, Shellbrook, Clonfert, Canwood, Polwarth, Mattes, Debden, Eldred, Dumble, Bodmin, Big River.

Roads

- Highway 24—serves Spiritwood and Leoville
- Highway 3—intersects Highway 24 and serves Belbutte, Spiritwood and Shell Lake
- Highway 793—intersects Highway 24 and serves Big River
- Highway 696—intersects Highway 24 and serves Pelican Lake First Nation Indian Reserve 191B
- Highway 3—runs east west and intersects Highway 24 and serves Spiritwood and Mildred
- Highway 378—runs north south and intersects Highway 3 south of Spiritwood

== See also ==
- List of rural municipalities in Saskatchewan
