= Alphonse Peter Weber =

Canadian politician

MLA for Meadow Lake
- In office 14 February 1957 – 4 May 1960
- Preceded by: Hugh Clifford Dunfield
- Succeeded by: Martin Semchuk

Personal details
- Born: 1904 St. Leo, Minnesota
- Died: 1 October 1963 (aged 58–59) Meadow Lake, Saskatchewan
- Party: Social Credit Party of Saskatchewan

Alphonse Peter Weber (1904 – 1 October 1963) was a Canadian politician from the province of Saskatchewan who represented the constituency of Meadow Lake from 1956–1960.

== Personal life ==
Weber was born in St. Leo, Minnesota, United States. Weber was educated at Muenster in Saskatchewan and lived at Meadow Lake from 1942. He worked as an elevator agent. He was also a member of the local Rotary Club and a member of the Knights of Columbus.

== Political career ==
Weber was elected and served on the Town Council of Meadow Lake for six years, four of which as Mayor. Weber represented Meadow Lake on the Legislative Assembly of Saskatchewan as a member of the Social Credit Party of Saskatchewan. He defeated the incumbent Liberal Hugh Clifford Dunfield.

== Death ==
Weber died in Meadow Lake, Saskatchewan.

== Electoral record ==
1956 Saskatchewan General Election
Party	Candidate	Votes	%
Social Credit	Alphonse Peter Weber	2,425	45.22
Liberal	Hugh Clifford Dunfield	1,501	27.99
Co-operative Commonwealth	Frank G. Warick	1,437	26.79
Total valid votes		5,363	
Social Credit gain			
Source: Saskatchewan Archives Board
