= Chitek Lake =

Chitek Lake may refer to any of the following:

- Chitek Lake (Saskatchewan), a lake in Saskatchewan, Canada
  - Chitek Lake Recreation Site, a park on Chitek Lake in Saskatchewan
- Chitek Lake, Saskatchewan, a resort village in Saskatchewan
- Chitek Lake 191, an Indian reserve in Saskatchewan
- Chitek Lake Anishinaabe Provincial Park, a park in Manitoba, Canada

== See also ==
- Chitek, a community in Saskatchewan
