= Saskatchewan Highway 24 =

Provincial highway in Saskatchewan, Canada

Highway 24
- Highway 24 highlighted in red

Route information
- Maintained by Ministry of Highways and Infrastructure
- Length: 57.5 km (35.7 mi)

Major junctions
- South end: Highway 3 in Spiritwood
- Highway 946 in Leoville; Highway 945 near Chitek Lake
- North end: Chitek Lake

Location
- Country: Canada
- Province: Saskatchewan
- Rural municipalities: Spiritwood, Big River

Highway system
- Provincial highways in Saskatchewan
← Highway 23	→ Highway 25

Highway 24 is a provincial highway in the Canadian province of Saskatchewan. It runs from Highway 3 at Spiritwood north to the community of Chitek Lake on Chitek Lake. Highway 24 is about 57.5 kilometres (35.7 mi) long.

In April 2014, due to its state of disrepair, Highway 24 was named the worst highway in Saskatchewan by the Canadian Automobile Association (CAA). In 2021, repairs began on the highway as part of a plan to stimulate the local economy. A total of 50 kilometres (31 mi) were rebuilt.

== Route description ==
Highway 24 generally travels in a north–south direction. Its northern terminus is at the community of Chitek Lake while the southern one is south of Witchekan Lake at Spiritwood and Highway 3. The highway provides access to the Chitek Lake Recreation Site and the communities of Laventure, Leoville, and Penn. Intersections along Highway 24 include Highways 793, 696, and 945.

== Major intersections ==
Rural municipality	Location	km	mi	Destinations	Notes
Spiritwood No. 496	Spiritwood	0.0	0.0	Highway 3 (Railway Avenue E) – Prince Albert, Glaslyn	Western terminus
Spiritwood No. 496		3.3	2.1	Bridge over Norbury Creek	
Spiritwood No. 496		24.1	15.0	Bridge over the Big River	
Spiritwood No. 496		29.0	18.0	Highway 793 east – Debden, Big River First Nation	Western terminus of Hwy 793
Spiritwood No. 496	Leoville	32.2	20.0	Highway 946 north (Main Street) – Leoville	Southern terminus of Hwy 946
Spiritwood No. 496		40.0– 40.6	24.9– 25.2	Highway 696 south – Ranger	Northern terminus of Hwy 696
Big River No. 555		52.5	32.6	Highway 945 north – Meadow Lake	Southern terminus of Hwy 945
Big River No. 555		52.9	32.9	Pelican Lake First Nation	Access road into First Nation
Big River No. 555	Chitek Lake	56.9	35.4	Chitek Lake Recreation Site	Access road into park
Big River No. 555	Chitek Lake	57.5	35.7	Dead end on Chitek Lake shoreline	End of provincial maintenance; northern terminus
1.000 mi = 1.609 km; 1.000 km = 0.621 mi

== See also ==
- Transportation in Saskatchewan
- Roads in Saskatchewan
