= Saskatchewan Highway 945 =

Provincial highway in Saskatchewan, Canada

Highway 945

Route information
- Maintained by Ministry of Highways and Infrastructure
- Length: 25 km (16 mi)

Major junctions
- South end: Highway 24 near Chitek Lake
- North end: Highway 943 near Island Lake

Location
- Country: Canada
- Province: Saskatchewan

Highway system
- Provincial highways in Saskatchewan
← Highway 943	→ Highway 946

Highway 945 is a provincial highway in the Canadian province of Saskatchewan. It runs from Highway 24 near Chitek Lake to Highway 943 near Island Lake. It is about 25 kilometres (16 mi) long. The highway provides access to several provincial recreational sites.

== Recreation sites ==
Provincial recreation sites accessed from Highway 945 include Shell Lake, Chitek Lake, Bug Lake, Lac Eauclaire, and Island Lake.

Bug Lake Recreation Site (53.9098°N 107.7284°W) includes a boat launch at the eastern end of Bug Lake.

== See also ==
- Roads in Saskatchewan
- Transportation in Saskatchewan
