= Hugh Clifford Dunfield =

Canadian politician

Hugh Clifford Dunfield (April 2, 1891 – March 11, 1973) was a rancher, heating contractor and political figure in Saskatchewan. He represented Meadow Lake from 1952 to 1956 in the Legislative Assembly of Saskatchewan as a Liberal.

He was born in Headingley, Manitoba, the son of John Dunfield and Mary McKillop, and was educated in Winnipeg, attending Wesley Methodist College. Dunfield came to Meadow Lake, Saskatchewan in 1915. In 1918, he married Ella Carrigill. He was a supervisor for the Meadow Lake Indian Reserve and served on the local hospital board, the school board and the Board of Trade. Dunfield was also a justice of the peace and was mayor of Meadow Lake from 1958 to 1960. He was defeated by Alphonse Peter Weber when he ran for reelection in 1956.
