= Martin Semchuk =

Canadian politician

Martin Semchuk (August 20, 1914 – November 15, 2000) was a merchant and political figure in Saskatchewan. He represented Meadow Lake from 1960 to 1964 in the Legislative Assembly of Saskatchewan as a Co-operative Commonwealth Federation (CCF) member.

He was born in Meath Park, Saskatchewan, the son of Bill Semchuk, and was educated in Prince Albert. In 1935, he married Josephine Mary Gerlowski. Semchuk was president of the Meadow Lake Board of Trade and was a director of the Saskatchewan Chamber of Commerce. He also helped create Meadow Lake Provincial Park. Semchuk operated a grocery store in Meadow Lake. He served in the provincial cabinet as Minister of Telephones, Minister of Public Health, Minister of Highways and Transportation and Minister of Industry and Commerce. He was defeated by Henry Coupland when he ran for reelection to the provincial assembly in 1964, and defeated again in 1967 after running as the NDP candidate. Semchuk later worked with the Saskatchewan Department of Natural Resources in Regina. In 1975, he retired to Kelowna, British Columbia. Semchuk died in Oliver, British Columbia at the age of 86.

Semchuk helped establish the first winter road to Uranium City during the 1950s. When a permanent road was established in 1980, it was named the Semchuk Trail in his honour.
