= Bapaume (disambiguation) =

Bapaume is a commune in the Pas-de-Calais department in the Hauts-de-France region of northern France.

Bapaume can also refer to:

- Bapaume, Queensland, rural locality in Australia
- Bapaume, Saskatchewan, unincorporated community in Canada
- French aviso Bapaume, French aviso commissioned in 1919
