= Henry Ethelbert Coupland =

Canadian politician

Henry Ethelbert "Hal" Coupland (December 28, 1915 – December 26, 1994) was a farmer, business owner and political figure in Saskatchewan. He represented Meadow Lake from 1964 to 1975 in the Legislative Assembly of Saskatchewan as a Liberal.

He was born in Yorkton, Saskatchewan, the son of Russell Ethelbert Coupland and Mary Boyes, and was educated there and in Prelate. In the early 1930s, Coupland moved with his family to a homestead at Golden Ridge. He married Ina Maxime Campbell in 1940. Coupland farmed near Goodsoil for several years and then moved to Hamilton, Ontario. He returned to the Dunfield district and then moved to Meadow Lake, where he worked for the Pioneer Grain Company. Coupland then operated a feed mill, then a chick hatchery and, later, a real estate and insurance company. He also served as chairman of the Golden Ridge school board and as a member of the town council for Meadow Lake. Coupland ran unsuccessfully for a seat in the provincial assembly in 1960 before being elected in 1964. He was defeated by Gordon McNeill when he ran for reelection in 1975. He ran again unsuccessfully in 1978 for the Athabasca seat in the Saskatchewan assembly. Coupland served as mayor of Meadow Lake from 1976 to 1980. He died in Meadow Lake Union Hospital at the age of 78.
