= Shell Lake (Saskatchewan) =

Lake in Saskatchewan, Canada

- Location in Saskatchewan Shell Lake (Canada)
- Location: RM of Big River No. 555, Saskatchewan
- Coordinates: 53.8268°N 107.6005°W
- Part of: Churchill River drainage basin
- Primary outflows: Tea Creek
- Basin countries: Canada
- Surface area: 152.9 ha (378 acres)
- Max. depth: 4.6 m (15 ft)
- Shore length^{1}: 10.6 km (6.6 mi)
- Surface elevation: 577 m (1,893 ft)
- ^{1} Shore length is not a well-defined measure.

Shell Lake is a small lake in the Canadian province of Saskatchewan. It is east of Chitek Lake in the Beaver River drainage basin. The primary inflow comes from Lac Huard, which is to the south. From the northern end of the lake, Tea Creek flows out and to the north. Tea Creek is joined by several smaller creeks en route to the northern end of Green Lake. Green River flows out of the northern end of Green Lake and into Beaver River.

== Shell Lake Recreation Site ==
Shell Lake Recreation Site (53.8275°N 107.6078°W) is a provincial recreation site on the western shore of Shell Lake. The park features a small campground and a boat launch for fishing. Northern pike and perch are fish commonly found in the lake. Access to the park is from Highway 945.

== See also ==
- List of lakes of Saskatchewan
- Tourism in Saskatchewan
