= Pelican Lake 191D =

Indian reserve in Saskatchewan, Canada

Coordinates: 54°11′27″N 108°17′48″W

- Indian reserve
- Pelican Lake Indian Reserve No. 191D
- Location in Saskatchewan
- First Nation: Pelican Lake
- Country: Canada
- Province: Saskatchewan

Area
  - Total: 62.9 ha (155 acres)

Pelican Lake 191D is an Indian reserve of the Pelican Lake First Nation in Saskatchewan. It is about 11 kilometres (6.8 mi) north-east of Meadow Lake.

== See also ==
- List of Indian reserves in Saskatchewan
