= Herschel Lee Howell =

Canadian educator and politician

Herschel Lee Howell (January 13, 1912 – February 27, 1990) was an educator and political figure in Saskatchewan. He represented Meadow Lake from 1944 to 1948 in the Legislative Assembly of Saskatchewan as a Co-operative Commonwealth Federation (CCF) member.

He was born in Copetown, Ontario and came west with his family in 1925 to settle on a homestead near Tako, Saskatchewan. Howell continued his studies at Bedford Road Collegiate in Saskatoon. He worked for a while in Medstead and then enrolled in the Saskatoon Normal School in 1934. Howell taught school for number of years and then graduated from the University of Saskatchewan in 1940, receiving an M.A. the following year. Howell then became principal of the Meadow Lake school. He was defeated by Bill Lofts when he ran for reelection to the provincial assembly in 1948. After leaving politics, he was principal of Battleford Central Collegiate. He died in Vancouver, British Columbia at the age of 78.
