= Brenda Martin =

Brenda Kim Martin is a Canadian citizen from Trenton, Ontario, whose arrest and conviction in Mexico was subject of much publicity in Canada. Martin began living in Mexico in 1998, working in the culinary industry, allegedly without a visa. In 2006, she was arrested on fraud charges related to a former employer, Alyn Waage. She remained in custody awaiting disposition of her case for two years. The trial and subsequent decision were pushed forward by intervention of the Canadian government and public. Throughout the proceedings, she maintained that she was innocent of the charges and was not implicated by the ring leader, Alyn Waage, who is incarcerated for the fraud in the United States.

She was found guilty based on evidence suggesting she knowingly accepted illicit funds from her former boss, Alyn Waage, with whom she had a close relationship. She was sentenced to five years in jail without parole and received a fine. After being transferred to Canada, she was granted full parole.

== Arrest ==
While Martin was employed by Waage, he was running an internet fraud pyramid scheme, the "Tri-West Investment Club", which defrauded 15,000 victims of more than US$60 million. Following a joint investigation by US, Canadian, and Costa Rican police, he was arrested and charged with fraud in 2006. After fleeing Mexico while on bail, he was re-arrested in Costa Rica and is now serving a 10-year sentence in the United States. Co-conspirators Keith Nordick and Michael Webb were also convicted of related offences.

The PGR (Mexican Federal District Attorney office) believed Martin had participated in the fraud and arrested her in 2006. Martin claims she never realized there was something wrong going on. Waage gave sworn evidence that she was unaware of his illegal activities and stated that the Mexican authorities held her to maintain leverage over him. In his affidavit he did admit that Martin had worked for him for five months but never stated he had given her a year's severance for being fired. He explained the money sent as a return of her fiancé's investment in his scheme, since as a Mexican resident he could not invest.

Because Martin faced federal charges considered serious felonies in Mexico, and because she was a foreigner, Mexican law prevented her release on bail. As a result, she remained in custody while awaiting trial.

== Trial and conviction ==
Trials in Mexico are conducted in a written rather than oral format, which can make them proceed slower than trials in Martin's native Canada. In addition, all the paperwork had to be translated by a certified translator for Brenda to be conscious of her process. Largely because of her long wait in prison, Martin experienced emotional stress and was the focus of a great deal of media attention in Canada.

Martin's lawyer, Mr. Guillermo Cruz Rico, attempted a constitutional challenge against the prosecution, claiming lack of assistance by an official interpreter when Brenda Martin was charged and deficiency in the evidence against her. According to Mexican officials, this had the effect of delaying a verdict; but this allegation did not have basis either in the Amparo Law or the jurisprudence produced by the Supreme Court of Mexico.

On April 14, 2008 Martin faced her final hearing before Judge Nuñez from the 7th federal district in the Puente Grande prison complex and court house. It was a summary hearing in which more than 26,000-page Waage file was presented. Mexican law states that a judge must deliver a sentence within 10 working days of the last hearing if the file is 500 pages or less. For files 501 pages or more, each 100 pages adds one working day up to a total of 30 days. Brenda Martin asked the judge to deliver her sentence in four days (by April 18). Judge Nuñez answered that he was not obligated by law to meet her demands, but would do his best to deliver his verdict as soon as possible.

=== Conviction ===
On April 22, 2008, Judge Nuñez announced that Martin was guilty. Martin was sentenced to a minimum of five years with no chance of parole, and was fined 35,850 Mexican pesos (approximately CAD3,441). In his decision, Judge Nuñez ruled that Martin did know that the money she received from Allan Waage came from the proceeds of an internet scam and were therefore illicit funds.

== Transfer from Mexico ==
Martin applied for a prisoner transfer to serve out her time in Canada. On May 1, 2008, Martin was transferred in a government-chartered jet from the Mexican prison she was held in, back to Canada. Additionally, in order to expedite the transfer, the Canadian government paid the C$3,441 fine (35,850 pesos) imposed by the judge that presided over her case. MP Jason Kenney said the fine was paid through a special fund the Foreign Affairs Department has for distressed Canadians abroad. Though initially she was remanded into custody at the Grand Valley Institution for Women in Kitchener, Ontario, she was immediately eligible for parole as she had already served more than one third of her sentence in Mexico. On May 9, 2008, Martin was released on parole from the Canadian prison into her mother's custody.

== Public response ==
Canadian MP Bill Casey called for a boycott of Mexico in response to her treatment.

Despite the predominantly partial media coverage of Martin's plight and sympathy from several high-ranking politicians, her story received much attention from the general Canadian public and other countries as well, including prestigious publications such as The Economist.

== Other legal troubles ==
Martin was convicted of drunk driving in the 1980s. Martin was arrested again in early January 2010 for public intoxication.
