= Donald MacDonald (Saskatchewan politician, born 1886) =

Canadian politician (1886–1970)

Donald MacDonald (1886 – 7 December 1970) was a Canadian Liberal politician from the province of Saskatchewan. He represented Meadow Lake on the Legislative Assembly of Saskatchewan from 1934 to 1944.

== Early life ==
MacDonald was born in Listowel, Ontario. In 1916 he enlisted in the Lord Strathcona's Horse.
