= Pelican Lake 191A =

Indian reserve in Saskatchewan, Canada

Coordinates: 53°38′56″N 107°51′38″W

- Indian reserve
- Pelican Lake Indian Reserve No. 191A
- Location in Saskatchewan
- First Nation: Pelican Lake
- Country: Canada
- Province: Saskatchewan

Area
  - Total: 3,145.9 ha (7,774 acres)

Population (2016)
  - Total: 20
  - Density: 0.64/km^{2} (1.6/sq mi)

Pelican Lake 191A is an Indian reserve of the Pelican Lake First Nation in Saskatchewan. It is 66 kilometres southeast of Meadow Lake. In the 2016 Canadian Census, it recorded a population of 20 living in 3 of its 6 total private dwellings.
