= Saskatchewan Highway 942 =

Provincial highway in Saskatchewan, Canada

Highway 942
- Cowan Lake Road

Route information
- Maintained by Ministry of Highways and Infrastructure
- Length: 56 km (35 mi)

Major junctions
- South end: Highway 55 near Bodmin
- Highway 943 near Big River
- North end: Local road

Location
- Country: Canada
- Province: Saskatchewan

Highway system
- Provincial highways in Saskatchewan
← Highway 941	→ Highway 943

Highway 942, also known as Cowan Lake Road, is a provincial highway in the north-west region of the Canadian province of Saskatchewan. It runs from Highway 55 near Bodmin until it downgrades into a local road bound for Roberts Lake. The highway passes near the town of Big River, and also intersects Highway 943. It is about 56 kilometres (35 mi) long.

== See also ==
- Roads in Saskatchewan
- Transportation in Saskatchewan
