= Saskatchewan Highway 943 =

Provincial highway in Saskatchewan, Canada

Highway 943

Route information
- Maintained by Ministry of Highways and Infrastructure
- Length: 85.3 km (53.0 mi)

Major junctions
- West end: Highway 698 / Highway 799
- Highway 945; Highway 946
- East end: Highway 942 near Big River

Location
- Country: Canada
- Province: Saskatchewan

Highway system
- Provincial highways in Saskatchewan
← Highway 942	→ Highway 945

Highway 943 is a provincial highway in the north-west region of the Canadian province of Saskatchewan. It runs from the Flying Dust 105F Indian reserve near the junctions of Highway 698 and Highway 799 to Highway 942 north-west of Big River. It is about 85 kilometres (53 mi) long.

Highway 943 intersects Highway 945 and Highway 946, as well as an access road to the Island Lake Recreation Site on Island Lake.

== See also ==
- Roads in Saskatchewan
- Transportation in Saskatchewan
