= Meadow Lake (provincial electoral district) =

Provincial electoral district in Saskatchewan, Canada

Coordinates: 53°50′N 108°10′W

Saskatchewan electoral district

Provincial electoral district
- Legislature: Legislative Assembly of Saskatchewan
MLA
Jeremy Harrison
Saskatchewan
- District created: 1934
- First contested: 1934
- Last contested: 2020

Demographics
- Electors: 9,638
- Census subdivision: Meadow Lake

Meadow Lake is a provincial electoral district for the Legislative Assembly of Saskatchewan, Canada. Incorporated as a city in 2009, Meadow Lake (pop. 5,045) is the largest centre in the constituency. The riding was last contested in the 2020 election, when incumbent Saskatchewan Party MLA Jeremy Harrison was re-elected.

Smaller communities in the riding include the villages of Green Lake, Loon Lake, Leoville, and Goodsoil; and the town of St. Walburg.

== History ==
The riding was first contested in the 1934 general election. From the 1952 general election until the 1971 general election, Meadow Lake also included the remote far northwest corner of the province, including the northern villages of Île-à-la-Crosse and La Loche. About half of this northern area was transferred back to Athabasca prior to the 1971 election, and the remainder transferred 1975 general election, finalizing Meadow Lake's present northern boundary.

The most recent major boundary change took place before the 2003 general election, when the riding was shifted eastward to take in the northwestern third of the former Shellbrook-Spiritwood constituency, losing its western portion (including Pierceland and the border with Alberta) to Lloydminster. Aside from minor adjustments before the 2016 general election, the district's boundaries have remained largely the same since 2003.

== Members of the Legislative Assembly ==
Legislature	Years	Member	Party
8th	1934–1938	Donald MacDonald	Saskatchewan Liberal Party
9th	1939–1944	Donald MacDonald	Saskatchewan Liberal Party
10th	1944–1948	Herschel Lee Howell	Co-operative Commonwealth Federation
11th	1949–1952	William Thorneycroft Lofts	Saskatchewan Liberal Party
12th	1953–1956	Hugh Clifford Dunfield	Saskatchewan Liberal Party
13th	1957–1960	Alphonse Peter Weber	Social Credit Party of Saskatchewan
14th	1961–1964	Martin Semchuk	Co-operative Commonwealth Federation
15th	1965–1967	Henry Ethelbert Coupland	Saskatchewan Liberal Party
16th	1968–1971	Henry Ethelbert Coupland	Saskatchewan Liberal Party
17th	1971–1975	Henry Ethelbert Coupland	Saskatchewan Liberal Party
18th	1975–1978	Gordon James McNeill	New Democratic
19th	1979–1982	George Malcolm McLeod	Progressive Conservative
20th	1982–1986	George Malcolm McLeod	Progressive Conservative
21st	1986–1991	George Malcolm McLeod	Progressive Conservative
22nd	1991–1995	Maynard Sonntag	New Democratic
23rd	1995–1999	Maynard Sonntag	New Democratic
24th	1999–2003	Maynard Sonntag	New Democratic
25th	2003–2007	Maynard Sonntag	New Democratic
26th	2007–2011	Jeremy Harrison	Saskatchewan Party
27th	2011–2016	Jeremy Harrison	Saskatchewan Party
28th	2016–2020	Jeremy Harrison	Saskatchewan Party
29th	2020–2024	Jeremy Harrison	Saskatchewan Party
30th	2024–present	Jeremy Harrison	Saskatchewan Party

== Election results ==
2024 Saskatchewan general election
** Preliminary results — Not yet official **
Party	Candidate	Votes	%	±%
Saskatchewan	Jeremy Harrison	4,010	62.49	-9.0
New Democratic	Miles Nachbaur	2,010	31.32	+5.5
Saskatchewan United	Denis Allchurch	296	4.61	
Green	Candice Turner	101	1.57	-1.1
Total valid votes		6,417	99.70	
Total rejected ballots		19	0.30	
Turnout		6,436		
Eligible voters		–		
Source: Elections Saskatchewan
Saskatchewan hold		Swing		–7.3

2020 provincial election redistributed results
Party	%
Saskatchewan	71.5
New Democratic	25.8
Green	2.7

2020 Saskatchewan general election
Party	Candidate	Votes	%	±%
Saskatchewan	Jeremy Harrison	4,540	71.63	+1.77
New Democratic	Harmonie King	1,627	25.67	+2.75
Green	Carol Vandale	171	2.70	+0.99
Total valid votes		6,338	99.61	
Total rejected ballots		25	0.39	–
Turnout		6,363	–	–
Eligible voters		–		
Saskatchewan hold		Swing		–
Source: Elections Saskatchewan, Global News

2016 Saskatchewan general election
Party	Candidate	Votes	%	±%
Saskatchewan	Jeremy Harrison	4,395	70.46	+8.49
New Democratic	Dwayne Lasas	1,430	22.92	-13.77
Liberal	Eric McCrimmon	305	4.89	-
Green	Eric Schalm	107	1.71	+0.37
Total valid votes		6,237	100.0	
Eligible voters		–		
Saskatchewan hold		Swing		-
Source: Elections Saskatchewan, Global News

2011 Saskatchewan general election
Party	Candidate	Votes	%	±%
Saskatchewan	Jeremy Harrison	4,207	61.97	+13.11
New Democratic	Helen Ben	2,491	36.69	-11.66
Green	Susan Merasty	91	1.34	*
Total		6,789	100.00	
Saskatchewan hold		Swing		-

2007 Saskatchewan general election
Party	Candidate	Votes	%	±%
Saskatchewan	Jeremy Harrison	3,507	48.86	+4.59
New Democratic	Maynard Sonntag	3,471	48.35	-1.92
Liberal	Don Coupland	200	2.79	-2.67
Total		7,178	100.00	
Saskatchewan gain from New Democratic		Swing		-

2003 Saskatchewan general election
Party	Candidate	Votes	%	±%
New Democratic	Maynard Sonntag	3,472	50.27	+3.54
Saskatchewan	Ron Dosdall	3,058	44.27	+2.85
Liberal	Don Coupland	377	5.46	-6.39
Total		6,907	100.00	

1999 Saskatchewan general election
Party	Candidate	Votes	%	±%
New Democratic	Maynard Sonntag	2,846	46.73	-1.47
Saskatchewan	Bob Young	2,523	41.42	*
Liberal	Don Coupland	722	11.85	-24.39
Total		6,091	100.00	

1995 Saskatchewan general election
Party	Candidate	Votes	%	±%
New Democratic	Maynard Sonntag	2,910	48.20	-3.09
Liberal	Dennis Barnett	2,188	36.24	+29.80
Progressive Conservative	Paul S. Pospisil	939	15.56	-26.71
Total		6,037	100.00	

1991 Saskatchewan general election
Party	Candidate	Votes	%	±%
New Democratic	Maynard Sonntag	3,719	51.29	+16.33
Progressive Conservative	George McLeod	3,065	42.27	-17.15
Liberal	J. Burton Dougan	467	6.44	+0.82
Total		7,251	100.00	

1986 Saskatchewan general election
Party	Candidate	Votes	%	±%
Progressive Conservative	George McLeod	3,711	59.42	-2.74
New Democratic	Bill Krasicki	2,183	34.96	+3.43
Liberal	Henry Coupland	351	5.62	+3.70
Total		6,245	100.00	

1982 Saskatchewan general election
Party	Candidate	Votes	%	±%
Progressive Conservative	George McLeod	4,236	62.16	+14.60
New Democratic	Dave Bridger	2,149	31.53	-12.45
Western Canada Concept	Paul S. Pospisil	242	3.55	*
Liberal	R. Hugh Currie	131	1.92	-6.54
Independent	Ray L. Manegre	57	0.84	-
Total		6,815	100.00	

1978 Saskatchewan general election
Party	Candidate	Votes	%	±%
Progressive Conservative	George McLeod	3,016	47.56	+18.45
New Democratic	Gordon McNeill	2,789	43.98	+8.23
Liberal	Colin Campbell	537	8.46	-26.68
Total		6,342	100.00	

1975 Saskatchewan general election
Party	Candidate	Votes	%	±%
New Democratic	Gordon McNeill	2,094	35.75	-10.84
Liberal	Henry Coupland	2,058	35.14	-18.27
Progressive Conservative	Leo Jeannotte	1,705	29.11	-
Total		5,857	100.00	

1971 Saskatchewan general election
Party	Candidate	Votes	%	±%
Liberal	Henry Coupland	3,350	53.41	+10.68
New Democratic	Paul Kuffert	2,922	46.59	+5.76
Total		6,272	100.00	

1967 Saskatchewan general election
Party	Candidate	Votes	%	±%
Liberal	Henry Coupland	2,394	42.73	-7.44
New Democratic	Martin Semchuk	2,288	40.83	+7.16
Progressive Conservative	Leo Jeannotte	921	16.44	+0.28
Total		5,603	100.00	

1964 Saskatchewan general election
Party	Candidate	Votes	%	±%
Liberal	Henry Coupland	3,149	50.17	+20.84
Co-operative Commonwealth	Martin Semchuk	2,113	33.67	+1.73
Progressive Conservative	Fred L. Dunbar	1,014	16.16	-0.92
Total		6,276	100.00	

1960 Saskatchewan general election
Party	Candidate	Votes	%	±%
Co-operative Commonwealth	Martin Semchuk	1,834	31.94	+5.15
Liberal	Henry Coupland	1,684	29.33	+1.34
Social Credit	A. Peter Weber	1,243	21.65	-23.57
Progressive Conservative	Fred L. Dunbar	981	17.08	-
Total		5,742	100.00	

1956 Saskatchewan general election
Party	Candidate	Votes	%	±%
Social Credit	A. Peter Weber	2,425	45.22	+22.05
Liberal	H. Cliff Dunfield	1,501	27.99	-16.30
Co-operative Commonwealth	Frank G. Warick	1,437	26.79	-2.81
Total		5,363	100.00	

1952 Saskatchewan general election
Party	Candidate	Votes	%	±%
Liberal	H. Cliff Dunfield	2,653	44.29	-2.80
Co-operative Commonwealth	Gustav A. Malinowsky	1,773	29.60	-7.92
Social Credit	William A. McRae	1,388	23.17	+7.78
Independent	Louis M. Marion	176	2.94	*
Total		5,990	100.00	

1948 Saskatchewan general election
Party	Candidate	Votes	%	±%
Liberal	Bill Lofts	3,307	47.09	+10.38
Co-operative Commonwealth	Herschel L. Howell	2,635	37.52	-3.85
Social Credit	John W. Evanishen	1,081	15.39	-
Total		7,023	100.00	

1944 Saskatchewan general election
Party	Candidate	Votes	%	±%
Co-operative Commonwealth	Herschel L. Howell	2,034	41.37	+17.10
Liberal	Donald MacDonald	1,805	36.71	-6.21
Labour Progressive	Arthur J. Doucet	716	14.56	*
Progressive Conservative	William Titley	362	7.36	-
Total		4,917	100.00	

1938 Saskatchewan general election
Party	Candidate	Votes	%	±%
Liberal	Donald MacDonald	3,184	42.92	-17.84
Social Credit	Judson B. Clark	2,434	32.81	*
Co-operative Commonwealth	Robert C. Paul	1,800	24.27	+3.11
Total		7,418	100.00	

1934 Saskatchewan general election
Party	Candidate	Votes	%	±%
Liberal	Donald MacDonald	4,304	60.76	*
Farmer–Labour	Charles Mycroft	1,499	21.16	*
Conservative	J.H. Storry	1,281	18.08	*
Total		7,084	100.00	

== History ==
=== Members of the Legislative Assembly ===
#	MLA	Served	Party
1.	Donald MacDonald	1934–1944	Liberal
2.	Herschel L. Howell	1944–1948	CCF
3.	Bill Lofts	1948–1952	Liberal
4.	H. Cliff Dunfield	1952–1956	Liberal
5.	A. Peter Weber	1956–1960	Social Credit
6.	Martin Semchuk	1960–1964	CCF
7.	Henry Coupland	1964–1975	Liberal
8.	Gordon McNeill	1975–1978	NDP
9.	George McLeod	1978–1991	Prog. Conservative
10.	Maynard Sonntag	1991–2007	NDP
11.	Jeremy Harrison	2007–present	Saskatchewan Party

== See also ==
- List of Saskatchewan provincial electoral districts
- List of Saskatchewan general elections
- Canadian provincial electoral districts
