= William Bleasdell Cameron =

Canadian author (1862–1951)

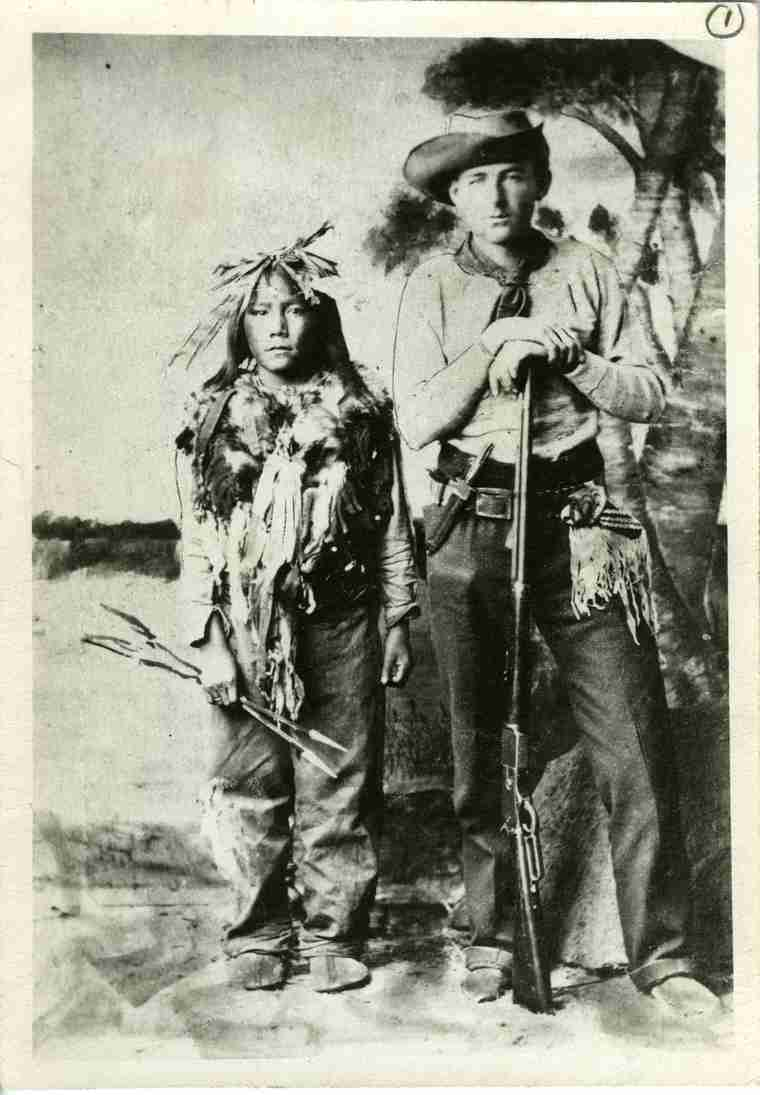
- Born: July 26, 1862; Trenton, Canada West
- Died: March 4, 1951 (aged 88); Meadow Lake, Saskatchewan
- Other name: Willie
- Known for: Survivor of the Frog Lake Massacre, writer, journalist
- Children: Jean Baptiste (JB) Cameron
- Parents: John Cameron (father); Agnes Emma Bleasdale (mother)

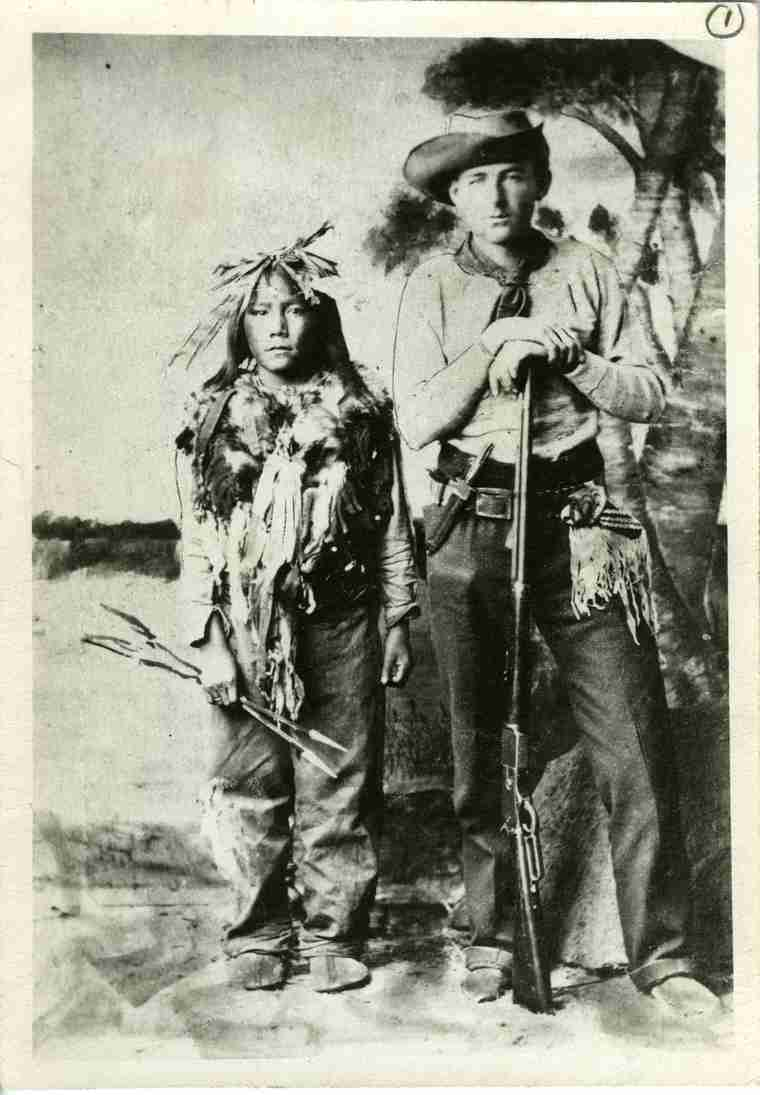
William Bleasdell Cameron, dressed in his outfit as guide and scout with the Alberta Field Force, with Horse Child, 12-year-old son of Big Bear. Horse Child was dressed up in Cameron's collection of Indian regalia for the photo. They were photographed together in Regina in 1885 during the trial of Big Bear. Cameron testified in Big Bear's defence.

William Bleasdell Cameron (1862–1951) was a Canadian author. He is best known as being one of the survivors of the Frog Lake Massacre, and his book The War Trail of Big Bear that recounts his experiences of the massacre and his captivity. He was born July 26, 1862, in Trenton, Canada West.

In 1885 he was working as a clerk for the Hudson's Bay Company store at Frog Lake in the District of Saskatchewan, North-West Territories. He survived the Frog Lake Massacre of the North-West Rebellion on April 2, 1885, and was held captive for two months by Big Bear's band of Cree.

After being freed he was attached to Major General Thomas Bland Strange's column and later was awarded the North West Canada Medal for his role as a scout and guide.(pages 51–52)

Cameron was in Regina in 1885 during the trial of Big Bear, where he testified in Big Bear's defence. He testified he had heard Big Bear try to stop the massacre at Frog Lake.

Cameron founded and edited the newspaper Vermilion Signal, served on the town council of Vermilion, Alberta, and was briefly editor of the magazine Field and Stream, New York.

He died in Meadow Lake, Saskatchewan, on March 4, 1951, of double pneumonia at age 88. The inscription on his headstone reads "G. Scout, William B. Cameron, Northwest Field Force, 4th March, 1951—Rest In Peace."(p. 155)

== Books ==
- Blood Red the Sun
- The War Trail of Big Bear
- A month in the United States and Canada in the autumn of 1873
- Eyewitness To History: William Bleasdell Cameron, Frontier Journalist
