= Trenton, Ontario =

Community in Ontario, Canada

Trenton
- Community
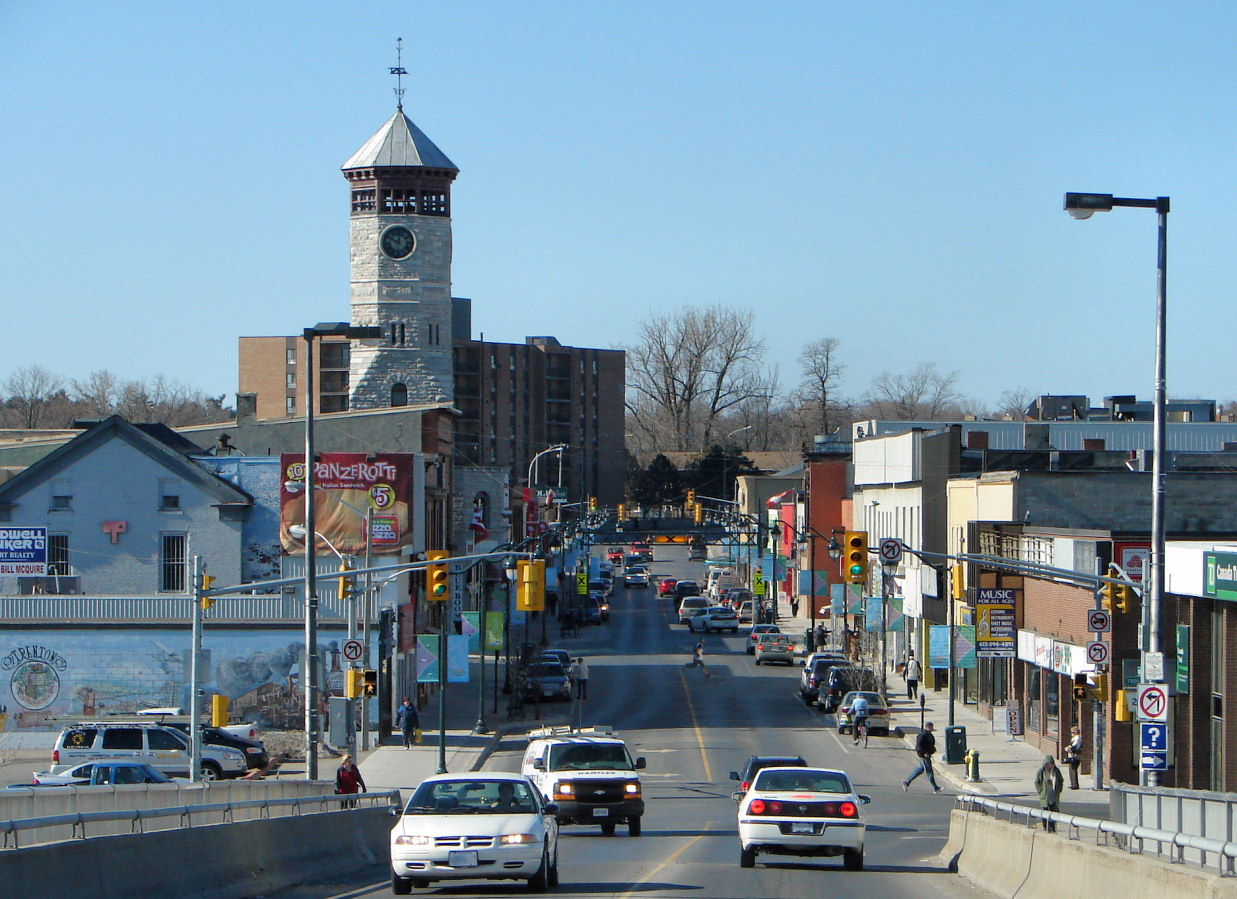

- Location of Trenton in Ontario
- Coordinates: 44°06′00″N 77°34′50″W
- Country: Canada
- Province: Ontario
- County: Hastings County
- Municipality: Quinte West
- Settled: 1784
- Incorporated: 1853 (village)
- Incorporated: 1880 (town)
- Incorporated: 1980 (city)
- Amalgamated: January 1, 1998

Area
  - Land: 11.68 km^{2} (4.51 sq mi)

Population (2001)
  - Total: 16,770
  - Density: 1,435.8/km^{2} (3,719/sq mi)
- 2001 was the last census for Trenton City
- Time zone: UTC−5 (EST)
  - Summer (DST): UTC−4 (EDT)
- Postal Code FSA: K8V
- Area code: 613
- Website: www.quintewest.ca

Trenton (2001 population 16,770) is a large community in Central Ontario in the municipality of Quinte West, Ontario, Canada. Located on the Bay of Quinte, it is the starting point for the Trent-Severn Waterway, which continues northwest to Peterborough and eventually Port Severn on Georgian Bay.

== History ==
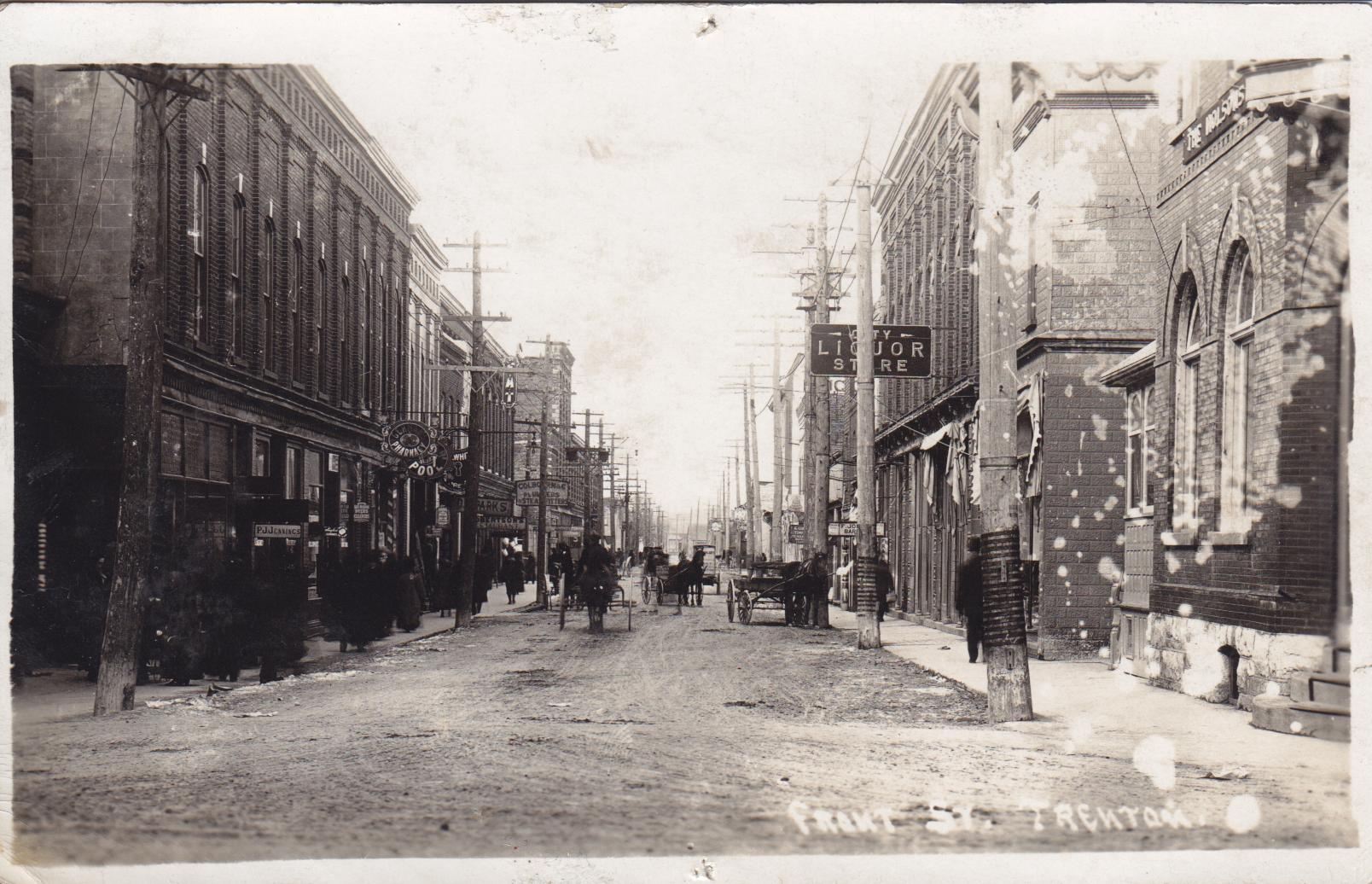
Front Street, Trenton (1914)

The Trenton area is part of the traditional area of the Mississauga and other Indigenous First Nations. The first known expedition by Europeans in the area was one by French explorer Samuel de Champlain, which followed the Trent passing through Trenton in 1615. The Trent River is known to the Mississauga as Sangichiwigewonk, or 'fast flowing.' Settlers gave it the name 'Trent', after the River Trent in England.

The area around the mouth of the Trent River was first settled by Europeans in the 1780s, after the area was ceded to the British in 1783 as part of the Crawford Purchase. United Empire Loyalists first settled in Trenton in 1792. First named Trent Port, it was renamed Trent Town and later became Trenton. Assorted settlements and town plots in the area went under a number of names until the Village of Trenton was incorporated in 1853. Trenton grew thanks to its port location and the area's lumber industry. During the First World War, the town was home to a major munitions plant owned by the British Chemical Company. This facility was built in 1915 to manufacture artillery, rifle, and small arms ammunition. Three weeks before the Armistice, an explosion levelled the plant. Remains of the old plant can still be found today.

Trenton was also an important film production centre. In 1917, a film studio was built in the town and a number of productions were filmed there. In 1923, the Trenton Film Plant was purchased by the Ontario government to house the studio and laboratory of the Ontario Motion Picture Bureau. The advent of talkies and 16mm film made the equipment at the film plant obsolete and the facility closed in 1934.

The construction of a RCAF Station Trenton, a major Royal Canadian Air Force base just east of Trenton, started in 1929 and continued through the 1930s. This provided a major economic boost to the area through the Great Depression, the Second World War and later.

Trenton Town annexed parts of Sidney Township in 1964 and parts of Murray Township in Northumberland County in 1964 and 1968.

Trenton was incorporated as a city in 1980. On January 1, 1998, Trenton was amalgamated with the Village of Frankford and the Townships of Murray and Sidney to form Quinte West. Home to nearly half the population of Quinte West, Trenton is the largest community within the municipality, and is one of Ontario's largest unincorporated settlements.

== Demographics ==
Historical census populations – Trenton, Ontario

Year	Pop.	±%
1871	1,796	—
1881	3,042	+69.4%
1891	4,363	+43.4%
1901	4,217	−3.3%
1911	3,988	−5.4%
1921	5,902	+48.0%
1931	6,276	+6.3%

Year	Pop.	±%
1941	8,323	+32.6%
1951	10,085	+21.2%
1956	11,492	+14.0%
1961	13,183	+14.7%
1966	13,746	+4.3%
1971	14,589	+6.1%
1976	15,476	+6.1%

Year	Pop.	±%
1981	15,085	−2.5%
1986	15,311	+1.5%
1991	16,908	+10.4%
1996	17,179	+1.6%
2001	16,770	−2.4%

Population counts are not adjusted for boundary changes.
Source: Statistics Canada

== Economy ==
Canadian Forces Base Trenton/8 Wing, located on the east side of the town, is an important facility for the Royal Canadian Air Force's transport and search and rescue operations, and is Trenton's main employer.

Other large employers include Trenton Cold Storage, Norampac, Kruger, Mapco, Citipack, Jobsters, Pentair Thermal Controls, Nestlé, ElectroCables, Domtech, Global Med Inc., Mckesson Canada and DECA Cables.

Tourism also plays an important role in the economy, given Trenton's location as the southern entry point for the Trent–Severn Waterway.

From 1917 to 1920, The Parker Bros. Textile Mill was a movie studio, which dubbed Trenton "Hollywood North".

== Transportation ==
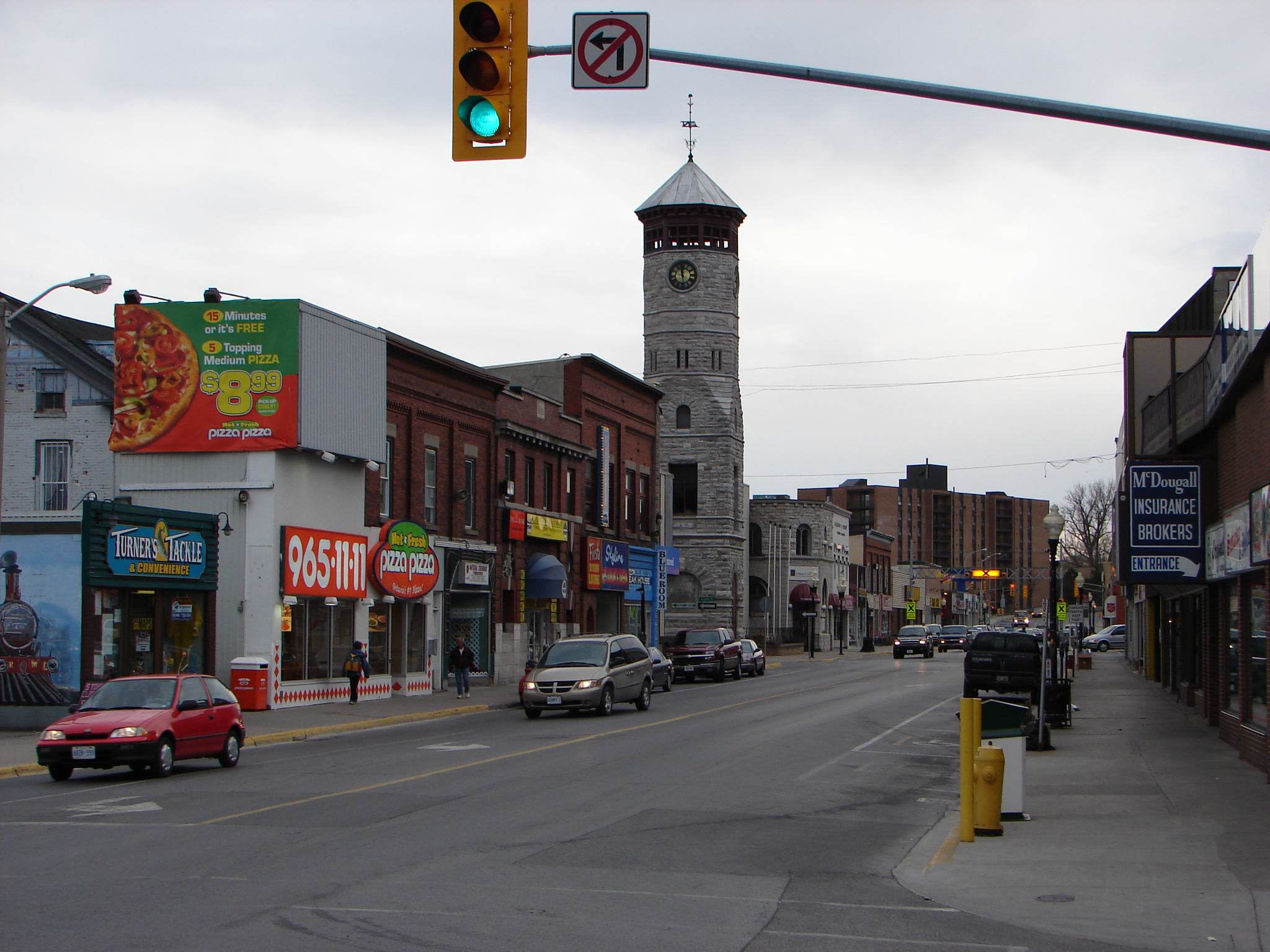
Dundas Street, the main road in Trenton

Highway 401 crosses the Trent River on the north side of the town. Hastings County Road 2 (formerly Ontario Highway 2) is the main east–west route through town, leading towards Brighton in the west and to Belleville in the east. The main north–south route is Hastings County Road 33 (formerly Ontario Highway 33), leading towards Picton to the south and Stirling to the north.

Canadian Pacific and Canadian National main railway lines (Toronto – Ottawa/Montreal) pass through the city. Via Rail offers limited passenger service to and from Toronto, Ottawa and Montreal via Kingston to Trenton Junction station.

Trenton Airport is co-located with CFB Trenton on the east side of town.

Trenton is the starting point for the Trent–Severn Waterway and two locks (Lock 1 and Lock 2) are located in the community.

Trenton also has a local public transit system, run by Quinte Access. It runs an hourly schedule Monday to Friday and limited service on Saturday (no Sunday Service, check for holidays) with Chevrolet Arboc specialized buses with ramps for wheelchairs. Several private firms also provide dispatched taxi services.

== Climate ==
Climate data for Trenton (1991–2020 normals, extremes 1921–present)
Month	Jan	Feb	Mar	Apr	May	Jun	Jul	Aug	Sep	Oct	Nov	Dec	Year
Record high humidex	17.4	15.8	27.9	32.5	42.3	43.5	47.1	49.3	43.5	35.0	26.4	18.5	49.3
Record high °C (°F)	15.1 (59.2)	16.3 (61.3)	25.4 (77.7)	29.6 (85.3)	33.4 (92.1)	35.6 (96.1)	38.9 (102.0)	36.1 (97.0)	35.0 (95.0)	29.5 (85.1)	22.8 (73.0)	16.2 (61.2)	38.9 (102.0)
Mean daily maximum °C (°F)	−1.6 (29.1)	−0.7 (30.7)	4.4 (39.9)	11.6 (52.9)	18.9 (66.0)	23.9 (75.0)	26.5 (79.7)	25.6 (78.1)	21.6 (70.9)	14.2 (57.6)	7.4 (45.3)	1.4 (34.5)	12.8 (55.0)
Daily mean °C (°F)	−6.4 (20.5)	−5.7 (21.7)	−0.6 (30.9)	6.3 (43.3)	13.1 (55.6)	18.3 (64.9)	21.0 (69.8)	20.0 (68.0)	15.8 (60.4)	9.2 (48.6)	3.0 (37.4)	−2.8 (27.0)	7.6 (45.7)
Mean daily minimum °C (°F)	−11.2 (11.8)	−10.6 (12.9)	−5.5 (22.1)	0.9 (33.6)	7.3 (45.1)	12.7 (54.9)	15.4 (59.7)	14.4 (57.9)	10.1 (50.2)	4.2 (39.6)	−1.5 (29.3)	−6.9 (19.6)	2.4 (36.3)
Record low °C (°F)	−35.1 (−31.2)	−39.4 (−38.9)	−28.9 (−20.0)	−17.2 (1.0)	−6.1 (21.0)	1.1 (34.0)	5.6 (42.1)	3.3 (37.9)	−4.6 (23.7)	−10 (14)	−19.4 (−2.9)	−33.3 (−27.9)	−39.4 (−38.9)
Record low wind chill	−44.9	−44.1	−35.0	−21.9	−8.5	0.0	0.0	0.0	−6.1	−12.2	−28.9	−42.4	−44.9
Average precipitation mm (inches)	78.4 (3.09)	59.9 (2.36)	64.4 (2.54)	84.3 (3.32)	81.4 (3.20)	82.9 (3.26)	75.1 (2.96)	70.1 (2.76)	91.6 (3.61)	91.2 (3.59)	84.2 (3.31)	76.9 (3.03)	940.5 (37.03)
Average rainfall mm (inches)	42.9 (1.69)	26.3 (1.04)	42.8 (1.69)	78.3 (3.08)	81.4 (3.20)	82.9 (3.26)	75.1 (2.96)	70.1 (2.76)	91.6 (3.61)	90.7 (3.57)	75.5 (2.97)	49.4 (1.94)	807.1 (31.78)
Average snowfall cm (inches)	44.3 (17.4)	38.5 (15.2)	22.3 (8.8)	6.3 (2.5)	0.0 (0.0)	0.0 (0.0)	0.0 (0.0)	0.0 (0.0)	0.0 (0.0)	0.5 (0.2)	10.3 (4.1)	32.8 (12.9)	155.0 (61.0)
Average precipitation days (≥ 0.2 mm)	16.3	12.8	12.7	12.9	12.6	11.6	10.6	10.9	10.8	14.0	13.4	15.1	153.7
Average rainy days (≥ 0.2 mm)	6.4	5.1	8.3	11.9	12.6	11.6	10.6	10.9	10.8	13.9	11.1	8.5	121.6
Average snowy days (≥ 0.2 cm)	12.5	9.9	6.7	2.2	0.07	0.0	0.0	0.0	0.0	0.31	3.7	9.0	44.4
Average relative humidity (%) (at 15:00 LST)	69.1	66.3	60.3	56.5	57.1	60.2	59.6	61.3	62.8	64.7	67.9	71.1	63.1
Source: Environment Canada

== Recreation and culture ==
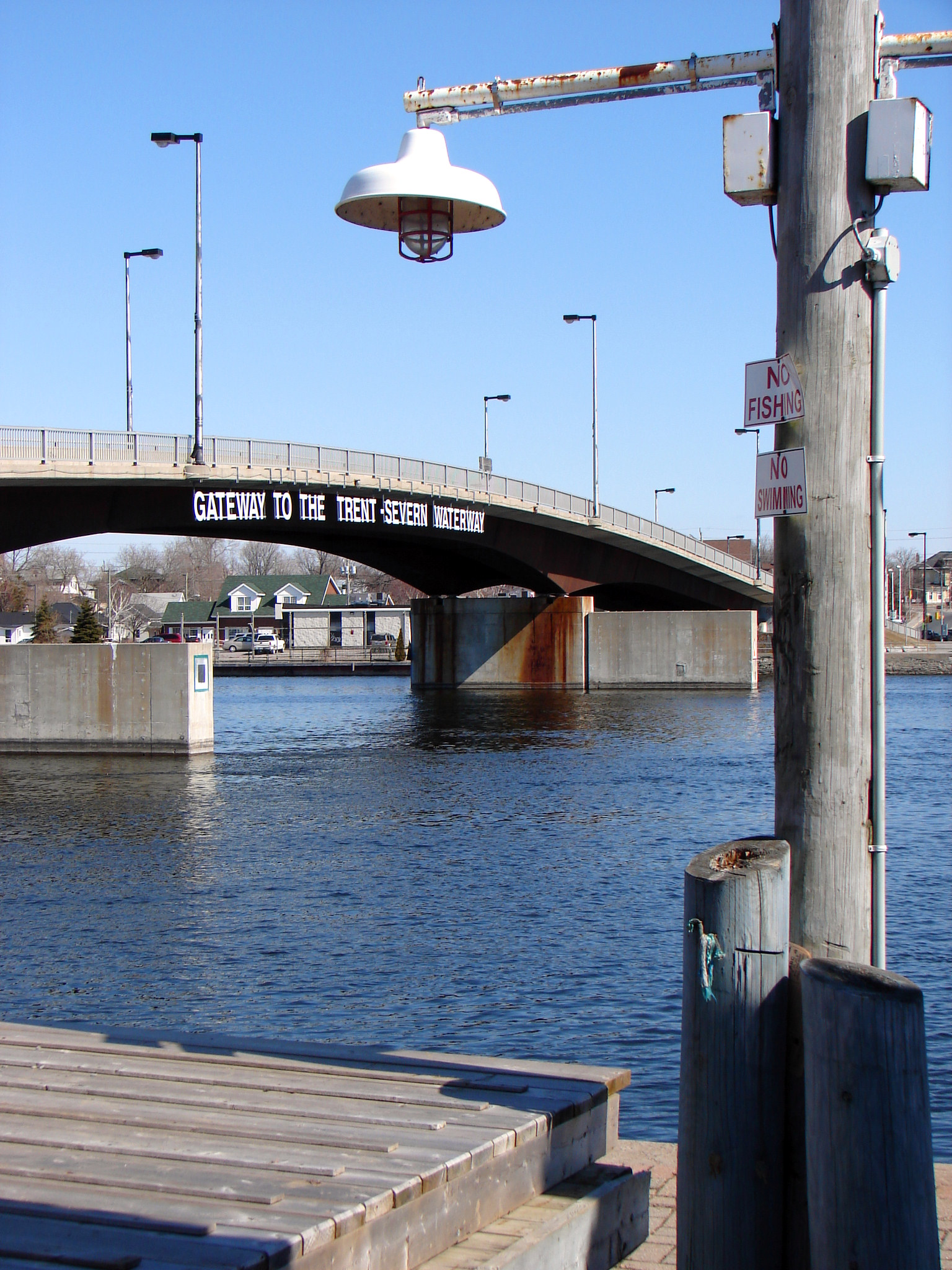
Trenton is the gateway to the Trent-Severn Waterway.

Trenton is located on the Lake Ontario Waterfront Trail. Surrounding Trenton, there are numerous conservation areas, a YMCA, campsites, picnic grounds, and marinas. The area has nine golf courses, three ice hockey rinks, numerous soccer fields, bowling, many kilometres of walking trails, a dog park, curling rinks and baseball diamonds, amongst many other recreational activities. Trenton also serves as a gateway to Prince Edward County, south of the Bay of Quinte. This area is becoming increasingly well known for its vineyards, camping, beaches and boating.

The city is home to the Trenton Golden Hawks a junior hockey team that plays in the OJHL.

Trenton is the site of the National Air Force Museum of Canada. It features an original RAF Halifax Bomber, the 75th RCAF time capsule, a Lockheed CC-130E Hercules, and many other aircraft and exhibits. The museum is presently restoring an Avro Lancaster bomber.

Every summer CFB Trenton is home to over one thousand Royal Canadian Air Cadets who attend two-week Familiarization Courses, three-week Introductory Specialty Courses, and six-week Advanced Specialty Courses, and has special staff positions for more senior cadets. These summer courses introduce the cadets to a military learning environment. Most camps here also go on trips to the airport, the Air Museum, and other relevant places.

Trenton is a hot spot for sport fishing. Popular freshwater fish in the Bay of Quinte and the Trent River include walleye (pickerel), bass, pike, perch, and mudcat. During particular times of the year, salmon and rainbow trout can be caught in the Trent River and in cold-water streams in the area. Each year in May, the Kiwanis Club of Trenton holds the Annual Live Release Fishing Derby, attracting thousands of sport fishermen from around North America with major prizes for tagged fish and heaviest weighed walleye and Northern pike.

In 1990, Canadian poet Al Purdy (who received the Order of Canada and the Governor General's award) published his only novel, A Splinter In The Heart. It takes place entirely in Trenton and provides a historical look at the town. It mentions many of the landmarks in the city (Mount Pelion, The Bridges, Trent River, etc.) and documents the period of the town directly before and after the huge munitions plant explosion of 1918. Purdy also wrote a poem titled "At the Quinte Hotel" about the strip club in Trenton called The Sherwood Forest Inn.

Another thing that Trenton is known for is its opportunities for swimming, fishing and boating. In addition it is known for being the capital of walleye fishing.

== Education ==
The public school system is served by the Hastings & Prince Edward District School Board, and the separate school system is served by the Algonquin and Lakeshore Catholic District School Board as well as one school in the area that is part of the neighbouring school board, the Kawartha Pine Ridge District School Board.

There are also the French public school boards: Conseil des écoles publiques de l'Est de l'Ontario and Conseil des écoles catholiques du Centre-Est.

== Notable people ==
- John Allore (1964–2023), actor and writer
- Roy Bonisteel (1930–2013), journalist, former host of the CBC Television program Man Alive
- Mel Bridgman (born 1955), former National Hockey League player
- William Bleasdell Cameron (1862–1951), survivor of the Frog Lake Massacre, author, journalist.
- Graydon Carter, editor-in-chief, Vanity Fair
- Henry Comstock (1820–1870), after whom Nevada's Comstock Lode was named
- George Ferguson (1952–2019), former professional hockey player for the Toronto Maple Leafs
- John Garrett (1951–2026), former National Hockey League goalie and hockey announcer
- Howard Graham (1898–1986), commander of the Canadian Army (1955–1958)
- Steve Graves (born 1964), former National Hockey League hockey player
- Jayna Hefford (born 1977), member of Canada's gold medal women's hockey team at the 2014 Sochi Winter Olympics
- Peter Knegt (born 1984), writer, producer, and filmmaker
- Elizabeth Manley (born 1965), 1988 Olympic figure skating silver medalist
- Brenda Martin, Canadian woman imprisoned in Mexico
- Al Purdy (1918–2000), C.M., O.Ont., one of Canada's most renowned writers
- Adam Sioui (born 1982), 2008 Olympic swimmer
- Steve Smith (born 1963), former National Hockey League player
- Marc Tessier-Lavigne (born 1959), neuroscientist, 11th and current president of Stanford University
- Tom Tilley, retired ice hockey defenceman
- Peter Wintonick (1953–2013), documentary filmmaker

== Notes ==
- Rayburn, Alan. Place Names of Ontario. Toronto: University of Toronto Press, 1997. ISBN 0-8020-7207-0.

== See also ==
- List of unincorporated communities in Ontario
