= Saskatchewan Highway 946 =

Provincial highway in Saskatchewan, Canada

Highway 946

Route information
- Maintained by Ministry of Highways and Infrastructure
- Length: 33 km (21 mi)

Major junctions
- South end: Highway 24 at Leoville
- North end: Highway 943

Location
- Country: Canada
- Province: Saskatchewan

Highway system
- Provincial highways in Saskatchewan
← Highway 945	→ Highway 950

Highway 946 is a provincial highway in the Canadian province of Saskatchewan. It runs from Highway 943 to the intersection of Highway 24 and Range Road 3113 at Leoville. It is about 33 kilometres (21 mi) long.

== See also ==
- Roads in Saskatchewan
- Transportation in Saskatchewan
