= Pelican Lake 191C =

Indian reserve in Saskatchewan, Canada

Coordinates: 53°50′40″N 107°41′38″W

- Indian reserve
- Pelican Lake Indian Reserve No. 191C
- Location in Saskatchewan
- First Nation: Pelican Lake
- Country: Canada
- Province: Saskatchewan

Area
  - Total: 3,276.1 ha (8,095 acres)

Pelican Lake 191C is an Indian reserve of the Pelican Lake First Nation in Saskatchewan. It is about 81 kilometres (50 mi) south-east of Meadow Lake.

== See also ==
- List of Indian reserves in Saskatchewan
