= Pelican Lake 191B =

Indian reserve in Saskatchewan, Canada

Coordinates: 53°37′06″N 107°41′25″W

- Indian reserve
- Pelican Lake Indian Reserve No. 191B
- Location in Saskatchewan
- First Nation: Pelican Lake
- Country: Canada
- Province: Saskatchewan

Area
  - Total: 3,390 ha (8,400 acres)

Population (2016)
  - Total: 50
  - Density: 1.5/km^{2} (3.8/sq mi)

Pelican Lake 191B is an Indian reserve of the Pelican Lake First Nation in Saskatchewan. It is about 14 kilometres (8.7 mi) west of Leoville. In the 2016 Canadian Census, it recorded a population of 50 living in 11 of its 19 total private dwellings.

== See also ==
- List of Indian reserves in Saskatchewan
