= Meadow Lakes =

Meadow Lakes may refer to:

- Meadow Lakes, Alaska
- Meadow Lakes, California

== See also ==
- Meadow Lake (disambiguation)
