= Island Lake (Saskatchewan) =

Lake in Saskatchewan, Canada

- Location in Saskatchewan Island Lake (Canada)
- Location: RM of Meadow Lake No. 588 and RM of Big River No. 555, Saskatchewan
- Coordinates: 53.9819°N 107.7276°W
- Part of: Churchill River drainage basin
- River sources: Meadow Lake Escarpment
- Basin countries: Canada
- Surface area: 386.4 ha (955 acres)
- Max. depth: 3.9 m (13 ft)
- Shore length^{1}: 15.9 km (9.9 mi)
- Surface elevation: 565 m (1,854 ft)
- Settlements: None
- ^{1} Shore length is not a well-defined measure.

Island Lake is a shallow lake in the west-central part of the Canadian province of Saskatchewan. The lake is in the Mid-boreal Upland ecozone of Canada. There are two large islands and one small island in the lake. On the south-eastern shore is a provincial campground. From the northernmost point of the lake, a creek flows out and to the east where it meets Tea Creek. Tea Creek flows north into Green Lake, which is part of the Beaver River watershed.

== Island Lake Recreation Site ==
Island Lake Recreation Site (53.9745°N 107.7381°W) is a small, rustic provincial campground. The park includes the south-eastern shore of the lake and the three islands within the lake. Access is from a 6-kilometre (3.7 mi) long gravel road that starts at the intersection of Highways 943 and 945.

== See also ==
- List of lakes of Saskatchewan
- Tourism in Saskatchewan
