= George Malcolm McLeod =

Canadian politician

George Malcolm McLeod (born January 5, 1946) is a former educator and political figure in Saskatchewan. He represented Meadow Lake from 1978 to 1991 in the Legislative Assembly of Saskatchewan as a Progressive Conservative.

He was born in Meadow Lake, Saskatchewan, the son of Stanley Malcolm McLeod and Lena Rose Code, and was educated there and at the University of Saskatchewan, where he received a BEd degree. McLeod taught school in Meadow Lake, later becoming a junior high school principal. In 1971, he married Karen Bird.

McLeod served on the town council for Meadow Lake from 1973 to 1977. He served in the provincial cabinet as Minister of Tourism and Renewable Resources, as Minister of Northern Saskatchewan, as Minister of Tourism and Small Business, as Minister of Supply and Services, as Minister of Advanced Education and Manpower and as Minister of Health. McLeod was defeated by Maynard Sonntag when he ran for reelection to the Saskatchewan assembly in 1991.

As of 2006, McLeod was living in Kimball Lake, Saskatchewan.
