= Chitek Lake 191 =

Indian reserve in Saskatchewan, Canada

Coordinates: 53°42′04″N 107°46′22″W

- Indian reserve
- Chitek Lake Indian Reserve No. 191
- Location in Saskatchewan
- First Nation: Pelican Lake
- Country: Canada
- Province: Saskatchewan

Area
  - Total: 3,522.9 ha (8,705 acres)

Population (2016)
  - Total: 821
  - Density: 23.3/km^{2} (60.4/sq mi)
- Community Well-Being Index: 46

Chitek Lake 191 is an Indian reserve of the Pelican Lake First Nation in the Canadian province of Saskatchewan. It is located on the southern shore of Chitek Lake about 68 kilometres (42 mi) south-east of Meadow Lake. In the 2016 Canadian Census, it recorded a population of 821 living in 164 of its 300 total private dwellings. In the same year, its Community Well-Being index was calculated at 46 of 100, compared to 58.4 for the average First Nations community and 77.5 for the average non-Indigenous community.

== See also ==
- List of Indian reserves in Saskatchewan
