= William Thorneycroft Lofts =

Canadian politician

William Thorneycroft Lofts (March 15, 1902 – January 27, 1978) was a Transvaal Colony-born garage owner and political figure in Saskatchewan, Canada. He represented Meadow Lake from 1948 to 1952 Legislative Assembly of Saskatchewan as a Liberal.

He was born in Johannesburg, South Africa, the son of John W. Lofts and Edith Curry. His father served with the British during the Boer War. Lofts moved to Canada with his family in 1907. In 1926, he married Lillian Younger. Lofts was a dealer for Ford and International Harvester. He served as chair of the local school board. Lofts lived in Glaslyn, Saskatchewan.
