= Bapaume, Saskatchewan =

Bapaume
- Unincorporated community
- Location within Saskatchewan
- Coordinates: 53.230°N 107.402°W
- Country: Canada
- Province: Saskatchewan
- Region: Northern Saskatchewan
- Census division: 4
- Rural Municipality: Spiritwood
- Established: 1920s

Government
  - Reeve: Grant Cadieu
  - Administrator: Gloria Teer
  - Governing body: Spiritwood No. 496
- Time zone: CST
- Postal code: S0J 2M0
- Area code: 306
- Highways: Highway 3 Highway 696
- Railways: Abandoned

Bapaume is an unincorporated community in Spiritwood Rural Municipality No. 496, Saskatchewan, Canada.

== See also ==
- List of communities in Saskatchewan
