= St. Leo, Minnesota =

City in Minnesota, United States

- City
- Nickname: Swamp Town
- Location of St. Leo within Yellow Medicine County, Minnesota
- Coordinates: 44°43′02″N 96°03′09″W
- Country: United States
- State: Minnesota
- County: Yellow Medicine
- Incorporated: June 6, 1940

Government
  - Mayor: David (Bubba) Gorecki

Area
  - Total: 0.253 sq mi (0.655 km^{2})
  - Land: 0.253 sq mi (0.655 km^{2})
  - Water: 0 sq mi (0.000 km^{2})
- Elevation: 1,119 ft (341 m)

Population (2020)
  - Total: 93
  - Estimate (2022): 93
  - Density: 367.8/sq mi (142.01/km^{2})
- Time zone: UTC–6 (Central (CST))
  - Summer (DST): UTC–5 (CDT)
- ZIP Code: 56264
- Area code: 507
- FIPS code: 27-57202
- GNIS feature ID: 2396499
- Sales tax: 6.875%

St. Leo or Saint Leo is a city in Yellow Medicine County, Minnesota, United States. The population was 93 at the 2020 census.

== History ==
A post office called Saint Leo was established in 1880, and remained in operation until 1991. The city was named for Pope Leo I (d. 461).

== Geography ==
According to the United States Census Bureau, the city has a total area of 0.253 square miles (0.66 km^{2}), all land.

County Roads 3 and 11 are the main routes in the community.

== Demographics ==
Historical population
Census	Pop.	Note	%±
1950	128		—
1960	129		0.8%
1970	153		18.6%
1980	147		−3.9%
1990	111		−24.5%
2000	106		−4.5%
2010	100		−5.7%
2020	93		−7.0%
2022 (est.)	93		0.0%
U.S. Decennial Census; 2020 Census

=== 2010 census ===
As of the 2010 census, there were 100 people, 51 households, and 26 families living in the city. The population density was 384.6 inhabitants per square mile (148.5/km^{2}). There were 58 housing units at an average density of 223.1 per square mile (86.1/km^{2}). The racial makeup of the city was 98.0% White and 2.0% from two or more races. Hispanic or Latino of any race were 5.0% of the population.

There were 51 households, of which 19.6% had children under the age of 18 living with them, 41.2% were married couples living together, 3.9% had a female householder with no husband present, 5.9% had a male householder with no wife present, and 49.0% were non-families. 43.1% of all households were made up of individuals, and 17.7% had someone living alone who was 65 years of age or older. The average household size was 1.96 and the average family size was 2.65.

The median age in the city was 49.5 years. 17% of residents were under the age of 18; 9% were between the ages of 18 and 24; 16% were from 25 to 44; 25% were from 45 to 64; and 33% were 65 years of age or older. The gender makeup of the city was 58.0% male and 42.0% female.

=== 2000 census ===
As of the 2000 census, there were 106 people, 54 households, and 30 families living in the city. The population density was 404.0 inhabitants per square mile (156.0/km^{2}). There were 57 housing units at an average density of 217.2 per square mile (83.9/km^{2}). The racial makeup of the city was 98.11% White and 1.89% Native American.

There were 54 households, out of which 13.0% had children under the age of 18 living with them, 51.9% were married couples living together, 3.7% had a female householder with no husband present, and 42.6% were non-families. 40.7% of all households were made up of individuals, and 18.5% had someone living alone who was 65 years of age or older. The average household size was 1.96 and the average family size was 2.65.

In the city, the population was spread out, with 12.3% under the age of 18, 6.6% from 18 to 24, 24.5% from 25 to 44, 19.8% from 45 to 64, and 36.8% who were 65 years of age or older. The median age was 51 years. For every 100 females, there were 92.7 males. For every 100 females age 18 and over, there were 97.9 males.

The median income for a household in the city was $23,125, and the median income for a family was $40,000. Males had a median income of $19,375 versus $14,375 for females. The per capita income for the city was $15,275. There were 7.1% of families and 11.4% of the population living below the poverty line, including 11.8% of under eighteens and 5.3% of those over 64.
