= Maynard Sonntag =

Canadian politician

The Honourable Maynard Sonntag ECS

Member of the Saskatchewan Legislative Assembly for Meadow Lake
- In office October 21, 1991 – November 19, 2007
- Preceded by: George McLeod
- Succeeded by: Jeremy Harrison

Personal details
- Born: January 31, 1956 (age 70) Goodsoil, Saskatchewan, Canada
- Party: Saskatchewan New Democratic Party

Maynard Sonntag (born January 31, 1956) is a Canadian politician and a former Saskatchewan cabinet minister.

He was born, raised and educated in Goodsoil, Saskatchewan. Prior to being elected, Sonntag was a manager in the Credit Union system from 1980 to 1991.

Sonntag was first elected to the Saskatchewan legislature as the member for Meadow Lake in 1991 and was re-elected in 1995, 1999 and 2003.

Sonntag was first appointed to cabinet in June 1997 and held various portfolios between then and 2007, including: Property Management and Saskatchewan Liquor and Gaming Authority, Post-Secondary Education and Skills Training, Highways and Transportation, Energy and Mines, First Nations and Métis Relations, Industry and Resources, and Crown Investments Corporation.

Sonntag was a candidate in the 2001 Saskatchewan New Democratic Party leadership election, which occurred after Roy Romanow announced his intention to step down as Premier and leader of the Saskatchewan NDP. Sonntag placed fourth in a crowded field of seven candidates; and Lorne Calvert was subsequently elected as leader.

Sonntag was initially declared elected in the 2007 election, narrowly beating former federal Member of Parliament Jeremy Harrison in Meadow Lake, but was subsequently declared defeated after a count error was noted the following day. The count of absentee ballots on November 19 confirmed Harrison's victory - by only 36 votes. This result was later confirmed by a judicial recount.

== Electoral record ==
2007 Saskatchewan general election: Meadow Lake
Party	Candidate	Votes	%	±%
Saskatchewan	Jeremy Harrison	3,507	48.86	+4.59
New Democratic	Maynard Sonntag	3,471	48.35	-1.92
Liberal	Don Coupland	200	2.79	-2.67
Total		7,178	100.00	
Saskatchewan gain from New Democratic		Swing		-

2003 Saskatchewan general election: Meadow Lake
Party	Candidate	Votes	%	±%
New Democratic	Maynard Sonntag	3,472	50.27	+3.54
Saskatchewan	Ron Dosdall	3,058	44.27	+2.85
Liberal	Don Coupland	377	5.46	-6.39
Total		6,907	100.00	

1999 Saskatchewan general election: Meadow Lake
Party	Candidate	Votes	%	±%
New Democratic	Maynard Sonntag	2,846	46.73	-1.47
Saskatchewan	Bob Young	2,523	41.42	*
Liberal	Don Coupland	722	11.85	-24.39
Total		6,091	100.00	

1995 Saskatchewan general election: Meadow Lake
Party	Candidate	Votes	%	±%
New Democratic	Maynard Sonntag	2,910	48.20	-3.09
Liberal	Dennis Barnett	2,188	36.24	+29.80
Progressive Conservative	Paul S. Pospisil	939	15.56	-26.71
Total		6,037	100.00	

1991 Saskatchewan general election: Meadow Lake
Party	Candidate	Votes	%	±%
New Democratic	Maynard Sonntag	3,719	51.29	+16.33
Progressive Conservative	George McLeod	3,065	42.27	-17.15
Liberal	J. Burton Dougan	467	6.44	+0.82
Total		7,251	100.00	
