= Meadow River (Saskatchewan) =

River in Saskatchewan, Canada

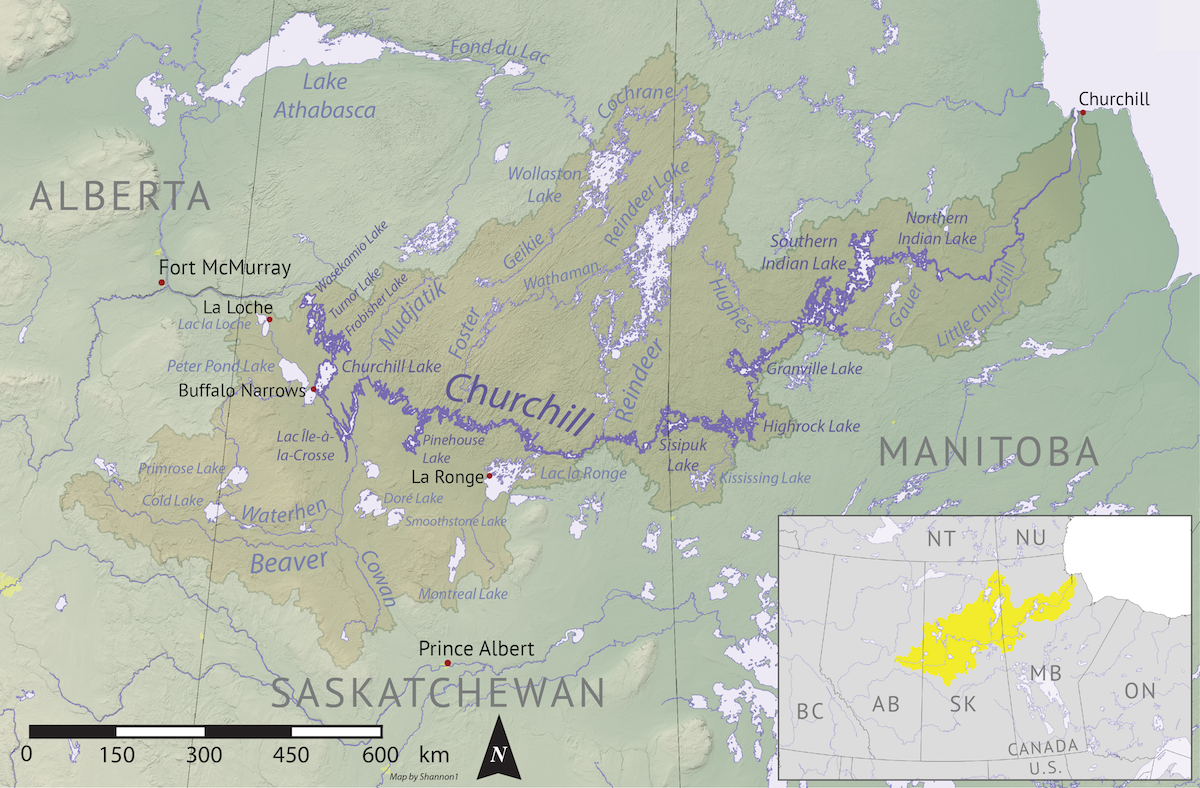
- Churchill River drainage basin

- Location of the mouth in Saskatchewan Meadow River (Saskatchewan) (Canada)

Location
- Country: Canada
- Provinces: Saskatchewan

Physical characteristics
- Source: Meadow Lake
  - location: RM of Meadow Lake No. 588
  - coordinates: 54.1269°N 108.4011°W
- Mouth: Beaver River
  - location: RM of Meadow Lake No. 588
  - coordinates: 54.3013°N 108.1886°W

Basin features
- River system: Churchill River drainage basin
- Tributaries
  - left: Morin Creek

Meadow River is a river in the Canadian province of Saskatchewan. The river's source is Meadow Lake, which is the lake adjacent to the city of Meadow Lake. The river and its drainage basin are in the transition zone between the boreal forest and prairies ecozones of Canada. Meadow River's mouth is at Beaver River, which flows northward into Lac Île-à-la-Crosse, a lake along the course of the Churchill River, which is a major river in the Hudson Bay drainage basin.

The first European to explore the river was a Hudson's Bay employee named Peter Fidler. In 1799 he had come down the Beaver River and travelled up Meadow River to Meadow Lake while mapping and exploring the region. Near the lake's shore where the river flows out, near the present day city of Meadow Lake, he built a log fort that he named Bolsover House, after his home town of Bolsover, England. The fort lasted one season before being abandoned and relocated to nearby Green Lake House.

== Description ==
Meadow River begins at the north-west corner of Meadow Lake, on the eastern side of the city of Meadow Lake. From there, it heads north past Highway 55 in a northward direction through Flying Dust First Nation. About 4.5 kilometres (2.8 mi) north of the Indian reserve, the river turns north-east and crosses Highway 903 en route to Beaver River. Meadow River meets Beaver River on the eastern side of Island Hill.

The majority of the drainage basin of Meadow River flows first north into Meadow Lake from the Meadow Lake Escarpment before flowing into Meadow River. Some of the lake's tributaries include Nolin Creek, Chitek River, Lavigne River, and Alcott Creek. Meadow Lake itself is an oval shaped, shallow lake (just over 2 m (6 ft 7 in) deep) that is the remnants of Glacial Meadow Lake, which was a glacial lake that covered the region near the end of the last ice age over 10,000 years ago.

== Fish species ==
Commonly found fish species in Meadow River include walleye and northern pike.

== See also ==
- List of rivers of Saskatchewan
- Hudson Bay drainage basin
- Geography of Saskatchewan
- North American fur trade
