= Chitek Lake (Saskatchewan) =

Lake in Saskatchewan, Canada

- Location in Saskatchewan Chitek Lake (Canada)
- Location: RM of Big River No. 555, Saskatchewan
- Coordinates: 53.7927°N 107.8487°W
- Part of: Churchill River drainage basin
- River sources: Meadow Lake Escarpment
- Primary outflows: Chitek River
- Basin countries: Canada
- Surface area: 3,328.2 ha (8,224 acres)
- Max. depth: 23.8 m (78 ft)
- Shore length^{1}: 72.53 km (45.07 mi)
- Surface elevation: 565 m (1,854 ft)
- Islands: Billings Island
- ^{1} Shore length is not a well-defined measure.

Chitek Lake is lake in the Canadian province of Saskatchewan. It is in the Mid-boreal Upland ecozone in the west-central part of Saskatchewan. Most of the lake is the RM of Big River No. 555 and only the very southernmost point is in the RM of Spiritwood No. 496. Along the lake's shores, there is the Chitek Lake Indian reserve, a community, provincial recreation area, resorts, and outfitters. The outflow is the Chitek River, which flows out from the northern end of the lake. Access is from Highway 24.

== Description ==
Chitek Lake is on the Meadow Lake Escarpment and set in a forest of mixed coniferous and deciduous tree that include trembling aspen, balsam poplar, white and black spruce, and balsam fir. It is surrounded by rolling hills and muskeg and there are 15 other lakes within about 50 kilometres (31 mi). The lake's outflow, Chitek River, flows northward from the northern end of the lake and is a major inflow for Meadow Lake. Meadow Lake's outflow is the Meadow River, which is a tributary of the Beaver River.

Chitek Lake and the surrounding boreal forest is popular for outdoor recreational activities such as hunting, camping, and fishing. As such, there are campgrounds, lodges, and outfitters around the lake to accommodate. At Chitek Lake's north-eastern corner is the resort village of Chitek Lake. Within the village is Little Pine Lodge resort and an outfitters, Northern Saskatchewan Wilderness Hunts Inc. Just south of the village, on the lake's eastern shore, is Chamakese Resort. On the west side of the lake, a short distance inland, is Northern Whitetail Outfitters.

== Chitek Lake Recreation Site ==
Chitek Lake Recreation Site (53.7532°N 107.7562°W) is a leased provincial recreation site at the northern end of the lake, adjacent to and north-west of the community of Chitek Lake. The recreation site has a campground, lake access for fishing and boating, a beach for swimming, and a picnic area. The recreation site also covers the southern half of Little Pelican Lake, the southern tip of Eyapawutik Lake, and Billings Island.

== Fish species ==
Fish commonly found in the lake include northern pike and walleye.

== See also ==
- List of lakes of Saskatchewan
- Tourism in Saskatchewan
