= Meadow Lake Airport =

Meadow Lake Airport may refer to:

- Meadow Lake Airport (Colorado) near Colorado Springs, Colorado, United States
- Meadow Lake Airport (Saskatchewan) near Meadow Lake, Saskatchewan, Canada
