= Gordon James McNeill =

Saskatchewan politician

Gordon James McNeill (August 17, 1922 – July 14, 1999) was a Member of the Legislative Assembly of Saskatchewan from 1975 until 1978, representing the constituency of Meadow Lake for the New Democratic Party.

== Biography ==
McNeill was born in Bateman and was raised in Shamrock and later married Henrietta Elizabeth (Nickie) Smith. He died in 1999.
