= Meadow Lake (Saskatchewan) =

Lake in Saskatchewan, Canada

- Location in Saskatchewan Meadow Lake (Canada)
- Location: RM of Meadow Lake No. 588, Saskatchewan
- Coordinates: 54.1168°N 108.334°W
- Part of: Churchill River drainage basin
- Primary inflows: Chitek River; Nolin Creek
- River sources: Meadow Lake Escarpment
- Primary outflows: Meadow River
- Basin countries: Canada
- Max. length: 9.6 km (6.0 mi)
- Max. width: 4.8 km (3.0 mi)
- Max. depth: 2.2 m (7 ft 3 in)
- Shore length^{1}: 28 km (17 mi)
- Surface elevation: 482 m (1,581 ft)
- Settlements: Meadow Lake
- ^{1} Shore length is not a well-defined measure.

Meadow Lake is a small, shallow, oval-shaped lake that is the source of Meadow River. It is also the namesake of Meadow Lake Provincial Park, despite not being within the park's boundaries. The lake is in the transition zone between the boreal forest and prairies ecozones of Canada.

Meadow Lake is situated in the Rural Municipality of Meadow Lake No. 588. The city of Meadow Lake is on the western shore and Flying Dust First Nation is along the north-western shore, adjacent to the city. Highway 55 runs along the northern shore and Highway 799, the southern shore. Highway 4 is west of the lake and provides access to the city.

== History ==
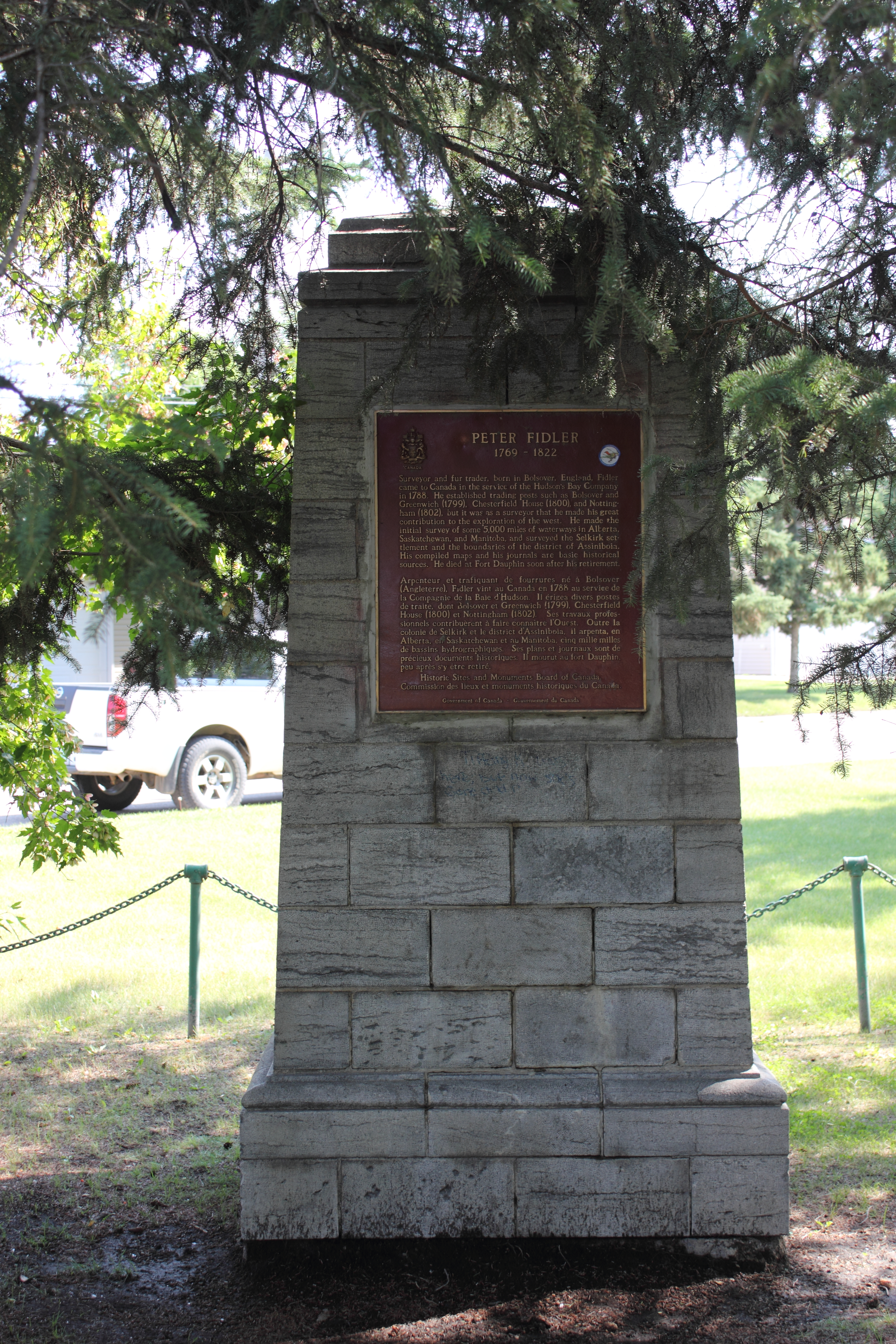
Peter Fidler monument, Elk's Park, Meadow Lake

Peter Fidler was the first European to discover the lake. He was a Hudson's Bay employee who was exploring and mapping the region in 1799 and, upon the lake's discovery, he named it Lac des Prairies and built a 12-foot by 12-foot log fort. He named the fort Bolsover House, after his home town of Bolsover in England. It lasted only one season before being abandoned and relocated to Green Lake House. While the exact location of the trading post is unknown, it is believed to be near the spot where Meadow River flows out of the lake. A monument was erected in Meadow Lake's Elk's Park in 1955 by the Government of Canada to pay homage Peter Fidler.

== Description ==
Meadow Lake is the remnants of a once vast glacial lake called Glacial Meadow Lake that existed near the end of the last ice age over 10,000 years ago.

Meadow River, located at the north-west corner of the lake, is Meadow Lake's outflow. Meadow River flows generally north-east until it meets Beaver River. Beaver River flows into Lac Île-à-la-Crosse, which is a lake along the course of the Churchill River—a major tributary of the Hudson Bay drainage basin.

Meadow Lake is situated north of the Meadow Lake Escarpment. A large part of the northern slope of the escarpment is within the lake's catchment and was also the southern limit of Glacial Meadow Lake.

The following rivers and creeks flow into Meadow Lake:

- Nolin Creek
- Chitek River, which starts at Chitek Lake
  - Lavigne River
  - Alcott Creek
    - Sulby Creek
    - Myo Creek

== Fish species ==
Fish species commonly found in Meadow Lake include northern pike, walleye, yellow perch, cisco, white sucker, and lake whitefish.

== See also ==
- List of lakes of Saskatchewan
- Geography of Saskatchewan
- North American fur trade
