= Pelican Lake First Nation =

Native American tribal organization

- Headquarters: P.O. Box 399; Pelican Lake First Nation, SK S0J 1N0

Pelican Lake First Nation (Cree: ᒐᐦᒐᐦᑭᐤ ᓵᑲᐦᐃᑲᓂᕽ cahcahkiw-sâkahikanihk, meaning: at the Pelican Lake) is a member of the Federation of Saskatchewan First Nations, the body that represents 74 First Nations in Saskatchewan.

Pelican Lake First Nation is located on the shore of Chitek Lake, approximately 170 miles northwest of Saskatoon 115 miles northeast of North Battleford and 120 miles west of Prince Albert.

Together with Witchekan Lake First Nation and Big River First Nation, Pelican Lake is affiliated with the Agency Chiefs Tribal Council.

== Demographics ==
At date of first survey there was total of 112 band members. The population according to the 2006 census was 825. However, the registered population was 1,555 as of December 2013.

== Government ==
- Councilor Greg Bill
- Councilor Jimmy Bill
- Councilor Lee Bill
- Councilor Donny Rabbitskin
- Councilor Harriet Thomas
- Councilor Twyla Whitehead
- Chief Romeo Thomas (chief since April 2025)

== History ==
At date of first survey, the Pelican Lake First Nation received 8,630.4 acres for reserve land. Through the Treaty Land Entitlement (TLE) Process, Pelican Lake First Nation was awarded and additional 36,714.66 acres in 1979. Further completed, in 1992 by the Office of the Treaty Commissioner, determined that Pelican Lake First Nation was legally entitled to a minimum of 36,714 acres under Treaty No. Six. Pelican Lake First Nation voted in favor of ratifying the TLE Agreement in September 1995, which provided the Pelican Lake First Nation with a total of 30,753.06 additional equity acres to Reserve status. The TLE Process will allow Pelican Lake First Nation to increase its total Reserve land to 45,345 acres.

== Reserves ==
Pelican Lake First Nation has reserved for itself five reserves:

- Chitek Lake 191
- Pelican Lake 191A
- Pelican Lake 191B
- Pelican Lake 191C
- Pelican Lake 191D
