= Leoville, Saskatchewan =

Village in Saskatchewan, Canada

Leoville
- Village
- Village of Leoville
- Location of Leoville Leoville (Canada)
- Coordinates: 53°37′55″N 107°33′04″W
- Country: Canada
- Province: Saskatchewan
- Region: Central
- Census division: 16
- Rural municipality: Spiritwood No. 496
- Post office founded: 1930

Government
  - Type: Municipal
  - Governing body: Leoville Village Council
  - Mayor: Ron Craswell
  - Administrator: Mona Chalifour

Area
  - Total: 1.11 km^{2} (0.43 sq mi)

Population (2016)
  - Total: 375
  - Density: 339.2/km^{2} (879/sq mi)
- Time zone: UTC-6 (CST)
- Postal code: S0J 1N0
- Area code: 306
- Highways: Highway 24; Highway 946

Leoville (2016 population: 375) is a village in the Canadian province of Saskatchewan within the Rural Municipality of Spiritwood No. 496 and Census Division No. 16. The village is located along Highway 24 (named the worst road in Saskatchewan by the CAA in 2014). Highway 946 begins in the village and proceeds north. Leoville is home to the administrative centre of the Pelican Lake First Nation band government.

== History ==
Leoville incorporated as a village on June 26, 1944.

== Demographics ==
Population history (1981–2016)
Year	Pop.	±%
1981	393	—
1986	394	+0.3%
1991	370	−6.1%
1996	359	−3.0%
2001	343	−4.5%
2006	341	−0.6%
2011	366	+7.3%
2016	375	+2.5%
Source: Statistics Canada via Saskatchewan Bureau of Statistics

In the 2021 Census of Population conducted by Statistics Canada, Leoville had a population of 364 living in 151 of its 163 total private dwellings, a change of −2.9% from its 2016 population of 375. With a land area of 1.14 km^{2} (0.44 sq mi), it had a population density of 319.3/km^{2} (827.0/sq mi) in 2021.

In the 2016 Census of Population, the Village of Leoville recorded a population of 375 living in 146 of its 162 total private dwellings, a 2.4% change from its 2011 population of 366. With a land area of 1.11 km^{2} (0.43 sq mi), it had a population density of 337.8/km^{2} (875.0/sq mi) in 2016.

== See also ==
- List of communities in Saskatchewan
- List of villages in Saskatchewan
- List of francophone communities in Saskatchewan
- Leoville Airport
