= Chitek Lake, Saskatchewan =

Community in Saskatchewan, Canada

Chitek Lake
- Resort village
- Resort Village of Chitek Lake
- Location within Saskatchewan
- Coordinates: 53.751°N 107.724°W
- Country: Canada
- Province: Saskatchewan
- Census division: 16
- Rural municipality: RM of Big River No. 555
- Incorporated: July 1, 1978

Government
  - Mayor: Sandra Svoboda
  - Governing body: Resort Village Council
  - Administrator: Tara Westmacott
  - Clerk: Kim Currey
  - Council Members: Robert Fraser, Leona Paulton, John Vandale, Jack Mochoruk

Area (2016)
  - Land: 2.54 km^{2} (0.98 sq mi)

Population (2016)
  - Total: 138
  - Density: 54.3/km^{2} (141/sq mi)
- Time zone: CST
  - Summer (DST): CST
- Area codes: 306 and 639
- Waterway(s): Chitek Lake
- Website: Official website

Chitek Lake (2016 population: 138) is a resort village in the Canadian province of Saskatchewan within Census Division No. 16. It is on the shores of Chitek Lake in the Rural Municipality of Big River No. 555 approximately 230 kilometres (140 mi) northwest of Saskatoon, 115 kilometres (71 mi) northeast of North Battleford, and 120 kilometres (75 mi) west of Prince Albert. The Pelican Lake First Nation reserve borders the resort village.

== History ==
Chitek Lake incorporated as a resort village on July 1, 1978.

== Demographics ==
Population history (1981–2016)
Year	Pop.	±%
1981	170	—
1986	176	+3.5%
1991	195	+10.8%
1996	214	+9.7%
2001	174	−18.7%
2006	219	+25.9%
2011	167	−23.7%
2016	138	−17.4%
2021	300	+117.4%
Source: Statistics Canada via Saskatchewan Bureau of Statistics

In the 2021 Census of Population conducted by Statistics Canada, Chitek Lake had a population of 300 living in 130 of its 318 total private dwellings, a change of 117.4% from its 2016 population of 138. With a land area of 2.57 km^{2} (0.99 sq mi), it had a population density of 116.7/km^{2} (302.3/sq mi) in 2021.

In the 2016 Census of Population conducted by Statistics Canada, the Resort Village of Chitek Lake recorded a population of 138 living in 69 of its 291 total private dwellings, a −17.4% change from its 2011 population of 167. With a land area of 2.54 km^{2} (0.98 sq mi), it had a population density of 54.3/km^{2} (140.7/sq mi) in 2016.

== Government ==
The Resort Village of Chitek Lake is governed by an elected municipal council and an appointed administrator that meets on the third Thursday of every month. The mayor is Sandra Svoboda and its administrator is Tara Westmacott.

== See also ==
- List of communities in Saskatchewan
- List of francophone communities in Saskatchewan
- List of municipalities in Saskatchewan
- List of resort villages in Saskatchewan
- List of villages in Saskatchewan
- List of summer villages in Alberta
