= Meadow Lake, Saskatchewan =

City in Saskatchewan, Canada

Meadow Lake Lac des Prairies
- City
- City of Meadow Lake
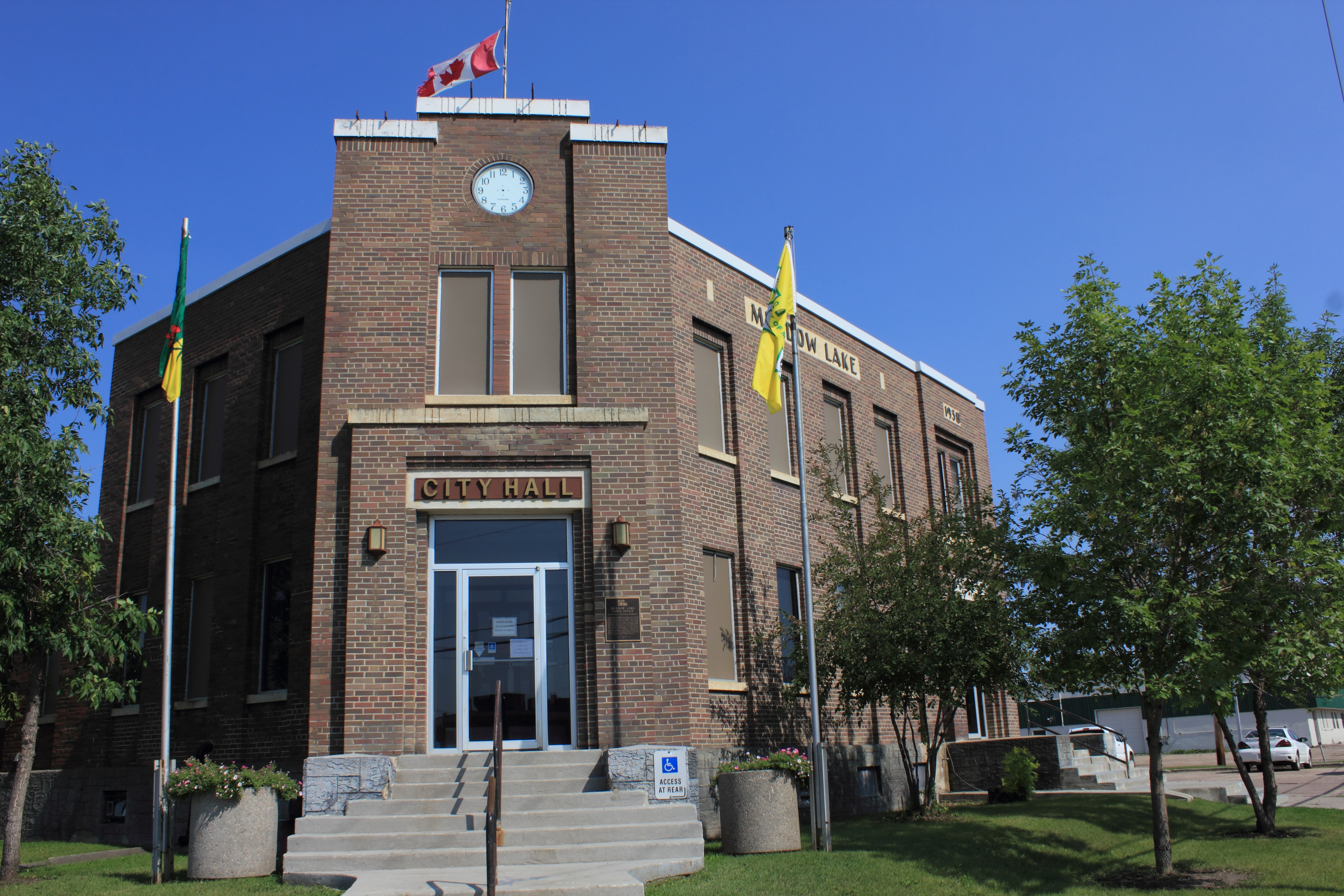
- Meadow Lake City Hall
- Motto(s): Gateway to Pure Air and Water
- Location of Meadow Lake in Saskatchewan Meadow Lake (Canada)
- Coordinates: 54°07′27″N 108°26′09″W
- Country: Canada
- Province: Saskatchewan
- Incorporated Village: August 29, 1931
- Incorporated Town: February 1, 1936
- Incorporated City: November 9, 2009

Government
  - Mayor: Merlin Seymour
  - MLA Constituency of Meadow Lake: Jeremy Harrison
  - MP Battlefords—Lloydminster—Meadow Lake: Rosemarie Falk

Area
  - Land: 12.32 km^{2} (4.76 sq mi)
- Elevation 480.40: 498.30 m (1,634.8 ft)

Population (2016)
  - Total: 5,344
  - Density: 433.6/km^{2} (1,123/sq mi)
- Time zone: UTC−6 (Central Standard Time)
- Forward sortation area: S9X
- Highways: Hwy 55, Hwy 4
- Post office established: January 1, 1911
- Website: Meadow Lake

Meadow Lake is a city in the boreal forest of northwestern Saskatchewan, Canada. Its location is about 246 kilometres (153 mi) northeast of Lloydminster and 156 kilometres (97 mi) north of North Battleford. Founded as a trading post in 1799, it became a village in 1931 and a town in 1936. On November 9, 2009, it officially became Saskatchewan's 14th city.

Meadow Lake is the main business centre of northwestern Saskatchewan and serves the many towns and villages as a regional shopping centre. It is the second-largest community in Saskatchewan's Census Division No. 17, after Saskatchewan's portion of the interprovincial city of Lloydminster. The city is on the western shore of Meadow Lake and borders the Rural Municipality of Meadow Lake No. 588 and the Flying Dust First Nation No. 105 Indian reserves.

== History ==
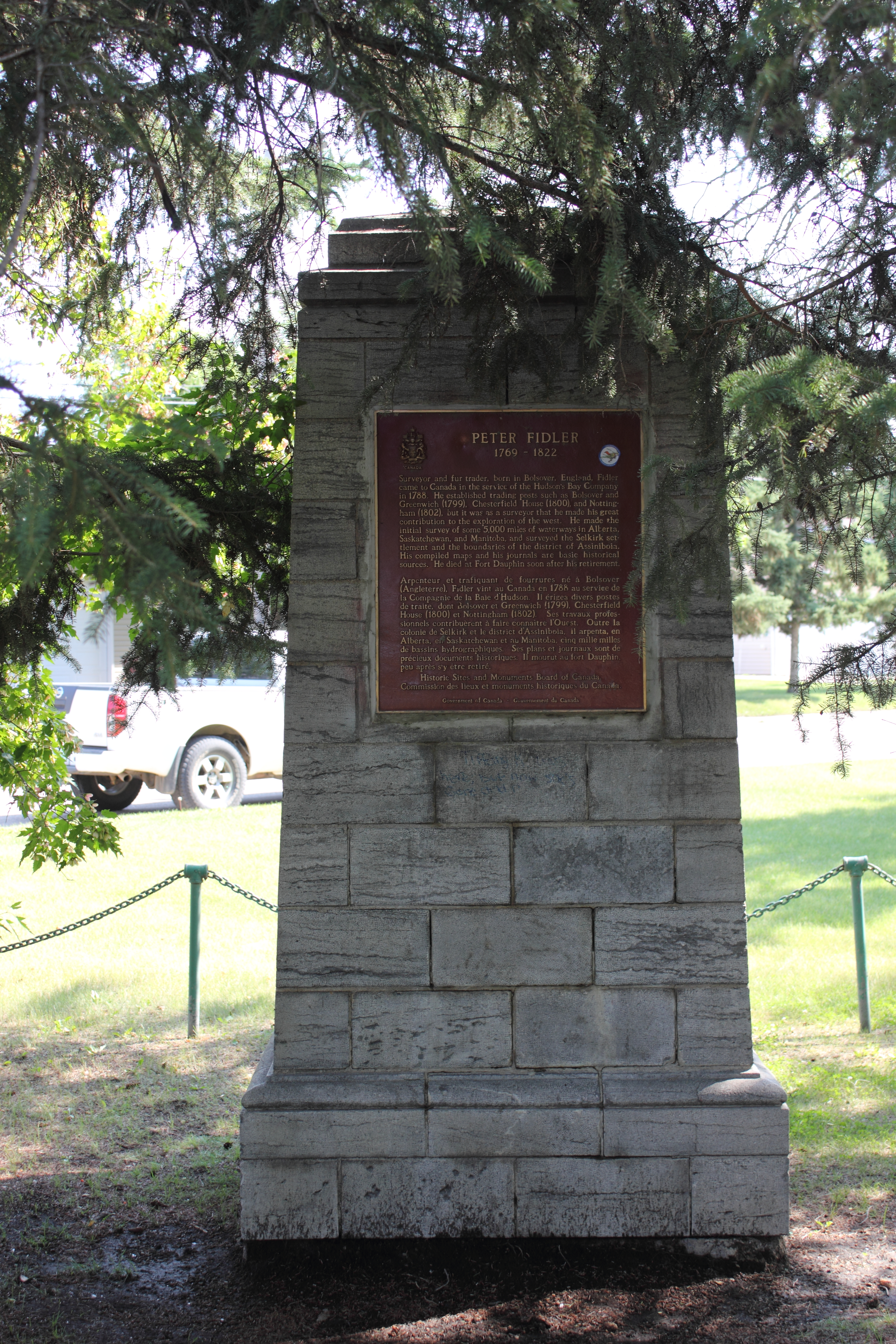
Peter Fidler Monument in Elk's Park

Peter Fidler built Bolsover House in 1799 near "Lac des Prairies", the first name given to Meadow Lake. In 1873, Métis families arrived, establishing a Hudson's Bay Company trading post, joined by other settlers in the early 1900s. The largest impetus occurred following a fire of 1919 and the exodus of some of the settlers during the Great Depression from the Dust Bowl of central and southern Saskatchewan to communities in the north.

=== Bolsover House ===
Peter Fidler of the Hudson's Bay Company was told by Indian guides that Meadow Lake was a good place for furs. On August 30, 1799, he reached the mouth of the Meadow Lake River. The stream was so narrow and crooked that he almost despaired of navigating it. When he reached the lake, he found it so shallow and swampy that he had to proceed demi-chargé. Finding no good place on the lake, he went up a river and selected a place about 1,000 yards inland to build the 12-foot by 12-foot log fort. He named it Bolsover House after his hometown in England. The post returned only 190 made beaver in the first season, so in 1801 it was closed and everything moved east to Green Lake House. The exact site of Bolsover House is unknown. There is a monument to Peter Fidler in Meadow Lake at Elk's Park.

== Demographics ==
In the 2021 Census of Population conducted by Statistics Canada, Meadow Lake had a population of 5,322 living in 1,930 of its 2,125 total private dwellings, a change of −0.4% from its 2016 population of 5,344. With a land area of 12.37 km^{2} (4.78 sq mi), it had a population density of 430.2/km^{2} (1,114.3/sq mi) in 2021.

Historical Population
Year	Pop.	±%
1955	2,216	—
1991	4,318	+94.9%
1996	4,819	+11.6%
2001	4,582	−4.9%
2006	4,771	+4.1%
2011	5,055	+6.0%
2016	5,344	+5.7%

The Meadow Lake Indian Band was established in 1889 with the signing of Treaty 6 to the north of Meadow Lake. This reserve is now named the Flying Dust First Nation.

Canada census – Meadow Lake community profile

	2021	2016	2011
Population	5,322 (-0.4% from 2016)	5,344 (5.7% from 2011)	5,045 (+5.7% from 2006)
Land area	12.37 km^{2} (4.78 sq mi)	12.32 km^{2} (4.76 sq mi)	7.95 km^{2} (3.07 sq mi)
Population density	430.2/km^{2} (1,114/sq mi)	433.6/km^{2} (1,123/sq mi)	634.2/km^{2} (1,643/sq mi)
Median age	32.8 (M: 31.8, F: 34.0)		32.7 (M: 31.1, F: 34.0)
Private dwellings	2,125 (total) 1,930 (occupied)	2,113 (total)	2,042 (total)
Median household income	$86,000

References: 2021 2016 2011

Panethnic groups in the City of Meadow Lake (2001−2021)
Panethnic group	2021		2016		2011		2006		2001	
Panethnic group	Pop.	%	Pop.	%	Pop.	%	Pop.	%	Pop.	%
Indigenous	2,550	48.99%	2,350	44.76%	2,180	44.35%	1,865	39.85%	1,540	34.22%
European (Note: Statistic includes all persons that did not make up part of a visible minority or an indigenous identity.)	2,085	40.06%	2,565	48.86%	2,545	51.78%	2,755	58.87%	2,930	65.11%
Southeast Asian (Note: Statistic includes total responses of "Filipino" and "Southeast Asian" under visible minority section on census.)	240	4.61%	160	3.05%	140	2.85%	45	0.96%	0	0%
South Asian	130	2.5%	80	1.52%	0	0%	0	0%	0	0%
African	90	1.73%	70	1.33%	0	0%	10	0.21%	10	0.22%
East Asian (Note: Statistic includes total responses of "Chinese", "Korean", and "Japanese" under visible minority section on census.)	30	0.58%	35	0.67%	35	0.71%	20	0.43%	20	0.44%
Middle Eastern (Note: Statistic includes total responses of "West Asian" and "Arab" under visible minority section on census.)	25	0.48%	10	0.19%	0	0%	0	0%	0	0%
Latin American	0	0%	0	0%	0	0%	0	0%	0	0%
Other/multiracial (Note: Statistic includes total responses of "Visible minority, n.i.e." and "Multiple visible minorities" under visible minority section on census.)	40	0.77%	0	0%	0	0%	0	0%	0	0%
Total responses	5,205	97.8%	5,250	98.24%	4,915	97.23%	4,680	98.09%	4,500	98.21%
Total population	5,322	100%	5,344	100%	5,055	100%	4,771	100%	4,582	100%
Note: Totals greater than 100% due to multiple origin responses

== Geography ==
Meadow Lake is located in the middle of an area pre-historically covered by a large glacial lake, also called Meadow Lake, formed from a receding continental glacier, of which only a fraction still exists. The lake is located on the east side of the city. The ancient lakeshore forms the Meadow Lake Escarpment, a significant terrain feature clearly visible looking south from many points in the city.

The area is a part of the Southern Boreal EcoRegion with the Northern Boreal EcoRegion to the north and the Parkland EcoRegion to the south. The neighbouring rural areas include Trembling aspen Populus tremuloides, White spruce Picea glauca, Jack Pine Pinus banksiana, Black Spruce Picea mariana and muskegs.

Specifically, Meadow Lake is situated in the Meadow Lake plain of the Boreal transition ecoregion in the Boreal Plain ecozone.

=== Climate ===
Meadow Lake experiences a subarctic climate (Köppen climate classification Dfc) that falls just short of being classified as a Humid continental climate (Köppen Dfb). A record snowfall occurred on November 16, 1984, with 19.4 centimetres (7.6 in) and 57.8 millimetres (2.28 in) of rain falling on May 17, 1984. A record snowfall depth was recorded on February 22, 1997, when 58 centimetres (23 in) were measured. January 11, 1986, was very cold with wind gusting to 104 kilometres (65 mi) per hour. The coldest temperature ever recorded was −51.7 °C (−61 °F) on 8 January 1930.and the coldest wind chill was −55.8 on December 20, 1989.

The highest humidex was set at a high of 40.4 on August 10, 1991. The highest temperature ever recorded in Meadow Lake was 38.0 °C (100.4 °F) on 27 June 2002. The record high daily minimum was 20.6 °C (69.1 °F) recorded July 10, 2024. The record highest dew point was 23.8 °C (74.8 °F) recorded August 10, 2018. The month with the highest humidity, and also the warmest month, was July 2007 with an average dew point of 15.0 °C (59.0 °F), and an average mean temperature of 21.3 °C (70.3 °F).

Climate data for Meadow Lake Airport, 1991–2020 normals, extremes 1923–present
Month	Jan	Feb	Mar	Apr	May	Jun	Jul	Aug	Sep	Oct	Nov	Dec	Year
Record high humidex	7.8	9.1	17.3	29.6	35.8	40.5	43.0	41.3	37.0	28.0	18.2	9.8	43.0
Record high °C (°F)	9.0 (48.2)	9.5 (49.1)	18.6 (65.5)	32.8 (91.0)	35.6 (96.1)	38.0 (100.4)	37.2 (99.0)	37.2 (99.0)	33.3 (91.9)	28.7 (83.7)	19.2 (66.6)	11.2 (52.2)	38.0 (100.4)
Mean maximum °C (°F)	4.6 (40.3)	4.3 (39.7)	10.7 (51.3)	21.3 (70.3)	28.2 (82.8)	28.9 (84.0)	30.8 (87.4)	31.1 (88.0)	26.9 (80.4)	20.5 (68.9)	8.5 (47.3)	3.5 (38.3)	32.5 (90.5)
Mean daily maximum °C (°F)	−10.7 (12.7)	−7.8 (18.0)	−0.7 (30.7)	9.1 (48.4)	17.3 (63.1)	21.2 (70.2)	23.7 (74.7)	22.7 (72.9)	17.2 (63.0)	8.5 (47.3)	−2.1 (28.2)	−9 (16)	7.5 (45.5)
Daily mean °C (°F)	−16.8 (1.8)	−14.5 (5.9)	−7.4 (18.7)	2.5 (36.5)	9.5 (49.1)	14.5 (58.1)	16.8 (62.2)	15.4 (59.7)	10.1 (50.2)	2.6 (36.7)	−7.1 (19.2)	−14.7 (5.5)	0.9 (33.6)
Mean daily minimum °C (°F)	−22.8 (−9.0)	−21.2 (−6.2)	−14 (7)	−4.1 (24.6)	1.7 (35.1)	7.5 (45.5)	9.8 (49.6)	8.1 (46.6)	3.0 (37.4)	−3.4 (25.9)	−12 (10)	−20.4 (−4.7)	−5.7 (21.7)
Mean minimum °C (°F)	−39.7 (−39.5)	−36.7 (−34.1)	−31.7 (−25.1)	−14.8 (5.4)	−6.9 (19.6)	0.3 (32.5)	3.9 (39.0)	1.0 (33.8)	−5.2 (22.6)	−13.1 (8.4)	−25.0 (−13.0)	−34.9 (−30.8)	−41.5 (−42.7)
Record low °C (°F)	−51.7 (−61.1)	−46.7 (−52.1)	−43.3 (−45.9)	−31.8 (−25.2)	−13 (9)	−6.2 (20.8)	−0.2 (31.6)	−3.7 (25.3)	−12.2 (10.0)	−22.7 (−8.9)	−41.5 (−42.7)	−47 (−53)	−51.7 (−61.1)
Record low wind chill	−58.6	−57.0	−51.2	−38.1	−16.4	−11.2	0.0	−5.5	−14.3	−28.3	−47.4	−56.0	−58.6
Average precipitation mm (inches)	16.6 (0.65)	9.7 (0.38)	12.5 (0.49)	24.7 (0.97)	37.9 (1.49)	75.6 (2.98)	76.2 (3.00)	60.9 (2.40)	36.8 (1.45)	22.3 (0.88)	16.8 (0.66)	16.7 (0.66)	406.7 (16.01)
Average rainfall mm (inches)	0.3 (0.01)	0.3 (0.01)	1.9 (0.07)	13.5 (0.53)	38.5 (1.52)	69.2 (2.72)	69.2 (2.72)	62.8 (2.47)	43.6 (1.72)	16.4 (0.65)	1.6 (0.06)	0.9 (0.04)	318.2 (12.53)
Average snowfall cm (inches)	22.6 (8.9)	14.6 (5.7)	14.5 (5.7)	15.7 (6.2)	2.0 (0.8)	0.1 (0.0)	0.0 (0.0)	0.4 (0.2)	0.7 (0.3)	8.7 (3.4)	21.7 (8.5)	23.6 (9.3)	124.6 (49.1)
Average dew point °C (°F)	−19.0 (−2.2)	−16.9 (1.6)	−10.9 (12.4)	−3.8 (25.2)	1.4 (34.5)	8.6 (47.5)	12.2 (54.0)	10.8 (51.4)	5.3 (41.5)	−1.6 (29.1)	−9.2 (15.4)	−16.6 (2.1)	−3.3 (26.1)
Mean monthly sunshine hours	92.7	123.4	173.7	219.8	260.1	265.4	288.1	268.9	173.2	136.4	79.2	74.3	2,155.2
Percentage possible sunshine	37.4	44.9	47.4	52.3	52.5	51.8	56.1	58.3	45.3	41.6	30.7	32.1	45.9
Source 1: Environment Canada
Source 2: weatherstats.ca (for dewpoint and monthly&yearly average absolute maximum&minimum temperature)

== Government ==
Meadow Lake has a mayor who is the highest-ranking government official. Voters also elect aldermen or councillors to form the municipal council. The current mayor is Merlin Seymour, who was re-elected by acclamation in 2024.

Provincially, Meadow Lake is within the Meadow Lake constituency. It is currently represented by its Member of the Legislative Assembly (MLA), Jeremy Harrison of the Saskatchewan Party, who was re-elected in October 2024.

Federally, Meadow Lake is represented in the House of Commons of Canada by its Member of Parliament (MP) for the Battlefords—Lloydminster—Meadow Lake riding, Rosemarie Falk of the Conservative Party of Canada, who was elected in April 2025.

== Economy ==
The tourism, fishing, fur, pulpwood, forestry, agricultural grains, livestock, dairy and poultry product industries all support Meadow Lake, which boasted seven grain elevators in 1955. Meadow Lake was processing three million bushels of grain in 1953, the highest amount for a single Canadian community.

Currently, the city's heavy industry is dominated by the primary forestry industry and related service companies, including trucking and forestry management companies. The forest companies include NorSask Forest Products Inc., Meadow Lake Mechanical Pulp Ltd. and the Meadow Lake OSB Limited Partnership. Support industries include Mistik Management and various privately held trucking companies.

Meadow Lake acts as a business hub in its local area, providing services for the smaller surrounding communities of Dorintosh and Rapid View and surrounding reserves, including the Flying Dust First Nation and the Eagles Lake reserve.

The First Nation communities and their relative success are a significant component of the Meadow Lake economy. The Flying Dust First Nation, which directly borders the town, owns and operates many of the city's most profitable industries, including direct ownership of NorSask Forest Products Inc., a portion of the Meadow Lake OSB Partnership, stakes in local trucking and service companies, and a sizeable farming operation which is currently limited to leasing the vast amounts of local property they own or have title on.

The agricultural community is also sizeable, including cereal production and ranching operations. The most pristine agricultural lands are closest to the city, whereas the surrounding areas become less suitable for farming and more amenable to ranching towards the north, with the Canadian Shield or east to the St. Cyr Hills. The city boasts one stockyard and two major agricultural equipment dealers.

The community is home to the SaskPower Meadow Lake Power Station.

== Education ==
Meadow Lake is served by Transition Place Education Centre, Carpenter High, Jonas Samson Junior High, Lakeview Elementary, Jubilee Elementary, Gateway Elementary, and North West Regional College, which offers college and university-level courses. University courses, including complete, community-based Bachelor of Education and Master of Education programs, are offered by the University of Regina.

In the spring of 2005, the Government of Saskatchewan invested CA$41,000 to upgrade the roof at Jonas Samson Junior High School. Academy of Learning AOL is a post-secondary career and business college in Meadow Lake. For the school year 2007–2008, Lakeview Elementary School started a much-anticipated French Immersion Program. Historically, the Meadow Lake area was served by several one-room schoolhouses, the closest being the Meadow Lake School District #1201, Township 59, range 17, west of the 3rd Meridian.

== Local media ==
=== Newspapers ===
The Northern Pride is a weekly newspaper based in Meadow Lake and serves northwestern Saskatchewan. The Meadow Lake Progress was a local newspaper published from 1931 to 2013.

=== Radio ===
CJNS-FM 102.3 and CFDM-FM 105.7 are the local radio stations. The town is also served by CBKM-FM 98.5, a repeater of CBK-AM 540 in Watrous.

== Transportation ==
Meadow Lake is located on Highway 55 and Highway 4. The Prince Albert – Leoville – Meadow Lake – North Battleford Canadian Pacific Railway reached Meadow Lake Station at Section 26, Township 59, Range 17, west of the Third Meridian in 1931. Meadow Lake Airport (IATA: YLJ, ICAO: CYLJ) is located 2 NM (3.7 km; 2.3 mi) west of Meadow Lake.

== Attractions ==
Meadow Lake's Tourist Information Centre is located on Highway 4 South in the Meadow Lake Lions Park. The building is shared by the Meadow Lake Museum Society, Northern Saskatchewan Tourism, and the Meadow Lake Chamber of Commerce.

Meadow Lake Provincial Park, located about 40 kilometres (25 mi) to the north, takes its name from the city. Other nearby parks include Meadow Lake Lions Park, Nesset Lake Recreation Site, and Saint Cyr Hills Trails Recreation Site.

Meadow Lake Golf Club is an 18-hole golf course on the south side of Meadow Lake, along Highway 4. Meadow Lake is directly east of the golf course. The golf course was built in 1952 and is a par 72 with a total of 6,432 yards. The course also features a 20-tee driving range.

== Notable people ==
Notable persons who were born, grew up, or established their fame in Meadow Lake:

- William Bleasdell Cameron (1862–1951) — survivor of the Frog Lake Massacre, author, journalist
- Blake Comeau — 2006 World Junior Ice Hockey Championships gold medallist, NHL hockey player with the Dallas Stars
- Jeff Friesen — former NHL hockey player, Stanley Cup Champion (2003)
- Joe Handley — former Premier of the Northwest Territories
- Jeremy Harrison — current MLA
- Dakota Ray Hebert — actress and comedian
- D. J. King — former NHL hockey player
- Dwight King — former NHL and current KHL hockey player who was a member of the Kings' Stanley Cup championship teams in 2012 and 2014.
- Merlin Malinowski — former NHL hockey player
- George McLeod — former Saskatchewan Cabinet Minister and Deputy Premier
- Jon Mirasty — AHL hockey player
- Mike Siklenka — AHL hockey player
- Maynard Sonntag — former Saskatchewan Cabinet Minister
- Jeremy Yablonski — NHL and AHL hockey player

== Gallery ==
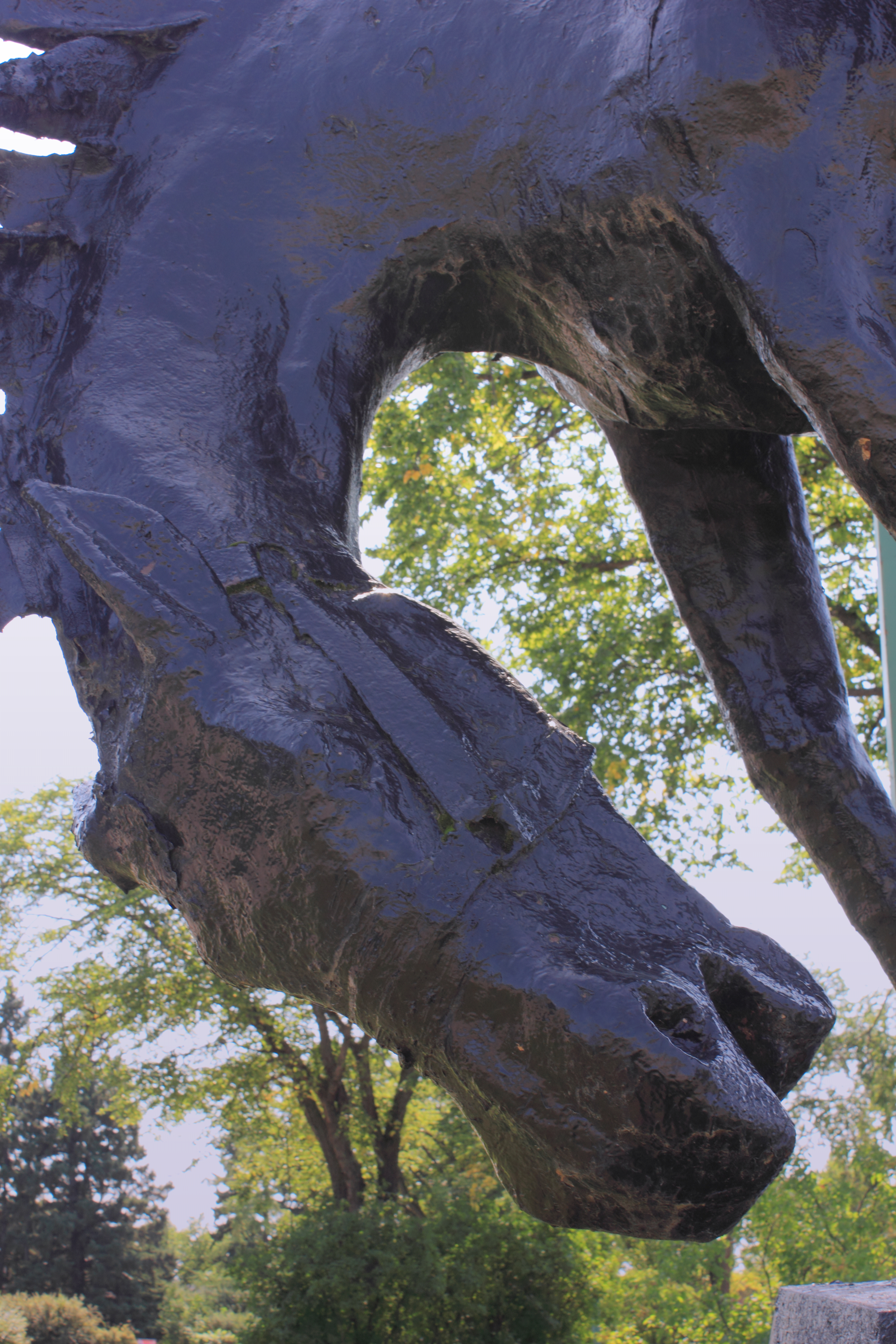
Portion of the rider on horseback statue, which honours the pioneers of the area

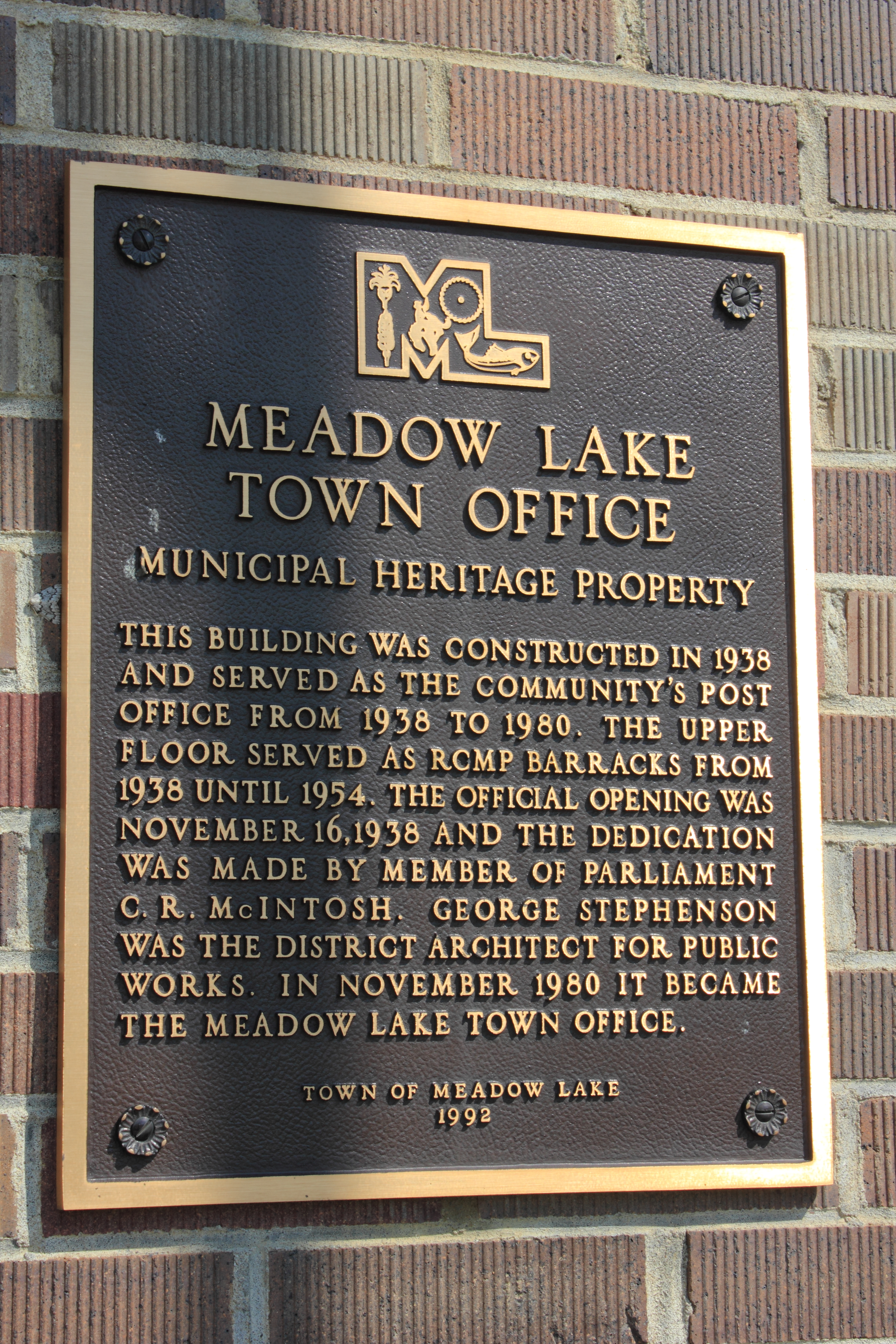
Plaque on Meadow Lake City Hall (Heritage Building)

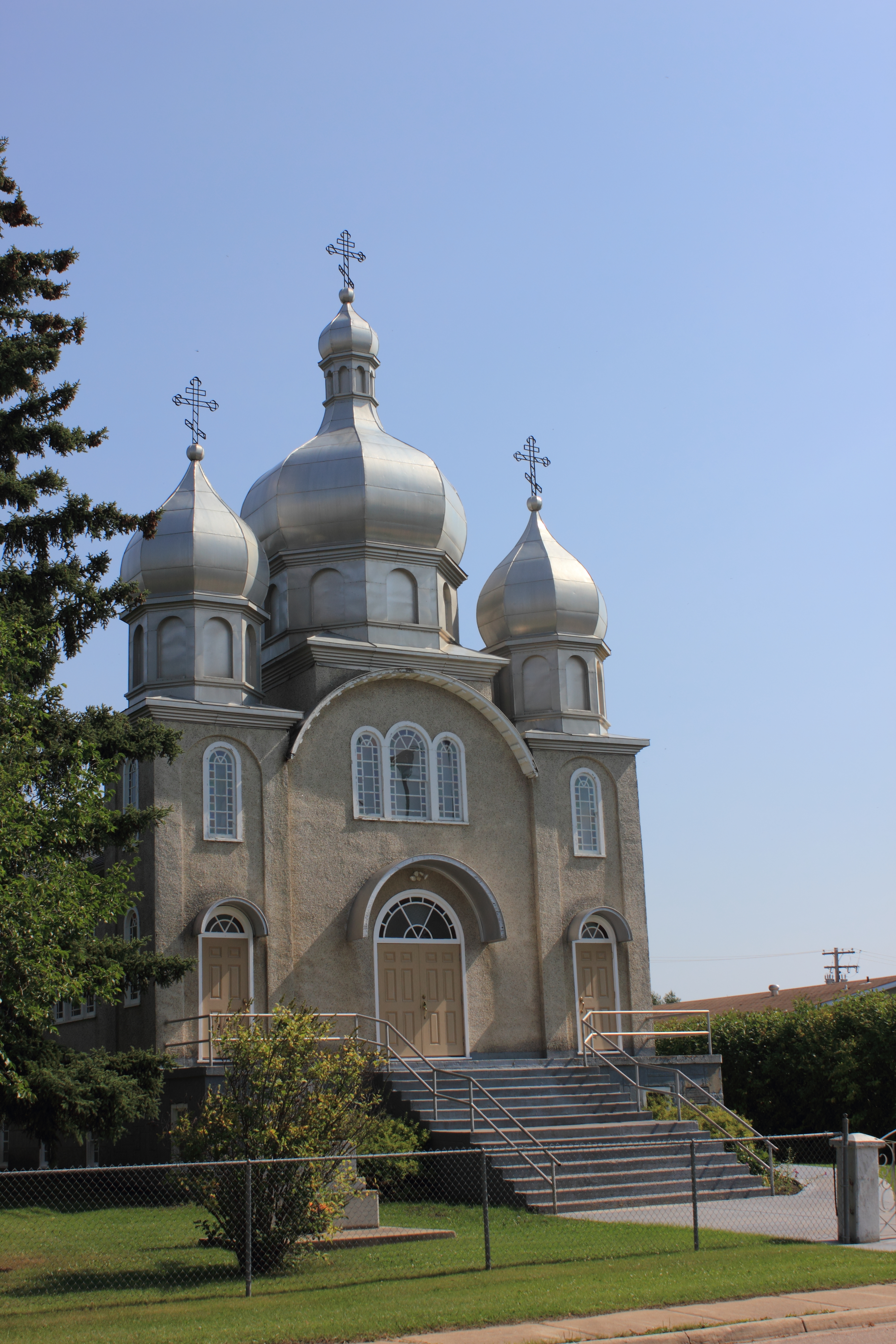
Ukrainian Greek Orthodox Church of All Saints

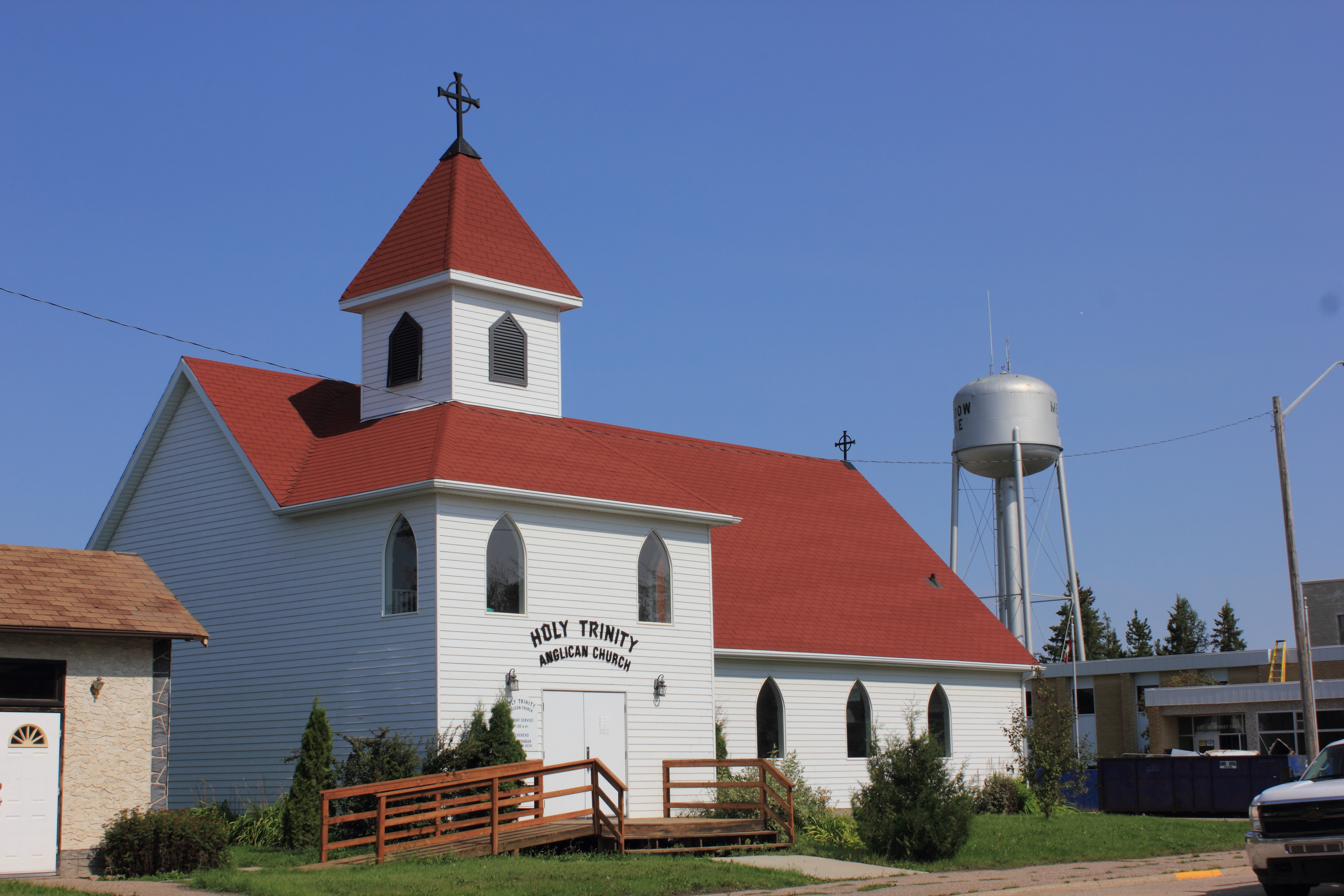
Holy Trinity Anglican Church

== See also ==
- List of communities in Saskatchewan
- List of cities in Saskatchewan
- List of Hudson's Bay Company trading posts

== Book reference ==
- Meadow Lake Diamond Jubilee Heritage Group (1981). "Heritage memories : a history of Meadow Lake and surrounding districts". Meadow Lake, Sask.
- Fieguth, Joyce (2003) [1973]. Flour sacks and binder twine. Belleville, Ont: Epic Press. ISBN 1-55306-686-3.
- Miller, Marlene (c. 2006). Voice of the elders. Meadow Lake Tribal Council.
- Emke, Harold. A history of education in the Meadow Lake area, 1912-1988. Meadow Lake, Sask.: Meadow Lake School Division No. 66, 1990.
- Christiansen, E.A.; Padbury, G.A. (1975). Meadow Lake Geolog : the land, past and present. Museum's Branch, Dept. of Tourism and Renewable Resources in cooperation with the Saskatchewan Research Council.
