= List of House members of the 39th Parliament of Canada =

This is a list of members of the House of Commons of Canada in the 39th Parliament of Canada (April 3, 2006 to September 7, 2008).

Conservative
Liberal
Bloc Québécois
New Democratic
Green
Independent

== Members ==
- Bold text denotes cabinet ministers (two cabinet members, Senator Michael Fortier and Senator Marjory LeBreton are not members of the House).
- Italic text denotes party leaders.
- The prime minister is **both**.
- The speaker is indicated by "†".
- Parliamentary secretaries is indicated by "‡".

=== Alberta ===
Name	Party	Electoral district	First elected / previously elected	No. of terms
Lee Richardson	Conservative	Calgary Centre	1988, (Note: Calgary Southeast) 2004	3rd term*
**Jim Prentice**	Conservative	Calgary Centre-North	2004	2nd term
Deepak Obhrai ‡	Conservative	Calgary East	1997	4th term
Art Hanger	Conservative	Calgary Northeast	1993	5th term
**Diane Ablonczy** ‡	Conservative	Calgary—Nose Hill	1993	5th term
**Jason Kenney** ‡	Conservative	Calgary Southeast	1997	4th term
**Stephen Harper**	Conservative	Calgary Southwest	1993, (Note: Calgary West) 2002	4th term*
Rob Anders	Conservative	Calgary West	1997	4th term
Kevin Sorenson	Conservative	Crowfoot	2000	3rd term
Laurie Hawn	Conservative	Edmonton Centre	2006	1st term
Peter Goldring	Conservative	Edmonton East	1997	4th term
James Rajotte	Conservative	Edmonton—Leduc	2000	3rd term
Michael Lake	Conservative	Edmonton—Mill Woods—Beaumont	2006	1st term
Rahim Jaffer	Conservative	Edmonton—Strathcona	1997	4th term
John Williams	Conservative	Edmonton—St. Albert	1993	5th term
Ken Epp	Conservative	Edmonton—Sherwood Park	1993	5th term
**Rona Ambrose**	Conservative	Edmonton—Spruce Grove	2004	2nd term
Brian Jean ‡	Conservative	Fort McMurray—Athabasca	2004	2nd term
Rick Casson	Conservative	Lethbridge	1997	4th term
Ted Menzies ‡	Conservative	Macleod	2004	2nd term
**Monte Solberg**	Conservative	Medicine Hat	1993	5th term
Chris Warkentin	Conservative	Peace River	2006	1st term
Bob Mills	Conservative	Red Deer	1993	5th term
Leon Benoit	Conservative	Vegreville—Wainwright	1993	5th term
Brian Storseth	Conservative	Westlock—St. Paul	2006	1st term
Blaine Calkins	Conservative	Wetaskiwin	2006	1st term
Myron Thompson	Conservative	Wild Rose	1993	5th term
Rob Merrifield	Conservative	Yellowhead	2000	3rd term

=== British Columbia ===
Name	Party	Electoral district	First elected / previously elected	No. of terms
Ed Fast	Conservative	Abbotsford	2006	1st term
Alex Atamanenko	New Democratic	British Columbia Southern Interior	2006	1st term
Bill Siksay	New Democratic	Burnaby—Douglas	2004	2nd term
Peter Julian	New Democratic	Burnaby—New Westminster	2004	2nd term
Richard Harris	Conservative	Cariboo—Prince George	1993	5th term
**Chuck Strahl**	Conservative	Chilliwack—Fraser Canyon	1993	5th term
John Cummins	Conservative	Delta—Richmond East	1993	5th term
Keith Martin	Liberal	Esquimalt—Juan de Fuca	1993 (Note: First elected as a member of the Reform/Canadian Alliance party)	5th term
Nina Grewal	Conservative	Fleetwood—Port Kells	2004	2nd term
Betty Hinton ‡	Conservative	Kamloops—Thompson—Cariboo	2000	3rd term
Ron Cannan	Conservative	Kelowna—Lake Country	2006	1st term
Jim Abbott ‡	Conservative	Kootenay—Columbia	1993	5th term
Mark Warawa ‡	Conservative	Langley	2004	2nd term
James Lunney	Conservative	Nanaimo—Alberni	2000	3rd term
Jean Crowder	New Democratic	Nanaimo—Cowichan	2004	2nd term
Dawn Black	New Democratic	New Westminster—Coquitlam	1988, 2006	2nd term*
Sukh Dhaliwal	Liberal	Newton—North Delta	2006	1st term
Don Bell	Liberal	North Vancouver	2004	2nd term
**Stockwell Day**	Conservative	Okanagan—Coquihalla	2000	4th term
Colin Mayes	Conservative	Okanagan—Shuswap	2006	1st term
Randy Kamp ‡	Conservative	Pitt Meadows—Maple Ridge—Mission	2004	2nd term
**James Moore** ‡	Conservative	Port Moody—Westwood—Port Coquitlam	2000	3rd term
**Jay Hill**	Conservative	Prince George—Peace River	1993	5th term
Raymond Chan	Liberal	Richmond	1993, 2004	4th term*
**Gary Lunn**	Conservative	Saanich—Gulf Islands	1997	4th term
Russ Hiebert ‡	Conservative	South Surrey—White Rock—Cloverdale	2004	2nd term
Nathan Cullen	New Democratic	Skeena—Bulkley Valley	2004	2nd term
Penny Priddy	New Democratic	Surrey North	2006	1st term
Hedy Fry	Liberal	Vancouver Centre	1993	5th term
Libby Davies	New Democratic	Vancouver East	1997	4th term
Catherine Bell	New Democratic	Vancouver Island North	2006	1st term
**David Emerson**	Liberal	Vancouver Kingsway	2004	2nd term
**David Emerson**	Conservative (Note: Elected as a Liberal)	Vancouver Kingsway	2004	2nd term
Stephen Owen	Liberal	Vancouver Quadra	2000	3rd term
Joyce Murray (2008) (Note: Elected in a March 17, 2008, by-election)	Liberal	Vancouver Quadra	2008	1st term
Ujjal Dosanjh	Liberal	Vancouver South	2004	2nd term
Denise Savoie	New Democratic	Victoria	2006	1st term
Blair Wilson	Liberal (Note: Elected as a Liberal; on August 30, 2008, Wilson declared that he would sit as Canada's first Green member of Parliament.)	West Vancouver—Sunshine Coast—Sea to Sky Country	2006	1st term
Blair Wilson	Independent	West Vancouver—Sunshine Coast—Sea to Sky Country	2006	1st term
Blair Wilson	Green	West Vancouver—Sunshine Coast—Sea to Sky Country	2006	1st term

=== Manitoba ===
Name	Party	Electoral district	First elected / previously elected	No. of terms
Merv Tweed	Conservative	Brandon—Souris	2004	2nd term
Steven Fletcher ‡	Conservative	Charleswood—St. James—Assiniboia	2004	2nd term
Tina Keeper	Liberal	Churchill	2006	1st term
Inky Mark	Conservative	Dauphin—Swan River—Marquette	1997	4th term
Bill Blaikie	New Democratic	Elmwood—Transcona	1979	9th term
Joy Smith	Conservative	Kildonan—St. Paul	2004	2nd term
Brian Pallister ‡	Conservative	Portage—Lisgar	2000	3rd term
**Vic Toews**	Conservative	Provencher	2000	3rd term
Raymond Simard	Liberal	Saint Boniface	2002	3rd term
James Bezan	Conservative	Selkirk—Interlake	2004	2nd term
Pat Martin	New Democratic	Winnipeg Centre	1997	4th term
Judy Wasylycia-Leis	New Democratic	Winnipeg North	1997	4th term
Rod Bruinooge ‡	Conservative	Winnipeg South	2006	1st term
Anita Neville	Liberal	Winnipeg South Centre	2000	3rd term

=== New Brunswick ===
Name	Party	Electoral district	First elected / previously elected	No. of terms
Yvon Godin	New Democratic	Acadie—Bathurst	1997	4th term
Dominic LeBlanc	Liberal	Beauséjour	2000	3rd term
Andy Scott	Liberal	Fredericton	1993	5th term
Rob Moore ‡	Conservative	Fundy Royal	2004	2nd term
Jean-Claude D'Amours	Liberal	Madawaska—Restigouche	2004	2nd term
Charles Hubbard	Liberal	Miramichi	1993	5th term
Brian Murphy	Liberal	Moncton—Riverview—Dieppe	2006	1st term
**Greg Thompson**	Conservative	New Brunswick Southwest	1988, 1997	5th term*
Paul Zed	Liberal	Saint John	1993, (Note: Fundy Royal) 2004	3rd term*
Mike Allen	Conservative	Tobique—Mactaquac	2006	1st term

=== Newfoundland and Labrador ===
Name	Party	Electoral district	First elected / previously elected	No. of terms
Fabian Manning	Conservative	Avalon	2006	1st term
Scott Simms	Liberal	Bonavista—Gander—Grand Falls—Windsor	2004	2nd term
Gerry Byrne	Liberal	Humber—St. Barbe—Baie Verte	1996	5th term
Todd Russell	Liberal	Labrador	2005	2nd term
Bill Matthews	Liberal	Random—Burin—St. George's	1997 (Note: First elected as a Progressive Conservative)	4th term
Norman Doyle	Conservative	St. John's East	1997	4th term
**Loyola Hearn**	Conservative	St. John's South—Mount Pearl	2000	4th term

=== Nova Scotia ===
Name	Party	Electoral District	First elected / previously elected	No. of terms
Rodger Cuzner	Liberal	Cape Breton—Canso	2000	3rd term
**Peter MacKay**	Conservative	Central Nova	1997	4th term
Bill Casey	Conservative	Cumberland—Colchester—Musquodoboit Valley	1988, 1997	5th term*
Bill Casey	Independent	Cumberland—Colchester—Musquodoboit Valley	1988, 1997	5th term*
Michael Savage	Liberal	Dartmouth—Cole Harbour	2004	2nd term
Alexa McDonough	New Democratic	Halifax	1997	4th term
Geoff Regan	Liberal	Halifax West	1993, 2000	4th term*
Scott Brison	Liberal	Kings—Hants	1997, 2000	4th term*
Peter Stoffer	New Democratic	Sackville—Eastern Shore	1997	4th term
Gerald Keddy ‡	Conservative	South Shore—St. Margaret's	1997	4th term
Mark Eyking	Liberal	Sydney—Victoria	2000	3rd term
Robert Thibault	Liberal	West Nova	2000	3rd term

=== Ontario ===
Name	Party	Electoral district	First elected / previously elected	No. of terms
Mark Holland	Liberal	Ajax—Pickering	2004	2nd term
Brent St. Denis	Liberal	Algoma—Manitoulin—Kapuskasing	1993	5th term
David Sweet	Conservative	Ancaster—Dundas—Flamborough—Westdale	2006	1st term
Patrick Brown	Conservative	Barrie	2006	1st term
Maria Minna	Liberal	Beaches—East York	1993	5th term
Gurbax Malhi	Liberal	Bramalea—Gore—Malton	1993	5th term
Ruby Dhalla	Liberal	Brampton—Springdale	2004	2nd term
Colleen Beaumier	Liberal	Brampton West	1993	5th term
Lloyd St. Amand	Liberal	Brant	2004	2nd term
Larry Miller	Conservative	Bruce—Grey—Owen Sound	2004	2nd term
Mike Wallace	Conservative	Burlington	2006	1st term
Gary Goodyear	Conservative	Cambridge	2004	2nd term
**Gordon O'Connor**	Conservative	Carleton—Mississippi Mills	2004	2nd term
Dave Van Kesteren	Conservative	Chatham-Kent—Essex	2006	1st term
Mario Silva	Liberal	Davenport	2004	2nd term
Yasmin Ratansi	Liberal	Don Valley East	2004	2nd term
John Godfrey	Liberal	Don Valley West	1993	5th term
Vacant		Don Valley West	1993	5th term
David Tilson	Conservative	Dufferin—Caledon	2004	2nd term
**Bev Oda**	Conservative	Durham	2004	2nd term
Joe Volpe	Liberal	Eglinton—Lawrence	1988	6th term
Joe Preston	Conservative	Elgin—Middlesex—London	2004	2nd term
Jeff Watson	Conservative	Essex	2004	2nd term
Borys Wrzesnewskyj	Liberal	Etobicoke Centre	2004	2nd term
Michael Ignatieff	Liberal	Etobicoke—Lakeshore	2006	1st term
Roy Cullen	Liberal	Etobicoke North	1996	5th term
Pierre Lemieux ‡	Conservative	Glengarry—Prescott—Russell	2006	1st term
Brenda Chamberlain	Liberal	Guelph	1993	5th term
Vacant		Guelph	1993	5th term
**Diane Finley**	Conservative	Haldimand—Norfolk	2004	2nd term
Barry Devolin	Conservative	Haliburton—Kawartha Lakes—Brock	2004	2nd term
Garth Turner	Conservative	Halton	1988, 2006	2nd term*
Garth Turner	Independent	Halton	1988, 2006	2nd term*
Garth Turner	Liberal (Note: Elected as a Conservative)	Halton	1988, 2006	2nd term*
David Christopherson	New Democratic	Hamilton Centre	2004	2nd term
Wayne Marston	New Democratic	Hamilton East—Stoney Creek	2006	1st term
Chris Charlton	New Democratic	Hamilton Mountain	2006	1st term
Paul Steckle	Liberal	Huron—Bruce	1993	5th term
Roger Valley	Liberal	Kenora	2004	2nd term
Peter Milliken †	Liberal	Kingston and the Islands	1988	6th term
Karen Redman	Liberal	Kitchener Centre	1997	4th term
Harold Albrecht	Conservative	Kitchener—Conestoga	2006	1st term
Andrew Telegdi	Liberal	Kitchener—Waterloo	1993	5th term
Bev Shipley	Conservative	Lambton—Kent—Middlesex	2006	1st term
Scott Reid	Conservative	Lanark—Frontenac—Lennox and Addington	2000	3rd term
Gord Brown	Conservative	Leeds—Grenville	2004	2nd term
Irene Mathyssen	New Democratic	London—Fanshawe	2006	1st term
Joe Fontana	Liberal	London North Centre	1988	6th term
Glen Pearson (2006) (Note: Member since December 7, 2006 (elected in a November 27 by-election))	Liberal	London North Centre	2006	1st term
Sue Barnes	Liberal	London West	1993	5th term
John McCallum	Liberal	Markham—Unionville	2000	3rd term
Navdeep Bains	Liberal	Mississauga—Brampton South	2004	2nd term
Albina Guarnieri	Liberal	Mississauga East—Cooksville	1988	6th term
Omar Alghabra	Liberal	Mississauga—Erindale	2006	1st term
Paul Szabo	Liberal	Mississauga South	1993	5th term
Wajid Khan	Liberal	Mississauga—Streetsville	2004	2nd term
Wajid Khan	Conservative	Mississauga—Streetsville	2004	2nd term
Wajid Khan	Independent	Mississauga—Streetsville	2004	2nd term
Wajid Khan	Conservative	Mississauga—Streetsville	2004	2nd term
Pierre Poilievre ‡	Conservative	Nepean—Carleton	2004	2nd term
Belinda Stronach	Liberal	Newmarket—Aurora	2004	2nd term
**Rob Nicholson**	Conservative	Niagara Falls	1984, 2004	4th term*
Dean Allison	Conservative	Niagara West—Glanbrook	2004	2nd term
Raymond Bonin	Liberal	Nickel Belt	1993	5th term
Anthony Rota	Liberal	Nipissing—Timiskaming	2004	2nd term
Rick Norlock	Conservative	Northumberland—Quinte West	2006	1st term
Bonnie Brown	Liberal	Oakville	1993	5th term
Lui Temelkovski	Liberal	Oak Ridges—Markham	2004	2nd term
Colin Carrie ‡	Conservative	Oshawa	2004	2nd term
Paul Dewar	New Democratic	Ottawa Centre	2006	1st term
Royal Galipeau	Conservative	Ottawa—Orléans	2006	1st term
David McGuinty	Liberal	Ottawa South	2004	2nd term
Mauril Bélanger	Liberal	Ottawa—Vanier	1995	5th term
**John Baird**	Conservative	Ottawa West—Nepean	2006	1st term
Dave MacKenzie ‡	Conservative	Oxford	2004	2nd term
Peggy Nash	New Democratic	Parkdale—High Park	2006	1st term
**Tony Clement**	Conservative	Parry Sound-Muskoka	2006	1st term
Gary Schellenberger	Conservative	Perth Wellington	2003	3rd term
Dean Del Mastro	Conservative	Peterborough	2006	1st term
Dan McTeague	Liberal	Pickering—Scarborough East	1993	5th term
Daryl Kramp	Conservative	Prince Edward—Hastings	2004	2nd term
Cheryl Gallant	Conservative	Renfrew—Nipissing—Pembroke	2000	3rd term
Bryon Wilfert	Liberal	Richmond Hill	1997	4th term
Pat Davidson	Conservative	Sarnia—Lambton	2006	1st term
Tony Martin	New Democratic	Sault Ste. Marie	2004	2nd term
Jim Karygiannis	Liberal	Scarborough—Agincourt	1988	6th term
John Cannis	Liberal	Scarborough Centre	1993	5th term
John McKay	Liberal	Scarborough—Guildwood	1997	4th term
Tom Wappel	Liberal	Scarborough Southwest	1988	6th term
Derek Lee	Liberal	Scarborough—Rouge River	1988	6th term
**Helena Guergis** ‡	Conservative	Simcoe—Grey	2004	2nd term
Bruce Stanton	Conservative	Simcoe North	2006	1st term
Rick Dykstra	Conservative	St. Catharines	2006	1st term
Carolyn Bennett	Liberal	St. Paul's	1997	4th term
Guy Lauzon ‡	Conservative	Stormont—Dundas—South Glengarry	2004	2nd term
Diane Marleau	Liberal	Sudbury	1988	6th term
Susan Kadis	Liberal	Thornhill	2004	2nd term
Ken Boshcoff	Liberal	Thunder Bay—Rainy River	2004	2nd term
Joe Comuzzi	Liberal	Thunder Bay—Superior North	1988	6th term
Joe Comuzzi	Independent	Thunder Bay—Superior North	1988	6th term
Joe Comuzzi	Conservative	Thunder Bay—Superior North	1988	6th term
Charlie Angus	New Democratic	Timmins-James Bay	2004	2nd term
Bill Graham (Note: Party leader until December 2, 2006)	Liberal	Toronto Centre	1993	5th term
Bob Rae (2008)	Liberal	Toronto Centre	1978, (Note: Broadview/Broadview—Greenwood (First elected as a New Democrat)) 2008	4th term*
Jack Layton	New Democratic	Toronto—Danforth	2004	2nd term
Olivia Chow	New Democratic	Trinity—Spadina	2006	1st term
Maurizio Bevilacqua	Liberal	Vaughan	1988	6th term
John Maloney	Liberal	Welland	1993	5th term
**Michael Chong** (Note: Cabinet minister until November 27, 2006)	Conservative	Wellington—Halton Hills	2004	2nd term
**Jim Flaherty**	Conservative	Whitby—Oshawa	2006	1st term
Jim Peterson	Liberal	Willowdale	1980, 1988	7th term*
Martha Hall Findlay (2008)	Liberal	Willowdale	2008	1st term
Joe Comartin	New Democratic	Windsor—Tecumseh	2000	3rd term
Brian Masse	New Democratic	Windsor West	2002	3rd term
Ken Dryden	Liberal	York Centre	2004	2nd term
**Peter Van Loan** (Note: Cabinet minister since November 27, 2006)‡	Conservative	York—Simcoe	2004	2nd term
Alan Tonks	Liberal	York South—Weston	2000	3rd term
Judy Sgro	Liberal	York West	1999	4th term

=== Prince Edward Island ===
Name	Party	Electoral District	First elected / previously elected	No. of terms
Lawrence MacAulay	Liberal	Cardigan	1988	6th term
Shawn Murphy	Liberal	Charlottetown	2000	3rd term
Joe McGuire	Liberal	Egmont	1988	6th term
Wayne Easter	Liberal	Malpeque	1993	5th term

=== Quebec ===
Name	Party	Electoral district	First elected / previously elected	No. of terms
Yvon Lévesque	Bloc Québécois	Abitibi—Baie-James—Nunavik—Eeyou	2004	2nd term
Marc Lemay	Bloc Québécois	Abitibi—Témiscamingue	2004	2nd term
Maria Mourani	Bloc Québécois	Ahuntsic	2006	1st term
Robert Carrier	Bloc Québécois	Alfred-Pellan	2004	2nd term
Mario Laframboise	Bloc Québécois	Argenteuil—Papineau—Mirabel	2000	3rd term
Louis Plamondon	Bloc Québécois	Bas-Richelieu—Nicolet—Bécancour	1984	7th term
**Maxime Bernier**	Conservative	Beauce	2006	1st term
Claude DeBellefeuille	Bloc Québécois	Beauharnois—Salaberry	2006	1st term
Sylvie Boucher ‡	Conservative	Beauport—Limoilou	2006	1st term
Guy André	Bloc Québécois	Berthier—Maskinongé	2004	2nd term
Denis Coderre	Liberal	Bourassa	1997	4th term
Christian Ouellet	Bloc Québécois	Brome—Missisquoi	2006	1st term
Marcel Lussier	Bloc Québécois	Brossard—La Prairie	2006	1st term
Yves Lessard	Bloc Québécois	Chambly—Borduas	2004	2nd term
Daniel Petit	Conservative	Charlesbourg—Haute-Saint-Charles	2006	1st term
Carole Freeman	Bloc Québécois	Châteauguay—Saint-Constant	2006	1st term
Robert Bouchard	Bloc Québécois	Chicoutimi—Le Fjord	2004	2nd term
France Bonsant	Bloc Québécois	Compton—Stanstead	2004	2nd term
Pauline Picard	Bloc Québécois	Drummond	1993	5th term
Raynald Blais	Bloc Québécois	Gaspésie—Îles-de-la-Madeleine	2004	2nd term
Richard Nadeau	Bloc Québécois	Gatineau	2006	1st term
Jean-Yves Roy	Bloc Québécois	Haute-Gaspésie—La Mitis—Matane—Matapédia	2000	3rd term
Réal Ménard	Bloc Québécois	Hochelaga	1993	5th term
Pablo Rodriguez	Liberal	Honoré-Mercier	2004	2nd term
Marcel Proulx	Liberal	Hull—Aylmer	1999	4th term
Thierry St-Cyr	Bloc Québécois	Jeanne-Le Ber	2006	1st term
Pierre Paquette	Bloc Québécois	Joliette	2000	3rd term
**Jean-Pierre Blackburn**	Conservative	Jonquière—Alma	1984, 2006	3rd term*
Francine Lalonde	Bloc Québécois	La Pointe-de-l'Île	1993	5th term
Francis Scarpaleggia	Liberal	Lac-Saint-Louis	2004	2nd term
Paul Martin	Liberal	LaSalle—Émard	1988	6th term
Johanne Deschamps	Bloc Québécois	Laurentides—Labelle	2004	2nd term
Gilles Duceppe	Bloc Québécois	Laurier—Sainte-Marie	1990	6th term
Nicole Demers	Bloc Québécois	Laval	2004	2nd term
Raymonde Folco	Liberal	Laval—Les Îles	1997	4th term
Steven Blaney	Conservative	Lévis—Bellechasse	2006	1st term
Caroline St-Hilaire	Bloc Québécois	Longueuil—Pierre-Boucher	1997	4th term
Jacques Gourde ‡	Conservative	Lotbinière—Chutes-de-la-Chaudière	2006	1st term
Luc Harvey	Conservative	Louis-Hébert	2006	1st term
**Josée Verner**	Conservative	Louis-Saint-Laurent	2006	1st term
Gérard Asselin	Bloc Québécois	Manicouagan	1993	5th term
Serge Ménard	Bloc Québécois	Marc-Aurèle-Fortin	2004	2nd term
Christian Paradis ‡	Conservative	Mégantic—L'Érable	2006	1st term
Roger Gaudet	Bloc Québécois	Montcalm	2002	3rd term
Paul Crête	Bloc Québécois	Montmagny—L'Islet—Kamouraska—Rivière-du-Loup	1993	5th term
Michel Guimond	Bloc Québécois	Montmorency—Charlevoix—Haute-Côte-Nord	1993	5th term
Irwin Cotler	Liberal	Mount Royal	1999	4th term
Marlene Jennings	Liberal	Notre-Dame-de-Grâce—Lachine	1997	4th term
Jean Lapierre	Liberal	Outremont	1979, (Note: Shefford) 2004	6th term*
Thomas Mulcair (2007)	New Democratic	Outremont	2007	1st term
Vivian Barbot	Bloc Québécois	Papineau	2006	1st term
Bernard Patry	Liberal	Pierrefonds—Dollard	1993	5th term
**Lawrence Cannon**	Conservative	Pontiac	2006	1st term
André Arthur	Independent	Portneuf—Jacques-Cartier	2006	1st term
Christiane Gagnon	Bloc Québécois	Québec	1993	5th term
Benoît Sauvageau	Bloc Québécois	Repentigny	1993	5th term
Raymond Gravel (2006) (Note: Member since swearing-in date of by-election)	Bloc Québécois	Repentigny	2006	1st term
André Bellavance	Bloc Québécois	Richmond—Arthabaska	2004	2nd term
Louise Thibault	Bloc Québécois	Rimouski-Neigette—Témiscouata—Les Basques	2004	2nd term
Louise Thibault	Independent	Rimouski-Neigette—Témiscouata—Les Basques	2004	2nd term
Gilles Perron	Bloc Québécois	Rivière-des-Mille-Îles	1997	4th term
Monique Guay	Bloc Québécois	Rivière-du-Nord	1993	5th term
Michel Gauthier	Bloc Québécois	Roberval—Lac-Saint-Jean	1993	5th term
Denis Lebel (2007)	Conservative	Roberval—Lac-Saint-Jean	2007	1st term
Bernard Bigras	Bloc Québécois	Rosemont—La Petite-Patrie	1997	4th term
Carole Lavallée	Bloc Québécois	Saint-Bruno—Saint-Hubert	2004	2nd term
Yvan Loubier	Bloc Québécois	Saint-Hyacinthe—Bagot	1993	5th term
Ève-Mary Thaï Thi Lac (2007)	Bloc Québécois	Saint-Hyacinthe—Bagot	2007	1st term
Claude Bachand	Bloc Québécois	Saint-Jean	1993	5th term
Maka Kotto	Bloc Québécois	Saint-Lambert	2004	2nd term
Vacant		Saint-Lambert	2004	2nd term
Stéphane Dion (Note: Leader since December 2, 2006)	Liberal	Saint-Laurent—Cartierville	1996	5th term
Massimo Pacetti	Liberal	Saint-Léonard—Saint-Michel	2002	3rd term
Jean-Yves Laforest	Bloc Québécois	Saint-Maurice—Champlain	2006	1st term
Robert Vincent	Bloc Québécois	Shefford	2004	2nd term
Serge Cardin	Bloc Québécois	Sherbrooke	1998	4th term
Diane Bourgeois	Bloc Québécois	Terrebonne—Blainville	2000	3rd term
Paule Brunelle	Bloc Québécois	Trois-Rivières	2004	2nd term
Meili Faille	Bloc Québécois	Vaudreuil—Soulanges	2004	2nd term
Luc Malo	Bloc Québécois	Verchères—Les Patriotes	2006	1st term
Lucienne Robillard	Liberal	Westmount—Ville-Marie	1995	5th term
Vacant		Westmount—Ville-Marie	1995	5th term

=== Saskatchewan ===
Name	Party	Electoral district	First elected / previously elected	No. of terms
**Gerry Ritz**	Conservative	Battlefords—Lloydminster	1997	4th term
Lynne Yelich ‡	Conservative	Blackstrap	2000	3rd term
David L. Anderson ‡	Conservative	Cypress Hills—Grasslands	2000	3rd term
Gary Merasty	Liberal	Desnethé—Missinippi—Churchill River	2006	1st term
Rob Clarke (2008)	Conservative	Desnethé—Missinippi—Churchill River	2008	1st term
Dave Batters	Conservative	Palliser	2004	2nd term
Brian Fitzpatrick	Conservative	Prince Albert	2000	3rd term
Tom Lukiwski ‡	Conservative	Regina—Lumsden—Lake Centre	2004	2nd term
Andrew Scheer	Conservative	Regina—Qu'Appelle	2004	2nd term
Brad Trost	Conservative	Saskatoon—Humboldt	2004	2nd term
**Carol Skelton**	Conservative	Saskatoon—Rosetown—Biggar	2000	3rd term
Maurice Vellacott	Conservative	Saskatoon—Wanuskewin	1997	4th term
Ed Komarnicki ‡	Conservative	Souris—Moose Mountain	2004	2nd term
Ralph Goodale	Liberal	Wascana	1974, (Note: Assiniboia) 1993	6th term*
Garry Breitkreuz	Conservative	Yorkton—Melville	1993	5th term

=== Territories ===
Name	Party	Electoral district	First elected / previously elected	No. of terms
Nancy Karetak-Lindell	Liberal	Nunavut	1997	4th term
Dennis Bevington	New Democratic	Western Arctic	2006	1st term
Larry Bagnell	Liberal	Yukon	2000	3rd term

== Changes since election ==
Changes to party standings during the 39th Parliament of Canada

January 23, 2006 to July 2, 2007
Affiliation	2006						2007								
Affiliation	Jan 23	Feb 6	Aug 28	Sep 20	Oct 18	Nov 27	Jan 5	Jan 28	Feb 6	Feb 21	Mar 21	Apr 12	Jun 5	Jun 26	Jul 2
Conservative	124	125			124		125						124	125	
Liberal	103	102		101		102	101	100	101		100				99
Bloc Québécois	51		50			51				50		49			
New Democratic	29														
Independent	1				2				1		2	3	4	3	
Total members	308		307	306		308		307		306					305
vacant	0		1	2		0		1		2					3
Government Majority	-60	-58	-57	-56	-58	-60	-58	-57		-56			-58	-56	-55

July 12, 2007 to August 30, 2008
Affiliation	2007									2008					
Affiliation	Jul 12	Jul 27	Jul 29	Aug 31	Sep 17	Oct 28	Nov 23	Jan 25	Jan 29	Feb 4	Mar 13	Mar 17	Apr 7	Aug 1	Aug 30
Conservative	125				126		125			126		127			
Liberal	98	97		96		95		94				97	96	95	
Bloc Québécois	49		48		49						48				
New Democratic	29				30										
Independent	3						4		5	4					3
Green	0														1
Liberal without caucus	0					1			0						
Total members	304	303	302	301	304			303			302	306	305	304	
vacant	4	5	6	7	4			5			6	2	3	4	
Government Majority	-54	-53	-52	-51	-52		-53	-52		-51	-50	-52	-51	-50	

=== Changes in membership ===
Date	Name	Riding	Affiliation	Details
January 23, 2006	See List of Members			Election day of the 39th Canadian federal election
February 6, 2006	David Emerson	Vancouver Kingsway	Conservative	Appointed to cabinet, crossed the floor from the Liberals
August 28, 2006	Benoît Sauvageau	Repentigny	Bloc Québécois	Died in a car accident
September 20, 2006	Joe Fontana	London North Centre	Liberal	Vacated seat to run for Mayor of London, Ontario
October 18, 2006	Garth Turner	Halton	Independent	Removed from the Conservative caucus on after being accused of breaking caucus confidentiality.
November 27, 2006	Raymond Gravel	Repentigny	Bloc Québécois	Elected in a by-election
November 27, 2006	Glen Pearson	London North Centre	Liberal	Elected in a by-election
January 5, 2007	Wajid Khan	Mississauga—Streetsville	Conservative	Crossed the floor from the Liberals
January 28, 2007	Jean Lapierre	Outremont	Liberal	Vacated seat to pursue television career
February 6, 2007	Garth Turner	Halton	Liberal	Joined the Liberal caucus
February 21, 2007	Yvan Loubier	Saint-Hyacinthe—Bagot	Bloc Québécois	Vacated seat to run in the 2007 Quebec general election
March 21, 2007	Joe Comuzzi	Thunder Bay—Superior North	Independent	Removed from the Liberal caucus on due to his intention to vote for the 2007 budget.
April 12, 2007	Louise Thibault	Rimouski-Neigette—Témiscouata—Les Basques	Independent	Left the Bloc Québécois caucus
June 5, 2007	Bill Casey	Cumberland—Colchester—Musquodoboit Valley	Independent	Expelled from the Conservative caucus for voting against his party's budget.
June 26, 2007	Joe Comuzzi	Thunder Bay—Superior North	Conservative	Joined the Conservative caucus.
July 2, 2007	Bill Graham	Toronto Centre	Liberal	Vacated seat
July 12, 2007	Jim Peterson	Willowdale	Liberal	Vacated seat
July 27, 2007	Stephen Owen	Vancouver Quadra	Liberal	Vacated seat
July 29, 2007	Michel Gauthier	Roberval—Lac-Saint-Jean	Bloc Québécois	Vacated seat
August 31, 2007	Gary Merasty	Desnethé—Missinippi—Churchill River	Liberal	Vacated seat
September 17, 2007	Denis Lebel	Roberval—Lac-Saint-Jean	Conservative	Elected in a by-election
September 17, 2007	Thomas Mulcair	Outremont	New Democratic	Elected in a by-election
September 17, 2007	Ève-Mary Thaï Thi Lac	Saint-Hyacinthe—Bagot	Bloc Québécois	Elected in a by-election
October 28, 2007	Blair Wilson	West Vancouver—Sunshine Coast—Sea to Sky Country	Liberal without caucus	Removed from the Liberal caucus, still identified as a Liberal
November 23, 2007	Wajid Khan	Mississauga—Streetsville	Independent	Left the Conservative caucus to sit as an independent
January 25, 2008	Lucienne Robillard	Westmount—Ville-Marie	Liberal	Vacated seat
January 29, 2008	Blair Wilson	West Vancouver—Sunshine Coast—Sea to Sky Country	Independent	Officially became an Independent
February 4, 2008	Wajid Khan	Mississauga—Streetsville	Conservative	Returned to the Conservative caucus.
March 13, 2008	Maka Kotto	Saint-Lambert	Bloc Québécois	Vacated seat to run in a provincial by-election
March 17, 2008	Rob Clarke	Desnethé—Missinippi—Churchill River	Conservative	Elected in a by-election
March 17, 2008	Joyce Murray	Vancouver Quadra	Liberal	Elected in a by-election
March 17, 2008	Martha Hall Findlay	Willowdale	Liberal	Elected in a by-election
March 17, 2008	Bob Rae	Toronto Centre	Liberal	Elected in a by-election
April 7, 2008	Brenda Chamberlain	Guelph	Liberal	Vacated seat
August 1, 2008	John Godfrey	Don Valley West	Liberal	Vacated seat
August 30, 2008	Blair Wilson	West Vancouver—Sunshine Coast—Sea to Sky Country	Green	Founded Green caucus.

== See also ==
- List of senators in the 39th Parliament of Canada
- Women in the 39th Canadian Parliament
