= Timeline of the 2008 Canadian federal election =

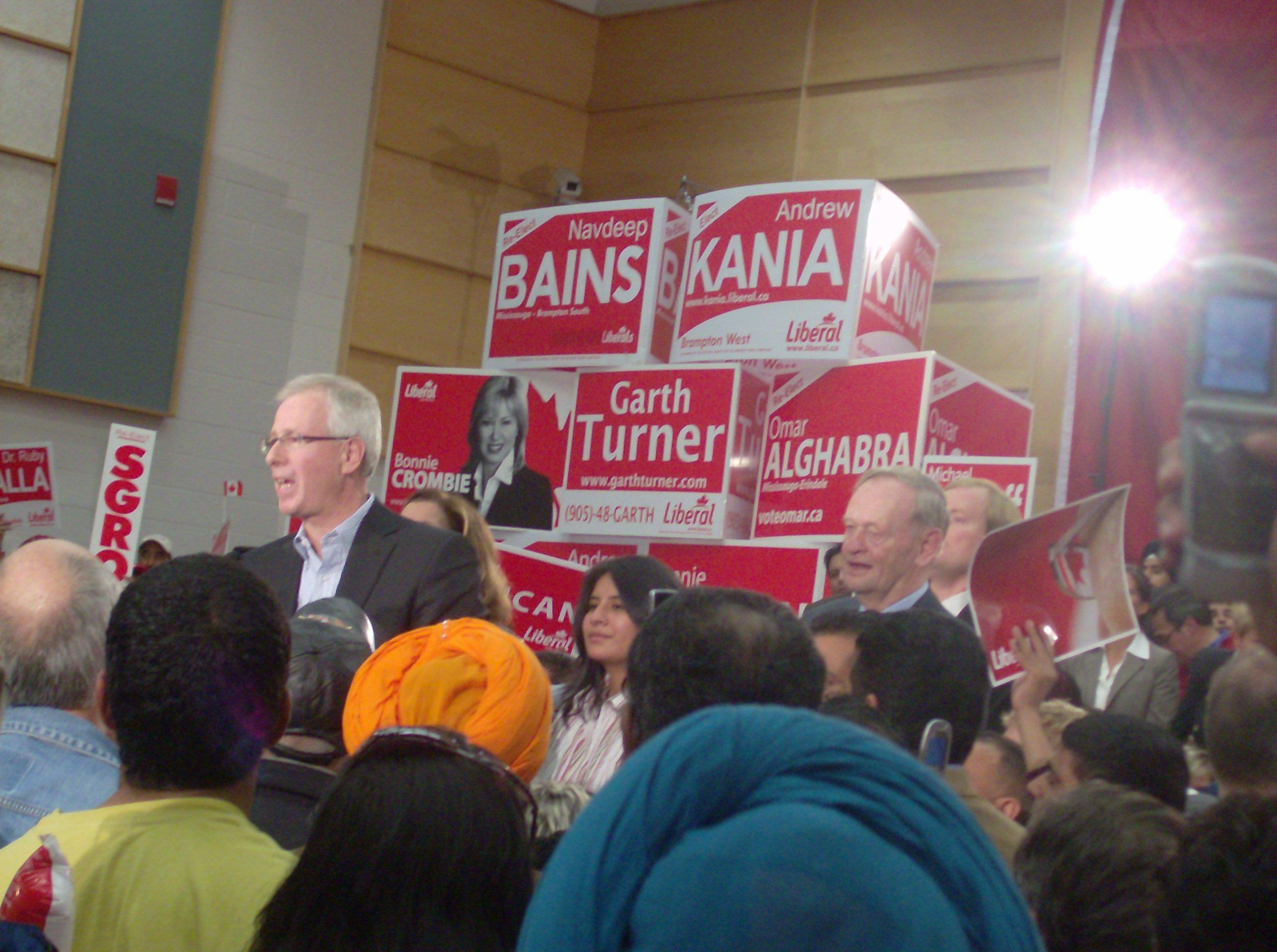
Dion makes a speech on October 10, 2008 in Brampton West. Former Prime Minister Jean Chrétien, Sheila Copps, Gerard Kennedy, and Michael Ignatieff were among notable Liberals at this rally.

The 2008 Canadian federal election (more formally, the 40th Canadian General Election) was held on Tuesday, October 14, 2008 to elect members to the House of Commons of Canada of the 40th Canadian Parliament after the previous parliament had been dissolved by the Governor General on September 7, 2008. The election yielded a minority government under the Conservative Party of Canada, led by incumbent Prime Minister Stephen Harper.

The election call resulted in the cancellation of four federal by-elections that had been scheduled to occur in September.

== Timeline ==
- February 6, 2006: Harper Cabinet is sworn in. Liberal David Emerson crosses the floor to join the new government, thus changing the standings in the Canadian House of Commons to Conservatives 125, Liberals 102, BQ 51, NDP 29, Independent 1. This has the potential to be very relevant in terms of numbers, as it allows a Conservative-NDP voting bloc to command a majority.
- February 19, 2006: Bloc Québécois House Leader Michel Gauthier announces that his party will vote to keep the government in office for a "good while". So long as the Bloc votes with the government on confidence measures, they will pass.
- March 19, 2006: Former Prime Minister Paul Martin resigns as Liberal Party leader. Bill Graham is named interim leader.
- April 3, 2006: Peter Milliken is re-elected Speaker of the House of Commons of Canada becoming only the third Opposition MP to serve as Speaker. The Speaker only votes in the event of a tie and then must vote to support the status quo. The election of a Liberal Speaker effectively gives the Conservatives an additional cushion by denying the Liberals a vote. Numerically, the Conservatives can now pass legislation and win motions of confidence with the support of any one Opposition party, i.e., the Conservatives and the NDP combined have enough seats to win a vote, as they do combined with BQ or the Liberals (assuming all MPs are present and vote without any defections).
- August 28, 2006: Bloc Member of Parliament Benoît Sauvageau (Repentigny) dies in a car accident.
- September 20, 2006: Liberal MP for London North Centre Joe Fontana resigns to run for mayor of London, Ontario.
- October 18, 2006: Garth Turner, the Conservative MP for Halton, is suspended from the Conservative Party. He sits as an Independent.
- November 21, 2006: Minister of Public Works and Government Services and Senator Michael Fortierannounces he will run for the House of Commons in this election in the riding of Vaudreuil—Soulanges.
- November 27, 2006: By-elections in London North Centre and Repentigny result in holds for the Liberals and Bloc, respectively. The Green Party comes second in London North Centre.
- December 2, 2006: Stéphane Dion wins the Liberal Party leadership at the Liberal Party leadership convention.
- December 12, 2006: The Bloc threatens to introduce a non-confidence motion over Canada's role in the invasion of Afghanistan in the new year
- December 14, 2006: Liberal leader Stéphane Dion says that the Liberals are "preparing" for a spring election.
- December 19, 2006: Liberal leader Stéphane Dion appoints Scott Brison and Bob Rae as co-chairs of his party's election platform committee and Gerard Kennedy as advisor for election readiness and renewal.
- January 5, 2007: Liberal MP Wajid Khan crosses the floor to join the Conservatives to retain his position as special advisor to the Prime Minister for the Middle East and Afghanistan.
- January 11, 2007: Liberal MP Jean Lapierre announces that he will resign his seat of Outremont before the end of the month, which he does on January 28, 2007.
- February 6, 2007: Independent MP Garth Turner joins the Liberal Party.
- February 14, 2007: The House of Commons passes third reading on a Private Member's Bill by Liberal MP Pablo Rodríguez committing the Government to meet Canada's Kyoto Protocol commitments by 2012.
- February 21, 2007: Bloc Québécois MP Yvan Loubier resigns his seat of Saint-Hyacinthe—Bagot to run in the Quebec Provincial Election.
- March 21, 2007: Liberal MP Joe Comuzzi is expelled from the caucus for supporting the Conservative Budget.
- April 12, 2007: Bloc Québécois MP Louise Thibault leaves the Bloc Québécois to sit as an Independent, citing dissatisfaction with Bloc leader Gilles Duceppe as her reason for leaving.
- April 12, 2007: Liberal and Green Party leaders Stéphane Dion and Elizabeth May agree to not run candidates against each other in the upcoming election. The Liberals will not run a candidate in Central Nova and the Greens will not run a candidate in Saint-Laurent—Cartierville.
- May 3, 2007: Bill C-16 receives Royal Assent. This bill states that the next election must be held on October 19, 2009, unless there is an earlier dissolution.
- June 5, 2007: Bill Casey, the longest-serving member within the Conservative caucus, is expelled for voting against the budget. He now sits as an independent member.
- June 26, 2007: Independent MP Joe Comuzzi joins the Conservative Party.
- July 2, 2007: Liberal MP Bill Graham resigns his seat of Toronto Centre
- July 12, 2007: Liberal MP Jim Peterson resigns his seat, as he previously announced in June.
- July 27, 2007: Liberal MP Stephen Owen resigns his seat to accept an academic position.
- July 28, 2007: By-elections are called to be held in the vacant seats of Outremont and Saint-Hyacinthe—Bagot on September 17.
- July 29, 2007: Bloc Québécois MP Michel Gauthier resigns his seat.
- August 11, 2007: By-election is called to be held in the vacant seat of Roberval—Lac-Saint-Jean on September 17.
- August 16, 2007: The new political party Neorhino.ca is officially recognized by Elections Canada.
- August 31, 2007: First-term Liberal MP Gary Merasty resigns his seat.
- September 17, 2007: By-elections are held in three ridings; the Conservatives, Bloc, and NDP each win one. The NDP's Thomas Mulcair becomes only the second MP for that party ever elected in Quebec.
- October 28, 2007: Liberal MP Blair Wilson resigns from the national caucus. He will sit as an independent, styling himself a "non-caucus Liberal".
- November 23, 2007: Conservative MP Wajid Khan resigns from the national caucus. He will sit as an Independent MP.
- December 2, 2007: Liberal leader Dion announces he will be seeking a spring 2008 election, possibly before the budget.
- January 25, 2008: Liberal MP Lucienne Robillard resigns her seat of Westmount—Ville-Marie (Quebec).
- February 2, 2008: Wajid Khan readmitted into Conservative Caucus.
- March 13, 2008: Bloc Québécois MP Maka Kotto resigns his seat of Saint-Lambert (Quebec).
- March 17, 2008: Four by-elections held. Liberals retain three seats, but lost one to the Conservatives.
- April 7, 2008: Liberal MP Brenda Chamberlain resigns her seat of Guelph (Ontario).
- May 25, 2008: Canadian Foreign Affairs Minister Maxime Bernier resigned Sunday (May 25) over an alleged security breach. Trade Minister David Emerson is appointed to assume Bernier’s duties.
- June 25, 2008: Prime Minister Harper shuffles his cabinet. David Emerson becomes Minister of Foreign Affairs; Michael Fortier becomes Minister of International Trade; Christian Paradis becomes Minister of Public Works and Government Services (while keeping his title as Secretary of State (Agriculture)); and James Moore becomes Secretary of State (Asia–Pacific Gateway) (2010 Winter Olympics) (Official Languages).
- July 25, 2008: The writs of by-election is issued by Elections Canada for the federal by-elections to be held on September 8, 2008 in the ridings of Guelph (Ontario), Saint-Lambert (Quebec) and Westmount—Ville-Marie (Quebec).
- August 1, 2008: Liberal MP John Godfrey resigns his seat of Don Valley West.
- August 17, 2008: The writ of by-election is issued by Elections Canada for the federal by-election to be held on September 22, 2008, in the riding of Don Valley West (Ontario).
- August 26, 2008: Harper indicates he may call an election for the fall of 2008; Parliament could be dissolved as early as the week of September 1-September 6.
- August 29, 2008: Harper meets with Gilles Duceppe, the leader of the Bloc Québécois in an attempt to find common ground between the Bloc and the Conservatives.
- August 30, 2008: Former Liberal MP Blair Wilson joins the Green Party after being an Independent for nearly a year in the riding of West Vancouver—Sunshine Coast—Sea to Sky Country in British Columbia. Wilson becomes the first Member of Parliament for the Green Party.
- August 30, 2008: Harper meets with Jack Layton, the leader of the New Democrats in an attempt to find common ground between the NDP and the Conservatives.
- September 1, 2008: Harper meets with Stéphane Dion, the leader of the Liberals, in an attempt to find common ground between the Liberals and the Conservatives, and avert the dissolution of Parliament, allowing the fall session to continue as planned. However, after a twenty-minute meeting at 24 Sussex Drive, the PM's official residence, Dion emerges stating there is no common ground between the two parties, and that an election is certain.
- September 4, 2008: Green Party announces that they support the candidacy of Independent MP Bill Casey and will not be running a candidate in Cumberland—Colchester—Musquodoboit Valley.
- September 5, 2008: The Prime Minister's Office (PMO) announces that Prime Minister Harper will visit the Governor General at 9 am on September 7, 2008 to ask for the dissolution of the 39th Parliament and a general election on October 14, 2008.
- September 7, 2008: At 8:20 am Eastern Daylight Time, Prime Minister Stephen Harper leaves his official residence at 24 Sussex Drive and takes a short drive to Rideau Hall, the Governor General's official residence. There, he asks the Governor General, Michaëlle Jean, to call a general election on October 14, 2008. She accepts the request.
- October 14, 2008: Elections are held for members of the House of Commons in the 40th Canadian Parliament.
- November 4, 2008: Writs are returned to the Chief Electoral Officer.
- November 10, 2008: The 40th Parliament is summoned.
- December 1, 2008: The Liberals and NDP sign an agreement on proposed coalition government to replace the governing Conservatives under Prime Minister Harper.
- December 1, 2008: The Liberals, NDP, and Bloc Québécois sign a "policy accord", whereby the Bloc would support a Liberal/NDP government for at least 18 months.
- December 4, 2008: Parliament is prorogued by the Governor General during the parliamentary dispute on advice of the Prime Minister.
- January 26, 2009: Parliament is to reconvene for second session.
