= 2022 Athabasca provincial by-election =

- February 15, 2022

District of Athabasca
- Turnout: 24.42% (▼9.21pp)
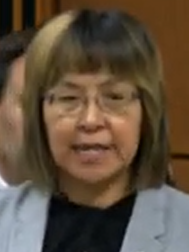
	First party	Second party	Third party
	SP		Ind.
Candidate	Jim Lemaigre	Georgina Jolibois	Darwin Roy
Party	Saskatchewan	New Democratic	Independent
Popular vote	1,163	916	157
Percentage	51.3%	40.4%	6.9%
Swing	▲14.79 pp	▼16.40 pp	-
- A map of Saskatchewan's provincial ridings, showing Athabasca highlighted in red.
MLA before election
Buckley Belanger
New Democratic
Elected MLA
Jim Lemaigre
Saskatchewan

A by-election was held in the provincial district of Athabasca in Saskatchewan on February 15, 2022, following the resignation of incumbent New Democrat MLA Buckley Belanger. After 16 years in Parliament, Belanger resigned from the legislature on August 15, 2021, to run in the 2021 Canadian federal election, as a federal Liberal in the riding of Desnethé—Missinippi—Churchill River. He was defeated.

The seat was vacant for six months between Belanger's resignation and the by-election. The seat, which was first contested in 1908, had been held by either the Liberals or New Democrats for the entirety of its history. Along with the neighbouring northern riding of Cumberland, the riding has been considered one of the safest New Democratic seats in Saskatchewan, although candidates for the centre-right Saskatchewan Party have polled somewhat better results in the 21st century compared to Saskatchewan Party and Progressive Conservative candidates in previous elections.

In a major upset, the Saskatchewan Party's Jim Lemaigre, defeated NDP candidate, and former federal MP for much of the district, Georgina Jolibois. The NDP had held the predominantly-indigenous riding almost continuously since 1975, and a conservative candidate had not come within ten percentage points of victory since 1964. The result also came in spite of polling in the month before showing the NDP closer to the Saskatchewan Party in province-wide support than any point in the previous five years.

Three days after the election, leader of the Saskatchewan New Democratic Party Ryan Meili announced his intention to resign as leader and trigger a leadership election.

== Reaction ==
In the immediate aftermath of the results, Saskatchewan premier and Saskatchewan Party leader Scott Moe called the results "very significant", noting that the Saskatchewan Party government had "always had MLAs representing every part of the province, except for the far north. That changed tonight. Saskatchewan Party MLAs now represent every part of [Saskatchewan]."

Winning candidate Jim Lemaigre stated that he believed a desire for a voice in government had been key to the results, stating that "one elder put it quite nicely, he said 'We've been on the outside of government for so long, why wouldn't we put ourselves back there with this opportunity.' ".

The results also had a significant impact on the provincial NDP, with provincial leader Ryan Meili announcing his resignation as NDP leader three days after the election. Meili said the result was not the reason for his decision, but said that it was "clarifying", and conceded that losing the seat was "really disappointing."

Ken Coates, a Professor of Public Policy at the University of Saskatchewan, expressed surprise at the results, arguing that the Saskatchewan Party “has not been very supportive of northern issues for quite some time” and hasn't consistently reached out to Indigenous people. He argued that the results demonstrated "the really serious failure of the NDP to understand the province of Saskatchewan outside Regina and Saskatoon." Coates argued that the results were primarily driven by local issues, stating that he did not think "either of the leaders played a critical role in this at all" but that the NDP "really does not have a terribly good handle on Indigenous or rural issues".

== Results ==
Saskatchewan provincial by-election, 15 February 2022: Athabasca Resignation of Buckley Belanger
Party	Candidate	Votes	%	±%
Saskatchewan	Jim Lemaigre	1,163	51.3	+14.79%
New Democratic	Georgina Jolibois	916	40.4	-16.40%
Independent	Darwin Roy	157	6.9	-
Buffalo	Clint Arnason	12	0.5	-
Total valid votes		2,248	99.1	
Total rejected ballots		17	0.8	-0.05
Turnout		2,265	24.42	-9.21
Eligible voters		9,277		
Saskatchewan gain from New Democratic		Swing		+15.6
Source: Elections Saskatchewan

== 2020 result ==
2020 Saskatchewan general election: Athabasca
Party	Candidate	Votes	%	±%
New Democratic	Buckley Belanger	1,730	56.80	-7.88
Saskatchewan	Kelly Kwan	1,112	36.51	+12.79
Green	Leroy Laliberte	204	6.70	+4.75
Total valid votes		3,046	99.14	
Total rejected ballots		26	0.85	+0.44
Turnout		3,072	33.63	+0.22
Eligible voters		9,136		
New Democratic hold		Swing		-10.33
Source: Elections Saskatchewan

== Results by Community ==
Poll Numbers	Community	Lemaigre	Jolibois	Roy	Arnason	Rejected	Vote Total
1	Uranium City	5	12	3	1	0	21
2	Fond du Lac	7	29	1	0	0	37
3	Stony Rapids	4	24	0	0	0	28
4	Black Lake	21	54	0	1	9	85
5, 7-10, Advance 004	La Loche	443	211	9	2	3	668
6	Clearwater River	66	23	0	0	2	91
11	Birch Narrows	23	22	1	0	3	49
12, Advance 006	Pinehouse	314	44	8	3	0	369
13	Patuanak	6	35	1	0	0	42
14-15, Advance 005	Île-à-la-Crosse	32	165	52	1	0	250
16, Advance 001	Beauval	24	52	46	0	0	122
17	Canoe Lake	12	56	18	1	0	87
18-20, Advance 002	Buffalo Narrows	122	76	7	1	0	206
21 A/B	Dillon	47	42	1	0	0	90
21 C	Michel Village	6	3	0	0	0	9
22	Cole Bay	1	14	4	0	0	19
23, Advance 003	Green Lake	9	33	6	2	0	50
24	Dore Lake	3	5	0	0	0	8
Vote by Mail		18	16	0	0	0	34
TOTAL		1,163	916	157	12	17	2,265
