= Georgina Jolibois =

Canadian politician (born 1968)

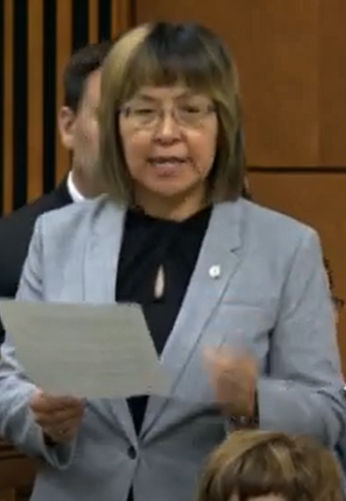

Member of Parliament for Desnethé—Missinippi—Churchill River
- In office October 19, 2015 – October 21, 2019
- Preceded by: Rob Clarke
- Succeeded by: Gary Vidal

Mayor of La Loche
- In office 2003–2015

Personal details
- Born: 1968 (age 57–58) La Loche, Saskatchewan, Canada
- Party: New Democratic Party

Georgina Jolibois (born 1968) is a Canadian politician who was elected in the 2015 Canadian federal election to represent the riding of Desnethé—Missinippi—Churchill River during the 42nd Canadian Parliament. Jolibois sought re-election in the 2019 election but was defeated by her Conservative challenger Gary Vidal.

Prior to her election, Jolibois served for twelve years as mayor of La Loche, Saskatchewan. She also served ten years on the Royal Canadian Mounted Police "F" Division Aboriginal Advisory Committee.

Jolibois sponsored the private member's Bill C-369, which sought to make National Indigenous Peoples Day a legal holiday. While the bill was not adopted, a similar bill was adopted in the subsequent parliament, making September 30 a legal holiday called National Day for Truth and Reconciliation.

In late 2021, Jolibois was named the Saskatchewan New Democratic Party's candidate for the Athabasca by-election to replace Buckley Belanger, which occurred on February 15, 2022. In an upset, she was defeated by the Saskatchewan Party's candidate Jim Lemaigre.

== Personal information ==
Georgina Jolibois was born and raised in La Loche, Saskatchewan, near the Clearwater River Dene First Nation. She has a degree from the University of Saskatchewan. Before being elected into Parliament, Jolibois was the mayor of La Loche from 2003 to 2015, and she is also a member of the Saskatchewan Association of Northern Communities. In 2015, she was elected as the Member of Parliament for Desnethé—Missinippi—Churchill River.

== 2015 Canadian federal election ==
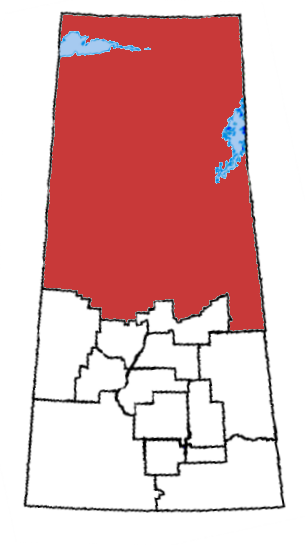
Desnethé–Missinippi–Churchill River Map

In 2015, Jolibois expressed her desire to run as a candidate for the New Democratic Party in the upcoming 2015 Canadian Federal Elections for the Desnethe-Missinippi-Churchill River area. This riding covers half of Saskatchewan's northern area and includes many small communities as well as First Nation reserves and fly-in-posts.

Jolibois won her riding by only 82 votes over the Liberal candidate, Lawrence Joseph, and defeated incumbent Rob Clarke. After a recount, it was found that Jolibois won by 82 votes over Joseph, not the previously recorded results of 71 votes.

== Electoral record ==
2019 Canadian federal election: Desnethé—Missinippi—Churchill River
Party	Candidate	Votes	%	±%	Expenditures
Conservative	Gary Vidal	11,531	42.30	+12.17	$64,212.77
New Democratic	Georgina Jolibois	7,741	28.40	−5.75	$89,787.05
Liberal	Tammy Cook-Searson	7,225	26.51	−7.38	$63,291.05
Green	Sarah Kraynick	543	1.99	+0.17	$1,816.39
People's	Jerome Perrault	217	0.80	–	$2,050.00
Total valid votes/expense limit		27,257	99.21		
Total rejected ballots		216	0.79	+0.49	
Turnout		27,473	57.25	−7.47	
Eligible voters		47,985			
Conservative gain from New Democratic		Swing		+8.96	
Source: Elections Canada

2015 Canadian federal election: Desnethé—Missinippi—Churchill River
Party	Candidate	Votes	%	±%	Expenditures
New Democratic	Georgina Jolibois	10,319	34.15	-11.23	$26,597.41
Liberal	Lawrence Joseph	10,237	33.88	+28.62	$50,341.46
Conservative	Rob Clarke	9,105	30.14	-16.75	$83,236.17
Green	Warren Koch	552	1.83	-0.64	$1,984.03
Total valid votes/expense limit		30,213	99.70		$228,699.20
Total rejected ballots		91	0.30	–	
Turnout		30,304	64.72	–	
Eligible voters		46,824			
New Democratic gain from Conservative		Swing		+2.76	
These results were subject to a judicial recount and modified from the validated results in accordance with the Judge's rulings. The margin of Georgina Jolibois over Lawrence Joseph increased from 71 votes to 82 votes as a result of the recount.
Source: Elections Canada
