= By-elections to the 39th Canadian Parliament =

2006–2008 elections for vacant seats

- 2006–2008
- Results by riding. Different shading indicated party strength in the riding.

By-elections to the 39th Canadian Parliament were held to fill vacancies in the House of Commons of Canada between the 2006 federal election and the 2008 federal election. The Conservative Party of Canada led a minority government for the entirety of the 39th Canadian Parliament, although their seat total increased as a result of by-election results.

Twelve vacancies occurred during the life of the Parliament. Nine of these were filled by by-elections and the remaining three were filled at the 2008 federal election.

== Summary ==
Analysis of byelections by turnout and vote share for winning candidate (vs 2006)
Riding and winning party			Turnout		Vote share for winning candidate	
Riding and winning party			%	Change (pp)	%	Change (pp)
London North Centre	█ Liberal	Hold	42.15	-23.99	34.85	-5.27
Repentigny	█ Bloc Québécois	Hold	37.06	-30.39	66.26	3.84
Outremont	█ New Democratic	Gain	37.43	-23.35	47.60	30.40
Roberval—Lac-Saint-Jean	█ Conservative	Gain	46.83	-15.32	59.68	22.50
Saint-Hyacinthe—Bagot	█ Bloc Québécois	Hold	42.09	-24.30	42.72	-13.30
Desnethé—Missinippi—Churchill River	█ Conservative	Gain	24.72	-33.71	47.82	6.73
Toronto Centre	█ Liberal	Hold	27.86	-38.67	59.46	7.23
Vancouver Quadra	█ Liberal	Hold	33.78	-33.78	36.05	-12.79
Willowdale	█ Liberal	Hold	24.54	-38.23	59.38	4.15

== Overview ==
By-election	Date	Incumbent	Party	Winner	Party	Cause	Retained
Toronto Centre	March 17, 2008	Bill Graham	Liberal	Bob Rae	Liberal	Resigned	Yes
Willowdale	March 17, 2008	Jim Peterson	Liberal	Martha Hall Findlay	Liberal	Resigned	Yes
Vancouver Quadra	March 17, 2008	Stephen Owen	Liberal	Joyce Murray	Liberal	Resigned	Yes
Desnethé—Missinippi— Churchill River	March 17, 2008	Gary Merasty	Liberal	Rob Clarke	Conservative	Resigned to enter private sector	No
Outremont	September 17, 2007	Jean Lapierre	Liberal	Thomas Mulcair	New Democratic	Resigned	No
Saint-Hyacinthe—Bagot	September 17, 2007	Yvan Loubier	Bloc Québécois	Ève-Mary Thaï Thi Lac	Bloc Québécois	Resigned to enter provincial politics	Yes
Roberval—Lac-Saint-Jean	September 17, 2007	Michel Gauthier	Bloc Québécois	Denis Lebel	Conservative	Resigned	No
London North Centre	November 27, 2006	Joe Fontana	Liberal	Glen Pearson	Liberal	Resigned to run for Mayor of London	Yes
Repentigny	November 27, 2006	Benoît Sauvageau	Bloc Québécois	Raymond Gravel	Bloc Québécois	Death (car accident)	Yes

== 2006 ==
Two federal by-elections were held in Canada on November 27, 2006, to fill vacancies in the House of Commons of Canada. Both seats were held by their incumbent parties.

=== London North Centre ===
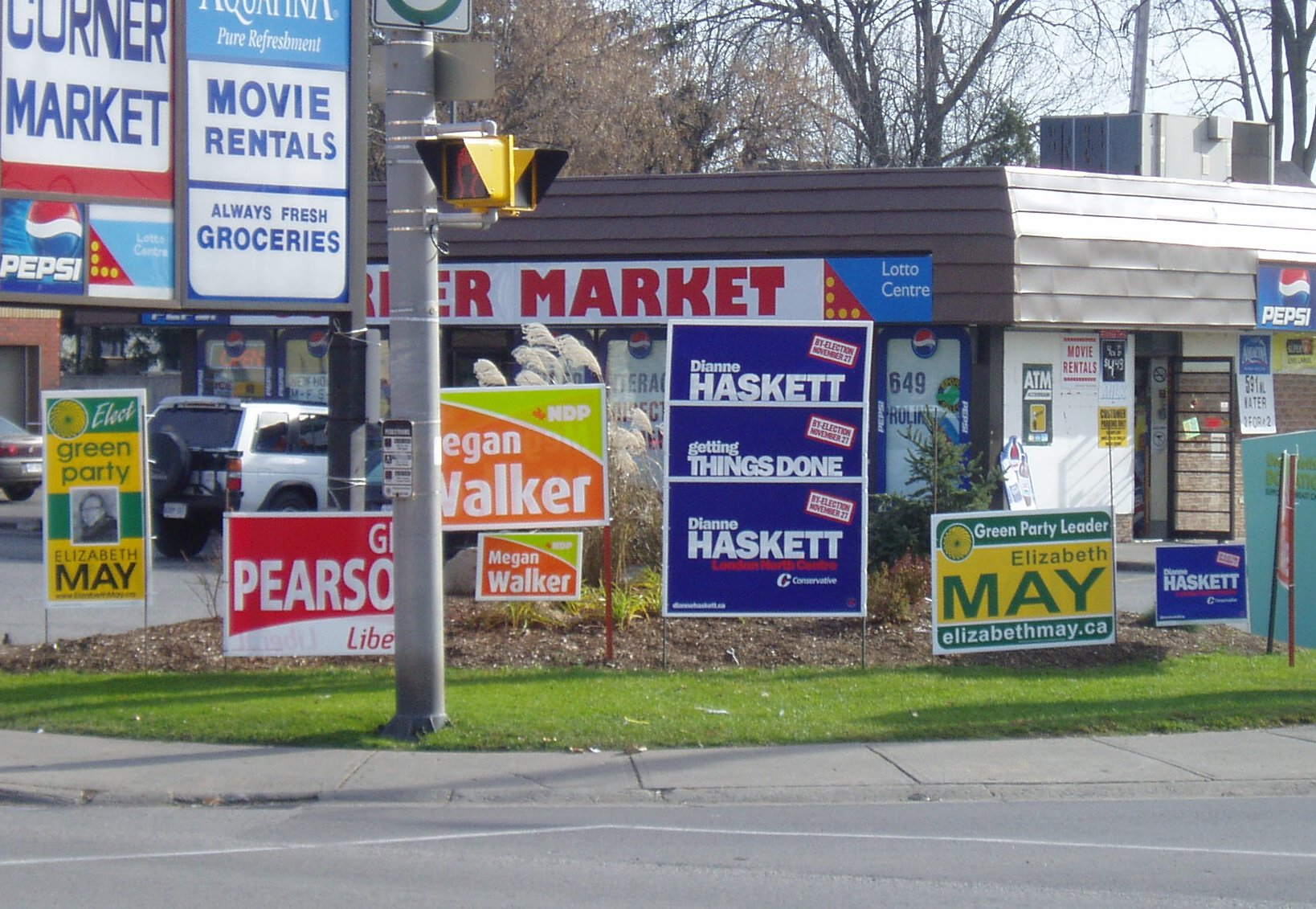
Lawn signs for all the major candidates decorate an intersection during the by-election

Long-time MP Joe Fontana resigned from the seat in 2006, in order to run in the London municipal election as a candidate for mayor, requiring a by-election to be held.

The election result presented a major breakthrough for the Green Party. Party leader Elizabeth May tripled the party's local result in the 2006 general election just ten months earlier, placing slightly ahead of former London mayor Dianne Haskett, the candidate of the governing Conservatives.

Canadian federal by-election, November 27, 2006: London North Centre Resignation of Joe Fontana
Party	Candidate	Votes	%	±%
Liberal	Glen Pearson	13,287	34.85	−5.27
Green	Elizabeth May	9,864	25.87	+20.38
Conservative	Dianne Haskett	9,309	24.42	−5.48
New Democratic	Megan Walker	5,388	14.13	−9.62
Progressive Canadian	Steven Hunter	145	0.38	−0.09
Independent	Robert Ede	77	0.20	–
Canadian Action	Will Arlow	53	0.14	–
Total		38,123	100.00	

=== Repentigny ===
MP Benoît Sauvageau was killed in a car accident on August 28, 2006.

There had been pressure from opposition parties for Public Works Minister Michael Fortier, a Conservative senator, to run here — however, he declined. Fortier was appointed to the Senate and the Cabinet to represent Greater Montreal, which elected no Conservatives in the last federal election. Fortier pledged to resign from the Senate and seek election to the House of Commons in the next federal election. Instead, the Conservative candidate was Stéphane Bourgon, a lawyer.

The Bloc Québécois, of which Sauvageau was a member, ran Raymond Gravel, a Roman Catholic priest. The New Democratic Party candidate was union activist and former Canadian navy member Réjean Bellemare, who had also run for the NDP in the previous general election.

The Green Party of Canada had announced that Marc-André Gadoury would be their candidate, but central office did not complete and send paperwork to Marc-André Gadoury, not to name leader signature, in sufficient time to get on the ballot. Gadoury suggested that the Greens did not submit the paperwork on purpose and on November 25, 2006, La Presse reported that Gadoury was endorsing the NDP candidate, Réjean Bellemare.

Raymond Gravel of the Bloc Québécois won the by-election with an approximately two-thirds majority of votes.

Canadian federal by-election, 27 November 2006
Party	Candidate	Votes	%	±%
Due to the death of Benoît Sauvageau, August 28, 2006
Bloc Québécois	Raymond Gravel	20,635	66.3%	+3.98
Conservative	Stéphane Bourgon	5,822	18.7%	+0.62
New Democratic	Réjean Bellemare	2,187	7.0%	-0.74
Liberal	Christian Turenne	1,940	6.2%	-2.45
Independent	Jocelyne Leduc	390	1.3%	n/a
Canadian Action	Mahmood Raza Baig	91	0.3%	n/a
Independent	Régent Millette	78	0.3%	n/a
Total		31,143	100.00%	

== 2007 ==
On September 17, 2007, three federal by-elections were held in the Canadian province of Quebec to fill vacancies in the House of Commons. Each of the three by-elections was won by a different political party.

The by-elections in Outremont and Saint-Hyacinthe—Bagot were originally announced by Prime Minister Stephen Harper on July 28, 2007. The third vacancy, in Roberval—Lac-Saint-Jean, occurred after the other two by-election campaigns were already underway, but Harper announced the by-election in that riding on August 11, scheduling it for the same date.

=== Outremont ===
The riding of Outremont was left vacant by the resignation of Liberal Party MP Jean Lapierre. The by-election resulted in a victory for the New Democratic Party on a substantial swing, whose candidate Thomas Mulcair became only the second New Democrat ever elected from Quebec and the first in seventeen years. The Saint-Hyacinthe—Bagot by-election and the Roberval—Lac-Saint-Jean by-election were held on the same day.

The by-election was triggered when Lapierre resigned from the House on January 28, to accept a position as a political analyst with Quebec television network TVA and Montreal radio station 98.5 FM. The Prime Minister of Canada has six months to call by-elections, and Prime Minister Stephen Harper called the by-election on the last possible day, July 28.

==== Candidates ====
Finally, Liberal leader Stéphane Dion appointed candidate Jocelyn Coulon on July 18. Prior to his current position as an international affairs expert, professor at the University of Montreal and director of the Francophone Research Network on the Operations of Peace (Reseau francophone de recherche sur les operations de paix), Coulon was a journalist for Le Devoir and a director of the Pearson Peacekeeping Centre's Montreal campus.

The Liberal announcement was not without controversy, and was condemned by Jewish lobby group B'nai Brith, even asking for the nomination to be revoked. The group cited Coulon's views on Israel, the United States and Hamas as being "out of step with current Liberal policy." The Quebec-Israel Committee stated that B'nai Brith's statements were exaggerated and that Coulon had every right to be the Liberal candidate. Though the riding is only 10 per cent Jewish, past Liberal candidates have traditionally relied heavily on the faithful support of this important voting block.

The Bloc Québécois, which came in second in the seat in 2006, selected Belgian-born, Lacanian psychoanalyst Jean-Paul Gilson as their candidate. Gilson immigrated to Canada in 1993.

The New Democratic Party, third place in 2006, selected Thomas Mulcair. Mulcair is a former Liberal Member of the National Assembly of Quebec. He served as Jean Charest's Minister of the Environment from 2003 to 2006, leaving cabinet amidst the controversy surrounding privatisation plans for Mont Orford provincial park. He was the MNA for Chomedey in Laval, Quebec from 1994 to 2007.

On April 20, Mulcair announced he was joining the New Democratic Party during a joint press conference with NDP Leader Jack Layton on Mont Royal. He currently serves as the NDP's Quebec spokesperson. Mulcair was nominated in an uncontested race on June 21 as the NDP candidate.

The Conservatives selected former Ambassador Gilles Duguay. Mr. Duguay is a former Rhodes scholar of Oxford University in Great Britain, former law professor at the National University in Kinshasa, author of much of Rwanda's constitution, former ambassador to Cameroon, Morocco, Romania, Bulgaria and Moldova, and former professor at McGill University and the University of Montreal.

The Green Party, fifth place in 2006, reselected their 2006 candidate, François Pilon, while the Canadian Action Party selected biochemistry student Alexandre Amirizian. The newly formed neorhino.ca, successor to the Rhinoceros Party of Canada, fielded party founder François Gourd on August 7. Gourd wished to finish last in the election.

Several Independent politicians also announced their candidacy, including Romain Angeles, who is running on a platform to abolish political parties; Mahmood Raza Baig, a former Canadian Action candidate in Repentigny and Papineau; Régent Millette, an independent in Outremont in 2006; John Turmel, record holder for most elections contested and for the most elections lost; and Jocelyne Leduc.

==== Results ====
By-election on September 17, 2007 Resignation of Jean Lapierre
Party	Candidate	Votes	%	±%
New Democratic	Thomas Mulcair	11,374	47.5	+30.4
Liberal	Jocelyn Coulon	6,933	29.0	–6.1
Bloc Québécois	Jean-Paul Gilson	2,618	10.9	–17.9
Conservative	Gilles Duguay	2,052	8.6	–4.2
Green	François Pilon	529	2.2	–2.6
neorhino.ca	François Yo Gourd	145	0.6	—
Independent	Mahmood Raza Baig	78	0.3	—
Independent	Jocelyne Leduc	61	0.3	—
Independent	Romain Angeles	46	0.2	—
Canadian Action	Alexandre Amirizian	45	0.2	—
Independent	Régent Millette	32	0.1	+0.0
Independent	John Turmel	30	0.1	—
Total		23,943	100.00	
New Democratic Party gain from Liberal		Swing	–18.3	

==== 2006 Results ====
2006 Canadian federal election
Party	Candidate	Votes	%	±%
Liberal	Jean Lapierre	14,282	35.2	-5.7
Bloc Québécois	Jacques Léonard	11,778	29.0	-4.3
New Democratic	Léo-Paul Lauzon	6,984	17.2	+3.1
Conservative	Daniel Fournier	5,168	12.7	+6.7
Green	François Pilon	1,957	4.8	+0.5
Independent	Eric Roach Denis	101	0.3	-
Progressive Canadian	Philip Paynter	94	0.2	–
Marxist–Leninist	Linda Sullivan	88	0.2	-0.1
Independent	Yan Lacombe	85	0.2	-
Independent	Xavier Rochon	34	0.1	-
Independent	Régent Millette	22	0.1	-
Total		40,593	100.00%	
Difference		2,504	6.2	
Rejected Ballots		282	0.7	
Turnout		40,875	60.8	
Liberal hold		Swing	-0.7	

=== Roberval—Lac-Saint-Jean ===
The electoral district of Roberval—Lac-Saint-Jean was left vacant by the resignation of Michel Gauthier (Bloc). Although Gauthier resigned after the other two by-elections had already been called, Prime Minister Stephen Harper announced the by-election on August 11 for the same date as the others.

Notably, Roberval—Lac-Saint-Jean was a district which the Tories had heavily targeted in the 2006 election but had narrowly lost. It was seen as the district most likely to be winnable for the party in the by-elections — and thus the by-election Harper was most eager to actually schedule.

==== Results ====
Roberval—Lac-Saint-Jean by-election, September 17, 2007
Party	Candidate	Votes	%	+/–
Conservative Party	Denis Lebel	17,463	59.7	+22.5
Bloc Québécois	Céline Houde	7,830	26.8	–18.4
Liberal Party	Louise Boulanger	2,795	9.6	+1.8
New Democratic Party	Éric Dubois	675	2.3	–3.2
Green	Jean-Luc Boily	499	1.7	–2.6
Total		29,262	100	
Conservative Party gain from Bloc Québécois				

==== 2006 Results ====
2006 Canadian federal election
Party	Candidate	Votes	%	±%
Bloc Québécois	Michel Gauthier	17,586	45.20%	-14.21%
Conservative	Ghislain Lavoie	14,463	37.18%	+28.52%
Liberal	Luc Chiasson	3,014	7.75%	-15.45%
New Democratic	François Privé	2,151	5.53%	+0.42%
Green	Sébastien Girard	1,689	4.34%	+0.72%
Total valid votes		38,903	100.00%	
Total rejected ballots		397	1.01	
Turnout		39,300	62.15	
Difference		3,123	8.03	
Bloc Québécois hold		Swing		-21.4

=== Saint-Hyacinthe—Bagot ===
The by-election in Saint-Hyacinthe—Bagot, resulting from the resignation of Yvan Loubier, was won by BQ candidate Ève-Mary Thaï Thi Lac, Loubier's former constituency assistant and the first Vietnamese Canadian ever elected to the House of Commons of Canada. However, Thi Lac's 1,478-vote margin of victory over Conservative candidate Bernard Barré was the narrowest victory for the BQ since the party first won the riding in the 1993 election. As in the other two ridings up for election, the Liberals were shut out; their candidate, Jean Caumartin, placed fourth, after the NDP's Brigitte Sansoucy.

==== Results ====
Saint-Hyacinthe—Bagot by-election, September 17, 2007
Party	Candidate	Votes	%	+/-
Bloc Québécois	Ève-Mary Thaï Thi Lac	13,443	42.1	-13.9%
Conservative Party	Bernard Barré	11,965	37.5	+12.7%
New Democratic Party	Brigitte Sansoucy	2,538	7.9	+2.4%
Liberal Party	Jean Caumartin	2,376	7.4	-2.4%
Green	Jacques Tétreault	1,169	3.7	-0.2%
neorhino.ca	Christian Willie Vanasse	384	1.2	–
Canadian Action	Michel St-Onge	61	0.2	
Total		31,936		
Bloc Québécois hold		Swing		{{{3}}}

==== 2006 Results ====
2006 Canadian federal election
Party	Candidate	Votes	%	±%
Bloc Québécois	Yvan Loubier	27,838	56.0%	-6.4%
Conservative	Huguette Guilhaumon	12,323	24.8%	+13.8%
Liberal	Stéphane Deschênes	4,884	9.8%	-12.2%
New Democratic	Joëlle Chevrier	2,723	5.5%	+3%
Green	Jacques Tétreault	1,925	3.9%	+1.9%
Total valid votes		49,693	100.00%	
Total rejected ballots		827	1.6	
Turnout		50,520	66.4	
Difference		15,515	31.2	
Bloc Québécois hold		Swing		-10.1

== 2008 ==
Four federal by-elections were held in Canada on March 17, 2008 to fill vacancies in the House of Commons of Canada.

The vacancies were caused by the resignations of Liberal MPs Gary Merasty (Desnethé—Missinippi—Churchill River), Bill Graham (Toronto Centre), Stephen Owen (Vancouver Quadra) and Jim Peterson (Willowdale).

A further three by-elections were scheduled for September 8 due to the resignations of Lucienne Robillard (Westmount—Ville-Marie), Brenda Chamberlain (Guelph) and Maka Kotto (Saint-Lambert), and an eighth by-election, resulting from the resignation of MP John Godfrey (Don Valley West), had been called for September 22, 2008. However, the four by-elections scheduled for September were pre-empted by the issuance on September 7 of election writs for the 2008 federal election.

=== March 17 by-elections ===
With all four by-elections taking place in ridings previously held by the Liberals, media generally treated them as a test of Stéphane Dion's leadership. Desnethé—Missinippi—Churchill River, a swing riding which the Liberals had won by a margin of just 68 votes in the 2006 election and in which the by-election campaign was mired in controversy around the process of appointing candidates, was seen as the only riding of the four that the Liberals could afford to lose — the other three were all safe Liberal ridings whose loss would have been seen as precipitating a major crisis for the party.

==== Desnethé—Missinippi—Churchill River ====
The riding of Desnethé—Missinippi—Churchill River became vacant on August 31, 2007 with the resignation of Liberal MP Gary Merasty.

David Orchard, a former member of the Progressive Conservative Party of Canada and backer of Stéphane Dion during the Liberal leadership contest, had announced that he would seek the Liberal nomination in Desnethé—Missinippi—Churchill River. However, on January 3, 2008, Dion used his power of appointment to appoint Joan Beatty as the Liberal candidate for that riding. While Dion had stated several times that he would use his power of appointment to ensure more female candidates, many felt the appointment was a snub to his erstwhile supporter and media reports suggested that Ralph Goodale, a prominent Saskatchewan MP, opposed Orchard's candidacy.

Beatty, who was a New Democratic Party MLA in the Saskatchewan legislature until her federal candidacy was announced, also faced some criticism, both for her switch in party affiliations and for resigning to run federally just seven weeks after being reelected in the 2007 provincial election. Some Liberal Party members in the riding threatened to boycott the by-election entirely, or to vote for another party, if Dion did not rescind the appointment and allow a normal nomination contest to take place.

Voter turnout: 10,462 of 41,841 registered electors (25.0%)

By-election on March 17, 2008
Party	Candidate	Votes	%	±%
Conservative	Rob Clarke	4,992	47.66%	+6.57%
Liberal	Joan Beatty	3,296	31.47%	-9.90%
New Democratic	Brian Morin	1,830	17.47%	+2.10%
Green	Robin Orr	320	3.05%	+0.89%
Total rejected ballots		37	0.35%	-
Conservative gain from Liberal		Swing	+8.2	

==== Toronto Centre ====
The riding of Toronto Centre became vacant on July 2, 2007, with the resignation of Liberal MP Bill Graham.

The original Conservative candidate, Mark Warner, was dropped by the party's national council on October 31, 2007, reportedly for not following party policy. Warner eventually endorsed Rae rather than his replacement as Conservative candidate, Don Meredith, after Meredith reportedly told a voter who asked him a question about the ongoing bedbug problem in the St. Jamestown neighbourhood to improve their personal hygiene.

Voter turnout: 23,951 of 85,976 registered electors (27.9%).

By-election on March 17, 2008
Party	Candidate	Votes	%	±%
Liberal	Bob Rae	14,187	59.23	+7.03
New Democratic	El-Farouk Khaki	3,312	13.83	-9.91
Green	Chris Tindal	3,199	13.36	+8.15
Conservative	Don Meredith	2,939	12.27	-5.94
Animal Alliance	Liz White	123	0.51	+0.39
Canadian Action	Doug Plumb	97	0.40	-
Total rejected ballots		96	0.40	-
Liberal hold		Swing	+8.5	

==== Vancouver Quadra ====
The riding of Vancouver Quadra became vacant on July 27, 2007 with the resignation of Liberal MP Stephen Owen. Joyce Murray won the Liberal nomination in the riding and faced a hard-fought campaign against Conservative challenger Deborah Meredith. Murray, originally an MLA and former provincial cabinet minister from New Westminster, grew up in the riding, but recently moved back to run for federal office. Her campaign was focussed on environmental issues. Meredith is a UBC law lecturer and has lived in Vancouver Quadra her whole life, campaigned primarily on a tougher judicial system. NDP candidate and UBC student Rebecca Coad focussed her attacks on Murray, criticizing her record as provincial environment minister in Gordon Campbell's government. Green Party candidate Dan Grice, a technology consultant, ran a campaign based on cutting down on carbon emissions and tax shifting, hoping for an electoral breakthrough for his party.

On election day, early results showed Murray and Meredith in a dead heat, see-saw race. Later in the night, Murray was able to capture a more comfortable lead of several hundred votes, and the media declared her the winner. However, as the advanced polls were opened and counted, Meredith started to close the gap. After all 237 polls were counted, Murray remained in the lead, finishing with a narrow 151 (0.53%) vote margin above her Conservative opponent.

Voter turnout: 28,165 of 83,121 registered electors (33.9%).

Canadian federal by-election, March 17, 2008: Vancouver Quadra By-election due to the resignation of Stephen Owen
Party	Candidate	Votes	%	±%	Expenditures
Liberal	Joyce Murray	10,155	36.05	–13.09	$71,893.89
Conservative	Deborah Meredith	10,004	35.52	+6.63	$86,019.40
New Democratic	Rebeccca Coad	4,064	14.43	–1.65	$58,965.05
Green	Dan Grice	3,792	13.46	+8.36	$36,542.40
Rhinoceros	John Turner	111	0.39	–	none listed
Canadian Action	Psamuel Frank	40	0.14	–	$63.65
Total valid votes/expense limit		28,166	99.73	–	$87,207.82
Total rejected ballots		77	0.27	+0.05	
Turnout		28,243	33.78	–33.77	
Eligible voters		83,602			
Liberal hold		Swing		–9.86	
Source: Elections Canada

==== Willowdale ====
The riding of Willowdale became vacant on July 12, 2007 with the resignation of Liberal MP Jim Peterson. Martha Hall Findlay, former Liberal leadership contestant, was a star candidate. She faced Conservative lawyer Maureen Harquail, NDP candidate Rini Ghosh, and Green candidate Lou Carcasole. On election night, Hall Findlay garnered nearly 60% of the vote.

Voter turnout: 22,797 of 93,413 registered electors (24.4%).

By-election on March 17, 2008
Party	Candidate	Votes	%	±%
Liberal	Martha Hall Findlay	13,507	59.15%	+6.92%
Conservative	Maureen Harquail	6,841	29.96%	+0.65%
Green	Lou Carcasole	1,314	5.75%	+1.66%
New Democratic	Rini Ghosh	1,082	4.74%	-6.61%
Total rejected ballots		93	0.41%	-
Liberal hold		Swing	+3.1	

=== Cancelled by-elections ===
Four by-elections scheduled for September 2008 were pre-empted by the issuance on September 7 of election writs for the 2008 federal election. In all four ridings, the by-election candidates continued to represent their parties into the general election.

==== Westmount—Ville-Marie ====
The riding of Westmount—Ville-Marie had been vacant since January 25, 2008 due to the resignation of Liberal MP Lucienne Robillard. The nominated candidates were Marc Garneau (Liberal), Charles Larivée (Bloc Québécois), Guy Dufort (Conservative), Anne Lagacé Dowson (New Democrat), Claude William Genest (Green) and independents Régent Millette, David Sommer Rovins and Ronald Andrew Wattie.

The by-election was scheduled for September 8.

==== Saint-Lambert ====
The riding of Saint-Lambert had been vacant since March 13, 2008 due to Bloc Québécois MP Maka Kotto's resignation in order to run for a seat in the Quebec National Assembly. Kotto was elected to the National Assembly in a May 12, 2008 provincial by-election. The new BQ candidate was Josée Beaudin. The NDP nominated Richard Marois, president of the Conseil régional de l'environnement de la Montérégie, the Liberals ran lawyer and Crown attorney Roxane Stanners, the Conservative candidate was Patrick Clune, and the Greens nominated occupational therapist Diane Joubert.

The by-election was scheduled for September 8.

==== Guelph ====
The riding of Guelph was held by Liberal Brenda Chamberlain, until she resigned her seat effective April 7, 2008. The Conservative candidate was originally businessman Brent Barr, but his candidacy was rejected by the party in October without specific reasons for the move being made public. Municipal councillor Gloria Kovach was subsequently nominated as the Conservative candidate and faced lawyer Frank Valeriote for the Liberals, author and broadcaster Tom King for the NDP, business manager Mike Nagy for the Greens, Philip Bender ran for the Libertarians, Kornelis Klevering ran for the Marijuana Party, Karen Levenson ran for the Animal Alliance Environment Voters Party, Manuel Couto for the Marxist-Leninist Party, Drew Garvie for the Communist Party and John Turmel ran as an independent.

The by-election was scheduled for September 8.

==== Don Valley West ====
The riding of Don Valley West was held by Liberal John Godfrey who initially said he would resign from the House of Commons on July 1, 2008 in order to accept a position as headmaster of Toronto French School, but delayed his resignation until August 1. The delay was reportedly at the request of the Liberal Party which, the National Post claimed did not want to fight four by-elections simultaneously for financial reasons. Godfrey's office stated the delay was due to a private members bill Godfrey had worked on not being given royal assent until June 26.

This by-election was scheduled for September 22. Due to the timing of Godfrey's retirement, the Don Valley West by-election could not have been added to the September 8 trio. Under current Canadian election law, a by-election cannot occur any earlier than 47 working days (an 11-day period to ensure that Elections Canada has been notified of the vacancy, plus a minimum 36-day campaign) after a vacancy occurs in the House.

Rob Oliphant was nominated as the Liberal Party's standard-bearer on March 2, 2008 after defeating former Parkdale—High Park MP Sarmite Bulte for the nomination on the fourth ballot. Constitutional lawyer Deborah Coyne had also contested the nomination but withdrew in February and backed Oliphant. The Conservative Party of Canada re-nominated 2006 candidate John Carmichael, the New Democratic Party nominated actor David Sparrow, while the Green Party nominated Georgina Wilcock, a medical doctor with specialist training in obstetrics and gynecology.

== See also ==
- List of federal by-elections in Canada
