= Jeremy Harrison =

Canadian politician (born 1978)

The Honourable Jeremy Harrison ECS MLA

Member of the Saskatchewan Legislative Assembly for Meadow Lake
- Incumbent
- Assumed office November 7, 2007
- Preceded by: Maynard Sonntag

Member of Parliament for Desnethé—Missinippi—Churchill River
- In office June 28, 2004 – February 5, 2006
- Preceded by: Rick Laliberte
- Succeeded by: Gary Merasty

Leader of the Government in the Legislative Assembly of Saskatchewan
- In office August 13, 2019 – May 24, 2024
- Premier: Scott Moe
- Preceded by: Greg Brkich
- Succeeded by: Lori Carr
- In office December 5, 2011 – June 5, 2014
- Premier: Brad Wall
- Preceded by: Dan D'Autremont
- Succeeded by: Ken Cheveldayoff

Personal details
- Born: January 29, 1978 (age 48) Saskatoon, Saskatchewan, Canada
- Party: Saskatchewan Party
- Other political affiliations: Conservative Party of Canada
- Education: University of Alberta (BA); University of Saskatchewan (MPA, JD)
- Occupation: Political staffer
- Profession: Law

Jeremy Harrison (born January 29, 1978) is a Canadian politician who has been a Member of the Legislative Assembly of Saskatchewan since 2007, representing the electoral district of Meadow Lake as a member of the Saskatchewan Party. He has served in the cabinets of both Brad Wall and Scott Moe. Harrison was also the Conservative Member of Parliament for the federal district of Desnethé—Missinippi—Churchill River, a district that encompasses the northern half of the province of Saskatchewan, from 2004 to 2006.

== Early life ==
Harrison grew up in the area of Meadow Lake, Saskatchewan, and graduated from Carpenter High School. He completed an undergraduate degree at the University of Alberta in Edmonton; he graduated with a Law degree from the University of Saskatchewan in 2004, and with a Master's of Public Administration from the Johnson Shoyama Graduate School of Public Policy in 2011.

Harrison first got involved in politics in 1996 when he purchased a membership with the Reform Party of Canada. He became more actively involved in Reform politics while studying in Alberta, ultimately working on Stephen Harper's Canadian Alliance and Conservative Party leadership campaigns in 2002 and 2004, and working as part of Harper's staff when he served as Leader of the Opposition prior to the 2004 federal election. During this time he became close friends with future Conservative leader Andrew Scheer.

== Federal politics ==
Harrison was elected to Parliament as a Conservative in that party's first federal election in 2004; Harrison was elected for Desnethé—Missinippi—Churchill River, which covers the northern half of Saskatchewan. The electoral win made Harrison one of the youngest MPs in the country. The Conservatives emerged from the election as the Official Opposition. Although the Conservatives would emerge from the 2006 federal election with a minority government, Harrison was narrowly defeated in his re-election bid by Liberal opponent Gary Merasty. On election night, the margin between Harrison and Merasty was 106 votes, which was reduced to 73 when election official reviewed the count sheets. Harrison raised questions about the result, alleging without evidence that intimidation and ballot stuffing by the Liberals resulted in the seat being "stolen"; in particular, Harrison pointed to apparent turnouts of 100 per cent on some First Nations in the district. However, a judicial recount demanded by Harrison confirmed Merasty's victory, by a margin of 67 votes. On February 20, Harrison announced that although remained "concerned", he would not pursue the matter further. Harrison was criticized for singling out First Nations polling stations in his allegations, while the high turnout at some polls was suggested to likely have been due to an underestimation of reserve populations.

Harrison was cited as being part of the Conservative Party's alleged "In and Out" funding scheme during the 2006 election, which saw the party exceed spending limits by transferring money back and forth between the national party and local campaigns. Harrison responded by pointing out nobody was "alleging that individual candidates did anything wrong".

== Provincial politics ==
Although Harrison was re-nominated to run again federally for the Conservatives in Desnethé—Missinippi—Churchill River, in June 2007 it was announced that he was going to be acclaimed as the Saskatchewan Party's candidate for Meadow Lake ahead of that year's provincial election. Harrison's late acclamation came after another candidate who intended on winning the nomination dropped out. In the November 2007 provincial election, Harrison was initially declared defeated by incumbent MLA Maynard Sonntag. However, a corrected error and absentee ballots actually gave Harrison a narrow, 37-vote lead over Sonntag, and his victory by 36 votes was confirmed by a recount. Harrison has since been re-elected four times, most recently in the 2024 general election.

Following the 2007 election, Harrison was named legislative secretary to the minister of energy and resources, northern resources, and oilsands development. On May 29, 2009, Premier Brad Wall appointed Harrison, who had quickly earned a reputation as an outspoken backbencher, to cabinet as Minister of Municipal Affairs. On June 29, 2010, he was moved to Minister of Enterprise and Trade in a cabinet shuffle, as well as deputy government house leader.

Following the 2011 election, Harrison was promoted to Government House Leader. Harrison was dropped from cabinet in May 2012, but retained his position as House Leader. In June 2014, Harrison returned to cabinet as associate minister of economy responsible for trade, tourism, innovation, and immigration. In August 2016, Harrison succeeded Bill Boyd as Minister of the Economy.

On August 19, 2017, Harrison announced his bid for the leadership of the Saskatchewan Party, just days after Premier Wall announced that he would be retiring from politics. Harrison stated that one of his top priorities would be opposing the federal carbon tax, while also stating that "very serious mistakes" had been made in the government's handling of the Global Transportation Hub (GTH), which was embroiled in scandal due to questionable land dealings. However, less than two weeks later, on September 1, Harrison withdrew from the race and announced that he would instead support Scott Moe, whom Harrison said shared his values and principles. Moe went on to win the contest. After Moe's win, Harrison was named to a new cabinet position as Minister of Export and Trade Development, and also minister responsible for immigration and careers training. Harrison also dropped his advocacy for a review of the GTH scandal.

On May 24, 2024, Harrison resigned his longtime position as Government House Leader following his admission to an allegation from Speaker of the Legislative Assembly Randy Weekes that he had once brought a gun with him into the Legislative Building; although he initially denied the allegation, Harrison then apologized and admitted to bringing "a properly cased long gun" into the building when he stopped there en route to hunting.

On November 7, 2024, following the 2024 general election, Harrison was named Minister of Crown Investments Corporation.

== Controversies ==
A CBC News investigative report published in October 2024 showed that in January 2022, Harrison fired the board chair of the Saskatchewan Research Council—a crown corporation for which Harrison was the responsible minister—after the chair had raised concerns about conflicts of interest over board members and government contracts. Board chair Dennis Fitzpatrick blew the whistle on apparent conflicts of interest involving SRC president and CEO Mike Crabtree and other board members single sourcing to close business associates in regards to a rare-earth element processing project. Although Harrison told the Legislature in January 2023 that he did not involve himself in "board stuff" with the SRC, documents demonstrate that Harrison responded to the incident by firing Fitzpatrick, accusing him of misconduct in his role as board chair. Fitzpatrick told CBC that Harrison was "rude and abrasive" during the episode, and refused to answer questions; Harrison also declined to answer questions from CBC over the controversy.

On May 16, 2024, Harrison was the subject of a series of allegations by Speaker Randy Weekes. In addition to charging Harrison with bringing a gun into the Legislative building—a charge Harrison later admitted and apologized for—Weekes stated that Harrison had sought permission to carry a handgun in the Legislative Building. Moreover, Weekes charged Harrison with leading a campaign of intimidation and harassment against the Speaker, alleging bullying and harassing text messages meant to influence the Speaker's rulings in favour of the government. Former Speaker Mark Docherty later alleged that he too had felt "pressurized" to "rule in the government's favour on everything" when in the role.

== Electoral history ==
=== Provincial elections ===
2024 Saskatchewan general election: Meadow Lake
Party	Candidate	Votes	%
Saskatchewan	Jeremy Harrison	4,010	62.49
New Democratic	Miles Nachbaur	2.010	31.32
Saskatchewan United	Denis Allchurch	296	4.61
Green	Candice Turner	101	1.57
Total		6,417	99.99
Source: Elections Saskatchewan

2020 Saskatchewan general election: Meadow Lake
Party	Candidate	Votes	%
Saskatchewan	Jeremy Harrison	4,540	71.63
New Democratic	Harmonie King	1,627	25.67
Green	Carol Vandale	171	2.70
Total		6,338	100.0
Source: Elections Saskatchewan

2016 Saskatchewan general election: Meadow Lake
Party	Candidate	Votes	%
Saskatchewan	Jeremy Harrison	4,395	70.46
New Democratic	Dwayne Lasas	1,430	22.93
Eric McCrimmon	305	4.89	
Green	Eric Schalm	107	1.72
Total		6,237	100.0
Source: Saskatchewan Archives - Election Results by Electoral Division; Elections Saskatchewan

2011 Saskatchewan general election: Meadow Lake
Party	Candidate	Votes	%
Saskatchewan	Jeremy Harrison	4,207	61.97
New Democratic	Helen Ben	2,491	36.69
Green	Susan Merasty	91	1.34
Total		6,789	100.0
Source: Saskatchewan Archives - Election Results by Electoral Division

2007 Saskatchewan general election: Meadow Lake
Party	Candidate	Votes	%
Saskatchewan	Jeremy Harrison	3,507	48.86
New Democratic	Maynard Sonntag	3,471	48.35
Liberal	Don Coupland	200	2.79
Total		7,178	100.0
Source: Saskatchewan Archives - Election Results by Electoral Division

=== Federal elections ===
2006 Canadian federal election: Desnethé—Missinippi—Churchill River
Party	Candidate	Votes	%
Liberal	Gary Merasty	10,191	41.37
Conservative	Jeremy Harrison	10,124	41.09
New Democratic	Anita Jackson	3,787	15.37
Green	John McDonald	534	2.17
Total		24,636	100.0
Source: Elections Canada

2004 Canadian federal election: Desnethé—Missinippi—Churchill River
Party	Candidate	Votes	%
Conservative	Jeremy Harrison	7,279	37.39
Liberal	Al Ducharme	5,815	29.87
New Democratic	Earl Cook	3,910	20.09
Independent	Rick Laliberte (X)	1,923	9.88
Green	Marcella Gall	539	2.77
Total		19,466	100.0
Source: Elections Canada

== Provincial cabinet positions ==
Saskatchewan provincial government of Scott Moe
Cabinet posts (3)
Predecessor	Office	Successor
Dustin Duncan	Minister of Crown Investments Corporation; November 7, 2024 –	Incumbent
Post Established	Minister of Immigration and Careers Training; February 2, 2018 – November 7, 2024	Jim Reiter
Steven Bonk	Minister of Export and Trade Development; February 2, 2018 – November 7, 2024	Warren Kaeding
Saskatchewan provincial government of Brad Wall
Cabinet posts (4)
Predecessor	Office	Successor
Bill Boyd	Minister of the Economy; August 23, 2016 – August 19, 2017	Steven Bonk
Post Established	Minister Responsible for Trade, Tourism, Innovation, and Immigration; June 5, 2014 – August 19, 2017	Steven Bonk
Ken Cheveldayoff	Minister of Enterprise; June 29, 2010 – May 25, 2012	Ministry Abolished
Bill Hutchinson	Minister of Municipal Affairs; May 29, 2009 – June 29, 2010	Darryl Hickie
