= Leroy Laliberte =

Canadian politician

Member of the Saskatchewan Legislative Assembly for Athabasca
- Incumbent
- Assumed office October 28, 2024
- Preceded by: Jim Lemaigre

Shadow Minister for First Nations and Métis Relations
- Incumbent
- Assumed office November 13, 2024
- Leader: Carla Beck

Personal details
- Party: Saskatchewan NDP
- Other political affiliations: Green Party of Saskatchewan (2020)

Leroy Laliberte is a Canadian politician who was elected to the Legislative Assembly of Saskatchewan in the 2024 general election, representing Athabasca as a member of the New Democratic Party.

== Early life and career ==
Laliberte is originally from Beauval, Saskatchewan. He is Métis. Prior to being elected, Laliberte worked as the community wellness manager for the Flying Dust First Nation.

In the 2020 provincial election, Laliberte was the Green Party candidate in Athabasca, receiving 6.70% of the vote.

== Electoral record ==
2024 Saskatchewan general election: Athabasca
Party	Candidate	Votes	%	±%
New Democratic	Leroy Laliberte	1,823	62.80	+22.40
Saskatchewan	Jim Lemaigre	1,035	35.65	-15.65
Green	Raven Reid	45	1.55	–
Total valid votes		2,903	99.15	
Total rejected ballots		25	0.85	+0.10
Turnout		2,928	31.45	+7.03
Eligible voters		9,310		
New Democratic gain from Saskatchewan		Swing		+18
Source: Elections Saskatchewan

2020 Saskatchewan general election: Athabasca
Party	Candidate	Votes	%	±%
New Democratic	Buckley Belanger	1,730	56.80	-7.88
Saskatchewan	Kelly Kwan	1,112	36.51	+12.79
Green	Leroy Laliberte	204	6.70	+4.75
Total valid votes		3,046	99.14	
Total rejected ballots		26	0.85	+0.44
Turnout		3,072	33.63	+0.22
Eligible voters		9,136		
New Democratic hold		Swing		-10.33
Source: Elections Saskatchewan
