= Rick Laliberte =

Canadian politician (born 1958)

Rick Laliberte MP

Member of Parliament for Churchill River
- In office June 2, 1997 – June 28, 2004
- Preceded by: riding created
- Succeeded by: Jeremy Harrison

Personal details
- Born: September 13, 1958 (age 67) Île-à-la-Crosse, Saskatchewan, Canada
- Party: NDP (1997–2000); Liberal (2000–2004); Independent (2004)
- Profession: School administrator

Rick Laliberte (born September 13, 1958) is a former Canadian politician. Laliberte was a Member of Parliament for the riding of Churchill River, a riding that encompasses the northern half of the province of Saskatchewan.

Laliberte was born and raised in Beauval, Saskatchewan. He is Métis and is fluent in Cree-Michif. He was elected as a New Democratic Party candidate in the 1997 federal election, but crossed the floor on September 27, 2000, to join the Liberal Party of Canada. He was re-elected as a Liberal party member in the 2000 federal election. He then left the Liberal Party prior to the 2004 election and failed to win reelection as an independent, coming in fourth behind the NDP, Liberals and the winning Conservative, Jeremy Harrison.

== Electoral record ==
2004 Canadian federal election: Desnethé—Missinippi—Churchill River
Party	Candidate	Votes	%	±%	Expenditures
Conservative	Jeremy Harrison	7,279	37.39	+1.62	$27,194
Liberal	Al Ducharme	5,815	29.87	-11.94	$52,686
New Democratic	Earl Cook	3,910	20.09	-1.72	$9,005
Independent	(x)Rick Laliberte	1,923	9.88	-31.93	–
Green	Marcella Gall	539	2.77	–	–
Total valid votes		19,466	100.00	–	
Total rejected ballots		76	0.39	-0.01	
Turnout		19,542	47.41	-12.1	
Conservative gain from Liberal		Swing		-6.8	

Note: Conservative vote is compared to the total of the Canadian Alliance vote and Progressive Conservative vote in the 2000 election.

2000 Canadian federal election: Churchill River
Party	Candidate	Votes	%	±%	Expenditures
Liberal	(x)Rick Laliberte	9,856	41.81	+13.41	$39,223
Alliance	Kerry Peterson	7,679	32.57	+0.59	$62,019
New Democratic	Ray Funk	5,141	21.81	-12.72	$48,853
Progressive Conservative	David J. Rogers	755	3.20	-1.90	–
Canadian Action	Brendan Cross	143	0.61	–	$1,398
Total valid votes		23,574	100.00		–
Total rejected ballots		95	0.40	-0.09	
Turnout		23,669	59.5	+2.3	
Liberal gain from New Democrat		Swing	-13.1		

Note: Canadian Alliance vote is compared to the Reform vote in the 1997 election.

1997 Canadian federal election: Churchill River
Party	Candidate	Votes	%	±%	Expenditures
New Democratic	Rick Laliberte	7,288	34.53	–	$41,198
Reform	Daryl Wiberg	6,750	31.98	–	$25,132
Liberal	Roy Bird	5,994	28.40	–	$40,104
Progressive Conservative	Bert Provost	1,077	5.10	–	$79
Total valid votes		21,109	100.00		–
Total rejected ballots		105	0.49		
Turnout		21,214	57.2		

== See also ==
- Politics of Saskatchewan
