= Jocelyn Coulon =

Journalist and political analyst

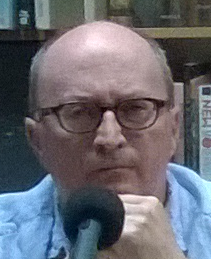
Jocelyn Coulon au lib. Olivieri.png

Jocelyn Coulon is an author, columnist, journalist, political analyst, and an international research expert in Quebec, Canada. He is well known for authoring various military and other international-related works. Coulon ran in a 2007 by-election for the Liberal Party of Canada in which he lost to the New Democratic Party (NDP) candidate Thomas Mulcair.

== Professional and educational background ==
Coulon attended the Université de Montréal and obtained a diploma in political sciences. He later became a columnist and journalist for Montreal newspaper Le Devoir and was in charge of the international news section. He worked as a journalist between 1985 and 1999 and later wrote opinions at La Presse. He was also director of monthly revue Aéromag from 1981 to 1984.

Before entering politics, he was also a researcher on various related international affairs, especially peace operations. He was the director of Francophone Network on Peace Operations of the Centre d'études et de recherches internationales de l'Université de Montréal between 2005 and 2016.

== Politics ==
In 2007, Coulon entered federal politics when he was handpicked by Liberal leader Stéphane Dion to run as a Liberal candidate for Outremont in a by-election that was held on September 17, 2007. The seat was vacated by former Transportation Minister Jean Lapierre who pursued his career as a political analyst at TVA. Coulon faced former provincial Liberal Environment Minister Thomas Mulcair from the NDP.

During his campaign, Coulon criticized the Conservative government of Stephen Harper on the handling of the War in Afghanistan, accusing them of complying with the policy of US President George W. Bush.

His nomination was heavily criticized by the B'nai Brith Canada Jewish group which accused him of being anti-American and anti-Israel because of his views on Middle East issues such as the Hamas-Israel-Lebanon conflict. The Quebec-Israel Committee however, stated that B'Nai Brith's statements were exaggerated and that Coulon had every right to be the Liberal candidate. These issues were thought to be important because the Jewish community in Outremont made up 10% of the riding population.

While Outremont had been a Liberal stronghold since 1935 (except for the 1988 election), the NDP won their first House of Commons of Canada seat in the province of Quebec since 1990. Coulon received 28.5% of the vote while Mulcair finished with 48.6%. For the most part, the campaign was a tight race between the two candidates, however late polls pointed to an NDP victory, with visits from star party members Ken Dryden and Justin Trudeau unable to regain the lead for the Liberals.

A Dion aide blamed the Outremont by-election on several factors, including poor organization, lack of communication, and lack of a clear policy on Quebec, while former MP Jean Lapierre suggested that it was due to Dion's 14% approval rating in the province. The Conservatives focused their attacks on the leadership skills of Dion, who had been campaigning in the riding. In addition, the Halifax Chronicle-Herald reported that unidentified "Dion loyalists" were accusing Michael Ignatieff supporters of undermining by-election efforts. Though Ignatieff phoned up Dion to deny the allegations, The Globe and Mail suggested that the report had a negative impact on the Liberals' morale, citing the NDP's widening lead after the article's release.

The by-election was seen as a crucial test for Dion's leadership, as the Liberals were attempting to regain popularity in Quebec since the loss during the 2006 federal elections.

Between 2016 and 2017, he was a senior political advisor and speechwriter to the Canadian Minister of Foreign Affairs.

== Published works ==
- En première ligne: Grandeurs et misères du systeme militaire (On the front line: the lengths and miseries of the military system) (1991)
- La dernière croisade: La Guerre du Golfe et le role caché du Canada (in collaboration with Yvan Cliche) (The last crusade: The Gulf War and the hidden role of Canada) (1992)
- Les Casques Bleus (Soldiers of Diplomacy: The United Nations, Peacekeeping, and The New World Order) (1994)
- L'Agression: les États-Unis, l'Irak et le monde (The aggression, the United States, Iraq and the world) (2004)
- Consolidation de la paix et fragilité étatique. L’ONU en République centrafricaine, 2015
- Dictionnaire mondial des opérations de paix 1948-2016
- Un selfie avec Justin Trudeau : regard critique sur la diplomatie du Premier ministre, 2018 (Canada is Not Back, 2019)
- À quoi sert le Conseil de sécurité des Nations Unies ?, 2020
- Le Canada à la recherche d’une identité internationale, 2021
- Marginalisé, réflexions sur l’isolement du Canada dans les relations internationales, 2022
- Ma France : portraits et autres considérations, 2023
- Le cours de l'Histoire, Mémoires, 2024.
