= Jim Lemaigre =

Canadian politician

Member of the Saskatchewan Legislative Assembly for Athabasca
- In office February 15, 2022 – October 1, 2024
- Preceded by: Buckley Belanger
- Succeeded by: Leroy Laliberte

Personal details
- Party: Conservative (federal); Saskatchewan Party (provincial)
- Occupation: RCMP Constable

Jim Lemaigre is a Canadian politician who was elected a member of the Legislative Assembly of Saskatchewan since winning the 2022 Athabasca provincial by-election. He defeated former federal MP Georgina Jolibois and won the traditional New Democratic stronghold constituency for the Saskatchewan Party. It was the first time a right-wing party has held the seat since its creation in 1908. In the 2024 Saskatchewan general election he was unseated by Leroy Laliberte. He was the Conservative Party of Canada candidate in Desnethé—Missinippi—Churchill River in the 2025 Canadian federal election. He was defeated by Liberal candidate Buckley Belanger.

== Personal life ==
He is a member of the Clearwater River Dene Nation. At the time of the 2025 Canadian federal election, he lived in Prince Albert, Saskatchewan.

== Electoral results ==
2025 Canadian federal election: Desnethé—Missinippi—Churchill River
** Preliminary results — Not yet official **
Party	Candidate	Votes	%	±%	Expenditures
Liberal	Buckley Belanger	5,876	65.09	+18.74	
Conservative	Jim Lemaigre	2,301	25.49	+1.92	
New Democratic	Doug Racine	850	9.42	–14.60	
Total valid votes/expense limit					
Total rejected ballots					
Turnout		9,027	37.12		
Eligible voters		24,317			
Liberal notional hold		Swing		+8.41	
Source: Elections Canada

2024 Saskatchewan general election: Athabasca
Party	Candidate	Votes	%	±%
New Democratic	Leroy Laliberte	1,823	62.80	+22.40
Saskatchewan	Jim Lemaigre	1,035	35.65	-15.65
Green	Raven Reid	45	1.55	
Total valid votes		2,903		
Total rejected ballots				
Turnout				
Eligible voters				
New Democratic gain		Swing		
Source: Elections Saskatchewan

Saskatchewan provincial by-election, 15 February 2022: Athabasca Resignation of Buckley Belanger
Party	Candidate	Votes	%	±%
Saskatchewan	Jim Lemaigre	1,163	51.3	+14.79%
New Democratic	Georgina Jolibois	916	40.4	-16.40%
Independent	Darwin Roy	157	6.9	-
Buffalo	Clint Arnason	12	0.5	-
Total valid votes		2,248	99.1	
Total rejected ballots		17	0.8	-0.05
Turnout		2,265	24.42	-9.21
Eligible voters		9,277		
Saskatchewan gain from New Democratic		Swing		+15.6
Source: Elections Saskatchewan
