= Gary Vidal =

Canadian politician

Member of Parliament for Desnethé—Missinippi—Churchill River
- In office October 21, 2019 – March 23, 2025
- Preceded by: Georgina Jolibois
- Succeeded by: Buckley Belanger

Personal details
- Born: 1964 or 1965 (age 60–61) Meadow Lake, Saskatchewan, Canada
- Party: Conservative Party of Canada
- Profession: accountant

Gary Vidal (born in 1965) is a Canadian politician who represented the riding of Desnethé—Missinippi—Churchill River in the House of Commons of Canada from 2019 Canadian federal election until 2025. In April 2024, Vidal, whose electoral boundary changed due to his residence being shifted, announced that he would not run for re-election in the 45th Canadian Federal Election because he did not anticipate that his party would allow for an open nomination.

== Political career ==
Vidal previously served as mayor of Meadow Lake, Saskatchewan from 2011 until his resignation in April 2019.

On April 23, 2024, Vidal announced that he will not seek re-election in the next federal election.

== Electoral record ==
=== Federal ===
2019 Canadian federal election: Desnethé—Missinippi—Churchill River
Party	Candidate	Votes	%	±%	Expenditures
Conservative	Gary Vidal	11,531	42.30	+12.17	$64,212.77
New Democratic	Georgina Jolibois	7,741	28.40	−5.75	$89,787.05
Liberal	Tammy Cook-Searson	7,225	26.51	−7.38	$63,291.05
Green	Sarah Kraynick	543	1.99	+0.17	$1,816.39
People's	Jerome Perrault	217	0.80	–	$2,050.00
Total valid votes/expense limit		27,257	99.21		
Total rejected ballots		216	0.79	+0.49	
Turnout		27,473	57.25	−7.47	
Eligible voters		47,985			
Conservative gain from New Democratic		Swing		+8.96	
Source: Elections Canada

=== Municipal ===
2016 Meadow Lake mayoral election
Candidate	Vote	%
Gary Vidal (X)	Acclaimed	

2012 Meadow Lake mayoral election
Candidate	Vote	%
Gary Vidal (X)	Acclaimed	
