= Rob Clarke (politician) =

Canadian politician and police officer

Robert G. Clarke

Member of Parliament for Desnethé—Missinippi—Churchill River
- In office March 17, 2008 – August 4, 2015
- Preceded by: Gary Merasty
- Succeeded by: Georgina Jolibois

Personal details
- Born: March 2, 1967 (age 59) Kitimat, British Columbia
- Party: Conservative
- Profession: RCMP officer

Robert G. Clarke (born March 2, 1967) is a politician and career Royal Canadian Mounted Police officer. He was the Conservative Party of Canada's candidate in Desnethé—Missinippi—Churchill River for the March 17, 2008 federal by-election in which he defeated Liberal candidate Joan Beatty.

A member of the Muskeg Lake First Nation, he grew up in Gibsons, Slocan, and Quesnel, British Columbia. At the time of his election to the House of Commons of Canada he had been a member of the RCMP for 18 years, all of which was spent in Saskatchewan, and had attained the rank of sergeant.

Clarke sponsored the Indian Act Amendment and Replacement Act as a private members bill. The bill became law in December 2014.

In the 2015 Canadian Election, Clarke finished third and was defeated by NDP candidate Georgina Jolibois by 1,190 votes.

== Electoral record ==
2015 Canadian federal election: Desnethé—Missinippi—Churchill River
Party	Candidate	Votes	%	±%	Expenditures
New Democratic	Georgina Jolibois	10,319	34.15	-11.23	$26,597.41
Liberal	Lawrence Joseph	10,237	33.88	+28.62	$50,341.46
Conservative	Rob Clarke	9,105	30.14	-16.75	$83,236.17
Green	Warren Koch	552	1.83	-0.64	$1,984.03
Total valid votes/expense limit		30,213	99.70		$228,699.20
Total rejected ballots		91	0.30	–	
Turnout		30,304	64.72	–	
Eligible voters		46,824			
New Democratic gain from Conservative		Swing		+2.76	
These results were subject to a judicial recount and modified from the validated results in accordance with the Judge's rulings. The margin of Georgina Jolibois over Lawrence Joseph increased from 71 votes to 82 votes as a result of the recount.
Source: Elections Canada

2011 Canadian federal election: Desnethé—Missinippi—Churchill River
Party	Candidate	Votes	%	±%	Expenditures
Conservative	Rob Clarke	10,509	47.93	+1.26	$74,871
New Democratic	Lawrence Joseph	9,715	44.30	+26.53	$74,655
Liberal	Gabe Lafond	1,144	5.22	-25.06	$57,456
Green	George Morin	560	2.55	-1.26	$4
Total valid votes/expense limit		21,928	99.57		–
Total rejected ballots		95	0.43	-0.11	
Turnout		22,023	50.35	+5.60	
Eligible voters		43,739			
Conservative hold		Swing		-12.64	

2008 Canadian federal election: Desnethé—Missinippi—Churchill River
Party	Candidate	Votes	%	±%	Expenditures
Conservative	Rob Clarke	8,964	46.67	-1.16	$81,066
Liberal	David Orchard	5,816	30.28	-1.30	$88,314
New Democratic	Brian Morin	3,414	17.77	+0.24	$1,459
Green	George Morin	733	3.82	+0.75	$1,387
First Peoples National	Rob Ballantyne	282	1.47	–	–
Total valid votes/expense limit		19,209	100.00		$90,390
Total rejected ballots		105	0.54	+0.19	
Turnout		19,314	44.75	+20.03	
Conservative hold		Swing		-1.1	

By-election on March 17, 2008: Desnethé—Missinippi—Churchill River
Party	Candidate	Votes	%	±%
Conservative	Rob Clarke	4,996	47.75%	+6.66%
Liberal	Joan Beatty	3,287	31.42%	-9.95%
New Democratic	Brian Morin	1,839	17.58%	+2.21%
Green	Robin Orr	340	3.25%	+1.09%
