= Buckley Belanger =

Canadian politician

The Honourable Buckley Belanger PC ECS MP
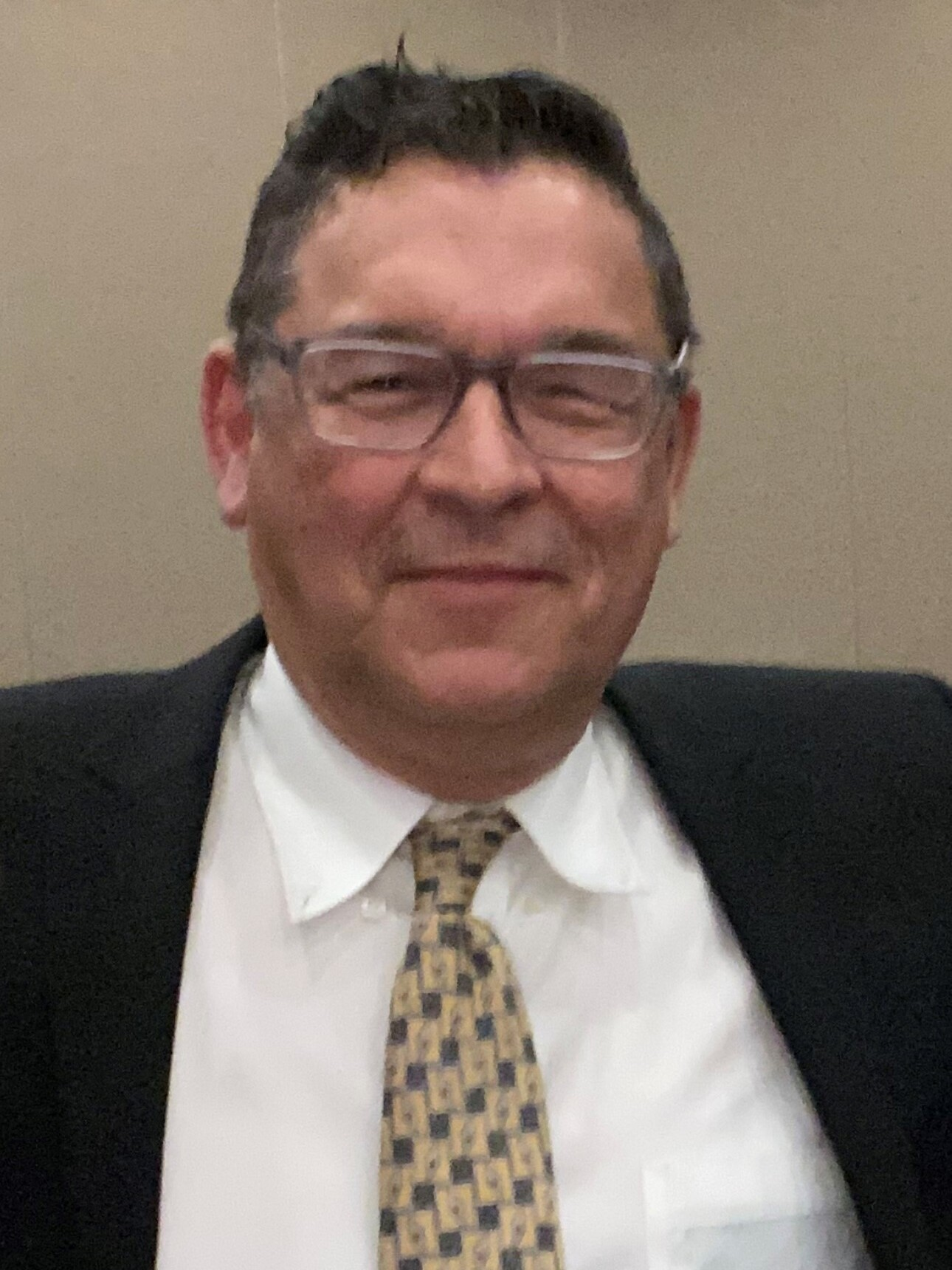
- Belanger in 2022

Secretary of State (Rural Development)
- Incumbent
- Assumed office May 13, 2025
- Prime Minister: Mark Carney
- Preceded by: Kody Blois

Member of Parliament for Desnethé—Missinippi—Churchill River
- Incumbent
- Assumed office April 28, 2025
- Preceded by: Gary Vidal

Member of the Saskatchewan Legislative Assembly for Athabasca
- In office June 21, 1995 – August 15, 2021
- Preceded by: Frederick John Thompson
- Succeeded by: Jim Lemaigre

Mayor of Île-à-la-Crosse
- In office 1988–1994

Personal details
- Born: March 21, 1960 (age 66) Île-à-la-Crosse, Saskatchewan, Canada
- Party: Liberal
- Other political affiliations: Saskatchewan New Democratic (1998–2021); Saskatchewan Liberal (until 1998)
- Spouse: Rebecca Pederson
- Occupation: Journalist

Harold "Buckley" Belanger (bell-ON-jay; born March 21, 1960) is a Canadian politician who has been Secretary of State (Rural Development) since 2025. Belanger was elected to the House of Commons in the 2025 federal election and serves as the member of Parliament (MP) for Desnethé—Missinippi—Churchill River in Saskatchewan. Belanger is of Métis descent and is a member of the Liberal Party of Canada.

Belanger previously served in provincial politics, as the member of the Legislative Assembly (MLA) for Athabasca from 1995 to 2021. He was initially elected with the Saskatchewan Liberal Party before switching to the Saskatchewan New Democratic Party (NDP) in 1998. In 2021, Belanger resigned as MLA to run federally as a Liberal in Desnethé—Missinippi—Churchill River, but lost to Conservative Gary Vidal. He ran again and won in 2025, becoming the only Liberal MP from Saskatchewan (a predominantly Conservative province).

== Political career ==
=== Saskatchewan provincial politics ===
He was originally elected to the Legislative Assembly in the 1995 general election as a Liberal member. He left the party to join the NDP in 1998, recontesting his seat in a by-election in which he attained 93.64 per cent of the vote, the second highest margin of victory ever attained by an electoral candidate in the province. He was swiftly placed in the cabinet by then Premier Roy Romanow. Belanger was re-elected in every provincial election to follow, most recently in the 2020 general election.

Belanger was a candidate in the 2001 Saskatchewan New Democratic Party leadership election, which was held after Roy Romanow announced his intention to resign as premier and party leader. He placed seventh, and Lorne Calvert was subsequently elected leader.

During his time as an MLA, Belanger served for almost a decade as a key member of the Roy Romanow and Lorne Calvert governments, including serving as minister for the Environment and Resource Management, associate minister for Intergovernmental and Aboriginal Affairs, and minister of Northern Affairs.

Prior to his election to the Saskatchewan legislature, Belanger served as mayor of Île-à-la-Crosse from 1988 to 1994 and worked as a journalist and administrator for MBC Radio. On August 15, 2021 he resigned from the legislature to run in the 2021 Canadian federal election, as a federal Liberal in Desnethé—Missinippi—Churchill River. He was defeated by Conservative candidate Gary Vidal. He was subsequent elected to again serve as mayor of Île-à-la-Crosse in 2024.

=== Federal politics ===
Belanger ran in the 2021 Canadian federal election, under the Liberal Party in Desnethé—Missinippi—Churchill River.

The federal Liberals again chose Belanger as their candidate in Desnethé—Missinippi—Churchill River ahead of the 2025 Canadian federal election. On May 13, 2025, he was appointed Secretary of State (Rural Development).

== Personal life ==
Belanger is Métis. He is married to Rebecca Pederson and they have three adult daughters.

== Electoral history ==
=== Federal elections ===
2025 Canadian federal election: Desnethé—Missinippi—Churchill River
** Preliminary results — Not yet official **
Party	Candidate	Votes	%	±%	Expenditures
Liberal	Buckley Belanger	5,876	65.09	+18.74	
Conservative	Jim Lemaigre	2,301	25.49	+1.92	
New Democratic	Doug Racine	850	9.42	–14.60	
Total valid votes/expense limit					
Total rejected ballots					
Turnout		9,027	37.12		
Eligible voters		24,317			
Liberal notional hold		Swing		+8.41	
Source: Elections Canada

2021 Canadian federal election
Party	Candidate	Votes	%	±%
Conservative	Gary Vidal	10,036	48.8	+6.5
Liberal	Buckley Belanger	5,533	26.8	+0.3
New Democratic	Harmonie King	3,548	17.2	-11.4
People's	Dezirae Reddekopp	1,002	4.9	+4.1
Independent	Stephen King	240	1.2	–
Green	Nasser Dean Chalifoux	215	1.0	-1.0
Total valid votes		20,574		
Total rejected ballots		127	0.6	-0.2
Turnout		20,701	44.8	-12.5
Eligible voters		46,257		
Conservative hold		Swing		+4.0
Source: Elections Canada

=== Provincial elections ===
2020 Saskatchewan general election: Athabasca
Party	Candidate	Votes	%	±%
New Democratic	Buckley Belanger	1,730	56.81	-7.86
Saskatchewan	Kelly Kwan	1,112	36.52	+12.80
Green	Leroy Laliberte	204	6.70	+4.75
Total valid votes		3,045	100.0	
Total rejected ballots			0.00	–
Turnout		–	–	–
Eligible voters		9,053		
Source: Elections Saskatchewan, Global News

2016 Saskatchewan general election: Athabasca
Party	Candidate	Votes	%	±%
New Democratic	Buckley Belanger	1,734	64.7%	–
Saskatchewan	Philip Elliott	625	23.3%	–
Liberal	Michael Wolverine	267	9.9%	–
Green	Max C.D. Morin	53	1.9%	–
Total valid votes		–	100.0	
Eligible voters		–		
New Democratic hold		Swing		-
Source: Elections Saskatchewan, Global News.

2011 Saskatchewan general election: Athabasca
Party	Candidate	Votes	%	±%
New Democratic	Buckley Belanger	1,867	63.79	+4.38
Saskatchewan	Bobby Woods	1,021	34.88	+2.99
Green	George Durocher	39	1.33	–1.88
Total valid votes		2,927	100.0	
New Democratic hold		Swing		+0.70

2007 Saskatchewan general election: Athabasca
Party	Candidate	Votes	%	±%
New Democratic	Buckley Belanger	1,885	59.41	–10.58
Saskatchewan	Phil Elliott	1,012	31.89	+8.54
Liberal	Malvina Iron	174	5.48	–0.54
Green	Sean Gilchrist	102	3.21	–
Total valid votes		3,173	100.0	
New Democratic hold		Swing		–9.56

2003 Saskatchewan general election: Athabasca
Party	Candidate	Votes	%	±%
New Democratic	Buckley Belanger	2,407	69.99	–14.39
Saskatchewan	Greg Ross	803	23.35	+20.80
Liberal	Philip Durocher	207	6.02	–7.05
Progressive Conservative	Sean Gilchrist	22	0.64	–
Total valid votes		3,439	100.0	
New Democratic hold		Swing		–17.60

1999 Saskatchewan general election: Athabasca
Party	Candidate	Votes	%	±%
New Democratic	Buckley Belanger	2,512	84.38	–9.26
Liberal	Allan Adam	389	13.06	+8.84
Saskatchewan	Bert Roach	76	2.55	+0.42
Total valid votes		2,977	100.0	
New Democratic hold		Swing		–9.05

Saskatchewan provincial by-election, 26 October 1998: Athabasca
Party	Candidate	Votes	%	±%
New Democratic	Buckley Belanger	2,153	93.64	+53.43
Liberal	Winston McKay	97	4.21	–41.37
Saskatchewan	Tyson Delorme	49	2.13	–
Total valid votes		2,299	100.0	
New Democratic gain from Liberal		Swing		+47.40

1995 Saskatchewan general election: Athabasca
Party	Candidate	Votes	%	±%
Liberal	Buckley Belanger	1,347	45.59	+40.85
New Democratic	Frederick John Thompson	1,188	40.21	–43.58
Independent	Jimmy Montgrand	390	13.20	–
Progressive Conservative	Clay Poupart	29	0.98	–7.54
Total valid votes		2,954	100.0	
Liberal gain from New Democratic		Swing		+42.22

Order of precedence
Preceded by Ruby Sahota as Secretary of State	Order of Precedence of Canada as Secretary of State	Succeeded by Stephen Fuhr as Secretary of State
