= Desnethé—Missinippi—Churchill River =

Federal electoral district in Saskatchewan, Canada

Saskatchewan electoral district
- Interactive map of riding boundaries from the 2025 federal election

Federal electoral district
- Legislature: House of Commons
MP
Buckley Belanger
Liberal
- District created: 1996
- First contested: 1997
- Last contested: 2025
- District webpage: profile, map

Demographics
- Population (2016): 70,891
- Electors (2019): 45,985
- Area (km²): 342,903
- Pop. density (per km²): 0.21
- Census division(s): Division No. 14, Division No. 15, Division No. 16, Division No. 17, Division No. 18
- Census subdivision(s): La Ronge, La Loche, Stanley, Pelican Narrows, Île-à-la-Crosse, Air Ronge, Lac La Ronge, Lac La Hache, Creighton, Chicken

Desnethé—Missinippi—Churchill River (French: Desnethé—Missinippi—Rivière Churchill; formerly known as Churchill River) is a federal electoral district in Saskatchewan, Canada, that has been represented in the House of Commons of Canada since 1997.

== Geography ==
This is a rural riding located in northern Saskatchewan. The riding encompasses the northern half of the province and is the third largest federal riding, that is located in a province, in Canada, trumped only by Churchill—Keewatinook Aski in Manitoba and Abitibi—Baie-James—Nunavik—Eeyou in Quebec. The territorial ridings of Yukon, Northwest Territories and Nunavut are also larger.

The 2023 redistribution order removed most of the territory outside of the Northern Saskatchewan Administration District from the riding, reducing its population considerably.

== Demographics ==
Panethnic groups in Desnethé—Missinippi—Churchill River (2011−2021)
Panethnic group	2021		2016		2011	
Panethnic group	Pop.	%	Pop.	%	Pop.	%
Indigenous	49,660	70.18%	49,840	70.91%	48,395	70.58%
European (Note: Statistic includes all persons that did not make up part of a visible minority or an indigenous identity.)	19,605	27.71%	19,650	27.96%	19,655	28.67%
Southeast Asian (Note: Statistic includes total responses of "Filipino" and "Southeast Asian" under visible minority section on census.)	690	0.98%	320	0.46%	250	0.36%
South Asian	320	0.45%	165	0.23%	40	0.06%
African	205	0.29%	160	0.23%	35	0.05%
East Asian (Note: Statistic includes total responses of "Chinese", "Korean", and "Japanese" under visible minority section on census.)	170	0.24%	130	0.18%	110	0.16%
Middle Eastern (Note: Statistic includes total responses of "West Asian" and "Arab" under visible minority section on census.)	25	0.04%	10	0.01%	0	0%
Latin American	20	0.03%	30	0.04%	0	0%
Other/multiracial (Note: Statistic includes total responses of "Visible minority, n.i.e." and "Multiple visible minorities" under visible minority section on census.)	60	0.08%	10	0.01%	0	0%
Total responses	70,760	98.98%	70,290	99.15%	68,565	98.7%
Total population	71,488	100%	70,891	100%	69,471	100%
Notes: Totals greater than 100% due to multiple origin responses. Demographics based on 2012 Canadian federal electoral redistribution riding boundaries.

According to the 2011 Canadian census; 2013 representation

Languages: 64.6% English, 21.3% Cree, 10.8% Dene, 1.3% French
Religions: 76.8% Christian (41.5% Catholic, 18.5% Anglican, 4.1% United Church, 2.5% Lutheran, 1.6% Pentecostal, 8.5% Other), 2.7% Traditional Aboriginal Spirituality, 20.4% No religion
Median income (2010): $18,910
Average income (2010): $28,554

Desnethé—Missinippi—Churchill River boasts the following demographic records:

- Highest % of people of the Métis aboriginal group (16.4%)
- Highest % of people of Métis ethnic origin (12.0%)
- Highest % of people with Dene as their mother tongue (10.5%)

== History ==
The electoral district was created as "Churchill River" in 1996 from Prince Albert—Churchill River, Mackenzie and The Battlefords—Meadow Lake ridings.

In 2004, it was renamed "Desnethé—Missinippi—Churchill River".

This riding lost territory to Prince Albert and a fraction to Yorkton—Melville, and gained a fraction of territory from Prince Albert during the 2012 electoral redistribution.

=== 2006 election controversy ===
In the 2006 federal election, Liberal candidate Gary Merasty defeated incumbent Conservative MP Jeremy Harrison by a slim margin of 68 votes after trailing much of the election night, despite Harrison's vote increasing several points. Merasty's win raised issues of questionable tactics to increase voter turnout. However, an investigation conducted by Elections Canada determined that no wrongdoing had taken place.

=== 2015 election recount ===
In the 2015 federal election, New Democrat candidate Georgina Jolibois defeated the Liberal candidate, Lawrence Joseph, by a narrow margin of 71 votes. Joseph requested a judicial recount of the votes.

== Members of Parliament ==
This riding has elected the following members of the House of Commons of Canada:

Parliament	Years	Member	Party
Churchill River; Riding created from Prince Albert—Churchill River, Mackenzie and The Battlefords—Meadow Lake
36th	1997–2000	Rick Laliberte	New Democratic
36th	2000–2000	Rick Laliberte	Liberal
37th	2000–2004	Rick Laliberte	Liberal
Desnethé—Missinippi—Churchill River
38th	2004–2006	Jeremy Harrison	Conservative
39th	2006–2007	Gary Merasty	Liberal
39th	2008–2008	Rob Clarke	Conservative
40th	2008–2011	Rob Clarke	Conservative
41st	2011–2015	Rob Clarke	Conservative
42nd	2015–2019	Georgina Jolibois	New Democratic
43rd	2019–2021	Gary Vidal	Conservative
44th	2021–2025	Gary Vidal	Conservative
45th	2025–present	Buckley Belanger	Liberal

== Election results ==
View source data.
Graph of election results in Desnethé—Missinippi—Churchill River (minor parties that never got 2% of the vote or didn't run consistently are omitted)

=== Desnethé—Missinippi—Churchill River, 2004–present ===
2025 Canadian federal election
** Preliminary results — Not yet official **
Party	Candidate	Votes	%	±%	Expenditures
Liberal	Buckley Belanger	5,876	65.09	+18.74	
Conservative	Jim Lemaigre	2,301	25.49	+1.92	
New Democratic	Doug Racine	850	9.42	–14.60	
Total valid votes/expense limit					
Total rejected ballots					
Turnout		9,027	37.12		
Eligible voters		24,317			
Liberal notional hold		Swing		+8.41	
Source: Elections Canada

2021 federal election redistributed results
Party	Vote	%
Liberal	3,811	46.35
New Democratic	1,975	24.02
Conservative	1,938	23.57
People's	257	3.13
Independent	146	1.78
Green	96	1.17

2021 Canadian federal election
Party	Candidate	Votes	%	±%	Expenditures
Conservative	Gary Vidal	10,036	48.8	+6.5	$83,338.84
Liberal	Buckley Belanger	5,533	26.8	+0.3	$98,928.73
New Democratic	Harmonie King	3,548	17.2	-11.4	$35,359.65
People's	Dezirae Reddekopp	1,002	4.9	+4.1	$1,007.06
Independent	Stephen King	240	1.2	–	$0.00
Green	Nasser Dean Chalifoux	215	1.0	-1.0	$1,294.43
Total valid votes/Expense limit		20,574	–	–	$121,058.43
Total rejected ballots		127	0.6	-0.2	
Turnout		20,701	44.8	-12.5	
Eligible voters		46,257			
Conservative hold		Swing		+4.0	
Source: Elections Canada

2019 Canadian federal election
Party	Candidate	Votes	%	±%	Expenditures
Conservative	Gary Vidal	11,531	42.30	+12.17	$64,212.77
New Democratic	Georgina Jolibois	7,741	28.40	−5.75	$89,787.05
Liberal	Tammy Cook-Searson	7,225	26.51	−7.38	$63,291.05
Green	Sarah Kraynick	543	1.99	+0.17	$1,816.39
People's	Jerome Perrault	217	0.80	–	$2,050.00
Total valid votes/expense limit		27,257	99.21		
Total rejected ballots		216	0.79	+0.49	
Turnout		27,473	57.25	−7.47	
Eligible voters		47,985			
Conservative gain from New Democratic		Swing		+8.96	
Source: Elections Canada

2015 Canadian federal election
Party	Candidate	Votes	%	±%	Expenditures
New Democratic	Georgina Jolibois	10,319	34.15	-11.23	$26,597.41
Liberal	Lawrence Joseph	10,237	33.88	+28.62	$50,341.46
Conservative	Rob Clarke	9,105	30.14	-16.75	$83,236.17
Green	Warren Koch	552	1.83	-0.64	$1,984.03
Total valid votes/expense limit		30,213	99.70		$228,699.20
Total rejected ballots		91	0.30	–	
Turnout		30,304	64.72	–	
Eligible voters		46,824			
New Democratic gain from Conservative		Swing		+2.76	
These results were subject to a judicial recount and modified from the validated results in accordance with the Judge's rulings. The margin of Georgina Jolibois over Lawrence Joseph increased from 71 votes to 82 votes as a result of the recount.
Source: Elections Canada

2011 federal election redistributed results
Party	Vote	%
Conservative	9,767	46.88
New Democratic	9,454	45.38
Liberal	1,097	5.27
Green	514	2.47

2011 Canadian federal election
Party	Candidate	Votes	%	±%	Expenditures
Conservative	Rob Clarke	10,509	47.93	+1.26	$74,871
New Democratic	Lawrence Joseph	9,715	44.30	+26.53	$74,655
Liberal	Gabe Lafond	1,144	5.22	-25.06	$57,456
Green	George Morin	560	2.55	-1.26	$4
Total valid votes/expense limit		21,928	99.57		–
Total rejected ballots		95	0.43	-0.11	
Turnout		22,023	50.35	+5.60	
Eligible voters		43,739			
Conservative hold		Swing		-12.64	

2008 Canadian federal election
Party	Candidate	Votes	%	±%	Expenditures
Conservative	Rob Clarke	8,964	46.67	-1.16	$81,066
Liberal	David Orchard	5,816	30.28	-1.30	$88,314
New Democratic	Brian Morin	3,414	17.77	+0.24	$1,459
Green	George Morin	733	3.82	+0.75	$1,387
First Peoples National	Rob Ballantyne	282	1.47	–	–
Total valid votes/expense limit		19,209	100.00		$90,390
Total rejected ballots		105	0.54	+0.19	
Turnout		19,314	44.75	+20.03	
Conservative hold		Swing		-1.1	

By-election on March 17, 2008
Party	Candidate	Votes	%	±%
Conservative	Rob Clarke	4,992	47.83	+6.74
Liberal	Joan Beatty	3,296	31.58	-9.79
New Democratic	Brian Morin	1,830	17.53	+2.16
Green	Robin Orr	320	3.07	+0.90
Total valid votes		10,438	100.00	
Total rejected ballots		37	0.35	-0.01
Turnout		10,475	24.72	-33.71
Conservative gain from Liberal		Swing		-8.3

2006 Canadian federal election
Party	Candidate	Votes	%	±%	Expenditures
Liberal	Gary Merasty	10,191	41.37	+11.50	$69,229
Conservative	(x)Jeremy Harrison	10,124	41.09	+3.70	$78,578
New Democratic	Anita Jackson	3,787	15.37	-4.72	$43,976
Green	John McDonald	534	2.17	-0.60	$128
Total valid votes		24,636	100.00		–
Total rejected ballots		88	0.36	-0.03	
Turnout		24,724	58.43	+11.02	
Liberal gain from Conservative		Swing	-3.9		

2004 Canadian federal election
Party	Candidate	Votes	%	±%	Expenditures
Conservative	Jeremy Harrison	7,279	37.39	+1.62	$27,194
Liberal	Al Ducharme	5,815	29.87	-11.94	$52,686
New Democratic	Earl Cook	3,910	20.09	-1.72	$9,005
Independent	(x)Rick Laliberte	1,923	9.88	-31.93	–
Green	Marcella Gall	539	2.77	–	–
Total valid votes		19,466	100.00	–	
Total rejected ballots		76	0.39	-0.01	
Turnout		19,542	47.41	-12.1	
Conservative gain from Liberal		Swing		-6.8	

Note: Conservative vote is compared to the total of the Canadian Alliance vote and Progressive Conservative vote in the 2000 election.

=== Churchill River, 1997–2004 ===
2000 Canadian federal election
Party	Candidate	Votes	%	±%	Expenditures
Liberal	(x)Rick Laliberte	9,856	41.81	+13.41	$39,223
Alliance	Kerry Peterson	7,679	32.57	+0.59	$62,019
New Democratic	Ray Funk	5,141	21.81	-12.72	$48,853
Progressive Conservative	David J. Rogers	755	3.20	-1.90	–
Canadian Action	Brendan Cross	143	0.61	–	$1,398
Total valid votes		23,574	100.00		–
Total rejected ballots		95	0.40	-0.09	
Turnout		23,669	59.5	+2.3	
Liberal gain from New Democrat		Swing	-13.1		

Note: Canadian Alliance vote is compared to the Reform vote in the 1997 election.

1997 Canadian federal election
Party	Candidate	Votes	%	±%	Expenditures
New Democratic	Rick Laliberte	7,288	34.53	–	$41,198
Reform	Daryl Wiberg	6,750	31.98	–	$25,132
Liberal	Roy Bird	5,994	28.40	–	$40,104
Progressive Conservative	Bert Provost	1,077	5.10	–	$79
Total valid votes		21,109	100.00		–
Total rejected ballots		105	0.49		
Turnout		21,214	57.2		

== See also ==
- List of Canadian electoral districts
- Historical federal electoral districts of Canada
