= Gary Merasty =

Canadian politician

Member of Parliament for Desnethé—Missinippi—Churchill River
- In office April 3, 2006 – August 31, 2007
- Preceded by: Jeremy Harrison
- Succeeded by: Rob Clarke

Personal details
- Born: September 22, 1964 (age 62) Winnipeg, Manitoba
- Party: Liberal Party of Canada
- Spouse: Brenda Merasty
- Profession: Aboriginal leader, business consultant

Gary Merasty (born September 22, 1964, in Winnipeg, Manitoba) is a Canadian politician and former Liberal Member of Parliament for Desnethé—Missinippi—Churchill River in northern Saskatchewan. A former two-time Grand Chief of the Prince Albert Grand Council, Merasty is a member of the Peter Ballantyne Cree Nation within Treaty 6 territory. He is the first Status First Nations person to be elected in Saskatchewan.

== Early life ==
Merasty was born on September 22, 1964, in Winnipeg, Manitoba, and was raised in Pelican Narrows, Saskatchewan, by his mother Theresa and his aunts.

== Entry into federal politics ==
In one of the closest races of the 2006 federal election, Merasty defeated Conservative incumbent Jeremy Harrison. On election night, Merasty's victory was reported as 10,225 to 10,119, a margin of 106. Jeremy Harrison challenged the result, but a judicial recount confirmed Merasty's victory by a reduced margin of 67 votes. On the morning after the election, Harrison alleged widespread misconduct. However, an investigation conducted by Elections Canada determined that no wrongdoing had taken place.

== Political career ==
As a Member of Parliament, Merasty served on the House of Commons Standing Committee on Agriculture and Agri-Food, the Standing Committee on Aboriginal Affairs and Northern Development and the Legislative Committee on Bill C-2. He also sat on the Standing Committee on Human Resources, Social Development and the Status of Persons with Disabilities.

=== Liberal caucus ===
In the Liberal caucus, he served as Indian Affairs associate critic and was a Special Advisor for Aboriginal Outreach.

=== Motion to implement the Kelowna Accord ===
Merasty introduced a motion to implement the Kelowna Accord on Sept. 29, 2006. Although the motion was opposed by the federal Conservative government, it passed by a vote of 160–113.

=== Motion to apologize to survivors of the residential school system ===
Merasty also introduced a motion for the federal government to offer a formal apology to survivors of the Canadian residential school system, which received unanimous all-party support in the House of Commons.

Merasty first asked the federal government to offer a formal apology to survivors of the residential school system on Nov. 7, 2006. Merasty raised the question again on March 27, 2007, after Minister of Indian Affairs and Northern Development and Federal Interlocutor for Métis and Non-Status Indians Jim Prentice suggested an apology was unnecessary since the primary aim of the schools was "to provide education for aboriginal children." Prentice again refused to offer an apology.

In response, on May 1, 2007, Merasty introduced a motion into the House of Commons to calling on the House to "apologize to the survivors of the Indian Residential Schools for the trauma they suffered as a result of the policies intended to assimilate First Nations, Inuit and Métis children, causing the loss of aboriginal culture, heritage and language, while also leaving a sad legacy of emotional, physical and sexual abuse." After Merasty introduced the motion, Prentice announced the Conservatives would support it, allowing the apology to pass unanimously (257-0).

=== Retirement from politics ===
In July 2007, Merasty announced he was stepping down as MP for the riding on Aug. 31, to pursue a career in the private sector. A few months later in September, Merasty was appointed VP, Corporate Responsibility and Communications at Cameco Corporation. In 2013, Des Nedhe Development announced the appointment of Merasty as president and CEO.

== Awards and boards ==
1996—Peter Ballantyne Cree Nation Pelican Narrows Community Service Award.

2006—Eagle Feather News Newsmaker of the Year.

2012—Diamond Jubilee Medal.

Merasty has received both the Queen Elizabeth II Golden Jubilee Medal (2004) and the Commemorative Medal for the Centennial of Saskatchewan (2005) for his service to the people of Saskatchewan. Board of Directors Northwest Company (TSX traded company); Board of Directors Children's Hospital of Saskatchewan (2010 to present); Board of Directors Canada West Foundation ( 2008 to present); Chair, Northern Career Quest (2008 to present); Board of Directors Enterprise Saskatchewan (2008–11); Chair, Saskatchewan Indian Gaming Association (SIGA) (2000–05); Board of Directors, Dakota Dunes Golf and Country Club (2003–05); Board of Directors Saskatoon Airport Authority (2003–05); Board of Directors Western First Nations Hospitality (2002–05); Chair and director Northern Broadband Initiative (2002–05); Chair and director Westwind Aviation Ltd. (2001–05); Chair and director Northern Development Board (1999-2004); Chair and director Saskatchewan Indian Institute of Technologies (SIIT) and Saskatchewan Indian Training Assessment Group (SITAG) (1999-2005).

== Education ==
Merasty holds Bachelor and master's degrees in Education from the University of Saskatchewan. Merasty was named in the 100 Alumni of Influence by the University of Saskatchewan in 2007. In 2005, he received an honorary diploma in Entrepreneurship and Small Business from the Saskatchewan Institute of Applied Science and Technology.

== Electoral record ==
2006 Canadian federal election: Desnethé—Missinippi—Churchill River
Party	Candidate	Votes	%	±%	Expenditures
Liberal	Gary Merasty	10,191	41.37	+11.50	$69,229
Conservative	(x)Jeremy Harrison	10,124	41.09	+3.70	$78,578
New Democratic	Anita Jackson	3,787	15.37	-4.72	$43,976
Green	John McDonald	534	2.17	-0.60	$128
Total valid votes		24,636	100.00		–
Total rejected ballots		88	0.36	-0.03	
Turnout		24,724	58.43	+11.02	
Liberal gain from Conservative		Swing	-3.9		
