= Reform Party of Canada candidates in the 1993 Canadian federal election =

The Reform Party of Canada fielded candidates in every Canadian province except Quebec in the 1993 federal election. Fifty-two candidates were elected. Many of the party's candidates have their own biography pages; information about others may be found here.

== Ontario ==
=== Lincoln: Andy Sweck ===
Andy Sweck was born in Hamilton, and is of Polish and Ukrainian background. He has a Bachelor's Degree from McMaster University, and joined Stelco as a graduate trustee in 1978. At the time of his political career, he was a senior supervisor for the company. He joined the Reform Party in 1991, and was a founding member of its Hamilton Mountain constituency association. He ran for the party in Lincoln in the 1993 federal election, and finished second against Liberal Tony Valeri.

Sweck ran against prominent national politician Sheila Copps in a 1996 by-election. His campaign was marked by controversy: one day after he was chosen as a candidate, Sweck fired Terry Ott as his campaign manager. Ott later claimed that he was dismissed at the behest of the party's national executive, who were seeking to take over the local campaign. Sweck rejected this explanation, and said that he simply did not believe Ott was the most qualified person for the position. Ott also said that the nomination meeting had been rigged in Sweck's favour; both Sweck and the defeated candidate denied this.

Sweck sought to focus attention on Copps's record, and particularly her party's broken promise on eliminating Canada's Goods and Services Tax. He also called for reforms to the Young Offenders Act, such that persons as young as ten could be charged with committing violent crimes. He finished fourth, in what was considered a disappointing result for the party, and returned to private life.

Electoral record
Election	Division	Party	Votes	%	Place	Winner
1993 federal	Lincoln	Reform	14,325	25.74	2/7	Tony Valeri, Liberal
federal by-election, 17 June 1996	Hamilton East	Reform	2,750	10.33	4/13	Sheila Copps, Liberal

=== Nickel Belt: Janice Weitzel ===
Janice Weitzel was a supply teacher. She received 5,604 votes (12.70%), finishing third against Liberal candidate Ray Bonin. Her campaign was generally regarded to have taken votes from the second-place New Democratic Party, and to have indirectly helped the Liberals.

=== Ottawa—Vanier: Sam Dancey ===
Dancey holds a Master of Arts degree (1981) from the Occidental Institute of Chinese Studies in Miami, Florida. He was thirty-nine years old during the election, and operated a foster home for emotionally disturbed children (Ottawa Citizen, 7 October 1993). He promoted fast expansion of Highway 16 and improved air links with the United States, and rejected suggestions that the Reform Party's plans to reduce the national civil service would cause significant unemployment rises in Ottawa Citizen, 7 October 1993).

He received 3,830 votes (7.89%), finishing third against Liberal incumbent Jean-Robert Gauthier. He campaigned for the party's nomination in a 1995 by-election in Ottawa—Vanier, but lost to Kevin Gaudet (Ottawa Citizen, 7 January 1995).

Dancey wrote opinion-editorials on behalf of the Reform Party during the 1990s, arguing in support of "territorial bilingualism" (Montreal Gazette, 18 July 1994) and criticizing affirmative action programs as discriminatory (Ottawa Citizen, 23 July 1995). During the 1999 provincial election, he accused the labour movement of promoting violence at Queen's Park (Ottawa Citizen, 1 June 1999).

=== Parkdale—High Park: Lee Primeau ===
Primeau is a graduate of Southeastern University in Lakeland, Florida, and Missouri State University in Springfield, Missouri. He holds both Bachelor of Arts and Master of Arts degrees. He is also a business consultant, President and CEO of Leader_Shift Inc., and is the owner and co-founder of eSO’L Connection Inc. He was thirty-four years old at the time of the 1993 election, and lived in Mississauga. He received 6,647 votes (16.16%), finishing second against Liberal incumbent Jesse Flis.

=== Parry Sound-Muskoka: Jim Newman ===
Jim Newman worked on campaigns for the Liberal Party of Canada during Pierre Trudeau's leadership and joined the Reform Party in 1992. He was a real estate broker in Sundridge in 1993 and was president of the Eagle Lake Revolver Club. He received 13,022 votes (28.19%), finishing second against Liberal candidate Andy Mitchell.

As of 2010, Newman is leader of a small national organization called the Canadian Firearms Institute.

=== Scarborough Southwest: Aubrey Millard ===
Millard was a high school teacher and counsellor. He called for "greater certainty in criminal sentencing", and said he would work for the "integration of immigrants into society" (Toronto Star, 22 October 1993). At one all-candidates meeting, he argued that immigration levels to Canada were too high and should be cut in half. This remark was criticized by other candidates, and particularly by New Democrat Steve Thomas (Toronto Star, 19 October 1993). He received 8,314 votes (21.21%), finishing second against Liberal incumbent Tom Wappel.

=== St. Paul's: Paul Chaplin ===
Chaplin was a retired businessman at the time of the election. He initially sought the Reform Party's nomination in Don Valley West, but lost to John A. Gamble, a former Progressive Conservative Member of Parliament (MP) who was once an executive member of the World Anti-Communist League (Toronto Star, 1 April 1993). Gamble was later expelled from the party. Running in St. Paul's, Chaplin received 5,727 votes (11.20%), finishing third against Liberal candidate Barry Campbell.

== Manitoba ==
=== Portage—Interlake: Don Sawatsky ===
Sawatsky was a businessman from Oak Bluff, dealing in mobile homes. He received 9,801 votes (27.48%), finishing second against Liberal candidate Jon Gerrard.

Sawatsky later served on the Reform Party's national council. In 1996, he argued that most Progressive Conservative Party of Manitoba Members of the Legislative Assembly supported the Reform Party rather than the Progressive Conservative Party at the federal level. Two years later, he said that he could not envision a merger of the two federal parties.

In 2000, Sawatsky nominated Brian Pallister as a federal candidate for the Canadian Alliance party, a successor to Reform.

=== Winnipeg South: Mark Hughes ===
Hughes graduated from the University of Manitoba's Faculty of Agriculture in 1978, and was a farmer for ten years. He also began working as a pastor, and received a degree from Providence Theological Seminary in 1988. He is senior pastor of Church of the Rock Inc. as of 2004, and was a prominent organizer of Winnipeg's March for Jesus (Winnipeg Free Press, 9 June 2000).

Hughes was thirty-six years old during the 1993 election (Winnipeg Free Press, 19 September 1993). He created controversy in the campaign by arguing that a Reform government would give provinces more leeway in approving medical user fees, privately run hospitals and contracting-out of services (Winnipeg Free Press, 7 April 1993). When challenged as to whether or not the Reform party was a vehicle for the religious right, he responded, "Evangelicals feel at home. But there is a broad spectrum of every kind of faith - well, I don't see any Sikhs - but it's far from a right-wing religious party." (Globe and Mail, 28 December 1992). He received 14,822 votes (28.33%), finishing second against Liberal candidate Reg Alcock.

Hughes has been a vocal opponent of gay rights. In 1996, he launched a petition drive against a federal bill including sexual orientation in the Canadian Human Rights Act (Winnipeg Free Press, 8 May 1996). He also spoke against openly gay Winnipeg mayoral candidate Glen Murray in 1998, opposing what he described as "the values behind [Murray's] sexuality and the political agenda of those who share these same values" (Winnipeg Free Press, 13 November 1998).

== Saskatchewan ==
=== Saskatoon—Clark's Crossing: Frederick Wesolowski ===
Wesolowski was born and raised in Saskatoon, Saskatchewan, and holds Bachelor of Arts degree from the University of Saskatchewan and the University of Regina. He is a police officer, and has been a member of the Saskatoon Catholic School Board since 1988.

Wesolowski was first elected to the Catholic School Board in 1988, and has been re-elected in every campaign since them. When campaigning for re-election in 1997, he argued that Catholic students would be at risk "both spiritually and academically" if the Catholic school system were to shift away from a denominationally centred curriculum. (SSP, 20 October 1997). He also called for trustees to address the problem of poverty among students in the system.

While serving as trustee, Wesolowski has also made several unsuccessful bids for a seat on City Council. He targeted the Ward 3 incumbent in 1997 for voting against the police commission budget, and lost by only twenty-five votes. (SSP, 20 and 3 December 1997). He later campaigned for Ward 1 in 2000, seeking increases in the police budget and arguing that the city would have to hire more officers if it wanted to develop plans for community policing (SSP, 23 October 2000). He was again defeated. He has also lost bids for Ward 5 in 1994 and 2003 (SSP, 12 September 2000 + 23 October 2003).

Wesolowski supported affirmative action programs for Saskatoon Catholic teachers in 2001, arguing that past policies had discriminated against women and aboriginals. His initiative was defeated (Regina Leader-Post, 5 September 2001).

He finished a close second against New Democratic Party candidate Chris Axworthy in the 1993 election. He later ran for the Reform Party's nomination in Wanuskewin for the 1997 federal election, but lost to Maurice Vellacott (Saskatoon Star-Phoenix, 17 May 1997).

=== Souris—Moose Mountain: Doug Heimlick ===
Heimlick was defeated by Liberal Bernie Collins by 499 votes.

== Alberta ==
=== Edmonton East: Linda Robertson ===
Robertson was defeated by Liberal Judy Bethel by 203 votes, but pushed NDP incumbent Ross Harvey into third place.

=== Edmonton North: Ron Mix ===
Mix was defeated by Liberal John Loney by 83 votes.

== Candidates in subsequent by-elections ==
=== Brome—Missisquoi: Line Maheux ===
Line Maheux received 517 votes (1.38%), finishing fourth against Liberal Party candidate Denis Paradis. She later became a prominent strategist in the Reform Party and its successors, the Canadian Alliance and the Conservative Party of Canada.
