= New Democratic Party candidates in the 2006 Canadian federal election =

The New Democratic Party fielded a full slate of 308 candidates in the 2006 Canadian federal election. It won 29 seats in the election to remain the fourth-largest party in the House of Commons. Many of the New Democratic Party's candidates have their own biography pages; information about others may be found here.

== Alberta ==
=== Calgary ===
Riding	Candidate's Name	Notes	Residence	Occupation	Votes	%	Rank
Calgary Centre	Brian Pincott	NDP candidate for Calgary Southeast in the 2004 federal election	Calgary		7,227	13.25	3rd
Calgary Centre-North	John Chan	NDP candidate for Calgary North Centre in the 2004 federal election	Calgary	Environmental inspector	9,341	16.78	2nd
Calgary East	Patrick Arnell		Calgary	Businessman	4,338	10.87	3rd
Calgary Northeast	Tyler Ragan		Calgary	Christian minister	3,284	7.84	3rd
Calgary—Nose Hill	Bruce Kaufman		Calgary	Teacher	4,385	7.94	3rd
Calgary Southeast	Eric Leavitt	ANDP candidate for Calgary-Fish Creek in the 2004 Alberta provincial election	Calgary	Teacher	4,584	7.66	3rd
Calgary Southwest	Holly Heffernan	ANDP candidate for Calgary-Glenmore in the 2004 Alberta provincial election	Haysboro, Calgary	Nurse	4,628	8.06	3rd
Calgary West	Teale Phelps Bondaroff		Calgary	Student (University of Calgary)	5,370	8.29	4th

=== Edmonton ===
Riding	Candidate's Name	Notes	Residence	Occupation	Votes	%	Rank
Edmonton Centre	Donna Martyn	ANDP candidate for Edmonton-Riverview in the 2004 Alberta provincial election	Edmonton	Teacher	6,187	10.75	3rd
Edmonton East	Arlene Chapman		Edmonton	Social worker	9,243	18.47	3rd
Edmonton—Leduc	Marty Rybiak		Edmonton	Engineer	7,685	13.78	3rd
Edmonton—Mill Woods—Beaumont	Neal Gray		Edmonton	IT professional	6,749	14.55	3rd
Edmonton—St. Albert	Mike Melymick		Edmonton	Train conductor	8,218	14.02	3rd
Edmonton—Sherwood Park	Laurie Lang	ANDP candidate for Edmonton-Manning in the 2004 Alberta provincial election	Edmonton	Nurse	7,773	14.31	3rd
Edmonton—Spruce Grove	Jason Rockwell		Edmonton	Union official (Health Sciences Association of Alberta)	6,091	10.48	3rd
Edmonton Strathcona	Linda Duncan		Edmonton	Lawyer	17,153	32.51	2nd

=== Rural Alberta ===
Riding	Candidate's Name	Notes	Residence	Occupation	Votes	%	Rank
Crowfoot	Ellen Parker	NDP candidate for Crowfoot in the 2004 federal election	Camrose	Teacher	3,875	7.40	2nd
Fort McMurray—Athabasca	Roland Lefort		Fort McMurray	Union official	4,602	14.59	3rd
Lethbridge	Melanee Thomas	NDP candidate for Lethbridge in the 2004 federal election	Lethbridge	Student (University of Lethbridge)	7,135	13.70	2nd
Macleod	Joyce Thomas	ANDP candidate for Livingstone-Macleod in the 2004 Alberta provincial election NDP candidate for Macleod in the 2004 federal election	Granum	Nurse	3,251	6.54	3rd
Medicine Hat	Wally Regehr		Medicine Hat	Teacher	3,598	8.04	3rd
Peace River	Susan Thompson	NDP candidate for Peace River in the 2004 federal election	Peace River	Journalist	5,427	11.13	3rd
Red Deer	Kelly Bickford		Red Deer	Healthcare worker	5,034	9.94	2nd
Vegreville—Wainwright	Len Legault	NDP candidate for Vegreville—Wainwright in the 2004 federal election ANDP candidate for Battle River-Wainwright in the 2004 Alberta provincial election	Chauvin	Metalworker	4,727	9.24	2nd
Westlock—St. Paul	Peter Opryshko	ANDP candidate for Athabasca-Redwater in the 2004 Alberta provincial election and for Athabasca in the 1979 and 1975 Alberta provincial elections NDP candidate for Athabasca in the 1974 and 1972 federal elections	Boyle	Farmer	4,368	10.03	3rd
Wetaskiwin	Jim Graves	ANDP candidate for Lacombe-Ponoka in the 2004 Alberta provincial election	Lacombe	Engineer	4,441	9.33	2nd
Wild Rose	Shannon Nelles		Airdrie		3,968	7.25	4th
Yellowhead	Noel Lapierre	NDP candidate for Yellowhead in the 2004 and 2000 federal elections ANDP candidate for West Yellowhead in the 2001 Alberta provincial election Member of Hinton Town Council (1978–1983)	Hinton	Millwright	4,712	10.95	2nd

== British Columbia ==
=== British Columbia Interior ===
Riding	Candidate's Name	Notes	Residence	Occupation	Votes	%	Rank
British Columbia Southern Interior	Alex Atamanenko	NDP candidate for British Columbia Southern Interior in the 2004 federal election	Castlegar	Teacher	22,742	48.96	1st
Cariboo—Prince George	Alfred Julian Trudeau		Quesnel	Labourer	10,129	23.20	3rd
Kamloops—Thompson—Cariboo	Michael Crawford		Kamloops	Professor at Thompson Rivers University	16,417	30.78	2nd
Kelowna—Lake Country	Kevin M. Hagglund	President of Communications, Energy and Paperworkers Union Local 823-M	Kelowna	Television producer	9,538	16.64	3rd
Kootenay—Columbia	Brent Bush	NDP candidate for Kootenay—Columbia in the 2004 federal election	Kimberley	Postal worker	10,560	25.88	2nd
Okanagan—Coquihalla	John Harrop		Naramata	Professor at Okanagan University College	9,660	19.20	3rd
Okanagan—Shuswap	Alice Brown	NDP candidate for North Okanagan—Shuswap in the 2004 federal election	Vernon	Electrician	14,551	26.70	2nd
Prince George—Peace River	Malcolm James Crockett		Victoria	Social worker	6,377	17.04	2nd
Skeena—Bulkley Valley	Nathan Cullen	Member of Parliament for Skeena—Bulkley Valley (2004–2019)	Smithers	Small business owner	18,496	48.33	1st

=== Fraser Valley/Lower Mainland ===
Riding	Candidate's Name	Notes	Residence	Occupation	Votes	%	Rank
Abbotsford	Jeffrey Hansen-Carlson	Candidate for Abbotsford City Council in the 2005 Abbotsford municipal election	Abbotsford	Student	8,004	16.98	2nd
Burnaby—Douglas	Bill Siksay	Member of Parliament for Burnaby—Douglas (2004–2011)	Burnaby	Executive assistant	17,323	35.57	1st
Burnaby—New Westminster	Peter Julian	Member of Parliament for Burnaby—New Westminster (2004–2025)	New Westminster		17,391	38.79	1st
Chilliwack—Fraser Canyon	Malcolm James		Lindell Beach	Teacher	10,015	20.89	2nd
Delta—Richmond East	William Jonsson		New Westminster	Student (Douglas College)	7,176	14.73	3rd
Fleetwood—Port Kells	Barry Bell	NDP candidate for Fleetwood—Port Kells in the 2004 federal election	Surrey	Painter	10,961	25.17	3rd
Langley	Angel Claypool		Langley		9,993	18.38	3rd
New Westminster—Coquitlam	Dawn Black	Member of Parliament for New Westminster—Burnaby (1988–1993)	New Westminster	Executive assistant	19,427	38.32	1st
Newton—North Delta	Nancy Clegg	NDP candidate for Newton—North Delta in the 2004 federal election	Surrey	Professor at Kwantlen University College	14,006	31.96	2nd
North Vancouver	Sherry Shaghaghi		North Vancouver	Social worker	7,903	13.20	3rd
Pitt Meadows—Maple Ridge—Mission	Mike Bocking	NDP candidate for Dewdney—Alouette in the 2004 federal election	Mission	Journalist	18,225	34.97	2nd
Port Moody—Westwood—Port Coquitlam	Mary Woo Sims	Former Chief Commissioner of the British Columbia Human Rights Tribunal	Coquitlam	Consultant	11,196	23.07	3rd
Richmond	Neil Smith		Richmond	Technician	6,106	13.98	3rd
South Surrey—White Rock—Cloverdale	Libby Thornton		Surrey	Teacher	9,525	16.85	3rd
Surrey North	Penny Priddy	Member of Surrey City Council (2002–2005); Member of the British Columbia Legislative Assembly for Surrey-Newton (1991–2001)	Surrey	Nurse	16,307	45.69	1st
Vancouver Centre	Svend Robinson	Member of Parliament for Burnaby—Douglas (1997–2004), Burnaby—Kingsway (1988–1997), and Burnaby (1979–1988)	Vancouver	Lawyer	16,374	28.67	2nd
Vancouver East	Libby Davies	Member of Parliament for Vancouver East (1997–2015); Member of Vancouver City Council (1982–1993)	Vancouver	Human resources professional	23,927	56.57	1st
Vancouver Kingsway	Ian Waddell	Member of the British Columbia Legislative Assembly for Vancouver-Fraserview (1996–2001); Member of Parliament for Port Moody—Coquitlam—Port Coquitlam (1988–1993) and Vancouver Kingsway (1979–1988)	Vancouver	Lawyer	15,470	33.51	2nd
Vancouver Quadra	David Askew	NDP candidate for Vancouver Quadra in the 2004 federal election	Vancouver	Chemical engineer	9,379	16.08	3rd
Vancouver South	Bev Meslo	Candidate in the 2003 New Democratic Party leadership election	Vancouver		9,205	21.07	3rd
West Vancouver—Sunshine Coast—Sea to Sky Country	Judith Wilson		Gibsons	Lawyer	12,766	20.06	3rd

=== Vancouver Island ===
Riding	Candidate's Name	Notes	Residence	Occupation	Votes	%	Rank
Esquimalt—Juan de Fuca	Randall Garrison	NDP candidate for Esquimalt—Juan de Fuca in the 2004 federal election	Esquimalt	Professor at Camosun College	18,595	31.29	2nd
Nanaimo—Alberni	Manjeet Uppal		Parksville	Small business owner	20,335	32.23	2nd
Nanaimo—Cowichan	Jean Crowder	Member of Parliament for Nanaimo—Cowichan (2004–2015)	Duncan	Human resources professional	28,558	46.77	1st
Saanich—Gulf Islands	Jennifer Burgis	NDP candidate for Saanich—Gulf Islands in the 2004 federal election	Victoria	Consultant	17,445	26.54	2nd
Vancouver Island North	Catherine J. Bell	NDP candidate for Vancouver Island North in the 2004 federal election	Cumberland	Cook	23,552	41.73	1st
Victoria	Denise Savoie	Member of Victoria City Council (1999–2005)	Victoria	Teacher	23,839	38.46	1st

== Manitoba ==
Riding	Candidate's Name	Notes	Residence	Occupation	Votes	%	Rank
Brandon—Souris	Bob Senff		Oak Lake	Teacher	7,528	20.24	2nd
Charleswood—St. James—Assiniboia	Dennis Kshyk	MB NDP candidate for Kirkfield Park in the 2003 and 1999 Manitoba provincial elections NDP candidate for Charleswood St. James—Assiniboia in the 2000 federal election	Winnipeg	Workers' compensation professional	5,669	12.81	3rd
Churchill	Niki Ashton		Thompson	Lecturer at University College of the North	7,093	28.41	2nd
Dauphin—Swan River—Marquette	Walter Kolisnyk	NDP candidate for Dauphin—Swan River in the 2004 federal election	Minitonas	Farmer	6,221	18.30	2nd
Elmwood—Transcona	Bill Blaikie	Member of Parliament for Elmwood—Transcona (2004–2008), Winnipeg—Transcona (1988–2004); and Winnipeg—Birds Hill (1979–1988)	Winnipeg	United Church minister	16,967	50.85	1st
Kildonan—St. Paul	Evelyn Myskiw		West St. Paul	Administrator	8,193	20.17	3rd
Portage—Lisgar	Daren van den Bussche	NDP candidate for Portage—Lisgar in the 2004 federal election	Portage la Prairie	Firefighter	4,072	11.05	3rd
Provencher	Patrick O'Connor		Pinawa	Computer programmer	5,259	13.71	3rd
Saint Boniface	Mathieu Allard	NDP candidate for Saint Boniface in the 2004 federal election	Winnipeg	Executive assistant	9,311	21.88	3rd
Selkirk—Interlake	Ed Schreyer	Governor General of Canada (1979–1984); Premier of Manitoba (1969–1977); Leader of the New Democratic Party of Manitoba (1969–1979); Member of the Legislative Assembly of Manitoba for Rossmere (1969–1979) and for Brokenhead (1958–1965); Member of Parliament for Selkirk (1968–1979) and for Springfield (1965–1968)	Winnipeg	Chancellor of Brandon University	16,358	36.99	2nd
Winnipeg Centre	Pat Martin	Member of Parliament for Winnipeg Centre (1997–2015)	Winnipeg	Carpenter	13,805	48.43	1st
Winnipeg North	Judy Wasylycia-Leis	Member of Parliament for Winnipeg North (2004–2010) and for Winnipeg North Centre (1997–2004); Member of the Legislative Assembly of Manitoba for St. Johns (1986–1993)	Winnipeg	Policy advisor	15,582	57.18	1st
Winnipeg South	Robert Page		Winnipeg	Teacher	5,743	13.73	3rd
Winnipeg South Centre	Mark Wasyliw		Winnipeg	Lawyer	9,055	21.81	3rd

== New Brunswick ==
Riding	Candidate's Name	Notes	Residence	Occupation	Votes	%	Rank
Acadie—Bathurst	Yvon Godin	Member of Parliament for Acadie—Bathurst (1997–2015)	Bathurst	Union leader (United Steelworkers)	25,195	49.90	1st
Beauséjour	Neil Gardner	NB NDP candidate for Kent South in the 2003 New Brunswick provincial election	Sainte-Marie-de-Kent	Professor at Université de Moncton	7,717	16.67	3rd
Fredericton	John Carty	NDP candidate for Fredericton in the 2004 federal election	Fredericton	Animal shelter manager	9,988	21.25	3rd
Fundy Royal	Rob Moir		Clifton Royal	Professor	7,696	21.09	3rd
Madawaska—Restigouche	Rodolphe Martin		Sainte-Anne-de-Madawaska	Bus driver	8,322	23.04	3rd
Miramichi	Jeannette Manuel-Allain	President of USGE-PSAC Local 60019	South Esk	Parole officer	5,587	16.92	3rd
Moncton—Riverview—Dieppe	David Hackett		Moncton	Consultant / Educator	9,095	18.93	3rd
New Brunswick Southwest	Andrew Graham	NB NDP candidate for Western Charlotte in the 2003 and 1999 New Brunswick provincial elections	Saint John	Carpenter	5,178	15.63	3rd
Saint John	Terry Albright		Saint John	Nurse	6,267	15.64	3rd
Tobique—Mactaquac	Alice Finnamore		Scotch Settlement	Psychologist	4,172	11.49	3rd

== Newfoundland and Labrador ==
Riding	Candidate's Name	Notes	Residence	Occupation	Votes	%	Rank
Avalon	Eugene Conway	Former Mayor of Conception Harbour; NL NDP candidate for Harbour Main in the 2003 Newfoundland and Labrador provincial election Progressive Conservative Party of Newfoundland and Labrador candidate for Harbour Main in the 1999 provincial election	Conception Harbour	Businessman	3,365	9.07	3rd
Bonavista—Gander—Grand Falls—Windsor	Sandra Cooze		Brookfield	Teacher	2,668	6.99	3rd
Humber—St. Barbe—Baie Verte	Holly Pike	NDP candidate for Humber—St. Barbe—Baie Verte in the 2004 federal election	Corner Brook	Professor at the Memorial University of Newfoundland	4,847	14.90	3rd
Labrador	Jacob Edward Larkin		Nain	Vice-principal	1,037	9.08	3rd
Random—Burin—St. George's	Amanda Will	NDP candidate for Labrador in the 2000 federal election NL NDP candidate for Virginia Waters in the 1999 Newfoundland and Labrador provincial election	Portugal Cove–St. Philip's	Communications professional	3,702	12.34	3rd
St. John's East	Mike Kehoe	NDP candidate for Avalon in the 2004 federal election NL NDP candidate for Topsail in the 2003 Newfoundland and Labrador provincial election	Paradise		7,190	17.52	3rd
St. John's South—Mount Pearl	Peg Norman	NDP candidate for St. John's South—Mount Pearl in the 2004 federal election	St. John's	Healthcare manager	8,073	21.67	3rd

== Nova Scotia ==
Riding	Candidate's Name	Notes	Residence	Occupation	Votes	%	Rank
Cape Breton—Canso	Hector Morrison		Glace Bay	Miner	8,111	20.14	3rd
Central Nova	Alexis MacDonald	NDP candidate for Central Nova in the 2004 federal election			13,861	32.89	2nd
Cumberland—Colchester—Musquodoboit Valley	Margaret Sagar	NDP candidate for North Nova in the 2004 federal election	Truro	United Church minister	8,944	20.74	3rd
Dartmouth—Cole Harbour	Peter Mancini	Member of Parliament for Sydney—Victoria (1997–2000)	Dartmouth	Lawyer	14,612	32.50	2nd
Halifax	Alexa McDonough	Member of Parliament for Halifax (1997–2008); Leader of the New Democratic Party (1995–2003); Leader of the Nova Scotia New Democratic Party (1980–1994); Member of the Nova Scotia House of Assembly for Halifax Fairview (1993–1995); Member of the Nova Scotia House of Assembly for Halifax Chebucto (1981–1993)	Halifax	Social worker	23,420	46.88	1st
Halifax West	Alan Hill	President of Canadian Union of Public Employees Local 3912	Halifax	Lecturer at Dalhousie University	10,798	24.43	2nd
Kings—Hants	Mary DeWolfe	NS NDP candidate for Kings South in the 1999 and 1998 Nova Scotia provincial elections	Wolfville	Small business owner	8,138	19.02	3rd
Sackville—Eastern Shore	Peter Stoffer	Member of Parliament for Sackville—Eastern Shore (2004–2015)	Windsor Junction	Airline employee	22,848	52.95	1st
South Shore—St. Margaret's	Gordon Earle	Member of Parliament for Halifax West (1997–2000)	Upper Tantallon	Civil servant	11,689	28.51	2nd
Sydney—Victoria	John Hugh Edwards	NDP candidate for Sydney—Victoria in the 2004 federal election	Ross Ferry	Instructor at St. Francis Xavier University	11,587	28.50	2nd
West Nova	Arthur Bull	NDP candidate for West Nova in the 2004 federal election	Digby	Educator	8,512	18.84	3rd

== Ontario ==
=== Central Ontario ===
Riding	Candidate's Name	Notes	Residence	Occupation	Votes	%	Rank
Barrie	Peter Bursztyn	NDP candidate for Barrie in the 2004 federal election	Barrie	Chemist / Professor at Georgian College and Laurentian University	6,978	12.18	3rd
Dufferin—Caledon	Chris Marquis		Kilbride	Student (University of Guelph)	5,983	12.13	3rd
Durham	Bruce Rogers	NDP candidate for Clarington—Scugog—Uxbridge in the 2004 federal election; for Oshawa in the 2000 federal election; and for Parkdale in the 1968 federal election	Seagrave	Broadcast journalist	9,946	17.26	3rd
Haliburton—Kawartha Lakes—Brock	Anne MacDermid		Sunderland	Theatre manager	10,340	17.22	3rd
Newmarket—Aurora	Ed Chudak	NDP candidate for Newmarket—Aurora in the 2004 federal election	Newmarket	Union official (Ontario English Catholic Teachers' Association)	5,639	9.59	3rd
Northumberland—Quinte West	Russ Christianson	NDP candidate for Northumberland—Quinte West in the 2004 federal election	Campbellford	Businessman	5,639	9.59	3rd
Peterborough	Linda Slavin	NDP candidate for Peterborough in the 2004 and 1984 federal elections ONDP candidate for Peterborough in the 1987 and 1985 Ontario provincial elections	Peterborough	Teacher	16,286	25.68	3rd
Simcoe—Grey	Katy Austin		Elmvale	Teacher	6,784	11.20	3rd
Simcoe North	Jen Hill	NDP candidate for Simcoe North in the 2004 federal election	Orillia	Small business owner	8,132	14.13	3rd
York—Simcoe	Sylvia Gerl	NDP candidate for York—Simcoe in the 2004 federal election ONDP candidate for York North in the 2003 Ontario provincial election	Keswick	Women's shelter worker	7,139	13.32	3rd

=== Eastern Ontario/Ottawa ===
Riding	Candidate's Name	Notes	Residence	Occupation	Votes	%	Rank
Carleton—Mississippi Mills	Tasha Bridgen		Kanata	Journalist	8,677	12.50	3rd
Glengarry—Prescott—Russell	Jo-Ann Fennessey		Bourget	Consultant	7,049	12.74	3rd
Kingston and the Islands	Rob Hutchison	NDP candidate for Kingston and the Islands in the 2004 federal election Candidate for Kingston City Council in the 1997 Kingston municipal election	Kingston	Public housing executive	11,946	19.19	3rd
Lanark—Frontenac—Lennox and Addington	Helen Forsey	Daughter of Eugene Forsey	Ompah	Agronomist	9,604	16.15	3rd
Leeds—Grenville	Steve Armstrong	NDP candidate for Leeds—Grenville in the 2004 federal election ONDP candidate for Leeds—Grenville in the 2003 Ontario provincial election President of Communications, Energy and Paperworkers Union Local 28-O	Brockville	Chemical worker	7,945	15.26	3rd
Nepean—Carleton	Laurel Gibbons		Greely, Ottawa	Businesswoman	8,274	11.51	3rd
Ottawa Centre	Paul Dewar	Son of Marion Dewar	Ottawa	Teacher	24,609	36.94	1st
Ottawa—Orléans	Mark Andrew Leahy		Ottawa	Small business owner	9,354	15.09	3rd
Ottawa South	Henri Sader		Heron Park, Ottawa	Economist / Professor	8,138	13.23	3rd
Ottawa West—Nepean	Marlene Rivier	President of Ontario Public Service Employees Union Local 479; NDP candidate for Ottawa West—Nepean in the 2004 federal election ONDP candidate for Ottawa West—Nepean in the 2003 Ontario provincial election	Ottawa	Psychologist / Union leader	9,626	16.19	3rd
Prince Edward—Hastings	Michael McMahon		Belleville	Teacher	8,474	14.84	3rd
Renfrew—Nipissing—Pembroke	Sue McSheffrey	NDP candidate for Renfrew—Nipissing—Pembroke in the 2004 federal election	Renfrew	Physiotherapist	6,509	12.55	3rd
Stormont—Dundas—South Glengarry	Elaine MacDonald	NDP candidate for Stormont—Dundas—South Glengarry in the 2004 federal election	Cornwall	Teacher	6,892	13.46	3rd

=== Greater Toronto Area ===
Riding	Candidate's Name	Notes	Residence	Occupation	Votes	%	Rank
Ajax—Pickering	Kevin Modeste	NDP candidate for Ajax—Pickering in the 2004 federal election	Pickering	Businessman	6,655	12.82	3rd
Beaches—East York	Marilyn Churley	Member of the Legislative Assembly of Ontario for Toronto—Danforth (1999–2005) and Riverdale (1990–1999); Member of Toronto City Council for Ward 8 (Riverdale) (1988–1990)	Toronto	Non-profit director	17,900	34.96	2nd
Bramalea—Gore—Malton	Cesar Martello	NDP candidate for Etobicoke North in the 2004 federal election ONDP candidate for Bramalea—Gore—Malton—Springdale in the 2003 Ontario provincial election	Brampton	Student (York University)	6,343	12.88	3rd
Brampton—Springdale	Anna Mather		Brampton	Public relations professional	8,345	17.72	3rd
Brampton West	Jagtar Singh Shergill		Brampton	Small business owner	6,310	11.07	3rd
Burlington	David Laird	NDP candidate for Burlington in the 2004 federal election ONDP candidate for Burlington in the 2003 Ontario provincial election	Burlington	Child protection worker	8,090	12.44	3rd
Davenport	Gord Perks		Toronto	Professor at the University of Toronto	12,681	32.61	2nd
Don Valley East	Richard Alan Hennick	Green Party of British Columbia candidate for Maple Ridge-Pitt Meadows in the 1996 British Columbia provincial election Green Party candidate for Mission—Port Moody in the 1984 federal election	North York	Technician	5,597	12.89	3rd
Don Valley West	David Thomas	NDP candidate for Don Valley West in the 2004 federal election	North York	Financial professional	4,902	9.11	3rd
Eglinton—Lawrence	Maurganne Mooney		Toronto	Legal aid worker	5,660	11.49	3rd
Etobicoke Centre	Cynthia Cameron		Toronto	Journalist	5,426	9.64	3rd
Etobicoke—Lakeshore	Liam McHugh-Russell		Toronto	Student	8,685	15.57	3rd
Etobicoke North	Ali Naqvi	ONDP candidate for Don Valley West in the 2003 Ontario provincial election	Toronto	Consultant	3,820	10.61	3rd
Halton	Anwar Naqvi	NDP candidate for Halton in the 2004 federal election ONDP candidate for Oakville in the 2003 Ontario provincial election	Oakville	Lawyer	6,114	8.83	3rd
Markham—Unionville	Janice Hagan	NDP candidate for Markham—Unionville in the 2004 federal election and for Markham in the 2000 federal election ONDP candidate for Markham in the 2003 and 1999 Ontario provincial elections	Markham	Teacher	4,257	8.04	3rd
Mississauga—Brampton South	Nirvan Balkissoon		Mississauga	Businessman	5,521	10.88	3rd
Mississauga East—Cooksville	Jim Gill	NDP candidate for Mississauga East—Cooksville in the 2004 federal election	Brampton	Clerk	5,180	11.37	3rd
Mississauga—Erindale	Rupinder Brar		Mississauga	Professor at the University of Ontario Institute of Technology	6,644	11.09	3rd
Mississauga South	Mark de Pelham	Marijuana Party candidate for Calgary Southwest in the 2004 federal election	Mississauga		5,607	10.76	3rd
Mississauga—Streetsville	James Caron		Mississauga	Civil servant	6,929	13.31	3rd
Oak Ridges—Markham	Pamela Courtot	NDP candidate for Oak Ridges—Markham in the 2004 federal election ONDP candidate for Oak Ridges in the 2003 Ontario provincial election	Stouffville	Small business owner	7,367	9.88	3rd
Oakville	Tina Agrell		Oakville	Teacher	5,815	9.74	3rd
Oshawa	Sid Ryan	President of CUPE Ontario (1992–2009); ONDP candidate for Oshawa in the 2003 Ontario provincial election	Whitby	Union leader (Canadian Union of Public Employees)	17,905	33.47	2nd
Parkdale—High Park	Peggy Nash	NDP candidate for Parkdale—High Park in the 2004 federal election	Toronto	Union official (Canadian Auto Workers)	20,790	40.41	1st
Pickering—Scarborough East	Gary Dale	NDP candidate for Pickering—Scarborough East in the 2004 federal election ONDP candidate for Scarborough East in the 2003 Ontario provincial election	Toronto	Consultant	6,090	11.57	3rd
Richmond Hill	Wess Dowsett		Richmond Hill	Union official (United Steelworkers)	5,176	9.96	3rd
Scarborough—Agincourt	David Robertson		Toronto	Teacher	4,969	11.08	3rd
Scarborough Centre	Dorothy Laxton		Scarborough, Toronto	Retail worker	5,884	13.96	3rd
Scarborough—Guildwood	Peter Campbell		Scarborough, Toronto	IT professional	5,847	14.23	3rd
Scarborough—Rouge River	Andrew Brett		Toronto	Non-profit worker	4,972	10.77	3rd
Scarborough Southwest	Dan Harris	NDP candidate for Scarborough Southwest in the 2004 and 2000 federal elections	Toronto	IT professional	9,626	23.10	3rd
St. Paul's	Paul Summerville	Great-nephew of Donald Dean Summerville	Toronto	Economist	11,189	19.20	3rd
Thornhill	Simon Strelchik		Thornhill	Charity director	4,405	7.81	3rd
Toronto Centre	Michael Shapcott	NDP candidate for Toronto Centre in the 2004 federal election	Toronto	Analyst	14,036	23.74	2nd
Toronto—Danforth	Jack Layton	Leader of the New Democratic Party (2004–2011); Member of Toronto City Council (1994–2003 & 1982–1991)	Toronto	Professor	24,412	48.42	1st
Trinity—Spadina	Olivia Chow	Member of Toronto City Council for Trinity—Spadina (2000–2006) and Downtown (1992–2000); Toronto Board of Education Trustee (1985–1991)	Toronto	Artist / Professor at George Brown College	28,748	46.03	1st
Vaughan	Yurgo Alexopoulos		Toronto	Student	5,114	8.26	3rd
Whitby—Oshawa	Maret Sadem-Thompson	NDP candidate for Whitby—Oshawa in the 2004 federal election	Whitby	Principal	8,716	13.05	3rd
Willowdale	Rochelle Carnegie		Toronto	Office manager	6,297	11.36	3rd
York Centre	Marco Iacampo		Toronto	Executive assistant	5,813	13.62	3rd
York South—Weston	Paul Ferreira	NDP candidate for York South—Weston in the 2004 federal election and for Brampton Centre in the 1997 federal election	Toronto	Public relations professional	8,525	21.27	2nd
York West	Sandra Romano Anthony	NDP candidate for York West in the 2004 federal election	Toronto	Nutritionist	4,724	14.07	3rd

=== Hamilton/Niagara ===
Riding	Candidate's Name	Notes	Residence	Occupation	Votes	%	Rank
Ancaster—Dundas—Flamborough—Westdale	Gordon Guyatt	NDP candidate for Ancaster—Dundas—Flamborough—Westdale in the 2004 federal election and for Ancaster—Dundas—Flamborough—Aldershot in the 2000 federal election	Dundas	Physician / Professor at McMaster University	13,376	21.32	3rd
Hamilton Centre	David Christopherson	Member of Parliament for Hamilton Centre (2004–2019); Member of Legislative Assembly of Ontario for Hamilton West (1999–2003) and Hamilton Centre (1990–1999); Member of Hamilton City Council for Ward 4 (1985–1990)	Hamilton	Union official (United Auto Workers)	24,503	51.29	1st
Hamilton East—Stoney Creek	Wayne Marston	NDP candidate for Hamilton East in the 1997 and 1993 federal elections and the 1996 Hamilton East federal by-election	Hamilton	Technician	19,346	36.03	1st
Hamilton Mountain	Chris Charlton	NDP candidate for Hamilton Mountain in the 2004 and 1997 federal elections ONDP candidate for Hamilton Mountain in the 2003 and 1999 Ontario provincial elections	Hamilton	Advisor	21,970	37.43	1st
Niagara Falls	Wayne Gates	NDP candidate for Niagara Falls in the 2004 federal election	Niagara Falls	Union leader (Unifor)	12,209	20.98	3rd
Niagara West—Glanbrook	Dave Heatley	NDP candidate for Niagara West—Glanbrook in the 2004 federal election	Hamilton	Industrial worker	9,251	16.02	3rd
St. Catharines	Jeff Burch	ONDP candidate for St. Catharines in the 1995 Ontario provincial election	St. Catharines	Union official (Service Employees International Union)	11,848	20.49	3rd
Welland	Jody Di Bartolomeo	NDP candidate for Welland in the 2004 federal election and for Erie—Lincoln in the 2000 federal election	Port Colborne	Occupational safety and health professional	17,492	30.66	2nd

=== Northern Ontario ===
Riding	Candidate's Name	Notes	Residence	Occupation	Votes	%	Rank
Algoma—Manitoulin—Kapuskasing	Carol Hughes	NDP candidate for Algoma—Manitoulin—Kapuskasing in the 2004 federal election	Hanmer	Union official (Canadian Labour Congress)	13,244	34.51	2nd
Kenora	Susan Barclay	NDP candidate for Kenora in the 2004 federal election and for Kenora—Rainy River in the 2000 federal election	Sioux Lookout	Anglican priest	8,149	29.95	3rd
Nickel Belt	Claude Gravelle	NDP candidate for Nickel Belt in the 2004 federal election Member of Rayside-Balfour Town Council (1997–2000)	Chelmsford	Machinist	17,668	38.70	2nd
Nipissing—Timiskaming	Dave Fluri	NDP candidate for Nipissing—Timiskaming in the 2004 federal election	Sturgeon Falls	Biologist	8,268	17.27	3rd
Parry Sound—Muskoka	Jo-Anne Boulding	NDP candidate for Parry Sound—Muskoka in the 2004 federal election ONDP candidate for Parry Sound—Muskoka in the 2003 Ontario provincial election	Bracebridge	Lawyer	5,472	11.85	3rd
Sault Ste. Marie	Tony Martin	Member of Parliament for Sault Ste. Marie (2004–2011); Member of the Legislative Assembly of Ontario for Sault Ste. Marie (1990–2003)	Sault Ste. Marie		17,979	38.88	1st
Sudbury	Gerry McIntaggart	Member of Sudbury City Council (1991–2003)	Sudbury	Logistics professional	15,225	31.95	2nd
Thunder Bay—Rainy River	John Rafferty	NDP candidate for Thunder Bay—Rainy River in the 2004 federal election and Thunder Bay—Superior North in the 2000 federal election ONDP candidate for Thunder Bay—Atikokan in the 2003 Ontario provincial election	Fort Frances	Radio broadcaster	12,862	33.42	2nd
Thunder Bay—Superior North	Bruce Hyer	NDP candidate for Thunder Bay—Superior North in the 2004 federal election	Armstrong	Ecologist	13,601	34.96	2nd
Timmins–James Bay	Charlie Angus	Member of Parliament for Timmins–James Bay (2004–2025)	Cobalt	Musician / Writer	19,195	50.58	1st

=== Southwestern Ontario ===
Riding	Candidate's Name	Notes	Residence	Occupation	Votes	%	Rank
Brant	Lynn Bowering	NDP candidate for Brant in the 2004 federal election	Brantford	Consultant	12,713	21.28	3rd
Bruce—Grey—Owen Sound	Jill McIllwraith	President of Ontario Public Service Employees Union Local 260	Markdale	Nurse	5,918	11.34	4th
Cambridge	Donna Reid		Cambridge	Teacher	9,794	16.95	3rd
Chatham-Kent—Essex	Kathleen Kevany	NDP candidate for Chatham-Kent—Essex in the 2004 federal election	Chatham	Professor at the University of Western Ontario	10,875	22.36	3rd
Elgin—Middlesex—London	Tim McCallum	NDP candidate for Elgin—Middlesex—London in the 2004 federal election	Dutton	Industrial worker	9,873	19.24	3rd
Essex	Taras Natyshak		Belle River	Union official (Laborers' International Union of North America)	12,993	22.70	3rd
Guelph	Phil Allt	NDP candidate for Guelph in the 2004 federal election	Guelph	Small business owner	13,561	22.00	3rd
Haldimand—Norfolk	Valya Roberts		Hamilton	Social services director	6,858	12.80	3rd
Huron—Bruce	Grant Robertson	NDP candidate for Huron—Bruce in the 2004 federal election ONDP candidate for Huron—Bruce in the 2003 Ontario provincial election	Paisley	Ontario director of the National Farmers Union	8,696	16.30	3rd
Kitchener Centre	Richard Walsh-Bowers	NDP candidate for Kitchener Centre in the 2004 federal election and for Kitchener—Waterloo in the 2000 federal election ONDP candidate for Waterloo—Wellington in the 2003 and 1999 Ontario provincial elections	Wallenstein	Professor at Wilfrid Laurier University	9,253	18.43	3rd
Kitchener—Conestoga	Len Carter	NDP candidate for Kitchener—Conestoga in the 2004 federal election	Kitchener	Small business owner	7,445	14.89	3rd
Kitchener—Waterloo	Edwin Laryea	NDP candidate for Kitchener—Waterloo in the 2004 federal election	Waterloo	Principal	11,889	17.89	3rd
Lambton—Kent—Middlesex	Kevin Blake	NDP candidate for Lambton—Kent—Middlesex in the 2004 federal election Member of Wallaceburg Town Council (1991–1994)	Wallaceburg		9,330	17.19	3rd
London—Fanshawe	Irene Mathyssen	Member of the Legislative Assembly of Ontario for Middlesex (1990–1995)	Ilderton	Teacher	16,067	34.51	1st
London North Centre	Stephen Maynard		London	Student (University of Western Ontario)	14,271	23.75	3rd
London West	Gina Barber	NDP candidate for London West in the 2004 federal election	London	Teacher	13,056	21.39	3rd
Oxford	Zoé Kunschner	NDP candidate for Oxford in the 2004 federal election	Ingersoll	Small business owner	8,639	17.38	3rd
Perth—Wellington	Keith Dinicol		Stratford	Actor	8,876	18.61	3rd
Sarnia—Lambton	Greg Agar	NDP candidate for Sarnia—Lambton in the 2004 federal election	Courtright	Chemical worker	10,673	20.02	3rd
Wellington—Halton Hills	Noel Duignan	Member of the Legislative Assembly of Ontario for Halton North (1990–1995)	Georgetown	Mediator	6,785	12.32	3rd
Windsor—Tecumseh	Joe Comartin	Member of Parliament for Windsor—Tecumseh (2004–2015) Windsor—St. Clair (2000–2004)	Windsor	Lawyer	22,646	44.63	1st
Windsor West	Brian Masse	Member of Parliament for Windsor West (2002–2025); Member of Windsor City Council (1997–2002)	Windsor	Disability support worker	23,608	49.49	1st

== Prince Edward Island ==
Riding	Candidate's Name	Notes	Residence	Occupation	Votes	%	Rank
Cardigan	Edith Perry	PEI NDP candidate for Murray River-Gaspereaux in the 2003 Prince Edward Island provincial election	Millview		1,535	7.48	3rd
Charlottetown	Brian Pollard		Charlottetown	Filmmaker	2,126	11.12	3rd
Egmont	Regena Kaye Russell		O'Leary	Lawyer	1,847	9.55	3rd
Malpeque	George Marshall		Cornwall	Teacher	1,983	10.24	3rd

== Quebec ==
=== Central Quebec ===
Riding	Candidate's Name	Notes	Residence	Occupation	Votes	%	Rank
Bas-Richelieu—Nicolet—Bécancour	Marie-Claude Roberge Cartier		Saint-Jean-sur-Richelieu	Artist	2,248	4.53	4th
Berthier—Maskinongé	Anne-Marie Aubert		Montreal	Publisher	3,319	6.15	4th
Joliette	Jacques Trudeau	NDP candidate for Joliette in the 2004 and 1997 federal elections	Crabtree	Student (Université de Montréal)	2,745	5.19	4th
Lotbinière—Chutes-de-la-Chaudière	Raymond Côté		Quebec City	Civil servant	3,529	6.79	3rd
Montcalm	Nancy Leclerc		Montreal	Professor	3,766	6.71	4th
Portneuf—Jacques-Cartier	Jean-Marie Fiset	NDP candidate for Québec in the 2004, 2000, and 1997 federal elections and for Portneuf in the 1988 federal election NDPQ candidate for Montmorency in the 1994 Quebec provincial election and for Portneuf in the 1993 Portneuf provincial by-election	Quebec City	Hospital employee	1,956	3.87	5th
Repentigny	Réjean Bellemare		Le Gardeur, Repentigny	Businessman	4,337	7.74	4th
Saint-Maurice—Champlain	Claude Larocque		Shawinigan	Water treatment professional	3,684	7.59	4th
Trois-Rivières	Geneviève Boivin		Trois-Rivières	Therapist	3,774	7.75	4th

=== Eastern Townships/Southern Quebec ===
Riding	Candidate's Name	Notes	Residence	Occupation	Votes	%	Rank
Beauce	Cléo Chartier		Montreal	Travel agent	1,405	2.55	4th
Beauharnois—Salaberry	Cynthia Roy		Salaberry-de-Valleyfield	Student	4,163	7.56	4th
Brome—Missisquoi	Josianne Jetté		Sherbrooke	Student	2,839	5.85	4th
Châteauguay—Saint-Constant	Ehsan Mohammadian		Saint-Constant	Manager	2,865	5.21	4th
Compton—Stanstead	Stéphane Bürgi		Rock Forest	Student	3,099	6.22	4th
Drummond	François Choquette		Drummondville	Teacher	2,870	6.32	4th
Mégantic—L'Érable	Isabelle Tremblay	NDP candidate for Roberval in the 2004 federal election	Gatineau	Student	1,836	3.89	4th
Richmond—Arthabaska	Isabelle Maguire		Sherbrooke	Student (Bishop's University)	2,507	4.91	4th
Saint-Hyacinthe—Bagot	Joëlle Chevrier		Montreal	Manager	2,723	5.48	4th
Saint-Jean	Mathieu-Gilles Lanciault		Montreal	Public relations professional	3,622	6.96	4th
Shefford	Paula Maundcote		Granby	Teacher	2,431	4.73	4th
Sherbrooke	Martin Plaisance		Sherbrooke	Nephrologist	4,646	8.95	4th

=== Greater Montreal ===
Riding	Candidate's Name	Notes	Residence	Occupation	Votes	%	Rank
Ahuntsic	Caroline Desrosiers		Montreal	Student (Université de Montréal)	3,948	7.91	4th
Bourassa	Stefano Saykaly		Saint-Leonard, Montreal	Clerk	2,237	5.19	4th
Brossard—La Prairie	Robert Nicolas	Conservative Party candidate for Brossard—La Prairie in the 2004 federal election	Brossard	IT professional	4,301	7.46	4th
Chambly—Borduas	Alain Dubois			Social worker	5,167	8.39	4th
Hochelaga	David-Roger Gagnon		Montreal	United Church employee	4,101	8.91	4th
Honoré-Mercier	François Pilon		Montreal	Civil servant	3,191	6.22	4th
Jeanne-Le Ber	Matthew McLauchlin	NDP candidate for Verdun—Saint-Henri—Saint-Paul—Pointe-Saint-Charles in the 2002 by-election and 2000 federal election	Montreal	Translator	4,621	9.19	4th
La Pointe-de-l'Île	Nicolas Tremblay		Anjou, Montreal	Student (Cégep du Vieux Montréal)	3,407	7.01	4th
Lac-Saint-Louis	Daniel Quinn		Pointe-Claire	Student	5,702	10.73	3rd
LaSalle—Émard	Russ Johnson		Montreal	Businessman	2,805	5.97	4th
Laurier—Sainte-Marie	François Grégoire	NDP candidate for Laurier—Sainte-Marie in the 2004 federal election	Montreal	Professor at Cégep Édouard-Montpetit	8,165	16.68	2nd
Longueuil—Pierre-Boucher	Philippe Haese		Longueuil	Student (Université de Montréal)	4,273	8.60	4th
Mount Royal	Nicolas R. Thibodeau		Mount Royal	Student	2,479	6.70	3rd
Notre-Dame-de-Grâce—Lachine	Peter Deslauriers		Montréal-Ouest	Professor at Dawson College	5,455	11.82	4th
Outremont	Léo-Paul Lauzon		Montreal	Accountant	6,984	17.20	3rd
Papineau	Marc Hasbani		Montreal	Student (Université du Québec à Montréal)	3,358	7.70	4th
Pierrefonds—Dollard	Shameem Siddiqui		Dollard-des-Ormeaux	Quality control worker	3,664	7.68	3rd
Rivière-des-Mille-Îles	Francis Chartrand		Deux-Montagnes		3,418	7.01	4th
Rosemont—La Petite-Patrie	Chantal Reeves		Montreal	Civil servant	6,051	11.55	3rd
Saint-Bruno—Saint-Hubert	Marie Henretta		Mont-Saint-Hilaire	Teacher	4,359	8.27	4th
Saint-Lambert	Ronaldo Garcia		Longueuil	Teacher	3,404	7.36	4th
Saint-Laurent—Cartierville	Liz Elder		Saint-Laurent, Montreal		3,279	7.72	4th
Saint-Léonard—Saint-Michel	Laura Colella	NDP candidate for Saint-Léonard—Saint-Michel in the 2004 federal election	Saint-Leonard, Montreal	Lawyer	2,831	6.83	4th
Terrebonne—Blainville	Michel Le Clair		Terrebonne	Telecommunications worker	3,829	7.50	4th
Vaudreuil-Soulanges	Bert Markgraf	NDP candidate for Vaudreuil-Soulanges in the 2004 federal election	Hudson	Small business owner	3,468	5.55	4th
Verchères—Les Patriotes	Simon Vallée	NDP candidate for Verchères—Les Patriotes in the 2004 federal election	Boucherville	Student (Polytechnique Montréal)	4,293	8.15	4th
Westmount—Ville-Marie	Eric Wilson Steedman	NDP candidate for Westmount—Ville-Marie in the 2004 federal election and for Gaspé in the 1993 federal election	Montreal	Investment manager	6,356	15.37	3rd

=== Northern Quebec ===
Riding	Candidate's Name	Notes	Residence	Occupation	Votes	%	Rank
Abitibi—Baie-James—Nunavik—Eeyou	Dominique Vaillancourt			Administrator	1,810	6.05	4th
Abitibi—Témiscamingue	Christine Moore		La Reine	Nurse	4,022	8.54	4th
Chicoutimi—Le Fjord	Éric Dubois		Chicoutimi		2,571	5.15	4th
Jonquière—Alma	Martin Bertrand		Alma	Professor at Cégep de Jonquière	2,028	3.87	3rd
Manicouagan	Pierre Ducasse	Candidate in the 2003 New Democratic Party leadership election NDP candidate for Manicouagan in the 2004 and 1997 federal elections	Sept-Îles	Economic development director	4,657	12.79	4th
Roberval—Lac-Saint-Jean	François Privé		Alma	Professor at Collège d'Alma	2,151	5.53	4th

=== Quebec City/Gaspe/Eastern Quebec ===
Riding	Candidate's Name	Notes	Residence	Occupation	Votes	%	Rank
Beauport—Limoilou	Simon-Pierre Beaudet		Quebec City		3,917	7.98	4th
Charlesbourg—Haute-Saint-Charles	Isabelle Martineau		Sainte-Foy, Quebec City		3,084	6.30	4th
Gaspésie—Les Îles-de-la-Madeleine	Sylvie Dauphinais		Laval	Teacher	1,225	2.96	4th
Haute-Gaspésie—La Mitis—Matane—Matapédia	Stéphane Ricard		Matane	Small business owner	2,116	6.20	4th
Lévis—Bellechasse	Eric Boucher		Quebec City	Trainer	2,590	4.63	5th
Louis-Hébert	Denis Blanchette		Cap-Rouge, Quebec City	Civil servant	5,351	9.07	4th
Louis-Saint-Laurent	Robert Donnelly		Quebec City	Teacher	2,848	5.74	4th
Montmagny—L'Islet—Kamouraska—Rivière-du-Loup	Myriam Leblanc		Rivière-du-Loup	Student	2,107	4.58	4th
Montmorency—Charlevoix—Haute-Côte-Nord	Martin Cauchon		Quebec City	Computer programmer	2,896	6.42	4th
Québec	Michaël Lessard		Quebec City	Public relations professional	4,629	9.22	4th
Rimouski-Neigette—Témiscouata—Les Basques	Guy Caron	NDP candidate for Rimouski-Neigette—Témiscouata—Les Basques in the 2004 federal election	Rimouski	Economist / Union official (Communications, Energy and Paperworkers Union of Canada)	4,186	9.80	4th

=== Western Quebec/Laurentides/Outaouais ===
Riding	Candidate's Name	Notes	Residence	Occupation	Votes	%	Rank
Argenteuil—Papineau—Mirabel	Alain Senécal		Mirabel	Telecommunications worker	3,466	6.49	4th
Gatineau	Anne Levesque		Ottawa	Student (University of Ottawa)	5,354	9.96	4th
Hull—Aylmer	Pierre Laliberté	NDP candidate for Hull—Aylmer in the 2004 federal election	Gatineau	Economist	8,334	15.49	4th
Laurentides—Labelle	Rose-Aimée Auclair		Montreal	Student	3,382	6.45	4th
Pontiac	Céline Brault		Chelsea	Teacher	4,759	9.98	4th
Rivière-du-Nord	Simon Bernier		Saint-Jérôme	Helicopter technician	3,393	7.21	4th

== Saskatchewan ==
Riding	Candidate's Name	Notes	Residence	Occupation	Votes	%	Rank
Battlefords—Lloydminster	Elgin Wayne Wyatt		North Battleford	Teacher	4,829	15.80	2nd
Blackstrap	Don Kossick	NDP candidate for Blackstrap in the 2004 federal election	Saskatoon	Consultant	12,376	30.57	2nd
Cypress Hills—Grasslands	Mike Eason		Moose Jaw	Quality control worker	5,076	16.84	2nd
Desnethé—Missinippi—Churchill River	Anita Jackson		La Ronge	Executive assistant	3,787	15.37	3rd
Palliser	Jo-Anne Dusel		Moose Jaw	Homeless shelter worker	11,460	33.05	2nd
Prince Albert	Valerie Mushinski		Nipawin	Nurse	7,562	23.84	2nd
Regina—Lumsden—Lake Centre	Moe Kovatch	NDP candidate for Regina—Lumsden—Lake Centre in the 2004 federal election	Regina	Small business owner	9,467	28.15	2nd
Regina—Qu'Appelle	Lorne Nystrom	Member of Parliament for Regina—Qu'Appelle (1997–2004); Member of Parliament for Yorkton—Melville (1968–1993)	Regina	Consultant	10,041	32.45	2nd
Saskatoon—Humboldt	Andrew Mason		Saskatoon	Lawyer	10,975	29.45	2nd
Saskatoon—Rosetown—Biggar	Nettie Wiebe	President of the National Farmers Union (1995–1998); Candidate in the 2001 Saskatchewan New Democratic Party leadership election	Delisle	Professor	11,412	38.98	2nd
Saskatoon—Wanuskewin	Jim Maddin	Mayor of Saskatoon (2000–2003); Member of Saskatoon City Council for Ward 1 (1997–2000)	Saskatoon	Police officer	7,939	22.09	3rd
Souris—Moose Mountain	Michael Haukeness		Estevan	Farmer	4,284	13.96	3rd
Wascana	Helen Yum		Regina	Lawyer	5,880	14.73	3rd
Yorkton—Melville	Jason Dennison		Regina	Small business owner	6,165	18.87	2nd

== The Territories ==
Riding	Candidate's Name	Notes	Residence	Occupation	Votes	%	Rank
Nunavut	Bill Riddell	NDP candidate for Nunavut in the 2004 federal election	Iqaluit	Professor at Nunavut Arctic College/Justice of the peace	1,576	17.15	3rd
Western Arctic	Dennis Bevington	NDP candidate for Western Arctic in the 2004 and 2000 federal elections Mayor of Fort Smith (1988–1997)	Fort Smith	Small business owner	6,802	42.16	1st
Yukon	Pam Boyde	NDP candidate for Yukon in the 2004 federal election	Whitehorse	Consultant	3,366	23.85	2nd
