= Maurice Vellacott =

Canadian politician

Member of Parliament for Saskatoon—Wanuskewin as Wanuskewin, 1997–2000
- In office June 2, 1997 – August 4, 2015
- Preceded by: new riding
- Succeeded by: Kelly Block

Chair of the Standing Committee on Aboriginal Affairs
- In office May 1, 2006 – May 9, 2006
- Minister: Jim Prentice
- Preceded by: Lloyd St. Amand
- Succeeded by: Colin Mayes

Personal details
- Born: September 29, 1955 (age 70) Wadena, Saskatchewan, Canada
- Party: Conservative
- Other political affiliations: Reform (1997–2000); Canadian Alliance (2000–2003)
- Spouse: Mary Vellacott

Maurice Vellacott (born September 29, 1955) is a former Canadian politician from Saskatchewan. He served in the House of Commons of Canada from 1997 to 2015 as the member of Parliament (MP) for the riding of Saskatoon—Wanuskewin from 1997 to 2015 (prior to 2000, known simply as Wanuskewin), variously as a member of the Reform Party, the Canadian Alliance, and the Conservative Party. Vellacott was known as an outspoken social conservative, particularly in opposing same-sex marriage and abortion rights.

== Early life and career ==
Vellacott was born in Wadena, Saskatchewan, and was raised in Quill Lake. He joined the Reform Party of Canada in 1990.

Vellacott campaigned in the 1995 Saskatchewan provincial election as a Liberal and lost to New Democratic Party candidate Eric Cline in Saskatoon Mount Royal. He later argued that running as a Liberal was consistent with his political ideology, in that the provincial Liberal platform of 1995 contained several policies advocated by the Reform Party, which did not have provincial affiliates.

Vellacott was elected for Ward Two on the Saskatoon District Health Board in 1995, and served on the board for two years before his election to the House of Commons. He wrote an editorial piece about Canada's health care system in 1996, defending the public model as far superior to the "fragmented" American system in combating administrative waste, but also arguing that the system was in need of renewal and an infusion of funds. Vellacott suggested that Saskatoon District Health could impose a surcharge on American health insurers for certain medical procedures given to American patients, "and in the process make money to inject back into the public system for the people of Saskatchewan."

In early 1997, Vellacott opposed a request by Saskatoon's Gay and Lesbian Health Services (GLHS) for health board funding. Gens Hellquist of GLHS had argued that homophobic intolerance was responsible for higher levels of depression in the LGBT community in relation to society as a whole, and that community-specific funding would address these and other concerns. Vellacott responded by suggesting that many homosexuals were inappropriately blaming their personal difficulties on homophobia.

Vellacott called for the removal of video lottery terminals from the city, blaming them for an increase in health costs related to gambling addiction. His motion for a plebiscite was defeated in May 1997.

Vellacott is a social and economic conservative. His community involvement has included the Canadian Club, Canadian Palliative Care, the Saskatchewan Pro-Life Association, the Saskatchewan Landlords Association, the Saskatchewan Taxpayers Federation, the Evangelical Fellowship of Canada, the Chamber of Commerce, the North Saskatoon Business Association and Toastmasters International. He is a founding board member of Real Choices Crisis Pregnancy Centre in Saskatoon. In Parliament, he was a member of the Reform Party's Family Caucus and a co-chair of the non-partisan Parliamentary Pro-Life Caucus.

== Political career ==
=== Reform MP ===
In early 1997, Vellacott defeated Sam Dyck and Fred Wesolowski to win the Reform Party's nomination for the new Saskatoon-area electoral district of Wanuskewin. Dyck later ran as an independent candidate against Vellacott in the 1997 federal election, arguing that Vellacott would try to "legislate morality" if victorious. Vellacott was nonetheless elected, amid a general gain for Reform in Saskatchewan. The Liberal Party of Canada won a second consecutive majority government, and Vellacott served as a member of the Official Opposition.

Shortly after his election, Vellacott announced that he would introduce a private member's bill to eliminate the national Court Challenges Program, which provides funding for groups that bring human rights cases before the Canadian courts. He argued that "some zealots" were "using our important tax dollars" for dubious ends via the program, and singled out an effort by Saskatoon resident Ailsa Watkinson to prohibit corporal punishment against children. Vellacott wrote an editorial piece in early 1998 describing Watkinson as a "social engineer" promoting an "extremist agenda", and accusing Canada's "unelected judges" of "judicial imperialism" in their interpretations of the Canadian Charter of Rights and Freedoms. A supporter of Watkinson responded that Vellacott's piece was a "mixture of invective and innuendo", and argued that his defence of corporal punishment was based on flawed logic.

Vellacott supported other socially conservative initiatives. In late 1998, he brought forward a "conscience rights" bill to prevent nurses and doctors from being forced to perform abortions. He wrote an editorial against same-sex marriage the following year, arguing that marriage should be restricted to heterosexual couples because of its traditional role in the procreation and nurturing of children. He wrote that "homosexuals already have the right to marry, providing that -- like everybody else -- they marry someone of the opposite sex." He opposed granting spousal benefits for same-sex couples, describing supporters of the initiative as "activist liberal judges and a small but aggressive homosexual lobby."

In 1999, he criticized the Saskatchewan government's decision to force thirteen-year-old Tyrell Dueck into cancer treatment. Dueck's parents objected to continued cancer treatment at the Saskatoon cancer centre on the grounds that it did not appear to be working and instead sought to access a more experimental treatment in Mexico. Vellacott supported parental discretion in such matters.

Vellacott also called for full compensation to Hepatitis C victims during his first term in Parliament, arguing that the government could overcome complicated legal issues around liability by issuing ex gratia payments.

Vellacott confirmed his support for Preston Manning's leadership of the Reform Party in 1998, after two other Saskatchewan Reform MPs called for a leadership review. He originally voted against the 1999 United Alternative initiative which led to the creation of the Canadian Alliance, but later changed his mind and supported it. In March 2000, he became the first Reform MP to endorse Stockwell Day's ultimately successful bid for the Canadian Alliance leadership. Vellacott said that he supported Day's "respect for life and his recognition of the family as the basic building block of society." He also defended the socially conservative Campaign Life Coalition during the campaign, after that organization was criticized for drawing attention to homosexual supporters of rival candidate Tom Long.

=== Canadian Alliance MP ===
Vellacott was re-elected by an increased majority in the 2000 election, as a candidate of the Canadian Alliance.

In January 2001, he argued that Governor General Adrienne Clarkson had abused her office by sending a "best wishes" message to a newly married same-sex couple in Toronto, Ontario. Clarkson's office responded that the letter was a personal courtesy, and was not a political statement.

Stockwell Day's leadership of the Canadian Alliance came under increased scrutiny in the summer of 2001, and several MPs called for his resignation. Vellacott remained a Day supporter, and described the critics as "backstabbers, hijackers (and) guerrillas." Day resigned late in the year, and declared that he would campaign to succeed himself in the following leadership contest. Vellacott again supported his candidacy. Supporters of rival candidate Stephen Harper, who would go on to win the contest, criticized Vellacott for mailing out endorsements of Day through his constituency office at public expense.

Vellacott continued to support socially conservative causes as a Canadian Alliance MP, and was a vocal opponent of embryonic stem-cell research in 2002, although he supported adult stem cell research. In the same year, he mailed out a controversial pamphlet opposing the addition of sexual orientation as a protected category under Canada's hate crimes legislation. Vellacott claimed the policy change "substantially interferes with the right of religious and education leaders to communicate essential matters of faith."

Also in 2002, Vellacott was the only MP to speak against a parliamentary motion recognizing an Armenian genocide as having occurred in 1915. He was quoted as saying:

What the Turks so strenuously object to is the Armenian activists' one-sided portrayal of the tragic events to the world community and labelling them as genocide, using, in some cases, distortion or exaggeration of facts to further their political agenda of obtaining money and land from Turkey. While doing so, Armenians ignore the death and massacre of more than twice as many Turks at the hands of the Armenian revolutionary bands and the Russians whom they were helping during the First World War.

His comments were commended by some Turkish Canadian groups, and criticized by some Armenian Canadians.

The Canadian Alliance merged with the Progressive Conservative Party of Canada in 2003–04 to create the Conservative Party of Canada. Vellacott supported the merger, and endorsed Stephen Harper's successful campaign for the new party's leadership.

=== Conservative MP ===
Vellacott won the Conservative nomination for Saskatoon—Wanuskewin in early 2004, defeating former Progressive Conservative Nick Bakker with 85% support. He faced a difficult challenge in the 2004 federal election from Chris Axworthy, a former federal New Democratic Party (NDP) MP and provincial NDP cabinet minister now running for the Liberals. Vellacott was elected as the Liberals won a minority government nationally.

After the election, Vellacott called for the trial of Saskatoon police officers Ken Munson and Dan Hatchen to be reopened. Munson and Hatchen had been convicted of abandoning an Indigenous man near a power station during freezing weather. Vellacott said new evidence had been found, indicating that the officers dropped the man off within a short walking distance of where he told the officers he lived. He later established a defence fund for the officers. The case was not re-opened.

When the Saskatchewan judicial system approved same-sex marriages in 2004, Vellacott said it was "unfortunate that the Saskatchewan court has followed in the activist footsteps of other courts in this country." He later argued that marriage commissioners should have "conscience rights" to refuse to marry same-sex couples. During a 2005 rally, he said, "there is no such thing as a right to same-sex marriage."

Also in 2005, Vellacott called for legislation making it illegal to harm or kill the unborn children of mothers not planning to have abortions (such that killing a pregnant woman would constitute a double-murder). The suggestion won support from some, while others argued that it could eventually lead to restrictions on abortion.

When Belinda Stronach crossed the floor from the Conservatives to the Liberals in mid-2005, Vellacott suggested that she was prostituting herself for power and had "sold out for a cabinet position." This was criticized as sexist, and Vellacott issued a "statement of regret" for his choice of words.

Vellacott was re-elected over Chris Axworthy a second time in the 2006 federal election, in a contest that was marked by extreme bitterness and controversy. During a live televised debate late in the campaign, a caller falsely suggested that Vellacott had been forced to leave North Park Church in Saskatoon after being accused of sexual assault on a church secretary. The call was subsequently traced to Axworthy's campaign headquarters. Axworthy described the allegations as "deplorable", and apologized to Vellacott for the situation. He denied that anyone in his office was put up to making the call, and suggested that a "mischief-maker" may have entered the office. Former long-term pastor Jerold Gliege indicated that Vellacott never served at or attended the church in question, which has been defunct since 1979. Vellacott's campaign later produced an affidavit from Saskatchewan politician Tom Hengen, in which he "to the best of [his] knowledge and belief" named Axworthy campaign worker George Laliberte as the caller. Axworthy spoke to Laliberte and reported that he vehemently denied making the call. Vellacott's lawyer later filed a defamation suit against Laliberte on March 22, 2006, in the Court of Queen's Bench in Saskatoon. Vellacott won the lawsuit and was awarded $5,000 in damages.

The national Conservative campaign accused the Liberals of a coverup and called for Axworthy to withdraw from the contest. Axworthy declined, denying that he was responsible for any wrongdoing. Vellacott was re-elected with an increased margin of victory.

=== Government backbench ===
The Conservatives won a minority government in the 2006 election, making Vellacott a government backbencher. In March 2006, he wrote an open letter supporting restrictions on abortion and calling for pregnant women to be informed of possible risks associated with abortion.

In April 2006, Vellacott attracted negative attention when he claimed that Indigenous people would travel to the outskirts of Saskatoon to drink in a shack around the same time that allegations surfaced that Saskatoon police were dropping off Indigenous people on "moonlight riders." Vellacott would admit that he never saw the existence of a drinking shack.

He was appointed to serve as chairman of the Commons' Aboriginal Affairs Committee in April 2006. He attracted controversy one month later, after suggesting that Canadian judges consider themselves to have "god-like powers" when rendering their decisions. Vellacott claimed Chief Justice Beverley McLachlin said that "when they step into this role [of supreme court justice] that suddenly there's some kind of mystical power that comes over them, which everything that they've ever decreed is not to be questioned." McLachlin, through a spokesperson, denied having made that comment. Vellacott later issued an apology, indicating that he did not intend to imply McLachlin had actually used the phrase "god-like powers." He added that he was alluding to comments made by McLachlin at a Lord Cooke Lecture, given on December 1, 2005, at the University of Victoria in Wellington, New Zealand. Journalists noted that the "mystical power" quote does not appear in McLachlin's speech. Vellacott also informed reporters that he regarded judicial independence as a "fundamental aspect of a free and democratic society."

Vellacott resigned from his role as committee chairman following significant opposition from other parties. He then served as a member of the House of Commons Standing Committee on the Environment, and called for the Canadian government to intervene against state-sponsored violence in the Darfur province of Sudan.

During his time in parliament, Vellacott served as deputy critic for health, Human Resources Development Canada, and Indian Affairs. He had involvement with several organizations, including the Canadian Club and the Evangelical Fellowship of Canada, and supported Focus on the Family. He received the Queen's Golden Jubilee Medal in 2002, the Commemorative Medal for the Centennial of Saskatchewan in March 2006 and a Diamond Jubilee Medal in 2012; all were automatic by virtue of being an elected Member of Parliament.

Vellacott was re-elected in 2008 and 2011.

In 2013, Vellacott introduced Bill C-560, an Act to Amend the Divorce Act and make shared parenting for children with separated parents the default outcome in courts, barring extraordinary circumstances. The bill was defeated at second reading.

Vellacott decided not to run for re-election in the 2015 federal election. After Stephen Harper's resignation as Conservative leader, Vellacott endorsed Saskatoon MP Brad Trost for the 2017 Conservative Party of Canada leadership election. Vellacott identified Trost as a champion of social conservatism and warned Conservative members against supporting eventual winner Andrew Scheer.

== Controversies ==
In 2012, Vellacott nominated and awarded Queen's Jubilee medals to Linda Gibbons and Mary Wagner, who had both been convicted of criminal offences related to their anti-abortion activism. Gibbons was arrested for repeated violations of injunctions against protesting in front of women's health clinics. Mary Wagner was serving time in jail for mischief and violating court orders regarding women's health clinics when she received her medal. When asked to comment on his decision to recognize these two women, Vellacott released a statement that referred to them as "heroines of humanity", and justified his decision by stating: "It's a pretty upside down world when we honour abortionists like Henry Morgentaler for killing over 5,000 babies and imprison precious women, like Mary Wagner and Linda Gibbons, who try to save babies from such savagery. They are the real heroes of humanity!" Vellacott's decision to bestow the Queen's Jubilee Medal on Gibbon and Wagner has been praised by pro-life groups such as the Campaign Life Coalition and the Catholic Register. Interim Liberal leader Bob Rae criticized Vellacott's statements as inciting anti-abortion activists to break the law, which is itself a criminal offence in Canada.

In 2022, Vellacott was named as one of at least three Saskatoon politicians for whom students at the local Legacy Christian Academy school (then Christian Centre Academy) were coerced into campaigning, along with former mayor Don Atchison and sitting City Council member Randy Donauer. This was revealed as former students of the school launched a class action lawsuit against former staff of the school and affiliated church for child abuse. Vellacott confirmed that students worked on his campaigns but denied that they were coerced into doing so. He stated that such work "was a good education for them," and that he found it "quite invigorating, exhilarating because there were so many young people involved."

== Electoral record ==
2011 Canadian federal election: Saskatoon—Wanuskewin
Party	Candidate	Votes	%	±%	Expenditures
Conservative	Maurice Vellacott	21,183	58.43	+1.92	–
New Democratic	John Parry	11,395	31.43	+7.07	–
Liberal	Patricia Zipchen	2,428	6.70	-5.70	–
Green	Mark Bigland-Pritchard	1,250	3.45	-3.28	–
Total valid votes/Expense limit		36,256	100.00		
Total rejected ballots		134	0.37	+0.06	
Turnout		36,390	64.33	+5.55	
Eligible voters		56,570	–	–	

2008 Canadian federal election: Saskatoon—Wanuskewin
Party	Candidate	Votes	%	±%	Expenditures
Conservative	Maurice Vellacott	18,320	56.51	+7.12	$36,224
New Democratic	Clint Davidson	7,898	24.36	+2.28	$20,679
Liberal	Patricia Zipchen	4,020	12.40	-11.68	$13,240
Green	Tobi-Dawne Smith	2,182	6.73	+3.14	$3,675
Total valid votes/Expense limit		32,420	100.00	$80,396	
Total rejected ballots		100	0.31	+0.04	
Turnout		32,520	58.78	-8.57	

2006 Canadian federal election: Saskatoon—Wanuskewin
Party	Candidate	Votes	%	±%	Expenditures
Conservative	Maurice Vellacott	17,753	49.39	+2.74	$62,331.71
Liberal	Chris Axworthy	8,655	24.08	−8.50	$52,437.43
New Democratic	Jim Maddin	7,939	22.09	+4.27	$35,098.35
Green	Don Cameron	1,292	3.59	+0.63	$880.29
Christian Heritage	Dale Sanders	307	0.85	−0.90	$1,552.99
Total valid votes		35,946	100.00		
Total rejected ballots		96	0.27	+0.03	
Turnout		36,042	67.35	+7.63	
Electors on the lists		53,513			

2004 Canadian federal election: Saskatoon—Wanuskewin
Party	Candidate	Votes	%	±%	Expenditures
Conservative	Maurice Vellacott	15,109	46.64	−11.09	$66,433.82
Liberal	Chris Axworthy	10,553	32.58	+15.76	$72,269.97
New Democratic	Priscilla Settee	5,770	17.81	−6.42	$38,635.22
Green	David Greenfield	960	2.96	+1.75	$25.00
Total valid votes		32,392	100.00		
Total rejected ballots		76	0.23	−0.03	
Turnout		32,468	59.72	−1.90	
Electors on the lists		54,366			
Percentage change figures are factored for redistribution. Conservative Party percentages are contrasted with the combined Canadian Alliance and Progressive Conservative percentages from 2000.
Sources: Official Results, Elections Canada and Financial Returns, Elections Canada.

2000 Canadian federal election: Saskatoon—Wanuskewin
Party	Candidate	Votes	%	±%	Expenditures
Alliance	Maurice Vellacott	17,404	52.57	+13.42	$59,707.59
New Democratic	Hugh Walker	8,022	24.23	−2.55	$34,545.31
Liberal	Bill Patrick	5,567	16.82	−7.61	$16,493.01
Progressive Conservative	Kirk Eggum	1,709	5.16	−2.76	$0.00
Green	David Greenfield	402	1.21		$0.00
Total valid votes		33,104	100.00		
Total rejected ballots		86	0.26	−0.08	
Turnout		33,190	61.62	−2.17	
Electors on the lists		53,862			
Sources: Official Results, Elections Canada and Financial Returns, Elections Canada.

1997 Canadian federal election: Wanuskewin
Party	Candidate	Votes	%	Expenditures
Reform	Maurice Vellacott	12,854	39.16	$39,845
New Democratic	Walter Kyliuk	8,793	26.79	$57,104
Liberal	Tom Hengen	8,020	24.43	$35,221
Progressive Conservative	Ron Meakin	2,602	7.93	$7,207
Independent	Sam Dyck	420	1.28	$1,781
Natural Law	Patrick J. Coulterman	138	0.42	$61
Total valid votes		32,827	100.00	
Total rejected ballots		112	0.34	
Turnout		32,939	63.79	
Electors on the lists		51,635		
Sources: Official Results, Elections Canada and Financial Returns, Elections Canada.

1995 Saskatchewan general election: Saskatoon Mount Royal
Party	Candidate	Votes	%
New Democratic	Eric Cline	3,894	63.16
Liberal	Maurice Vellacott	1,783	28.92
Progressive Conservative	Patrick Bundrock	488	7.92
Total valid votes		6,165	100.00
Total rejected ballots		26	
Turnout		6,191	54.91
Electors on the lists		11,274	

All federal election information is taken from Elections Canada. All provincial election information is taken from Elections Saskatchewan. Italicized expenditures refer to submitted totals, and are presented when the final reviewed totals are not available.
