= Liberal Party of Canada candidates in the 2000 Canadian federal election =

The Liberal Party of Canada ran a full slate of candidates in the 2000 federal election, and won a majority government by winning 172 out of 308 seats. Many of the party's candidates have their own biography pages; information about others may be found here.

== Quebec ==
=== Roland Paradis (Bas-Richelieu—Nicolet—Bécancour) ===
Roland Paradis was a building contractor living in Bécancour in 1993. He received 13,781 votes (31.04%), finishing second against Bloc Québécois incumbent Louis Plamondon. He initially planned to seek the Liberal nomination again for the 2004 federal election but did not present his candidacy at the nomination meeting.

=== Normand Biron (Mercier) ===
Normand Biron (1944 – 19 March 2008) was a chartered accountant. He ran for the Liberal nomination in Anjou—Rivière-des-Prairies in the buildup to the 1988 federal election but withdrew before the vote, charging that the local party association's cultural divisions would make it impossible for a francophone to win. He won the same riding's nomination for the 1993 election and finished a very close second to Bloc Québécois candidate Roger Pomerleau. He was defeated by a wider margin in 2000.

Electoral record
| Election | Division | Party | Votes | % | Place | Winner |
|---|---|---|---|---|---|---|
| 1993 federal | Anjou—Rivière-des-Prairies | Liberal | 25,631 | 42.22 | 2/6 | Roger Pomerleau, Bloc Québécois |
| 2000 federal | Mercier | Liberal | 15,416 | 32.93 | 2/8 | Francine Lalonde, Bloc Québécois |

== Manitoba ==
=== Richard B. (Dick) Scott (Brandon—Souris) ===
Scott was born on 3 March 1945, and received a Grade Twelve education. Scott served with the Winnipeg Police Service for 25 years before moving to Brandon, and became the latter city's police chief in 1995. During the 1990s, he indicated that his force supported the Canadian gun registry introduced by the government of Jean Chrétien. He later stated his disappointment that the Brandon force did not hire more women and aboriginal persons to fill a slate of vacancies in 1998. In 1999, he endorsed a decision by the Canadian Association of Chiefs of Police to decriminalize simple possession of marijuana, arguing that it would free the judicial system to deal with more important cases. Scott also served as president of the Canada Games Society in 1997, and was appointed to a special Ministerial Millennium Advisory Committee the following year.

He received 6,544 votes (17.86%) in 2000, finishing third against Progressive Conservative incumbent Rick Borotsik. As of 2006, he is the Director of Training for Office Box Office Ltd., and Director of Policing at the Opaskwayak Cree Nation in The Pas. He has also participated in an independent committee on reforming women's corrections, appointed by the provincial government.

=== Gerry John Edward Gebler (Portage—Lisgar) ===
Gebler was born on 16 July 1943, and was raised in the Kelwood area of Manitoba. He worked as an insurance broker, served as a councillor in Morden, Manitoba from 1971 to 1980, and was the community's mayor from 1999 until his defeat in 2002. A born-again Christian, Gebler nevertheless argued that governments should not legislate on moral issues such as abortion (he observed that when a young, unwed member of his family became pregnant, none of the involved parties considered seeking political advice) (Winnipeg Free Press, 15 November 2000). He received 6,133 votes (17.82%) in the 2000 election, finishing second against Canadian Alliance candidate Brian Pallister.

Gebler died on 7 October 2005, at age 62. His funeral service was held at the Morden Alliance Church.

=== Bret Dobbin (Winnipeg—Transcona) ===
Dobbin was born on 8 June 1962 in Portland, Oregon. He has a Bachelor of Science degree, and was a software consultant for Healthcare during the 2000 election.

Dobbin has campaigned for the federal and provincial Liberal parties. He defeated Taran Malik to win the federal party's nomination in 2000, and lost to New Democratic Party incumbent Bill Blaikie in the general election. During this campaign, Dobbin attempted to warn voters that the NDP could fall short of official party status in parliament, and suggested that re-electing Blaikie would be an exercise in futility.

Electoral record
| Election | Division | Party | Votes | % | Place | Winner |
|---|---|---|---|---|---|---|
| 1995 provincial | Concordia | Liberal | 816 | 10.75 | 3/4 | Gary Doer, New Democratic Party |
| 2000 federal | Winnipeg—Transcona | Liberal | 6,041 | 18.43 | 3/8 | Bill Blaikie, New Democratic Party |

== Saskatchewan ==
=== Bill Patrick (Saskatoon—Wanuskewin) ===
Patrick was born on 5 October 1929 in Saskatoon. He worked in construction and mining, and purchased Patrick Construction Co. Ltd. from his father in 1950. The company eventually grew into a multi-million dollar organization, with branches in such fields as electrical, mechanical, water and sewage services. Patrick oversaw pipe work construction in Saudi Arabia in 1983, and retired in 1985. He played hockey with Gordie Howe as a child and remained active with the sport in adult life, serving as president of Saskatoon's Senior Quakers in the 1960s.

Patrick has campaigned four times for the Liberal Party at the provincial and federal levels. In 1998, he described Jean Chrétien as the best Prime Minister he had worked with (Saskatoon Star-Phoenix, 3 March 1998).

Patrick is personally anti-abortion, and was supported by the Campaign Life Coalition in the 1988 federal election against Justice Minister Ray Hnatyshyn (Toronto Star, 1 December 1988). Both were defeated by Chris Axworthy of the New Democratic Party. During the 2000 campaign, Patrick responded to a question about abortion by indicating that governments should not intervene in such matters (SSP, 22 November 2000).

He attracted controversy in 2000 for comments about Canada's aboriginal reserve system. In response to an opponent's criticism, he argued that many reserves were flourishing economically and that the existing system was "working 100 per cent". Some interpreted this to mean that he was ignoring serious on-reserve social problems. Patrick later clarified that his intent was to draw attention to recent success stories in his community, not to indicate that on-reserve conditions were perfect (SSP, 23 November 2000).

Patrick appears to have campaigned for the Liberal Party of British Columbia in that province's 1991 provincial election. "William J. Patrick" was the party's candidate in Parksville-Qualicum, and was listed as a contractor. For reasons of convenience, this candidacy is listed in the chart below.

Electoral record
| Election | Division | Party | Votes | % | Place | Winner |
|---|---|---|---|---|---|---|
| 1972 federal | Saskatoon—Biggar | Liberal | 8,641 | | 3/4 | Alfred Gleave, New Democratic Party |
| 1978 Saskatchewan provincial | Rosthern | Liberal | 964 | | 3/3 | Ralph Katzman, Progressive Conservative |
| 1988 federal | Saskatoon—Clark's Crossing | Liberal | 6,554 | | 3/4 | Chris Axworthy, New Democratic Party |
| 1991 British Columbia provincial | Parksville-Qualicum | Liberal | 9,126 | | 2/5 | Leonard Krog, New Democratic Party |
| 2000 federal | Saskatoon—Wanuskewin | Liberal | 5,567 | 16.82 | 3/5 | Maurice Vellacott, Canadian Alliance |
