= Gebler =

Gebler is a surname. Notable people with the surname include:

- Friedrich August von Gebler or Fedor Vasilievich Gebler (1781–1850), Prussian-born Russian naturalist
- Gerry J.E. Gebler (1943–2005), Canadian politician

== See also ==
- Geller
