= International institutes on political management =

This is a list of various international institutes teaching full-time, part-time and short-term programs in political management. Political science, political economics, political history may be used by various institutions to represent similar topics.

- Harvard Institute of Politics
- Institute for Advanced Strategic and Political Studies
- Institute of Parliamentary and Political Law
- Robert J. Dole Institute of Politics
- University of Moral and Political Science.
- The Fund for American Studies
- Institute for International Political Studies
- International Republican Institute
- Institute of Political Science of SAS
- Hinckley Institute of Politics
- The Robert Day School, The Lowe Institute of Political Economy
- Soros Foundation
- The Institute of World Politics
- Institute of Socio-Political Research
- Vertical Politics Institute
- Brown University
- Moscow State Institute of International Relations
- Askew Institute on Politics and Society
- Pepperdine School of Public Policy
- Beijing International Studies University
- S. Rajaratnam School of International Studies
- Gokhale Institute of Politics and Economics
- Graduate Institute of International and Development Studies
- Institute for Politics, Democracy & the Internet
- George Washington University Graduate School of Political Management
