= Laliberté =

Laliberte or Laliberté is a surname of French origin, meaning "freedom". Notable people with the surname include:

- Connie Laliberte (born 1960), Canadian curler
- David Laliberté (born 1986), Canadian ice hockey player
- Guy Laliberté (born 1959), founder of Cirque du Soleil
- Janet Arnott (née Laliberte; 1956–2019), Canadian curler
- John Laliberte (born 1983), American ice hockey player
- Patrice Laliberté, Canadian film and television director and screenwriter
- Pierre Laliberté, Canadian politician
- Rick Laliberte (born 1958), Canadian politician
