= Bill Patrick =

Bill Patrick may refer to:

- Bill Patrick (cricketer) (1885–1946), New Zealand cricketer
- Bill Patrick (footballer) (born 1932), Scottish association football player
- Bill Patrick (sports anchor) (born 1955), sports anchor for NHL on Versus and NBC Sports
- Bill Patrick (Canadian politician)

== See also ==
- William Patrick (disambiguation)
- Patrick Williams (disambiguation)
