= 2001 Saskatchewan New Democratic Party leadership election =

- January 27, 2001
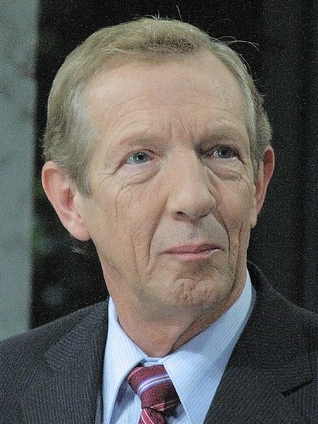

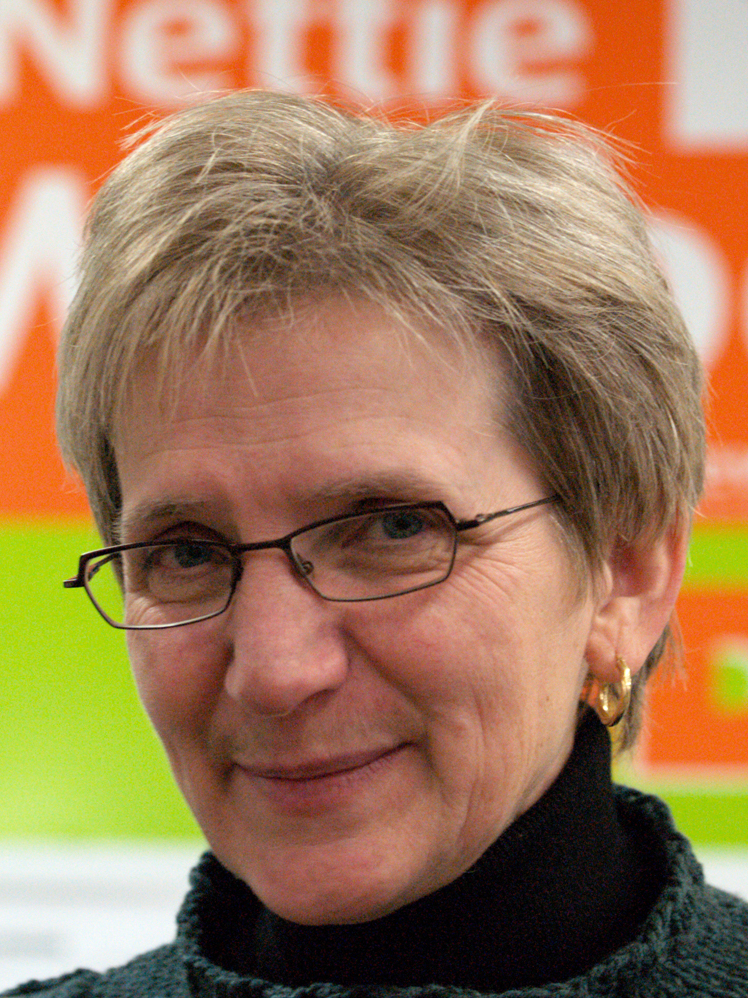
		NDP
Candidate	Lorne Calvert	Chris Axworthy	Nettie Wiebe
Riding	none (Note: Previously a member of the Legislative Assembly for Moose Jaw Wakamow from 1986 to 1999. Won a by-election in Saskatoon Riversdale, Roy Romanow's former seat, after the leadership election in March 2001)	Saskatoon Fairview	none
Final ballot	10,289 (57.60%)	7,575 (42.40%)	eliminated
First ballot	6,542 (33.66%)	5,344 (27.50%)	3,487 (17.94%)
Leader before election
Roy Romanow
Elected Leader
Lorne Calvert

2001 Saskatchewan New Democratic Party leadership election
- Date: January 27, 2001
- Resigning leader: Roy Romanow
- Won by: Lorne Calvert
- Ballots: 4
- Candidates: 7

The 2001 Saskatchewan New Democratic Party leadership election was held on January 27, 2001, to elect a successor to Roy Romanow as leader of the Saskatchewan New Democratic Party. The election was necessary because Romanow had announced his intention to step down as leader on September 26, 2000. Lorne Calvert won on the fourth ballot, defeating Chris Axworthy.

== Background ==
Attorney General Chris Axworthy largely campaigned on continuing Romanow's legacy, including his Third Way policies.

Lorne Calvert campaigned on a return to the NDP's social democratic roots, positioning himself to the left of both Axworthy and Romanow.

Wiebe ran an explicitly anti-neoliberal campaign, and was perceived as the most left-wing of the candidates.

== Candidates ==
=== Chris Axworthy ===
Chris Axworthy was the MLA for Saskatoon Fairview and Attorney General of Saskatchewan. He was first elected in a June 1999 provincial by-election held months before the 1999 provincial election. Previously, he was the MP for Saskatoon—Rosetown—Biggar (1997–1999) and Saskatoon—Clark's Crossing (1988–1997). Before entering politics, he was a professor of law at the University of Saskatchewan.

=== Scott Banda ===
Scott Banda was a lawyer from Saskatoon. He was previously president of the Saskatchewan Young New Democrats.

=== Buckley Belanger ===
Buckley Belanger was the MLA for Athabasca. He was first elected in the 1995 provincial election. Belanger was originally elected as a member of the Saskatchewan Liberal Party, but left to join the Saskatchewan NDP in 1998. Previously, he was mayor of Île-à-la-Crosse from 1988 to 1994. Before entering politics, he was a journalist for the Missinipi Broadcasting Corporation.

=== Lorne Calvert ===
Lorne Calvert was previously the MLA for Moose Jaw Wakamow (1991–1999) and Moose Jaw South (1986–1991). He had also been the Minister of Social Services from 1995 to 1998. Before entering politics, he was a United Church minister.

=== Joanne Crofford ===
Joanne Crofford was the MLA for Regina Centre. She was first elected in the 1991 provincial election. Before entering politics, she was a civil servant.

=== Maynard Sonntag ===
Maynard Sonntag was the MLA for Meadow Lake. He was first elected in the 1991 provincial election. Before entering politics, he was the manager of a credit union.

=== Nettie Wiebe ===
Nettie Wiebe was previously the president of the National Farmers Union from 1995 to 1998. Immediately prior to the leadership election, she was a professor at the University of Saskatchewan.

== Ballot results ==
First Ballot
Candidate	Votes	Percentage
Lorne Calvert	6,542	33.66
Chris Axworthy	5,344	27.50
Nettie Wiebe	3,487	17.94
Maynard Sonntag	1,459	7.51
Scott Banda	1,269	6.53
Joanne Crofford	669	3.44
Buckley Belanger	665	3.42
Total	19,435	100.00

(Crofford and Belanger eliminated at under 5%)

Second Ballot
Candidate	Weighted Votes	Percentage	+/-
Lorne Calvert	6,877	35.65	+1.99
Chris Axworthy	5,646	29.26	+1.76
Nettie Wiebe	3,749	19.43	+1.49
Maynard Sonntag	1,712	8.87	+1.36
Scott Banda	1,309	6.78	+0.25
Total	19,293	100.00	

(Banda eliminated, Sonntag withdraws)

Third Ballot
Candidate	Weighted Votes	Percentage	+/-
Lorne Calvert	7,831	41.80	+6.15
Chris Axworthy	6,686	35.69	+6.43
Nettie Wiebe	4,216	22.51	+3.08
Total	18,733	100.00	

(Wiebe eliminated)

Fourth Ballot
Candidate	Weighted Votes	Percentage	+/-
Lorne Calvert	10,289	57.60	+15.80
Chris Axworthy	7,575	42.40	+6.71
Total	17,864	100.00	
