= Institute of Parliamentary and Political Law =

Canadian not-for-profit corporation

The Institute of Parliamentary and Political Law is a Canadian not-for-profit corporation, founded in February 2008. The Institute engages in professional and educational activities aimed at interdisciplinary, comprehensive and comparative analysis of public affairs. The Institute is non-partisan, autonomous from any partisan political organizations or interests and does not engage in advocacy. It is based in Ottawa, Ontario and its national membership comes from the legal, public policy and administration, and political science communities.

== Subject Matter ==
Parliamentary and Political Law means the field of law, legal scholarship and legal practice relating to the functions and operations of parliamentary, governmental and judicial institutions and their respective officials.

Parliamentary Law means the body of law dealing with the establishment and functioning of parliamentary institutions, and includes the law of parliamentary privilege.

Political Law means the body of law dealing with the structure of the State and the processes of governing, with the application of legal, public policy and political instruments of governing, and with the impact of law on democratic governing.

Within the overall domain of public law, Parliamentary and Political Law is complementary to constitutional law and administrative law. As an interdisciplinary study, it is distinct from, yet linked to, political science, and public policy and administration.

The Institute (and through its Journal) specializes in the interdisciplinary, comprehensive and comparative analysis of these topics.

== Publications and Programs ==
The Institute publishes The Journal of Parliamentary and Political Law three times a year, which is available through Carswell Thomson.

It also hosts a bi-annual conference, and The Third Law and Parliament Conference was held November 2009 at the University of Toronto.

== Officers ==
- Honorary Patron: The Right Honourable Beverley McLachlin, Chief Justice of Canada
- Chair of the Board of Directors: Robert R. Walsh, Law Clerk and Parliamentary Counsel, House of Commons
- President: Christopher Axworthy, Q.C., Dean, Faculty of Law, University of Manitoba
- Executive Director and Secretary of the Board, and Treasurer: Gregory Tardi, Senior Parliamentary Counsel, Legal Services, House of Commons
