= William Patrick =

William Patrick may refer to:

- William Patrick (author), American author
- William Patrick (minister) (1791–1872), minister of the Church of Scotland
- William Patrick Sr. (1845–1936), Australian politician
- William Patrick Jr. (1880–1968), Australian politician
- William C. Patrick III (1926–2010), American biologist
- William Penn Patrick (1930–1973), American entrepreneur and businessman
- William S. Patrick (19th century), American politician, mayor of Flint, Michigan
- William Patrick (diver) (1931–2016), Canadian diver
- William Patrick (Canadian politician) (1810–1883), clergyman, merchant and political figure in Canada West

== See also ==
- Patrick (surname)
- Bill Patrick (disambiguation)
- Patrick Williams (disambiguation)
