= Patrick Williams =

Patrick or Pat Williams may refer to:

== Politics ==
- Pat Williams (Montana politician) (1937–2025), member of the US House of Representatives from Montana, 1979–1997
- Patrick Williams (Louisiana politician) (born 1963), member of the Louisiana House of Representatives

== Sports ==
- Patrick Williams (cricketer) (1912–1981), English cricketer
- Pat Williams (basketball) (1940–2024), American basketball executive, senior vice-president of Orlando Magic
- Pat Williams (American football) (born 1972), American football defensive tackle for the Buffalo Bills and Minnesota Vikings
- Patrick Williams (fighter) (born 1981), American MMA fighter
- Patrick Williams (wide receiver) (born 1986), American football player for the Baltimore Ravens
- Patrick Williams (basketball) (born 2001), American basketball player for the Chicago Bulls

== Other ==
- Patrick J. Williams, pseudonym of W. E. B. Griffin (1929–2019), American novelist
- Patrick Williams (composer) (1939–2018), American composer of orchestral works, and songs and themes for film and television
- Pat Williams (director), Canadian television director
- Pat Ward Williams (born 1948), African-American photographer

== See also ==
- Williams (surname)
- William Patrick (disambiguation)
- Bill Patrick (disambiguation)
- Patricia J. Williams (born 1951), American legal scholar
