= Saskatchewan Party candidates, 2003 Saskatchewan provincial election =

The Saskatchewan Party ran a full slate of 58 candidates in the 1999 provincial election, and won 28 seats to form the official opposition in the Legislative Assembly of Saskatchewan. Several candidates have their own biography pages; information on others may be found here.

== Patrick Bundrock (Saskatoon Sutherland) ==
Bundrock campaigned for the Progressive Conservative Party in the 1995 provincial election, and served on the Reform Party of Canada's Saskatoon—Humboldt riding executive in the mid-1990s (Saskatoon Star-Phoenix, 18 May 1996). He became an executive assistant to Member of Parliament (MP) Jim Pankiw in 1998.

He sought the Canadian Alliance nomination for Saskatoon—Rosetown—Biggar in the 2000 federal election, and lost to Carol Skelton. He was listed as 29 years old at the time (19 August 2000).

Bundrock's association with Pankiw became controversial in the leadup to the 2003 campaign, after Pankiw made several controversial comments about aboriginal rights (7 March 2003). Bundrock resigned from Pankiw's office in March 2003, citing differences of opinion on aboriginal policy (13 March 2003).

He lost to New Democrat Graham Addley in 2003, after outspending Addley by a margin of $43,323 to $38,007 (6 March 2004).

Electoral record
Election	Division	Party	Votes	%	Place	Winner
1995 provincial	Saskatoon Mount Royal	P.C.	488	7.92	3/3	Eric Cline, New Democratic Party
2003 provincial	Saskatoon Sutherland	Sask.	2,043		2/4	Graham Addley, New Democratic Party
