= Eric Cline =

Eric Cline may refer to:

- Eric Cline (politician), a Canadian politician
- Eric H. Cline, an archaeologist, author, historian, and professor
