= List of Law Clerks and Parliamentary Counsel of the Canadian House of Commons =

This is a list of Law Clerks and Parliamentary Counsel of the House of Commons of Canada.

- Gustavus W. Wicksteed – 1867–1887
- William Wilson – 1887–1890
- Frederick Augustus McCord – 1890–1908
- A.H. O'Brien – 1909–1914
- Francis A. Gisborne – 1914–1922
- Joseph K. Foran – 1923–1924
- Arthur Gordon Troop – 1924–1925
- Paul Maurice Ollivier – 1925–1952
- Arthur Gordon Troop – 1926–1936
- Arthur Angus Fraser – 1938–1952
- Paul Maurice Ollivier – 1952–1970
- Joseph Maingot – 1971–1982
- Marcel R. Pelletier – 1983–1991
- Robert R. Walsh – 1999–2012
- Richard Denis (acting) – 2012–2013
- Richard Fujarczuk – 2013–2014
- Richard Denis (acting) – 2014–2015
- Philippe Dufresne – 2015–2022
- Michel Bédard (acting) – 2022–2023
- Michel Bédard – 2024–present
