= Beverley McLachlin =

Chief Justice of Canada from 2000 to 2017

The Right Honourable Beverley McLachlin PC CC
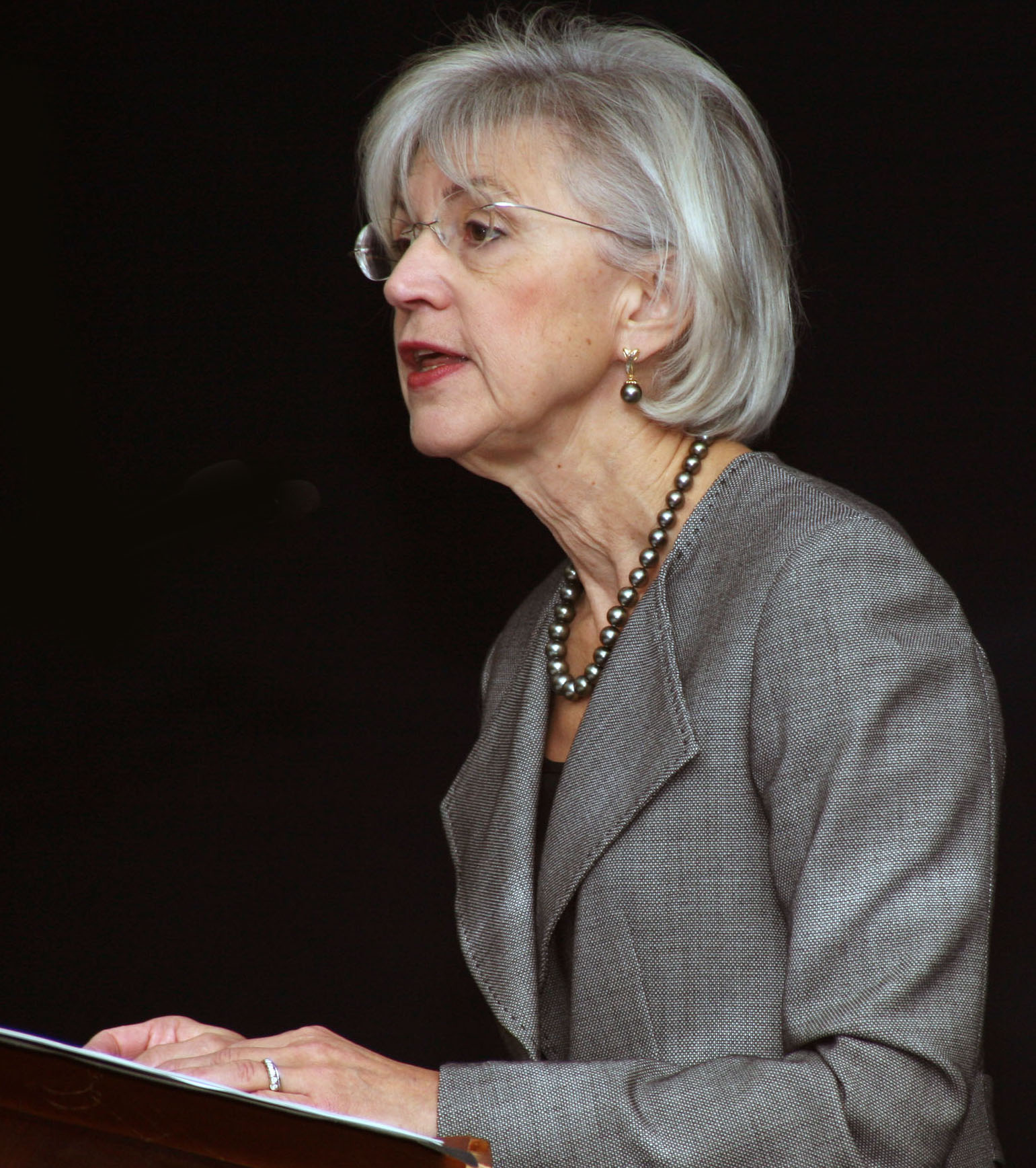
- McLachlin in 2007

17th Chief Justice of Canada
- In office January 7, 2000 – December 15, 2017
- Nominated by: Jean Chrétien
- Appointed by: Adrienne Clarkson
- Preceded by: Antonio Lamer
- Succeeded by: Richard Wagner

Non-Permanent Judge of the Court of Final Appeal of Hong Kong
- in office July 30, 2018 – July 29, 2024
- Appointed by: Carrie Lam

Puisne Justice of the Supreme Court of Canada
- In office March 30, 1989 – January 7, 2000
- Nominated by: Brian Mulroney
- Appointed by: Jeanne Sauvé
- Preceded by: William McIntyre
- Succeeded by: Louis LeBel

Chief Justice of the Supreme Court of British Columbia
- In office 1988–1990
- Appointed by: Jeanne Sauvé

Personal details
- Born: Beverley Gietz; September 7, 1943 (age 83) Pincher Creek, Alberta, Canada
- Spouses: Roderick McLachlin (m. 1967; died 1988) Frank McArdle (m. 1992)
- Children: Angus McLachlin (b. 1976)
- Education: University of Alberta (BA, MA, LLB)
- Profession: Judge

Chinese name
- Traditional Chinese: 麥嘉琳
- Simplified Chinese: 麦嘉琳
Transcriptions
Standard Mandarin
- Hanyu Pinyin: Mài Jiālín
Yue: Cantonese
- Yale Romanization: Mahk Gā Làhm
- Jyutping: Mak^{6} Gaa^{1} Lam^{4}

Beverley Marian McLachlin PC CC (born September 7, 1943) is a Canadian jurist and author who served as the 17th chief justice of Canada from 2000 to 2017. She is the longest-serving chief justice in Canadian history and the first woman to hold the position.

== Early life and family ==
McLachlin was born Beverley Gietz in Pincher Creek, Alberta, the eldest child of Eleanora Marian (née Kruschell) and Ernest Gietz. Her parents, who were of German descent, were "fundamentalist Christians" of the Pentecostal Church. She received a B.A. and an M.A. in philosophy as well as an LL.B. degree (winning the gold medal as top student, and serving as notes editor of the Alberta Law Review) from the University of Alberta.

McLachlin has one son, Angus (born 1976), from her first marriage to Roderick McLachlin, who took care of much of Angus's upbringing. Roderick died of cancer in 1988, a few days after she was appointed chief justice of the Supreme Court of British Columbia.

In 1992, McLachlin married Frank McArdle, a lawyer and the executive director of the Canadian Superior Courts Judges Association.

== Early legal career ==
=== Lawyer and professor (1969–1981) ===
McLachlin was called to the bar of Alberta in 1969 where she worked with the Edmonton firm of Wood, Moir, Hyde & Ross. In 1971 she moved to British Columbia and was called to the British Columbia bar, working for the firm Bull Housser Tupper from 1972 until 1975.

From 1974 to 1981, she was a professor at the University of British Columbia.

=== Lower court judge (1981–1989) ===
In April 1981, McLachlin was appointed to the County Court of Vancouver. Five months later, in September 1981, she was appointed to the Supreme Court of British Columbia. In December 1985, she was appointed to the British Columbia Court of Appeal.

In September 1988, McLachlin was appointed chief justice of the Supreme Court of British Columbia.

== Justice of the Supreme Court of Canada (1989–2017) ==
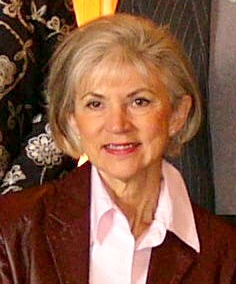
McLachlin on 1 May 2008 during the State Visit by the New Zealand governor-general to Canada

McLachlin was nominated by Brian Mulroney to be made a puisne justice to the Supreme Court of Canada on March 30, 1989, and an ex-officio member of the Queen's Privy Council for Canada. Among early contributions to the judicial institution, she wrote the majority judgment in:

- R v Hebert [1990] 2 S.C.R. 151, the leading Supreme Court of Canada decision on an accused's right to silence under section seven of the Canadian Charter of Rights and Freedoms;
- R v Zundel [1992] 2 S.C.R. 731 is a Supreme Court of Canada decision where the Court struck down the provision in the Criminal Code that prohibited publication of false news on the basis that it violated the freedom of expression provision under section 2(b) of the Canadian Charter of Rights and Freedoms.

=== Chief justice of Canada ===
On the advice of Jean Chrétien, McLachlin was appointed the chief justice of Canada on January 7, 2000.

Upon being sworn into the Supreme Court of Canada, she also became a deputy of the governor general of Canada together with the other justices of the Supreme Court. When Governor General Adrienne Clarkson was hospitalized for a cardiac pacemaker operation on July 8, 2005, McLachlin performed the duties of the governor general as the administrator of Canada. In her role as administrator, she gave royal assent to the Civil Marriage Act which legalized same-sex marriage nationally in Canada. She relinquished that task when the governor general returned to good health in late July.

While she was chief justice, McLachlin chaired the Canadian Judicial Council. She is also on the board of governors of the National Judicial Institute and on the advisory council of the Order of Canada.

In July 2013, during the consultation period prior to appointment for Marc Nadon, Chief Justice McLachlin contacted justice minister Peter MacKay and the Prime Minister's Office regarding the eligibility of Marc Nadon for a Quebec seat on the Supreme Court. Prime Minister Stephen Harper stated that he had refused a phone call from McLachlin on the attorney general's advice. Harper's comments were criticized by the legal community and a complaint was forwarded to the International Commission of Jurists in Switzerland. The International Commission of Jurists concluded that Beverly McLachlin deserved an apology from Harper, but none had been given as of July 2014.

In May 2015, McLachlin was invited to speak at the Global Centre for Pluralism, and said that Canada attempted to commit "cultural genocide" against aboriginal peoples in what she called the worst stain on Canada's human-rights record. University of Regina academic Ken Coates supported McLachlin, and said that she was "only stating what is clearly in the minds of judges, lawyers and aboriginal people across the country". Others were less sympathetic. Columnist Lysiane Gagnon called the comments "unacceptable" and "highly inflammatory" and suggested that McLachlin had opened herself up to accusations of prejudice. Gordon Gibson, another columnist, said the use of the word "genocide" was incendiary and disproportionate and that the Chief Justice's comments made her sound like a legislator.

McLachlin retired from the Supreme Court on December 15, 2017, nine months before reaching the mandatory retirement age of 75. Her successor as Chief Justice of Canada is Richard Wagner, who was nominated by Prime Minister Justin Trudeau in 2017. Her successor as a justice of the court is Sheilah Martin, who was nominated by Trudeau through a new process for judicial appointments to the Supreme Court of Canada that permitted, "any Canadian lawyer or judge who fits a specified criteria" to apply.

== Post-retirement from the Supreme Court ==
From 2016 to 2020, she was the college visitor of Massey College. In 2017, she was elected visitor of Queens' College, Cambridge.

=== International jurist ===
McLachlin was nominated in March 2018 to become a non-permanent member of the Court of Final Appeal in Hong Kong. The court appoints foreign judges from common-law jurisdictions outside of Hong Kong, of which McLachlin is the first Canadian, to sit as non-permanent members of the court. Her three-year appointment was approved by the Hong Kong Legislative Council, and the chief executive gazetted the appointment effective July 30, 2018. McLachlin's appointment was accompanied by those of Brenda Hale, also as non-permanent judge, and Andrew Cheung, as permanent judge, at the court. She was reappointed to the court in 2021 for a second three-year term.

Her service on the court has been criticized amidst the Hong Kong pro-democracy protests and imposition of the National Security Law, which is seen by Western observers as threatening civil liberties in the city. As a Court of Final Appeal judge, McLachlin would be required to uphold the law in appellate judgements. A motion at the Law Society of Ontario to condemn her appointment was defeated 28–17 in February 2021. In June 2022, she announced her decision to remain on the court which she believes to still be independent. McLachlin retired from the court when her term expired in July 2024.

McLachlin also serves as an international judge on the Singapore International Commercial Court.

=== Novelist and memoirist ===
In 2018, McLachlin published a legal thriller novel titled Full Disclosure. Her second novel, Denial, was published in 2021 by Simon & Schuster. She followed up with Proof in 2024.

McLachlin's memoir, Truth Be Told: My Journey Through Life and the Law, was published in 2019. It won the Shaughnessy Cohen Prize for Political Writing in 2020.

== Judicial philosophy ==
McLachlin has defined the judicial function as one that requires conscious objectivity, which she has described as follows:

What you have to try to do as a judge, whether you're on charter issues or any other issue, is by an act of the imagination put yourself in the shoes of the different parties, and think about how it looks from their perspective, and really think about it, not just give it lip service.

McLachlin has argued that courts may be justified in changing the law where such a change would accord with changes in society's values. She regards Edwards v Canada (Attorney General), in which the Judicial Committee of the Privy Council found that women were entitled to sit in the Senate of Canada, as a paradigm case in Canadian law. She has stated "courts are the ultimate guardians of the rights of society, in our system of government." She has also stated, "I think the court belongs to the Canadian people and it should reflect the Canadian people."

McLachlin has defended the view that "legal certainty"—the notion that there is one correct answer to a legal question, which judges can discover with diligence—is a "myth".

Mahmud Jamal, now a puisne justice of the Supreme Court of Canada, has argued that McLachlin's jurisprudence on the law of federalism is consistent with her "self-described judicial philosophy", namely that judges are to be "scrupulously non-partisan and impartial".

== Honours and awards ==
Coat of arms of Beverley McLachlin
| Crest A great horned owl Proper perched on a pair of pincers fesswise Or set on a hockey stick Proper. Escutcheon Per fess Gules and Argent four pallets counterchanged overall a bezant charged with a balance Sable within a bordure compony Argent and Gules on a chief Or a pen nib between two lyres Sable. Supporters Two Labrador retrievers Sable each gorged of a collar compony Argent and Sable pendent therefrom a closed book Or charged with a livestock brand composed of the letter E and the letter G contourné both ensigned by a quarter arc embowed Gules and standing on a rocky mount set with Pacific dogwood flowers and pine trees Proper all above barry wavy Argent and Gules. Motto Wisdom Compassion Justice |

McLachlin was made a commander of the Legion of Honour by the government of France in 2008. On December 15, 2006, she was appointed a commander of the Venerable Order of Saint John.

She was made a Companion of the Order of Canada in 2018, having demonstrated the highest degree of merit to Canada and humanity. Up to 15 Companions are appointed annually, with an imposed limit of 180 living Companions at any given time.

She has been awarded with over 31 honorary degrees from various universities, which include:

Honorary degrees
| Location | Date | School | Degree |
|---|---|---|---|
| British Columbia | 27 September 1990 | University of British Columbia | Doctor of Laws (LL.D.) |
| Alberta | 1991 | University of Alberta | Doctor of Laws (LL.D.) |
| Ontario | June 1995 | University of Toronto | Doctor of Laws (LL.D.) |
| Ontario | Spring 1999 | York University | Doctor of Laws (LL.D.) |
| Ontario | 2000 | Law Society of Upper Canada | Doctor of Laws (LL.D.) |
| British Columbia | 2000 | Simon Fraser University | Doctor of Laws (LL.D.) |
| Alberta | 2000 | University of Calgary | |
| Ontario | 8 June 2000 | Brock University | Doctor of Laws (LL.D.) |
| British Columbia | November 2000 | University of Victoria | Doctor of Laws (LL.D.) |
| Alberta | Spring 2001 | University of Lethbridge | Doctor of Laws (LL.D.) |
| Nova Scotia | 2002 | Mount Saint Vincent University | Doctor of Humane Letters (DHL) |
| Prince Edward Island | 2002 | University of Prince Edward Island | Doctor of Laws (LL.D.) |
| Quebec | 2003 | Université de Montréal | Doctorate |
| Nova Scotia | 2004 | Dalhousie University | Doctor of Laws (LL.D.) |
| (United Kingdom) Northern Ireland | 2004 | Queen's University Belfast | Doctor of Laws (LL.D.) |
| Manitoba | 27 May 2004 | University of Manitoba | Doctor of Laws (LL.D.) |
| Ontario | 14 November 2004 | Carleton University | Doctor of Laws (LL.D.) |
| Maine | 7 May 2005 | University of Maine at Fort Kent | Doctor of Humane Letters (DHL) |
| Philippines | 2006 | Ateneo de Manila University | Doctor of Laws (LL.D.) |
| Ontario | 18 June 2010 | University of Windsor | Doctor of Civil Law (DCL) |
| Ontario | 2010 | Ryerson University | Doctor of Laws (LL.D.) |
| Nova Scotia | 2010 | Cape Breton University | Doctor of Laws (LL.D.) |
| Ontario | 2011 | Queen's University | Doctor of Laws (LL.D.) |
| Quebec | June 2011 | Concordia University | Doctor of Laws (LL.D.) |
| Ontario | 26 October 2012 | University of Western Ontario | Doctor of Civil Law (DCL) |
| Ontario | 2012 | Lakehead University | Doctor of Laws (LL.D.) |
| Scotland | 2014 | University of Edinburgh | Doctorate |
| Quebec | 2015 | Bishop's University | Doctor of Civil Law (DCL) |
| Ontario | 31 May 2016 | Laurentian University | Doctor of Laws (LL.D.) |
| Quebec | 1 June 2016 | McGill University | Doctor of Laws (LL.D.) |
| Alberta | 28 April 2017 | Lethbridge College | Bachelor of Applied Arts |
| Newfoundland and Labrador | 19 October 2017 | Memorial University of Newfoundland | Doctor of Laws (LL.D.) |
| Ontario | 2019 | University of Ontario Institute of Technology | Doctor of Laws (LL.D.) |

=== Memberships and fellowships ===
McLachlin is the honorary patron of the Institute of Parliamentary and Political Law.

| Country | Date | Organisation | Position |
|---|---|---|---|
| Canada | March 2011 | Royal Heraldry Society of Canada | Vice patron |
| United States of America | | American College of Trial Lawyers | Honorary fellow |

== Publications ==
- McLachlin, Beverley (2020). Truth Be Told: The Story of My Life and My Fight for Equality. Simon & Schuster. ISBN 978-1-982104-97-9.

=== Fiction ===
- McLachlin, Beverley (2019). Full Disclosure. New York: Simon & Schuster. ISBN 978-1-5011-7279-3.
- McLachlin, Beverley (2021). Denial. New York: Simon & Schuster. ISBN 978-1-982105-01-3.
- McLachlin, Beverley (2024). Proof. New York: Simon & Schuster. ISBN 978-1-66800-361-9.

=== General legal articles ===
- McLachlin, Beverley M.; Wallace, Wilfred J. (1987). The Canadian Law of Architecture and Engineering. Toronto: Butterworths. ISBN 978-0-433-39160-9.
- McLachlin, Beverley (June 2010). "Judging the 'Vanishing Trial' in the Construction Industry". Construction Law International. 5 (2): 9–14.

=== On the Charter ===
- McLachlin, Beverley (1990). "The Role of the Court in the Post-Charter Era: Policy-Maker or Adjudicator?". University of New Brunswick Law Journal. 39: 43–64.
- McLachlin, Beverley (1991). "The Charter: A New Role for the Judiciary". Alberta Law Review. 29 (3): 540–559. doi:10.29173/alr1544. ISSN 1925-8356.
- McLachlin, Beverley (2007). "The Charter 25 Years Later: The Good, the Bad, and the Challenges". Osgoode Hall Law Journal. 45 (2): 365–377. doi:10.60082/2817-5069.1245. S2CID 146383118.

== See also ==
- 1989 judgments of the Supreme Court of Canada

Legal offices
| Preceded by None | Non-Permanent Judge of the Court of Final Appeal of Hong Kong; 2018–2024 | Succeeded by None |
Order of precedence
| Preceded by Justin Trudeau as Former Prime Minister | Order of Precedence of Canada as Former Chief Justice | Succeeded by Raymonde Gagné as Speaker of the Senate of Canada |
