= Chris Axworthy =

Canadian politician (1947–2023)

The Honourable Chris Axworthy ECS KC

Member of the Saskatchewan Legislative Assembly for Saskatoon Fairview
- In office June 28, 1999 – March 17, 2003
- Preceded by: Bob Mitchell
- Succeeded by: Andy Iwanchuk

Member of Parliament for Saskatoon—Rosetown—Biggar Saskatoon—Clark's Crossing (1988–1997)
- In office November 21, 1988 – June 1, 1999
- Preceded by: Ray Hnatyshyn
- Succeeded by: Dennis Gruending

Personal details
- Born: March 10, 1947 Plymouth, England
- Died: August 11, 2023 (aged 76) Ottawa, Ontario, Canada
- Party: Liberal Party of Canada (2004–2006); New Democratic Party (1988–2003)

Christopher S. Axworthy, KC (March 10, 1947 – August 11, 2023) was a Canadian politician and academic.

== Law professor ==
After teaching law at the University of New Brunswick and Dalhousie Law School, Chris Axworthy came to Saskatoon in 1984 as the founding executive director of the Centre for the Study of Co-operatives and as a professor of law at the University of Saskatchewan. In 2003 he returned to the University of Saskatchewan as a professor of law, where he taught until the spring of 2008.

In the spring of 2008, he was appointed Dean of Robson Hall at the University of Manitoba for a five-year term beginning on July 1, 2008. He was also the President of the Institute of Parliamentary and Political Law.

In May 2010, Axworthy assumed the position as the Founding Dean of Law at Thompson Rivers University's new law school, which opened in Fall 2011. On July 15, 2013, he resigned this position.

== Political career ==
Axworthy was elected as a Saskatchewan Member of Parliament for the New Democratic Party in 1988 and was re-elected in 1993 and 1997.

Axworthy resigned from the House of Commons on June 1, 1999, to join the cabinet of then Saskatchewan Premier Roy Romanow. He was elected as an MLA in a by-election as the Saskatchewan NDP MLA for the constituency of Saskatoon-Fairview with 64% of the vote. He was also re-elected three months later in a general election that same year. He served as Attorney General and Minister of Justice, Minister of Aboriginal Affairs and Minister of Intergovernmental Affairs. After Romanow stepped down, Axworthy ran against Lorne Calvert in the 2001 Saskatchewan New Democratic Party leadership election and finished second. Axworthy, who was still serving as Justice Minister, resigned as MLA in January 2003.

Although he had been an NDP member for his entire political career, Axworthy announced his bid for the Liberal nomination in the riding of Saskatoon—Wanuskewin on March 5, 2004. He received 32.58% of the vote, but lost to incumbent Conservative MP, Maurice Vellacott. He lost to Vellacott a second time in the 2006 federal election.

== Personal life and death ==
Axworthy was born in Plymouth, England on March 10, 1947. He died from cancer on August 11, 2023, at the age of 76.

== Electoral results ==
=== Federal ===
2006 Canadian federal election: Saskatoon—Wanuskewin
Party	Candidate	Votes	%	±%	Expenditures
Conservative	Maurice Vellacott	17,753	49.39	+2.74	$62,331.71
Liberal	Chris Axworthy	8,655	24.08	−8.50	$52,437.43
New Democratic	Jim Maddin	7,939	22.09	+4.27	$35,098.35
Green	Don Cameron	1,292	3.59	+0.63	$880.29
Christian Heritage	Dale Sanders	307	0.85	−0.90	$1,552.99
Total valid votes		35,946	100.00		
Total rejected ballots		96	0.27	+0.03	
Turnout		36,042	67.35	+7.63	
Electors on the lists		53,513			

2004 Canadian federal election: Saskatoon—Wanuskewin
Party	Candidate	Votes	%	±%	Expenditures
Conservative	Maurice Vellacott	15,109	46.64	−11.09	$66,433.82
Liberal	Chris Axworthy	10,553	32.58	+15.76	$72,269.97
New Democratic	Priscilla Settee	5,770	17.81	−6.42	$38,635.22
Green	David Greenfield	960	2.96	+1.75	$25.00
Total valid votes		32,392	100.00		
Total rejected ballots		76	0.23	−0.03	
Turnout		32,468	59.72	−1.90	
Electors on the lists		54,366			
Percentage change figures are factored for redistribution. Conservative Party percentages are contrasted with the combined Canadian Alliance and Progressive Conservative percentages from 2000.
Sources: Official Results, Elections Canada and Financial Returns, Elections Canada.

1997 Canadian federal election
Party	Candidate	Votes	%	Expenditures
New Democratic	Chris Axworthy	12,095	43.72	$56,131
Reform	Elwin Hermanson	9,011	32.57	$33,126
Liberal	Tanyss Munro	4,438	16.04	$37,991
Progressive Conservative	Richard Gabruch	1,931	6.98	$11,361
Canadian Action	Rick Barsky	191	0.69	$1,760
Total valid votes/Expense limit		27,666	100.00	$58,640
Total rejected ballots		113	0.41	
Turnout		27,779	59.9	

1993 Canadian federal election: Saskatoon—Clark's Crossing
Party	Candidate	Votes
New Democratic	Chris Axworthy	11,587
Reform	Frederick Wesolowski	10,376
Liberal	Roy Norris	10,226
Progressive Conservative	Peter McCann	3,668
National	Henry Garman	604
Natural Law	Patrick James Coulterman	185
Independent	Rhys Frostad	109
Canada Party	Shawn Cawley	71

1988 Canadian federal election: Saskatoon—Clark's Crossing
Party	Candidate	Votes
New Democratic	Chris Axworthy	19,889
Progressive Conservative	Ray Hnatyshyn	14,847
Liberal	Bill Patrick	6,554
Green	Keith A. Morvick	222

=== Provincial ===
1999 Saskatchewan general election
Party	Candidate	Votes	%	±%
NDP	Chris Axworthy	2,653	56.68	-7.55
Saskatchewan	Sandra Rees	1,137	24.29	+3.11
Liberal	Barry Anderson	649	13.86	+1.67
Prog. Conservative	Gwen Katzman	153	3.27	-
New Green	Lynn Oliphant	89	1.90	-0.50
Total		4,681	100.00	

June 28, 1999 By-Election: Saskatoon Fairview
Party	Candidate	Votes	%	±%
NDP	Chris Axworthy	1,871	64.23	-0.56
Saskatchewan	Harry Meyers	617	21.18	*
Liberal	Barry Anderson	355	12.19	-12.70
New Green	Neil Sinclair	70	2.40	*
Total		2,913	100.00	

Saskatchewan provincial government of Lorne Calvert
Cabinet posts (3)
Predecessor	Office	Successor
Pat Lorje	Minister of Aboriginal Affairs; October 12, 2001 – January 21, 2003	Ron Osika
Ron Osika; Roy Romanow	Minister of Intergovernmental Affairs; December 5, 2002 – January 21, 2003; February 8, 2001 – March 26, 2002	Ron Osika; Ron Osika
cont'd from Romanow Ministry	Minister of Justice and Attorney General; February 8, 2001 – January 21, 2003	John Nilson
Saskatchewan provincial government of Roy Romanow
Cabinet post (1)
Predecessor	Office	Successor
John Nilson	Minister of Justice and Attorney General; September 30, 1999 – February 8, 2001	cont'd into Calvert Ministry
