= National Farmers Union (Canada) =

- Union Nationale des Fermiers
- Founded: 1969
- Headquarters: Saskatoon, Saskatchewan
- Location: Canada
- Members: 3000+
- Website: http://www.nfu.ca

The National Farmers Union of Canada (NFU) is an National organization which represents the demands of Canadian farmers to achieve policy and reform. It is headquartered in Saskatoon, Saskatchewan, Canada. Descended from the United Farmers of Canada, a loose federation of militant farmers' organizations, it was created as the Interprovincial Farm Union Council (IFUC) in 1945 to co-ordinate activities between provincial bodies, particularly the Alberta Farmers Union and the United Farmers of Canada (Saskatchewan Section) who were planning a farmers' strike if grievances on farm prices and marketing problems were not solved. In 1960 it was renamed the National Farmers Union and in 1969 it was refounded with a national convention as a direct membership organization.

The NFU decides on and publicizes its positions on matters concerning agricultural policy through news briefs and some longer policy statements. Recent policy statements include the Policy on Genetically Modified (GM) Foods and the Policy on Sustainable Agriculture.

== History ==
Canada's farmers were originally represented by a collection of regional farmers unions, including the Saskatchewan Farmers Union, the Ontario Farmers Union, the Farmers Union of British Columbia, and the Farmers Union of Alberta. They found themselves at a disadvantage on the national bargaining table, so a coalition of regional representatives was formed, called the National Farmers Union Council. Eventually they recognized the potential for a national front and, at a joint meeting in Winnipeg in March 1968, they passed a motion to develop a constitution. Soon after, in July 1969, the direct membership National Farmers Union was formed.

The NFU has since focused its efforts on a wide range of issues affecting farmers under the title of food sovereignty including justice, sustainability, and equity, all while pushing for a network of family farms across Canada.

== Food sovereignty ==
The National Farmers Union work within the global movement, La Via Campesina, in opposition to global trade agreements and the World Trade Organization, stop the destruction of communities, cultures and environments, and advocate for food sovereignty.

== Membership ==
The NFU has 3 options for membership. The Family Farm Membership allows all members of the farm, ages 14 and up, to be full voting members of the union. The youth membership enables farmers from ages 21–25 to join. The Associate Membership is for non-farmers. It gives the public a voice at the NFU with all abilities apart from voting at conventions.

== Mandate ==
The mandate of the National Farmers Union is:

- to promote the betterment of farmers in the attainment of their economic and social goals
- to conduct projects for the benefit of farmers in the development of markets for and marketing of farm products
- to achieve the reduction of costs and other measures designed to increase the economic benefits of farming
- to conduct educational and research projects for the benefit of farmers
- to promote and secure legislation and other forms of government action for the benefit of farmers
- to promote a higher standard of community life in agriculture
- to provide services for its members consistent with its objects and work jointly with any other person or organizations for the attainment of its objects.

== Essay contest ==
The NFU offers an annual award to young writers for an essay on an assigned farm-related topic, the Paul Beingessner Award.
