= Saskatoon—Clark's Crossing =

Former federal electoral district in Saskatchewan, Canada

Saskatoon—Clark's Crossing was a federal electoral district in the province of Saskatchewan, Canada, that was represented in the House of Commons of Canada from 1988 to 1997. This riding was created in 1987 from parts of Saskatoon West riding.

The electoral district was abolished in 1996 when it was redistributed between Saskatoon—Rosetown and Wanuskewin ridings.

== Electoral history ==
1988 Canadian federal election
Party	Candidate	Votes
New Democratic	Chris Axworthy	19,889
Progressive Conservative	Ray Hnatyshyn	14,847
Liberal	Bill Patrick	6,554
Green	Keith A. Morvick	222

1993 Canadian federal election
Party	Candidate	Votes
New Democratic	Chris Axworthy	11,587
Reform	Frederick Wesolowski	10,376
Liberal	Roy Norris	10,226
Progressive Conservative	Peter McCann	3,668
National	Henry Garman	604
Natural Law	Patrick James Coulterman	185
Independent	Rhys Frostad	109
Canada Party	Shawn Cawley	71

== See also ==
- List of Canadian electoral districts
- Historical federal electoral districts of Canada
