= Saskatoon—Wanuskewin =

Former federal electoral district in Saskatchewan, Canada

Saskatchewan electoral district
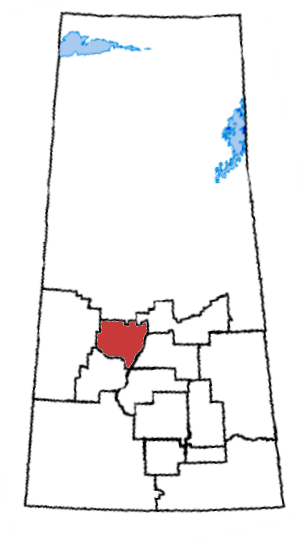
- Saskatoon—Wanuskewin in relation to other Saskatchewan federal electoral districts
- Coordinates: 52.624°N 106.890°W

Defunct federal electoral district
- Legislature: House of Commons
- District created: 1996
- District abolished: 2013
- First contested: 1997
- Last contested: 2011
- District webpage: profile, map

Demographics
- Population (2011): 82,553
- Electors (2011): 55,327
- Area (km²): 10,233.82
- Census division(s): Saskatoon
- Census subdivision(s): Saskatoon, Corman Park No. 344, Martensville, Warman

Saskatoon—Wanuskewin was a federal electoral district (also called riding) in Saskatchewan, Canada, that was represented in the House of Commons of Canada from 1997 to 2015. (In the Cree language: ᐋᐧᓇᐢᑫᐃᐧᐣ / wânaskêwin means, "being at peace with oneself".) It covered a part of the city of Saskatoon.

== Geography ==
The riding included the northwest quadrant of Saskatoon and extended north past Duck Lake, northwest past Lucky Man and west past Ruddell. The riding also included the cities of Warman and Martensville.

== History ==
It was created in 1996 as "Wanuskewin" from Saskatoon—Clark's Crossing and portions of Kindersley—Lloydminster, Prince Albert—Churchill River and The Battlefords—Meadow Lake ridings.

In 2000, it was renamed "Saskatoon—Wanuskewin".

The electoral district was abolished in 2013 and now is contained within the bounds of Carlton Trail—Eagle Creek.

== Members of Parliament ==
Parliament	Years	Member	Party
Wanuskewin; Riding created from Saskatoon—Clark's Crossing, Kindersley—Lloydminster, Prince Albert—Churchill River and The Battlefords—Meadow Lake
36th	1997–2000	Maurice Vellacott	Reform
36th	2000–2000	Maurice Vellacott	Alliance
Riding renamed — Saskatoon—Wanuskewin
37th	2000–2003	Maurice Vellacott	Alliance
37th	2003–2004	Maurice Vellacott	Conservative
38th	2004–2006	Maurice Vellacott	Conservative
39th	2006–2008	Maurice Vellacott	Conservative
40th	2008–2011	Maurice Vellacott	Conservative
41st	2011–2015	Maurice Vellacott	Conservative
Riding dissolved into Carlton Trail—Eagle Creek, Saskatoon West, Prince Albert and Desnethé—Missinippi—Churchill River

== Election results ==
=== Saskatoon—Wanuskewin ===
2011 Canadian federal election
Party	Candidate	Votes	%	±%	Expenditures
Conservative	Maurice Vellacott	21,183	58.43	+1.92	$34,890
New Democratic	John Parry	11,395	31.43	+7.07	$16,104
Liberal	Patricia Zipchen	2,428	6.70	-5.70	$15,022
Green	Mark Bigland-Pritchard	1,250	3.45	-3.28	$991
Total valid votes/Expense limit		36,256	100.00		$83,569
Total rejected ballots		134	0.37	+0.06	
Turnout		36,390	64.33	+5.55	
Eligible voters		56,570	–	–	

2008 Canadian federal election
Party	Candidate	Votes	%	±%	Expenditures
Conservative	Maurice Vellacott	18,320	56.51	+7.12	$36,224
New Democratic	Clint Davidson	7,898	24.36	+2.28	$20,679
Liberal	Patricia Zipchen	4,020	12.40	-11.68	$13,240
Green	Tobi-Dawne Smith	2,182	6.73	+3.14	$3,675
Total valid votes/Expense limit		32,420	100.00		$80,396
Total rejected ballots		100	0.31	+0.04	
Turnout		32,520	58.78	-8.57	

2006 Canadian federal election
Party	Candidate	Votes	%	±%	Expenditures
Conservative	Maurice Vellacott	17,753	49.39	+2.74	$62,331.71
Liberal	Chris Axworthy	8,655	24.08	−8.50	$52,437.43
New Democratic	Jim Maddin	7,939	22.09	+4.27	$35,098.35
Green	Don Cameron	1,292	3.59	+0.63	$880.29
Christian Heritage	Dale Sanders	307	0.85	−0.90	$1,552.99
Total valid votes		35,946	100.00		
Total rejected ballots		96	0.27	+0.03	
Turnout		36,042	67.35	+7.63	
Electors on the lists		53,513			

2004 Canadian federal election
Party	Candidate	Votes	%	±%	Expenditures
Conservative	Maurice Vellacott	15,109	46.64	−11.09	$66,433.82
Liberal	Chris Axworthy	10,553	32.58	+15.76	$72,269.97
New Democratic	Priscilla Settee	5,770	17.81	−6.42	$38,635.22
Green	David Greenfield	960	2.96	+1.75	$25.00
Total valid votes		32,392	100.00		
Total rejected ballots		76	0.23	−0.03	
Turnout		32,468	59.72	−1.90	
Electors on the lists		54,366			
Percentage change figures are factored for redistribution. Conservative Party percentages are contrasted with the combined Canadian Alliance and Progressive Conservative percentages from 2000.
Sources: Official Results, Elections Canada and Financial Returns, Elections Canada.

2000 Canadian federal election
Party	Candidate	Votes	%	±%	Expenditures
Alliance	Maurice Vellacott	17,404	52.57	+13.42	$59,707.59
New Democratic	Hugh Walker	8,022	24.23	−2.55	$34,545.31
Liberal	Bill Patrick	5,567	16.82	−7.61	$16,493.01
Progressive Conservative	Kirk Eggum	1,709	5.16	−2.76	$0.00
Green	David Greenfield	402	1.21		$0.00
Total valid votes		33,104	100.00		
Total rejected ballots		86	0.26	−0.08	
Turnout		33,190	61.62	−2.17	
Electors on the lists		53,862			
Sources: Official Results, Elections Canada and Financial Returns, Elections Canada.

=== Wanuskewin ===
1997 Canadian federal election: Wanuskewin
Party	Candidate	Votes	%	Expenditures
Reform	Maurice Vellacott	12,854	39.16	$39,845
New Democratic	Walter Kyliuk	8,793	26.79	$57,104
Liberal	Tom Hengen	8,020	24.43	$35,221
Progressive Conservative	Ron Meakin	2,602	7.93	$7,207
Independent	Sam Dyck	420	1.28	$1,781
Natural Law	Patrick J. Coulterman	138	0.42	$61
Total valid votes		32,827	100.00	
Total rejected ballots		112	0.34	
Turnout		32,939	63.79	
Electors on the lists		51,635		
Sources: Official Results, Elections Canada and Financial Returns, Elections Canada.

== See also ==
- List of Canadian electoral districts
- Historical federal electoral districts of Canada
