= Saskatchewan Highway 363 =

Provincial highway in Saskatchewan, Canada

Highway 363

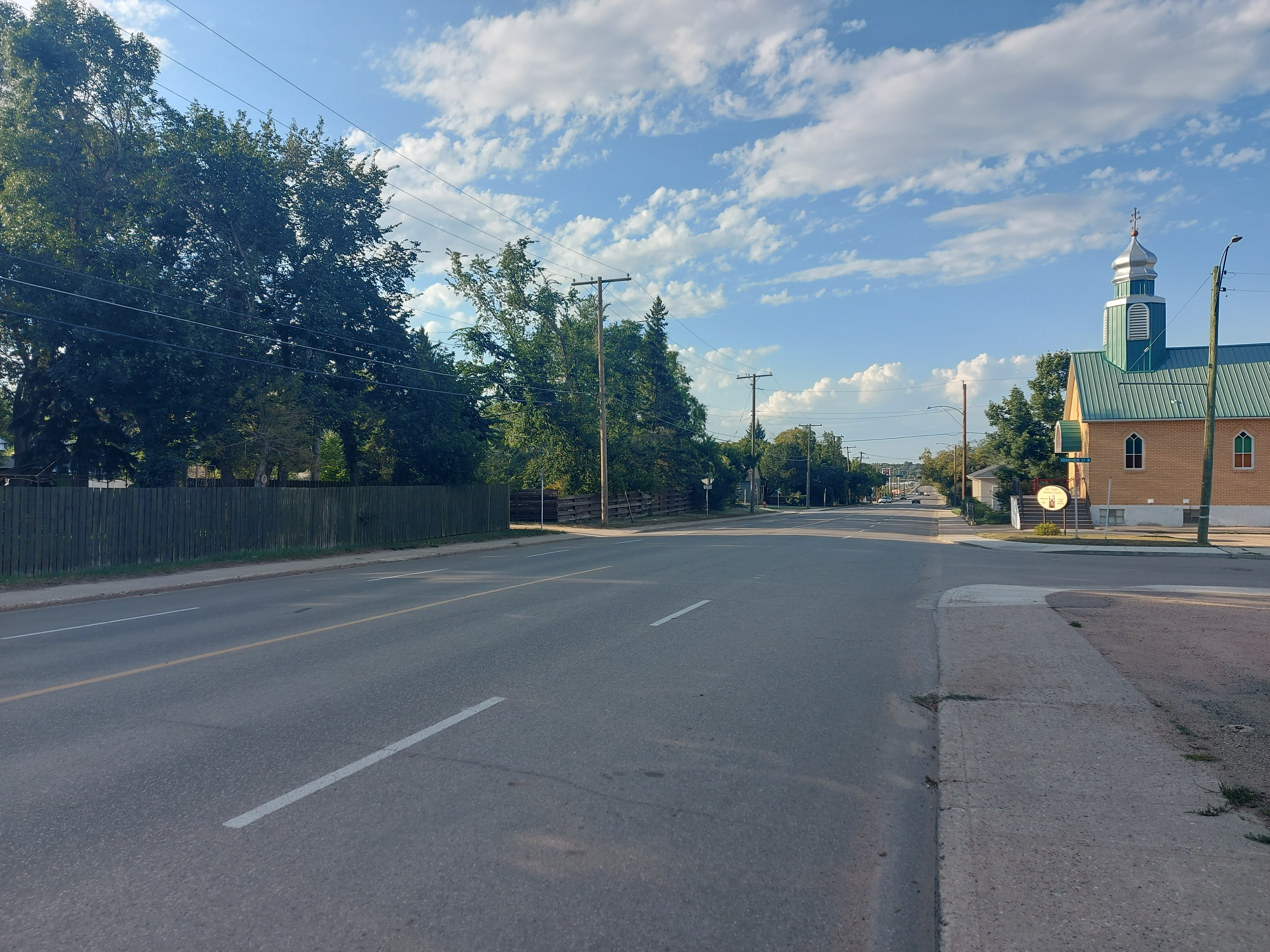
- Highway 363 through Moose Jaw

Route information
- Maintained by Ministry of Highways and Infrastructure
- Length: 199.8 km (124.1 mi)

Major junctions
- West end: Highway 4 near Swift Current
- Highway 19 at Hodgeville; Highway 58 near Shamrock
- East end: Highway 2 in Moose Jaw

Location
- Country: Canada
- Province: Saskatchewan
- Rural municipalities: Swift Current, Coulee, Lawtonia, Shamrock, Rodgers, Hillsborough, Caron, Moose Jaw

Highway system
- Provincial highways in Saskatchewan
← Highway 362	→ Highway 364

Highway 363 is a provincial highway in Saskatchewan, Canada. It runs from Highway 4 to Highway 2 in Moose Jaw. At about 200 kilometres (120 mi) long, it is the longest of the 300-series highways in the province.

Highway 363 passes near the communities of Rosenhof, Neidpath, Hallonquist, Hodgeville, Kelstern, Shamrock, Trewdale, Coderre, Courval, Old Wives, Abound, and Valley Ridge. Access to Shamrock Regional Park is also from the highway.

== Route description ==
Hwy 363 begins in the Rural Municipality of Swift Current No. 137 at an intersection with Hwy 4 a couple kilometres to the south of the city of Swift Current. It heads east through rural farmland for a few kilometres to enter the Rural Municipality of Coulee No. 136, travelling just to the north of Rosenhof (connected via Range Road 3123) and crossing several small creeks (including Rushlake Creek) before making an abrupt right turn to the south at a junction with Hwy 720 at the hamlet of Neidpath, passing through the hamlet of Hallonquist to cross both a former railway line and Wiwa Creek before making an abrupt left turn at the junction between Hwy 609 and Hwy 721. Entering the Rural Municipality of Lawtonia No. 135, the highway travels just to the south of the locality of Dendron as it heads east through rural areas to travel through the southern portions of the village of Hodgeville, where it shares a short concurrency with Hwy 19 and crossing Wiwa Creek for a second time. Leaving Hodgeville, Hwy 363 travels through rural farmland for several kilometres, meeting an access road to St. Boswells (Range Road 3071) before entering the Rural Municipality of Shamrock No. 134.

Hwy 363 immediately goes through a long switchback as it travels through the hamlet of Kelstern, where it crosses a former railway line, before continuing eastward towards the village of Shamrock via an abrupt right hand turn. Travelling along the north side of Shamrock, it becomes concurrent with eastbound Hwy 58 for around 5 kilometres (3.1 mi) before Hwy 363 splits off and continues east, having an intersection with Range Road 3054 (provides access to Shamrock Regional Park) and crossing into the Rural Municipality of Rodgers No. 133. The highway shares a short concurrency with Hwy 627 just north of the village of Coderre, which the pair cross a bridge over Chaplin Creek, before Hwy 363 heads east along the northern coastline of Old Wives Lake, passing through Courval and entering the Rural Municipality of Hillsborough No. 132. Pulling away from the lake, it winds its way northeast through a series switchbacks, traversing hilly terrain for several kilometres into the Rural Municipality of Caron No. 162, passing through farmland and making a sharp curve to the east, entering the Rural Municipality of Moose Jaw No. 161.

After traversing rural areas, Hwy 363 enters the city of Moose Jaw at a T-intersection with 9th Avenue SW just north of Bushell Park, turning left and running along the banks of the Moose Jaw River into some neighbourhoods, where it makes a right onto Lillooet Street W. After passing through an industrial area, it makes a left onto 4th Avenue SW, crossing the Thunderbird Viaduct over Thunder Creek and a rail yard before curving onto Manitoba Street W, entering downtown. After several blocks, Hwy 363 comes to an end at an intersection with Hwy 2 (Manitoba Street E / Main Street N). With the exclusion of the portion of the route along Manitoba Street, which is a four-lane divided boulevard, the entire length of Hwy 363 is a two-lane highway, all of which is paved.

== Manitoba Street Expressway ==
Highway 363 travels down Manitoba Street and the Manitoba Street Expressway, an arterial road in Moose Jaw. Highway 363 ends at Main Street (Highway 2) in downtown Moose Jaw, but Manitoba Street continues east to connect with Highway 1 (Trans-Canada Highway) on the eastern edge of the city.

== Major intersections ==
From west to east:

Rural municipality	Location	km	mi	Destinations	Notes
Swift Current No. 137		0.0	0.0	Highway 4 – Cadillac, Swift Current	Hwy 363 western terminus
Coulee No. 136		12.2	7.6	Range Road 3123 – Waldeck	
Coulee No. 136		13.0	8.1	Range Road 3123 – Rosenhof	
Coulee No. 136		20.4– 21.1	12.7– 13.1	Highway 628 (Range Road 3114) – Rush Lake, Burnham, Pambrun	
Coulee No. 136		28.5	17.7	Highfield Dam Road (Range Road 3105) – Highfield Reservoir	
Coulee No. 136	Neidpath	35.6	22.1	Highway 720 east – Neidpath	Hwy 363 branches south
Coulee No. 136	Hallonquist	47.8	29.7	Bridge over Wiwa Creek	
Coulee No. 136		48.6	30.2	Highway 609 south – Vanguard Highway 721 west – Rheinfeld	Hwy 363 branches east
Lawtonia No. 135	Hodgeville	69.8	43.4	Highway 19 south – Kincaid	Hwy 363 branches north; south end of Hwy 19 concurrency
Lawtonia No. 135	Hodgeville	69.9	43.4	Bridge over Wiwa Creek	
Lawtonia No. 135	Hodgeville	70.2	43.6	Highway 19 north – Morse, Chaplin	Hwy 363 branches east; east end of Hwy 19 concurrency
Lawtonia No. 135		78.4	48.7	Range Road 3071 – St. Boswells	
Shamrock No. 134	Shamrock	100.9	62.7	Highway 58 north – Chaplin	West end of Hwy 58 concurrency
Shamrock No. 134		105.8	65.7	Highway 58 south – Gravelbourg	East end of Hwy 58 concurrency
Shamrock No. 134		112.3	69.8	Range Road 3054 – Shamrock Regional Park	
Rodgers No. 133		119.1	74.0	Highway 627 south – Coderre	West end of Hwy 627 concurrency
Rodgers No. 133		119.6	74.3	Bridge over Chaplin Creek	
Rodgers No. 133		127.1	79.0	Highway 627 north	East end of Hwy 627 concurrency
Rodgers No. 133	Courval	132.0	82.0	Range Road 3025 – Courval	
Rodgers No. 133		136.9	85.1	Highway 626 north – Mortlach	Southern terminus of Hwy 626
Hillsborough No. 132 Caron No. 162	No major junctions				
Moose Jaw No. 161		191.0	118.7	Range Road 2272 (32nd Avenue W) to Highway 1 (TCH)	
City of Moose Jaw		195.8	121.7	9th Avenue SW to Highway 2 south – Bushell Park	Hwy 363 branches north
City of Moose Jaw		199.8	124.1	Main Street (Highway 2 north) – Prince Albert	Hwy 363 eastern terminus
City of Moose Jaw		200.2	124.4	2nd Avenue E (Highway 2 south) – Assiniboia	
City of Moose Jaw		203.7	126.6	Highway 1 (TCH) – Swift Current, Regina	Interchange; westbound exit, eastbound entrance from Hwy 1
1.000 mi = 1.609 km; 1.000 km = 0.621 mi: Closed/former; Concurrency terminus

== See also ==
- Transportation in Saskatchewan
- Roads in Saskatchewan
