= Hallonquist =

Community in Saskatchewan, Canada

- Hamlet
- Location within Saskatchewan Location within Canada
- Coordinates: 50.1199001°N 107.2532515°W
- Country: Canada
- Province: Saskatchewan
- Region: Southwest
- Census division: 7
- Rural municipality: Coulee No. 136
- Established: 1923

Government
  - Governing body: Coulee No. 136 Council
- Elevation: 760 m (2,490 ft)

Population (2006)
  - Total: 15
- Time zone: CST
- Postal code: S0N 1S0
- Area code: 306
- Highways: Highway 363 / Highway 609 / Highway 721
- Waterways: Braddock Lake; Wiwa Creek

Hallonquist is a hamlet in the Rural Municipality of Coulee No. 136, Saskatchewan, Canada. The hamlet is located on Highway 363, about 21 kilometres (13 mi) west of Hodgeville.

== History ==
In 1923 the hamlet of Hallonquist was developed on a branch line of the Canadian Pacific Railway. It was named in honour of Joseph E. Hallonquist, a CPR clerk from Moose Jaw who had been decorated for bravery in World War I. He enlisted with the RAF and was credited with five aerial victories earning him the title of "Ace" and a Distinguished Flying Cross (RAF). Shot down over Germany he recuperated in a German hospital before being repatriated. In its heyday Hallonquist had two general stores, two restaurants, a blacksmith shop, a shoe repair shop, a lumber yard, two livery barns, a butcher shop, a pool hall, a barber shop, three oil agencies, three machine agencies and three elevators. Today, all that remains of the community is the Evangelical Lutheran Church. Also, every year Hallonquist has their amateur rodeo, a get-together for most of that area, including Swift Current.

== Demographics ==
In 2006, Hallonquist had a population of 15 living in 11 dwellings, a -21.1% decrease from 1996. The village had a land area of 1.71 km^{2} (0.66 sq mi) and a population density of 8.8/km^{2} (23/sq mi).

== See also ==
- List of communities in Saskatchewan
- List of hamlets in Saskatchewan
