= Old Wives =

Community in Saskatchewan, Canada

- Unincorporated community
- Location within Saskatchewan Location within Canada
- Coordinates: 50°12′00″N 106°00′02″W
- Country: Canada
- Province: Saskatchewan
- Region: Southwest
- Census division: Division No. 3
- Rural municipality: Hillsborough No. 132
- Post office Founded: 1912-01-01 (Closed 1969-10-10)

Government
  - Governing body: Hillsborough No. 132
- Time zone: CST
- Area code: 306
- Highways: Highway 363

Old Wives is an unincorporated community in the Rural Municipality of Hillsborough No. 132, Saskatchewan, Canada.

== History ==
The village that became Old Wives was formed about 1900, but it was not until 1929 that the community officially got the name. Mail delivery began 1911, when Tom Lundrigan began bringing in the mail from the post office in Mortlach. Eventually, a post office was open January 1, 1912, and remained open until it closed on October 10, 1969. The area was home to several schools, with the first opening in 1916. Bay Island School, officially Bay Island School District #4362, was a one-room school on Highway 363 just east of Old Wives, which served the community from 1919 to 1950. The building still stands today. The first general store in town opened in Mr. Bill Sheldon's house in 1920. In 1930 a new store was built at the town site and it would operate for nearly 40 years, before closing in 1968. In 1931 the CPR laid tracks from Archive to Shamrock and in 1933 a Saskatchewan Wheat Pool elevator was built alongside the tracks. On July 4, 1930, a De Havilland DH.60 Moth crashed on takeoff from Old Wives. The fate of the pilot is unknown but the aircraft was destroyed by the post-crash fire.

Old Wives has been a ghost town for several decades and while the town briefly prospered, the Great Depression and severe droughts in 1937, 1951, and 1959 began an irreversible downward spiral. Many businesses closed in the 1950s and 60s. The final nail in the coffin for the community came in 1973 when the railroad was abandoned, followed by the Pool elevator being moved to Bateman in 1975. Today, very little remains of Old Wives.

== Legend ==
Old Wives and nearby Old Wives Lake were named after a local Cree legend. According to traditional stories recounted by Métis guides accompanying the North-West Mounted Police in 1874, sometime around 1840 a band of Cree hunters followed a herd of buffalo into Blackfoot territory and made camp near the lake. Blackfoot scouts discovered this band and attacked. Although the Cree were able to defend themselves, they anticipated an attack by a larger Blackfoot war party the next morning. The older women volunteered to stay behind to tend the fires through the night in the hope of fooling the Blackfoot into believing that they were not abandoning their camp to escape. Using this diversion as cover, the rest of the Cree successfully fled back to their home territory in the Qu'Appelle valley. When the Blackfoot arrived that morning they found only the old women, whom the Blackfoot killed in vengeance. This commonly recited version of the lake's naming has been commemorated by a historical marker situated beside Highway 2 near the lake. A variant telling of this narrative states that the Blackfoot warriors were so impressed by the women's courage that they left them alone and allowed them to rejoin their own people. Another First Nations oral tradition describes how a band of Assiniboine fleeing from pursuing Blackfoot warriors abandoned the old women in their band who could not keep pace with everyone else. The women continued their effort to escape by wading across the lake. However, they misjudged the water's depth and drowned. An Assiniboine tradition associates the name with a battle which occurred at the lake around the beginning of the 19th century in which Assiniboines vanquished their Blackfoot enemies. According to some First Nations traditions, the spirits of the dead women continue to haunt a small island in the lake from which their voices can be heard at night.

== See also ==
- List of communities in Saskatchewan
