= Neidpath =

Neidpath may refer to:

- Neidpath Castle, Scotland
- Neidpath, Saskatchewan, Canada
