= Tom Fuller =

- Origin: Chicago, Illinois, U.S.
- Genres: Indie rock
- Occupation: Musician
- Years active: 2005-2024
- Labels: Redcap Records
- Website: tomfullermusic.com

Tom Fuller was an American rock musician from Chicago, based there, and influenced by Paul McCartney, Bon Jovi, and Bruce Springsteen. His first album Chasing an Illusion, was released in 2005. Abstract Man was released in 2009, and the track "Only in America" was in the top 10 on the US FMQB Radio Chart AC Format (sharing the honor with Coldplay, Kid Rock, and Maroon 5). The third album Ask, and the first single from the album, "Lovers", was released in the UK on September 5, 2011. A second single from the album, "Ask" was released in November 2011. He collaborated with Grammy Award-winning producer Rick Chudacoff on four albums, with Ask featuring Brian Ray and Abe Laboriel Jr of McCartney's band.

== Work ==
In 2014, Fuller released a brand new album FREEDOM accompanied with a suite of videos and a full color limited edition graphic novel. It was recorded in Nashville and Chicago, mixed at Fame Studios in Muscle Shoals, Alabama and mastered at Abbey Road Studios in London. The feature length collection of films and the graphic novel were created by renowned filmmakers Matt Silver, Steve Petchenik, and Andy Shore. They follow a narrative based on a clown subculture called The Sideshow (set in the not too distant future) led by The Ringmaster, an enigmatic character played by Fuller.

Tom Fuller has played shows with Tesla, Little Feat, Cowboy Mouth, dada, the Kyle Gass Band, Blue Öyster Cult, Robin Trower, Blues Traveler, Rusted Root, UFO Wishbone Ash, The Guess Who, Ted Nugent, and Night Ranger. The band has performed twice at Summerfest in Milwaukee, in 2012 and 2016. In February 2013, Fuller played a series of dates supporting Little Feat and Wishbone Ash. He performed at Paradiso in Amsterdam, Netherlands; O2's Shepherd's Bush Empire in London; Union House in Norwich, UK; Oosterpoort in Groningen, Netherlands; Gruenspan in Hamburg, Germany; Rosenhof in Kleinmaischeid, Germany; Zur Linde in Affalter, Germany; and Meier Music Hall in Braunschweig, Germany. In November 2014, Fuller supported Trampled By Turtles on a European tour. They performed at Kranhalle in Munich, Germany; Bang Bang Club in Berlin, Prinzenbar in Hamburg; Luxor in Cologne, Germany; La Maroquinerie in Paris; and at Paradiso in Amsterdam. In March 2017, Taylor Guitars announced that they added Tom Fuller to their Artist Relations roster.

Fuller's sixth album, Waterfall, was recorded in Nashville and mixed at Fame Studios in Muscle Shoals. The album was produced by Rick Chudacoff. Fuller died in March 2024.

== Discography ==
- Chasing an Illusion (2005)
- Abstract Man (2008)
- Maristar (2010)
- Ask (2011)
- Freedom (2014)
