= South Gnadenthal =

Community in Saskatchewan, Canada

- Hamlet
- Location within Saskatchewan Location within Canada
- Coordinates: 50.0667°N 107.5172°W
- Country: Canada
- Province: Saskatchewan
- Region: Southwest
- Census division: 7
- Rural municipality: Coulee No. 136

Government
  - Reeve: Greg Targerson
  - Administrator: Ken Hollinger
  - Governing body: Coulee No. 136

Population (2006)
  - Total: 0
- Time zone: CST
- Postal code: S9H 1K8
- Area code: 306
- Highways: Highway 721

South Gnadenthal is a hamlet in the Rural Municipality of Coulee No. 136, Saskatchewan, Canada. The hamlet is located on Highway 721, about 35 kilometres (22 mi) southeast of Swift Current.

== See also ==
- List of communities in Saskatchewan
- List of hamlets in Saskatchewan
