= St. Boswells, Saskatchewan =

Community in Saskatchewan, Canada

St. Boswells
- Hamlet
- Location within Saskatchewan Location within Canada
- Coordinates: 50.050°N 106.8339°W
- Country: Canada
- Province: Saskatchewan
- Region: Southwest
- Census division: 3
- Rural municipality: Glen Bain No. 105
- Established: 1918

Government
  - Reeve: Ross Turnbull
  - Administrator: Marilyn Scheller
  - Governing body: Glen Bain No. 105

Population (2006)
  - Total: 0
- Time zone: CST
- Postal code: S0N 2G0
- Area code: 306
- Highways: Range road 124

St. Boswells is a hamlet in the Rural Municipality of Glen Bain No. 105, Saskatchewan, Canada. The hamlet is about 8 km east of Highway 19, and about 25 km northwest of the town of Gravelbourg. Very little remains of the former village except sidewalks which mark the once prosperous business section of St. Boswells.

== History ==
St. Boswells was a railroad town founded in 1918, as a Canadian National Railway point along the line from Moose Jaw to Neidpath, though the surrounding area had been settled at least a decade earlier. Named after Alex Dow's, hometown of St. Boswells, Roxburghshire, Scotland. St. Boswells was chosen as the name for the community's first post office.

== See also ==
- Scottish place names in Canada
- List of communities in Saskatchewan
- List of hamlets in Saskatchewan
