= Lillestrom, Saskatchewan =

Locality in Saskatchewan, Canada

Lillestrom
- Interactive map of Lillestrom
- Coordinates: 50°16′0″N 105°52′2″W
- Country: Canada
- Province: Saskatchewan
- Region: Southwest
- Rural municipality: Hillsborough No. 132
- Elevation: 750 m (2,460 ft)
- Time zone: UTC−6 (CST)

Lillestrom is a locality in the Canadian province of Saskatchewan, located in the Rural Municipality of Hillsborough No. 132. The name is said to derive from a battle in Lille, France, during the First World War. It may also be named after Lillestrøm, a town in Norway.

== See also ==
- List of communities in Saskatchewan
- List of hamlets in Saskatchewan
