= Rheinfeld =

Community in Saskatchewan, Canada

- Hamlet
- Location within Saskatchewan Location within Canada
- Coordinates: 50.1167°N 107.5672°W
- Country: Canada
- Province: Saskatchewan
- Region: Southwest
- Census division: 7
- Rural municipality: Coulee No. 136

Government
  - Reeve: Greg Targerson
  - Administrator: Ken Hollinger
  - Governing body: Coulee No. 136

Population (2006)
  - Total: 0
- Time zone: CST
- Postal code: S9H 1K8
- Area code: 306
- Highways: Highway 379; Highway 721

Rheinfeld is a hamlet in the Rural Municipality of Coulee No. 136, Saskatchewan, Canada. The hamlet is located on Highway 628 about 9 kilometres (5.6 mi) north of Highway 363, and about 15 kilometres (9.3 mi) south of Swift Current.

== Demographics ==
In 2006, Rheinfeld had a population of 9 living in 4 dwellings, a 25% decrease from 2015. The hamlet had a land area of 0.00 km^{2} (0 sq mi) and a population density of 0/km^{2} (0/sq mi).

== See also ==
- List of communities in Saskatchewan
- List of hamlets in Saskatchewan
