= Rural Municipality of Coulee No. 136 =

Rural municipality in Saskatchewan, Canada

Coulee No. 136
- Rural municipality
- Rural Municipality of Coulee No. 136

- Location of the RM of Coulee No. 136 in Saskatchewan
- Coordinates: 50.179°N 107.442°W
- Country: Canada
- Province: Saskatchewan
- Census division: 7
- SARM division: 3
- Formed: December 12, 1910

Government
  - Reeve: Greg Targerson
  - Governing body: RM of Coulee No. 136 Council
  - Administrator: Tammy Knight
  - Office location: Swift Current

Area (2021)
  - Land: 840.54 km^{2} (324.53 sq mi)

Population (2021)
  - Total: 669
  - Density: 0.8/km^{2} (2.1/sq mi)
- Time zone: CST
  - Summer (DST): CST
- Area codes: 306 and 639
- Highway(s): Highway 363; Highway 609; Highway 721; Highway 739
- Waterway(s): Braddock Lake; Highfield Reservoir

The Rural Municipality of Coulee No. 136 (2016 population: 669) is a rural municipality (RM) in the Canadian province of Saskatchewan within Census Division No. 7 and SARM Division No. 3. The RM is located in the southwest portion of the province, southeast of the city of Swift Current.

== History ==
The RM of Coulee No. 136 incorporated as a rural municipality on December 12, 1910.

== Geography ==
=== Communities and localities ===
The following unincorporated communities are within the RM.

Organized hamlets

- Chortitz

Localities

- Braddock
- Burnham
- Hallonquist
- McMahon
- Neidpath
- Rheinfeld
- Rosenhof
- Rosenort
- South Gnadenthal

== Demographics ==
Population history (1981–2016)
Year	Pop.	±%
1981	755	—
1986	736	−2.5%
1991	663	−9.9%
1996	584	−11.9%
2001	559	−4.3%
2006	509	−8.9%
2011	582	+14.3%
2016	563	−3.3%
2021	669	+18.8%
Source: Statistics Canada via Saskatchewan Bureau of Statistics

In the 2021 Census of Population conducted by Statistics Canada, the RM of Coulee No. 136 had a population of 669 living in 182 of its 206 total private dwellings, a change of 18.8% from its 2016 population of 563. With a land area of 840.54 km^{2} (324.53 sq mi), it had a population density of 0.8/km^{2} (2.1/sq mi) in 2021.

In the 2016 Census of Population, the RM of Coulee No. 136 recorded a population of 563 living in 183 of its 205 total private dwellings, a −3.3% change from its 2011 population of 582. With a land area of 843.69 km^{2} (325.75 sq mi), it had a population density of 0.7/km^{2} (1.7/sq mi) in 2016.

== Government ==
The RM of Coulee No. 136 is governed by an elected municipal council and an appointed administrator that meets on the second Wednesday of every month. The reeve of the RM is Greg Targerson while its administrator is Tammy Knight. The RM's office is located in Swift Current.

== See also ==
- List of rural municipalities in Saskatchewan
