= Rosenhof =

Community in Saskatchewan, Canada

- Hamlet
- Location within Saskatchewan Location within Canada
- Coordinates: 50.2167°N 107.5672°W
- Country: Canada
- Province: Saskatchewan
- Region: Southwest
- Census division: 7
- Rural municipality: Coulee No. 136

Government
  - Reeve: Greg Targerson
  - Administrator: Ken Hollinger
  - Governing body: Coulee No. 136

Population (2006)
  - Total: 0
- Time zone: CST
- Postal code: S9H 3X7
- Area code: 306
- Highways: Highway 363

Rosenhof is a hamlet in the Rural Municipality of Coulee No. 136, Saskatchewan, Canada. The hamlet is located on Range Road 3123 4 kilometres (2.5 mi) south of Highway 363, about 15 kilometres (9.3 mi) south of the city of Swift Current.

== Demographics ==
In 2010, Rosenhof had a population of 57 living in 20 dwellings. It was founded as a Mennonite settlement, but has seen an influx of other backgrounds in recent years.

== See also ==
- List of communities in Saskatchewan
- List of hamlets in Saskatchewan
