= Burnham, Saskatchewan =

Burnham
- Unincorporated community
- Location within Saskatchewan
- Coordinates: 50.156°N 107.281°W
- Country: Canada
- Province: Saskatchewan
- Region: Southwest Saskatchewan
- Census division: 7
- Rural Municipality: Coulee

Government
  - Reeve: Greg Targerson
  - Administrator: Ken Hollinger
  - Governing body: Coulee No. 136
- Time zone: CST
- Postal code: S9H 1K8
- Area code: 306
- Highways: Highway 363 / Highway 628

Burnham is an unincorporated community in the Rural Municipality of Coulee No. 136, Saskatchewan, Canada. The community is located on Highway 628, approximately 9 km (5.6 mi) north of Highway 363 and 15 km (9.3 mi) south of Swift Current.

The name probably comes from Burnham-on-Sea, Somerset, although it's possible it may derive from another Burnham in England.

== See also ==
- List of communities in Saskatchewan
