= Coderre, Saskatchewan =

Billage in Saskatchewan, Canada

Coderre
- Village
- Village of Coderre
- Location of Coderre in Saskatchewan Coderre (Canada)
- Coordinates: 50.135°N 106.384°W
- Country: Canada
- Province: Saskatchewan
- Region: Southwest
- Census division: 7
- Rural municipality: Rodgers No. 133

Government
  - Type: Municipal
  - Governing body: Coderre Village Council
  - Mayor: Keven Bender
  - Administrator: Patti Verville

Area
  - Total: 0.85 km^{2} (0.33 sq mi)

Population (2016)
  - Total: 30
  - Density: 35.1/km^{2} (91/sq mi)
- Time zone: UTC-6 (CST)
- Postal code: S0H 0X0
- Area code: 306
- Highways: Highway 627
- Railways: (Defunct pulled)

Coderre English: /koʊˈdɛər/) (2016 population: 30) is a village in the Canadian province of Saskatchewan within the Rural Municipality of Rodgers No. 133 and Census Division No. 7. The village is located approximately 85 kilometres (53 mi) southwest of the city of Moose Jaw on Highway 627.

== History ==
Coderre incorporated as a village on August 26, 1925.

== Climate ==
Climate data for Coderre
Month	Jan	Feb	Mar	Apr	May	Jun	Jul	Aug	Sep	Oct	Nov	Dec	Year
Record high °C (°F)	13 (55)	19 (66)	22 (72)	32.2 (90.0)	37 (99)	41.5 (106.7)	39 (102)	38.9 (102.0)	38 (100)	33 (91)	23.5 (74.3)	12.5 (54.5)	41.5 (106.7)
Mean daily maximum °C (°F)	−8.6 (16.5)	−4.6 (23.7)	2.1 (35.8)	11.7 (53.1)	18.7 (65.7)	23.3 (73.9)	26.1 (79.0)	25.7 (78.3)	19.2 (66.6)	12.1 (53.8)	0.8 (33.4)	−5.9 (21.4)	10 (50)
Daily mean °C (°F)	−14.5 (5.9)	−10.4 (13.3)	−4 (25)	4.7 (40.5)	11.3 (52.3)	16.1 (61.0)	18.5 (65.3)	17.7 (63.9)	11.5 (52.7)	4.8 (40.6)	−4.8 (23.4)	−11.8 (10.8)	3.3 (37.9)
Mean daily minimum °C (°F)	−20.3 (−4.5)	−16.3 (2.7)	−10 (14)	−2.3 (27.9)	3.9 (39.0)	8.8 (47.8)	10.9 (51.6)	9.8 (49.6)	3.7 (38.7)	−2.5 (27.5)	−10.4 (13.3)	−17.7 (0.1)	−3.5 (25.7)
Record low °C (°F)	−41.7 (−43.1)	−42 (−44)	−40.6 (−41.1)	−30 (−22)	−15 (5)	−5 (23)	1.1 (34.0)	−1.5 (29.3)	−13.3 (8.1)	−23 (−9)	−35.6 (−32.1)	−42 (−44)	−42 (−44)
Average precipitation mm (inches)	16 (0.6)	14 (0.6)	19.3 (0.76)	20.9 (0.82)	51.7 (2.04)	65.1 (2.56)	64.4 (2.54)	39.3 (1.55)	36.2 (1.43)	18.7 (0.74)	13.3 (0.52)	18.4 (0.72)	377.3 (14.85)
Source: Environment Canada

== Demographics ==
Population history (1981–2016)
Year	Pop.	±%
1981	114	—
1986	98	−14.0%
1991	68	−30.6%
1996	64	−5.9%
2001	50	−21.9%
2006	40	−20.0%
2011	30	−25.0%
2016	30	+0.0%
Source: Statistics Canada via Saskatchewan Bureau of Statistics

In the 2021 Census of Population conducted by Statistics Canada, Coderre had a population of 30 living in 18 of its 20 total private dwellings, a change of 0% from its 2016 population of 30. With a land area of 0.85 km^{2} (0.33 sq mi), it had a population density of 35.3/km^{2} (91.4/sq mi) in 2021.

In the 2016 Census of Population, the Village of Coderre recorded a population of 30 living in 16 of its 19 total private dwellings, a 0% change from its 2011 population of 30. With a land area of 0.85 km^{2} (0.33 sq mi), it had a population density of 35.3/km^{2} (91.4/sq mi) in 2016.

== See also ==
- List of communities in Saskatchewan
- List of villages in Saskatchewan
