= Hodgeville School =

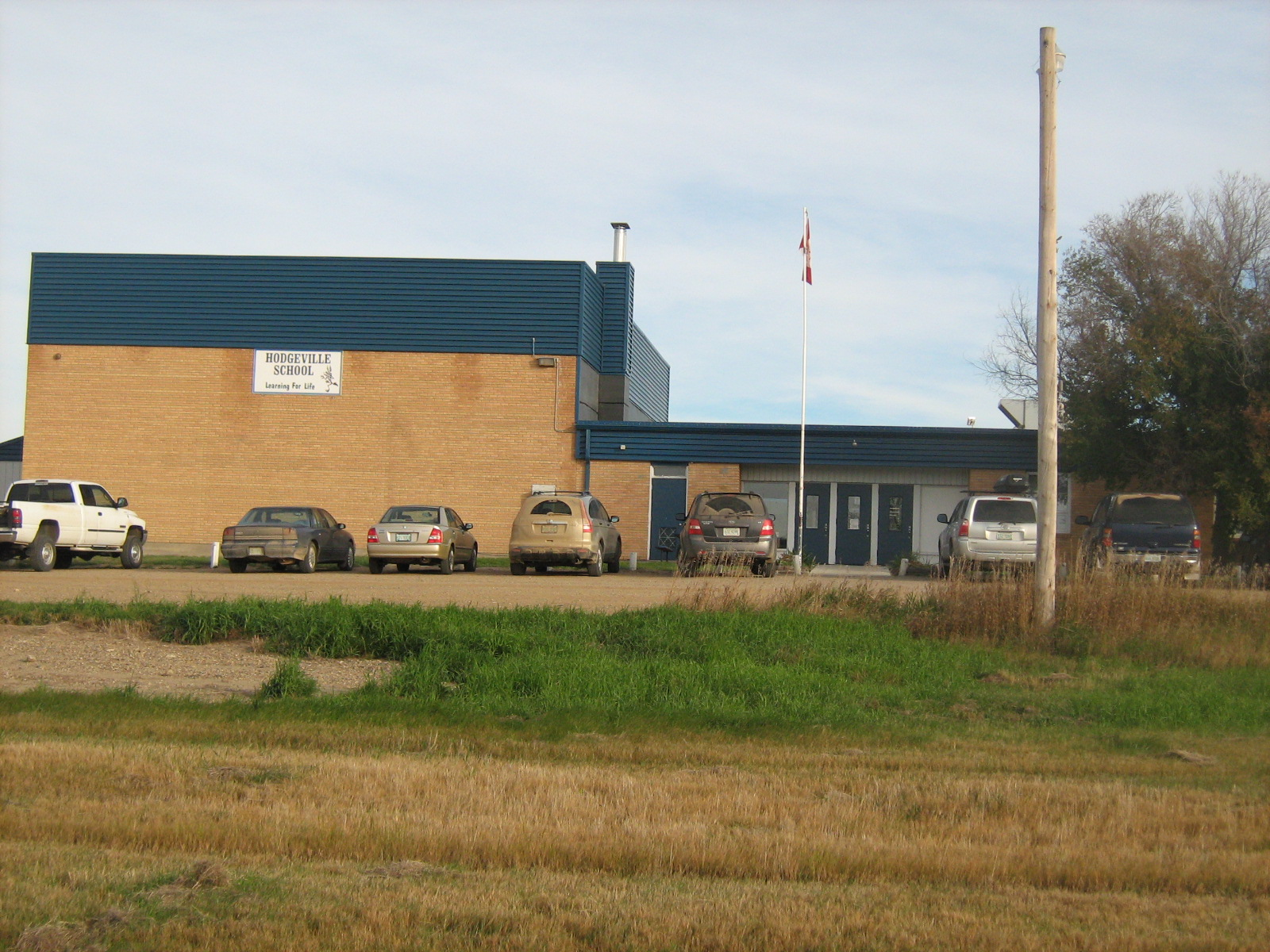

Location
- Hodgeville, Saskatchewan; Canada; 50.113836°N 106.958375°W

Information
- Motto: Learning for Life
- Founded: 1917
- Principal: Candice Fischer
- Mascot: Wile E. Coyote
- Website: schools.chinooksd.ca/hodgeville/

Hodgeville School is a public K-12 school in Hodgeville, Saskatchewan in Canada.

== History ==
When founded in 1917, Hodgeville school was a one-room school house one mile out of the village. Later, the school house was moved into town. The First year High School, which included Grade 8, was open was 1963 and the Hodgeville elementary school was opened in 1966.

In 1987, there was concern that the school would close due to the agricultural economic decline in the 1980s: "A few stores and garages are still open amid the boarded- up buildings on Main Street, but the only vibrant spot in Hodgeville is the school where the local farmers send their children. Once that goes, I can't see the town surviving." Hodgeville was home to two schools until 2002, when the Elementary School underwent renovations. In 2004 grades 7-12 moved over to the Elementary school, and it became "Hodgeville School".

== Sports Teams and Mascot ==
The sports at Hodgeville include volleyball, badminton, cross country running, golf, curling and track and field. The Coyote is the school mascot.

== Principals of Hodgeville School from 1959 to 2011 ==
| Time as Principal | Highschool Principal | Time as Principal | Elementary School Principal |
|---|---|---|---|
| 2023–present | Candice Fischer | 2023–present | Candice Fischer |
| 2022–2023 | Avril Jones | 2022–2023 | Avril Jones |
| 2021-2022 | Candice Fischer | 2021–2022 | Candice Fischer |
| 2010– 2021 | Ian Rewcastle | 2010-2021 | Ian Rewcastle |
| 2007-2010 | Brenda Park | 2007-2010 | Brenda Park |
| 2006-2007 | Jacob Cowan | 2006-2007 | Jacob Cowan |
| 1987-2006 | Leon Jacobs | 2004-2006 | Leon Jacobs |
| 1976-1987 | J. Tim Peake | 1999-2001 | Bill Brand |
| 1967-1975 | Ed Funk | 1995-1997 | Randy Porterfield |
| 1963-1966 | F.E. Wittle | 1992-1994 | Rod McKay |
| 1960-1963 | R. Lockert | 1991-1992 | Barry Putz |
| 1959-1960 | W. Williams | 1983-1991 | Garth McLeod |
| | | 1970-1983 | Robert Coward |
| | | 1966-1970 | Dennis Watson |
| | | 1963-1966 | A.D Hunter |
