= Braddock, Saskatchewan =

Community in Saskatchewan, Canada

Braddock
- Unincorporated community
- Location within Saskatchewan Location within Canada
- Coordinates: 50.621°N 107.233°W
- Country: Canada
- Province: Saskatchewan
- Region: Southwest Saskatchewan
- Census division: 7
- Rural Municipality: Coulee
- Established: 1946

Government
  - Reeve: Greg Targerson
  - Administrator: Ken Hollinger
  - Governing body: Coulee No. 136
- Time zone: CST
- Postal code: S9H 1K8
- Area code: 306
- Highways: Highway 721

Braddock is an unincorporated community in the Rural Municipality of Coulee No. 136, Saskatchewan, Canada. The community is at the western end of Braddock Reservoir on Highway 721. It is about 38 kilometres (24 mi) south-east of the city of Swift Current.

== See also ==
- List of communities in Saskatchewan
