= Rural Municipality of Lawtonia No. 135 =

Rural municipality in Saskatchewan, Canada

Lawtonia No. 135
- Rural municipality
- Rural Municipality of Lawtonia No. 135
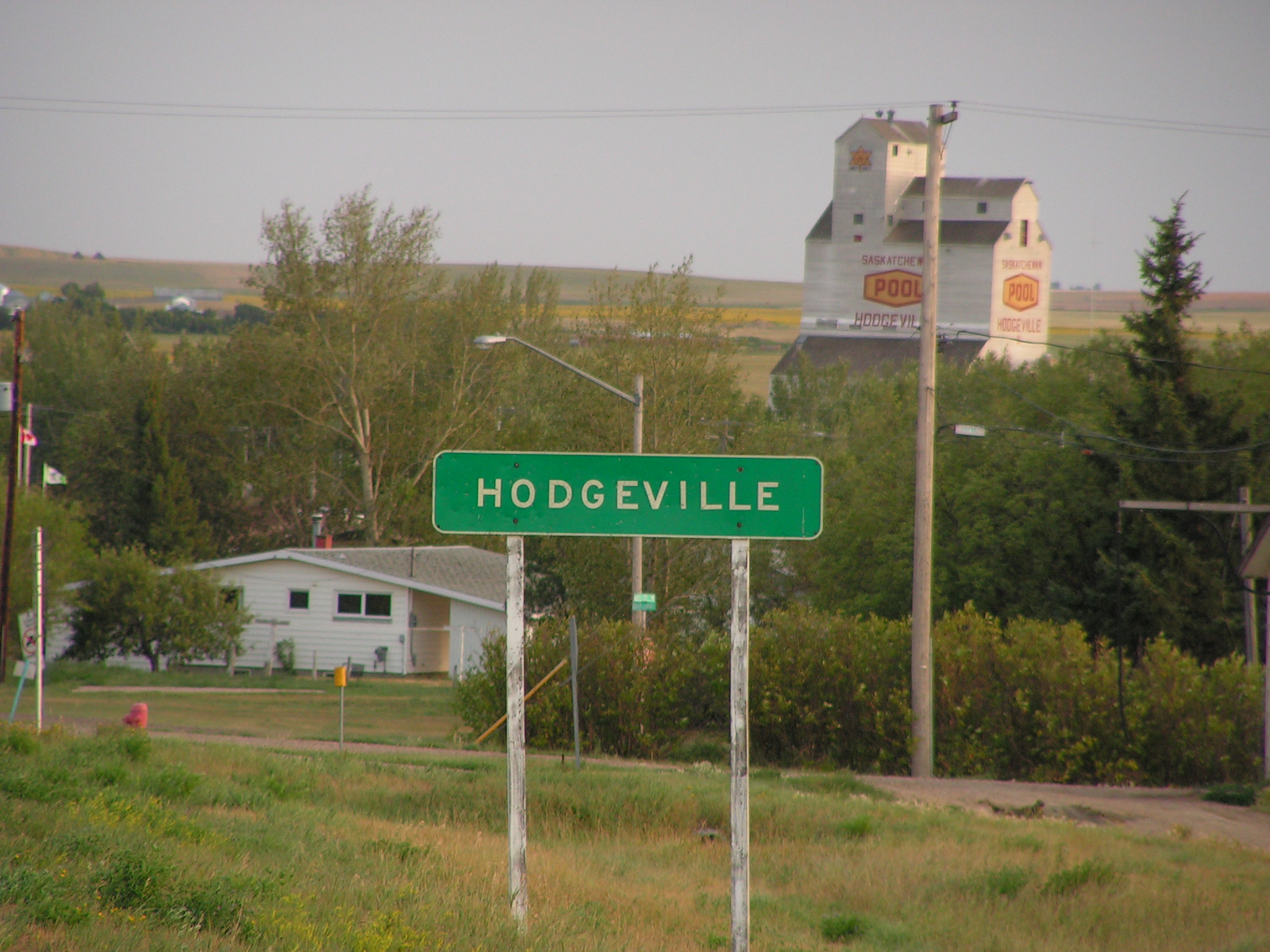
- Entry to Hodgeville

- Location of the RM of Lawtonia No. 135 in Saskatchewan
- Coordinates: 50.167°N 107.025°W
- Country: Canada
- Province: Saskatchewan
- Census division: 7
- SARM division: 3
- Formed: December 12, 1910

Government
  - Reeve: Andrew Hanson
  - Governing body: RM of Lawtonia No. 135 Council
  - Administrator: Raelee Boehm
  - Office location: Hodgeville

Area (2016)
  - Land: 845.28 km^{2} (326.36 sq mi)

Population (2016)
  - Total: 346
  - Density: 0.4/km^{2} (1.0/sq mi)
- Time zone: CST
  - Summer (DST): CST
- Area codes: 306 and 639

The Rural Municipality of Lawtonia No. 135 (2016 population: 346) is a rural municipality (RM) in the Canadian province of Saskatchewan within Census Division No. 7 and SARM Division No. 3.

== History ==
The RM of Lawtonia No. 135 incorporated as a rural municipality on December 12, 1910.

== Geography ==
=== Communities and localities ===
The following urban municipalities are surrounded by the RM.

Villages

- Hodgeville

The following unincorporated communities are within the RM.

Localities

- Flowing Well
- Tyson
- Vogel

== Demographics ==
Population history (1981–2016)
| Year | Pop. | ±% |
|---|---|---|
| 1981 | 587 | — |
| 1986 | 560 | −4.6% |
| 1991 | 550 | −1.8% |
| 1996 | 461 | −16.2% |
| 2001 | 432 | −6.3% |
| 2006 | 356 | −17.6% |
| 2011 | 434 | +21.9% |
| 2016 | 346 | −20.3% |
Source: Statistics Canada via Saskatchewan Bureau of Statistics

In the 2021 Census of Population conducted by Statistics Canada, the RM of Lawtonia No. 135 had a population of 356 living in 98 of its 120 total private dwellings, a change of 2.9% from its 2016 population of 346. With a land area of 843.24 km^{2} (325.58 sq mi), it had a population density of 0.4/km^{2} (1.1/sq mi) in 2021.

In the 2016 Census of Population, the RM of Lawtonia No. 135 recorded a population of 346 living in 108 of its 123 total private dwellings, a −20.3% change from its 2011 population of 434. With a land area of 845.28 km^{2} (326.36 sq mi), it had a population density of 0.4/km^{2} (1.1/sq mi) in 2016.

== Government ==
The RM of Lawtonia No. 135 is governed by an elected municipal council and an appointed administrator that meets on the second Wednesday of every month. The reeve of the RM is Andrew Hanson while its administrator is Raelee Boehm. The RM's office is located in Hodgeville.

== Transportation ==
- Highway 19—serves Hodgeville, Saskatchewan
- Highway 363—serves Hodgeville, Saskatchewan

== See also ==
- List of rural municipalities in Saskatchewan
