= Braddock Reservoir =

Reservoir in Saskatchewan, Canada

- Location in Saskatchewan Braddock Reservoir (Canada)
- Location: RM of Coulee No. 136, Saskatchewan
- Coordinates: 50.0834°N 107.3673°W
- Type: Reservoir
- Part of: Wood River drainage basin
- Primary inflows: Wiwa Creek
- River sources: Wood Mountain Hills
- Primary outflows: Wiwa Creek
- Basin countries: Canada
- Managing agency: Saskatchewan Water Security Agency
- Built: 1951
- Surface area: 48.5 ha (120 acres)
- Max. depth: 6.4 m (21 ft)
- Shore length^{1}: 6 km (3.7 mi)
- Settlements: Braddock
- ^{1} Shore length is not a well-defined measure.

Braddock Reservoir is a protected reservoir about 38 kilometres (24 mi) south-east of Swift Current in the Canadian province of Saskatchewan. The reservoir is along Wiwa Creek, which is a tributary of the Wood River, in the Old Wives Lake endorheic basin. The community of Braddock is near the lake's western end. Access is from Highway 721.

In 1951, Braddock Dam was built across Wiwa Creek creating Braddock Reservoir. The dam is owned by the Saskatchewan Water Security Agency.

== Fish species ==
Fish commonly found in Braddock Reservoir include northern pike and walleye. The lake is periodically stocked with walleye fry. It was most recently stocked in 2016 with 50,000 walleye fry.

== See also ==
- List of lakes of Saskatchewan
- List of dams and reservoirs in Canada
