= Hodgeville =

Village in Saskatchewan, Canada

- Village
- Village of Hodgeville
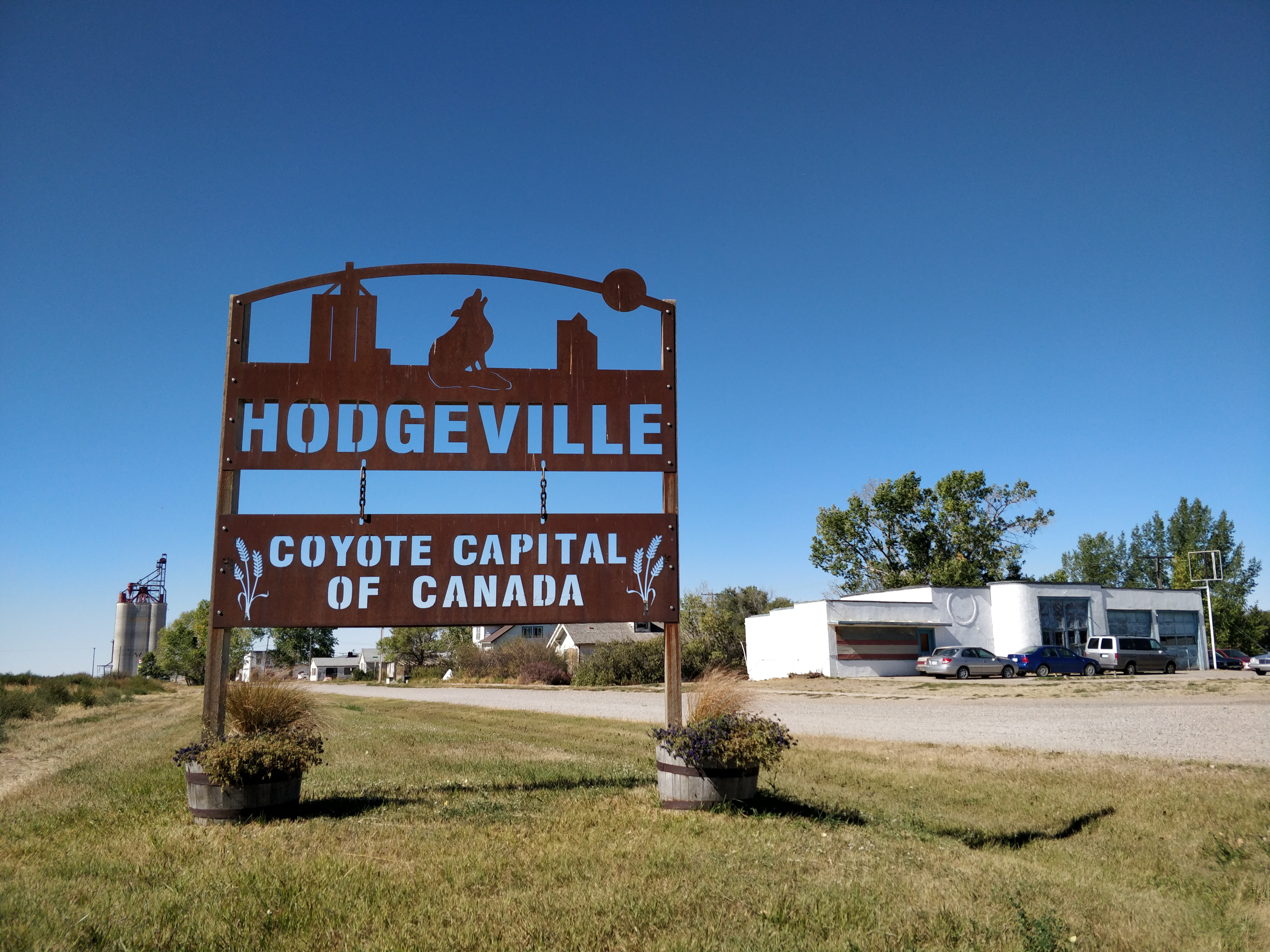
- Welcome sign
- Motto(s): Home of the Flag, Coyote Capital of Canada
- Location within Lawtonia No. 135 Location within Saskatchewan
- Coordinates: 50.1112°N 106.9637°W
- Country: Canada
- Province: Saskatchewan
- Rural municipality: Lawtonia No. 135
- Incorporated (Village): June, 1921

Government
  - Type: Municipal
  - Governing body: Hodgeville Village Council
  - Mayor: Kyle Hall
  - Administrator: Raegan Funk
  - MLA: Doug Steele
  - MP: Jeremy Patzer

Area
  - Total: 1.35 km^{2} (0.52 sq mi)

Population (2016)
  - Total: 172
  - Density: 127.6/km^{2} (330/sq mi)
- Time zone: UTC-6 (CST)
- Postal code: S0H 2B0
- Area code: 306
- Highways: Highway 19; Highway 363
- Railways: Canadian Pacific Railway

Hodgeville (2016 population: 172) is a village in the Canadian province of Saskatchewan within the Rural Municipality of Lawtonia No. 135 and Census Division No. 7. The village is located approximately 34 km south of the Trans-Canada Highway, 97 km southeast of the city of Swift Current.

== History ==
Hodgeville incorporated as a village on June 22, 1921.

== Demographics ==
Population history (1981–2016)
| Year | Pop. | ±% |
|---|---|---|
| 1981 | 329 | — |
| 1986 | 287 | −12.8% |
| 1991 | 258 | −10.1% |
| 1996 | 207 | −19.8% |
| 2001 | 175 | −15.5% |
| 2006 | 142 | −18.9% |
| 2011 | 172 | +21.1% |
| 2016 | 172 | +0.0% |
Source: Statistics Canada via Saskatchewan Bureau of Statistics

In the 2021 Census of Population conducted by Statistics Canada, Hodgeville had a population of 147 living in 66 of its 87 total private dwellings, a change of −14.5% from its 2016 population of 172. With a land area of 1.24 km^{2} (0.48 sq mi), it had a population density of 118.5/km^{2} (307.0/sq mi) in 2021.

In the 2016 Census of Population, the Village of Hodgeville recorded a population of 172 living in 75 of its 97 total private dwellings, a 0% change from its 2011 population of 172. With a land area of 1.35 km^{2} (0.52 sq mi), it had a population density of 127.4/km^{2} (330.0/sq mi) in 2016.

== Education ==
Hodgeville School is located in the community. Prior to 2002, there were an elementary school and a high school. The elementary school underwent renovations and the high school moved into the elementary school building.

== Notable people ==
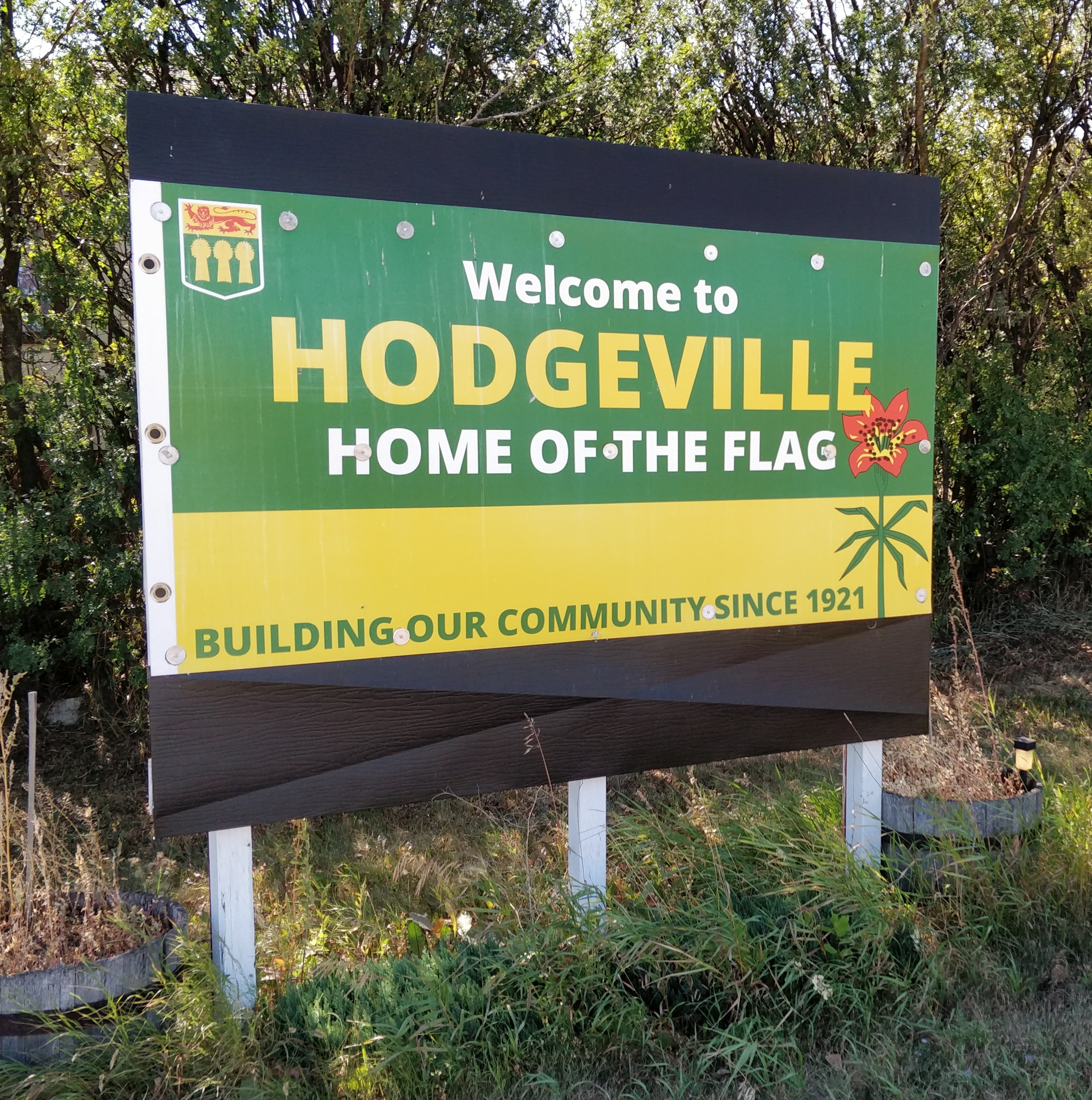
A sign proclaims that visitors are entering Hodgeville, "Home of the Flag"

The provincial Flag of Saskatchewan was originally created in 1969 by Anthony Drake, a school teacher from Hodgeville. The flag is displayed at the Heritage Museum.

== See also ==
- List of communities in Saskatchewan
- List of villages in Saskatchewan
