= Rural Municipality of Hillsborough No. 132 =

Rural municipality in Saskatchewan, Canada

Hillsborough No. 132
- Rural municipality
- Rural Municipality of Hillsborough No. 132
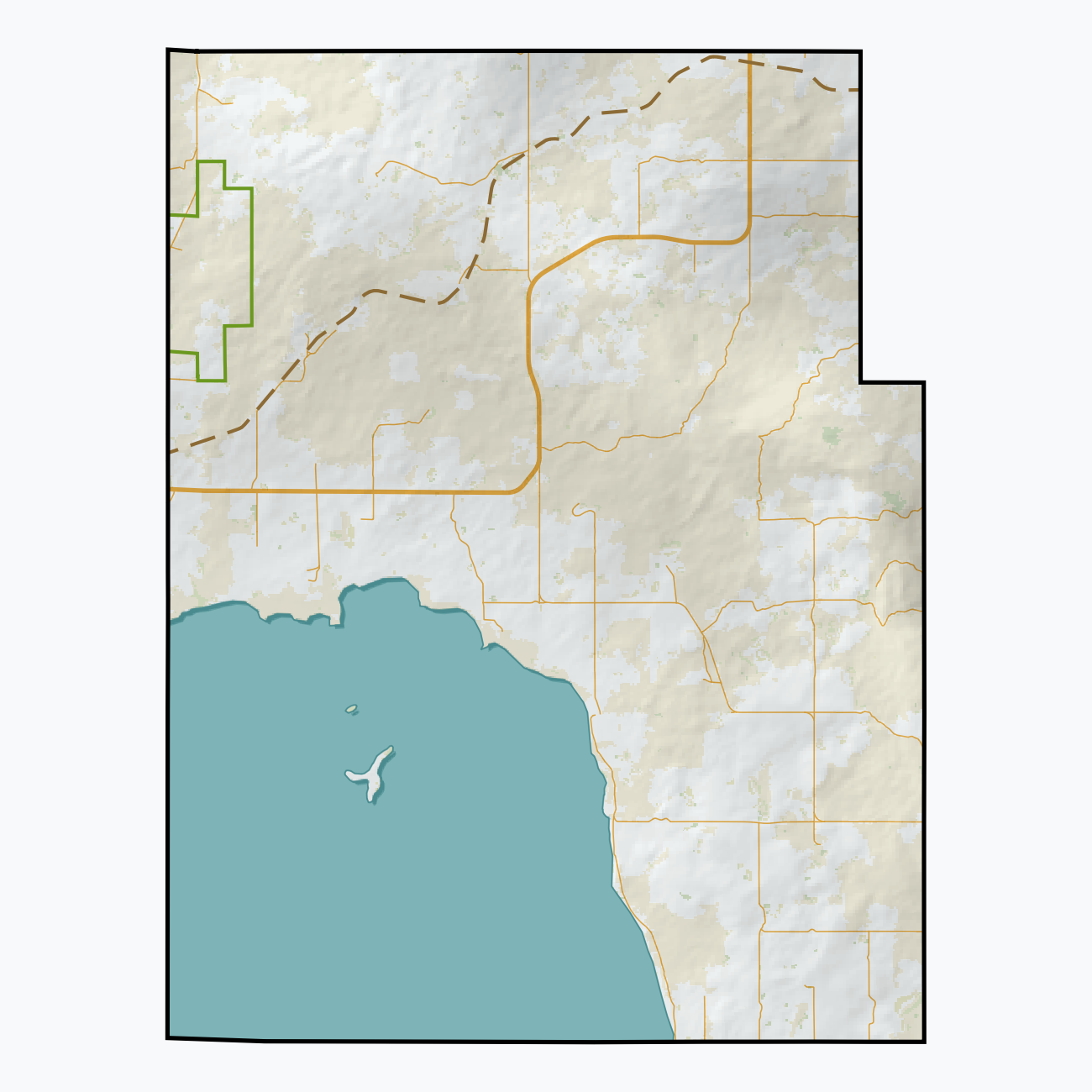

- Location of the RM of Hillsborough No. 132 in Saskatchewan
- Coordinates: 50.176°N 105.852°W
- Country: Canada
- Province: Saskatchewan
- Census division: 7
- SARM division: 2
- Formed: January 1, 1913

Government
  - Reeve: Don Tremblay
  - Governing body: RM of Hillsborough No. 132 Council
  - Administrator: Charlene Loos
  - Office location: Moose Jaw

Area (2016)
  - Land: 445.25 km^{2} (171.91 sq mi)

Population (2016)
  - Total: 101
  - Density: 0.2/km^{2} (0.52/sq mi)
- Time zone: CST
  - Summer (DST): CST
- Area codes: 306 and 639

The Rural Municipality of Hillsborough No. 132 (2016 population: 101) is a rural municipality (RM) in the Canadian province of Saskatchewan within Census Division No. 7 and SARM Division No. 2. At 445.25 kilometres (276.7 mi) in area, it is the smallest RM in Saskatchewan.

== History ==
The RM of Hillsborough No. 132 incorporated as a rural municipality on January 1, 1913. True to the name, much of its landmass is occupied by rolling pasture land, as well as Old Wives Lake. Because of this, it has often historically been Saskatchewan's least populated rural municipality. Its count of 101 current inhabitants exceeds only Glen McPherson No. 46, which has 72.

== Geography ==
=== Communities and localities ===
The following unincorporated communities are within the RM.

Localities

- Lillestrom
- Old Wives

== Demographics ==
Population history (1981–2016)
Year	Pop.	±%
1981	174	—
1986	182	+4.6%
1991	166	−8.8%
1996	154	−7.2%
2001	159	+3.2%
2006	122	−23.3%
2011	114	−6.6%
2016	101	−11.4%
Source: Statistics Canada via Saskatchewan Bureau of Statistics

In the 2021 Census of Population conducted by Statistics Canada, the RM of Hillsborough No. 132 had a population of 97 living in 41 of its 50 total private dwellings, a change of −4% from its 2016 population of 101. With a land area of 434.18 km^{2} (167.64 sq mi), it had a population density of 0.2/km^{2} (0.6/sq mi) in 2021.

In the 2016 Census of Population, the RM of Hillsborough No. 132 recorded a population of 101 living in 38 of its 54 total private dwellings, a −11.4% change from its 2011 population of 114. With a land area of 445.25 km^{2} (171.91 sq mi), it had a population density of 0.2/km^{2} (0.6/sq mi) in 2016.

== Government ==
The RM of Hillsborough No. 132 is governed by an elected municipal council and an appointed administrator that meets on the second Tuesday of every month. The reeve of the RM is Don Tremblay while its administrator is Charlene Loos. The RM's office is located in Moose Jaw.
