= Courval =

Community in Saskatchewan, Canada

- Unincorporated community
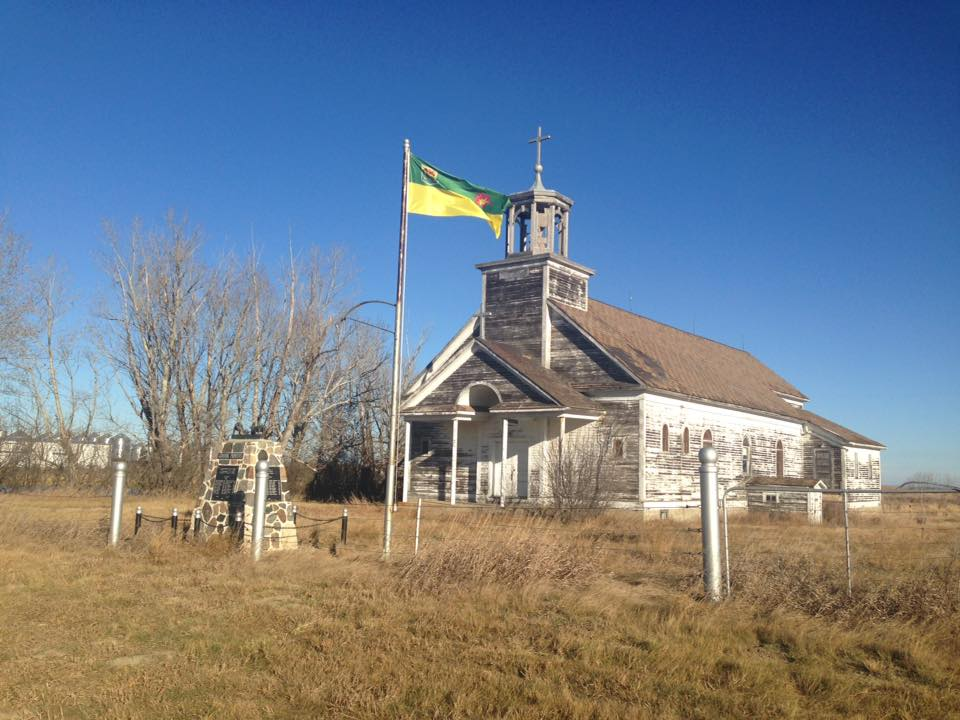
- Courval

- Location of Courval in Saskatchewan Courval (Canada)
- Coordinates: 50°09′30″N 106°15′18″W
- Country: Canada
- Province: Saskatchewan
- Rural municipality: Rodgers No. 133

Area
  - Land: 0.14 km^{2} (0.054 sq mi)

Population (2011)
  - Total: 5
  - Density: 35.1/km^{2} (91/sq mi)
- Time zone: UTC-6 (Central)
- Area code: 306

Courval is an unincorporated community in the Rural Municipality of Rodgers No. 133 in the Canadian province of Saskatchewan. Recognized as a designated place by Statistics Canada, Courval had a population of 5 in the Canada 2006 Census.

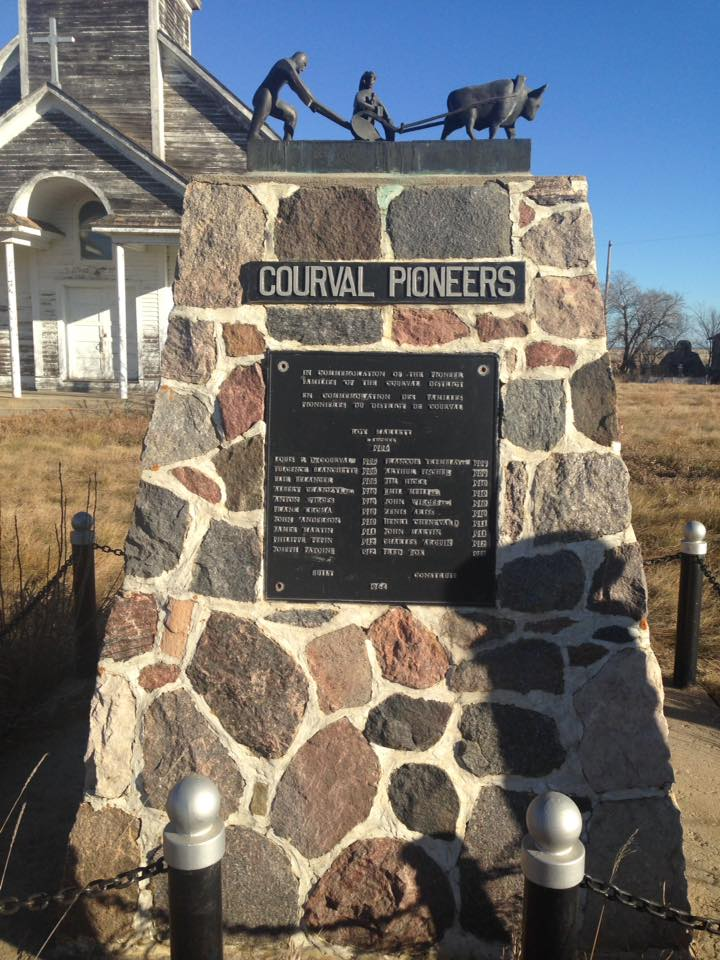
Commemorative marker for the pioneers of Courval in 1906

== Demographics ==
Canada census – Courval community profile

	2011
Population	5 (0.0% from 2006)
Land area	0.14 km^{2} (0.054 sq mi)
Population density	35.1/km^{2} (91/sq mi)
Median age
Private dwellings	2 (total)
Median household income

References: 2011

== Climate ==
Climate data for Courval
Month	Jan	Feb	Mar	Apr	May	Jun	Jul	Aug	Sep	Oct	Nov	Dec	Year
Record high °C (°F)	7 (45)	15 (59)	20.5 (68.9)	29 (84)	37 (99)	41 (106)	38.5 (101.3)	39.5 (103.1)	36 (97)	33 (91)	21 (70)	10.5 (50.9)	41 (106)
Mean daily maximum °C (°F)	−7.8 (18.0)	−5 (23)	2.6 (36.7)	12.3 (54.1)	19.1 (66.4)	23.4 (74.1)	26.1 (79.0)	26 (79)	19 (66)	11.6 (52.9)	0.8 (33.4)	−6.9 (19.6)	10.1 (50.2)
Daily mean °C (°F)	−12.9 (8.8)	−10.3 (13.5)	−2.5 (27.5)	5.3 (41.5)	11.9 (53.4)	16.4 (61.5)	18.7 (65.7)	18.3 (64.9)	11.8 (53.2)	5 (41)	−4.2 (24.4)	−12.1 (10.2)	3.8 (38.8)
Mean daily minimum °C (°F)	−18.1 (−0.6)	−15.5 (4.1)	−7.6 (18.3)	−1.7 (28.9)	4.7 (40.5)	9.3 (48.7)	11.2 (52.2)	10.6 (51.1)	4.6 (40.3)	−1.6 (29.1)	−9.1 (15.6)	−17.3 (0.9)	−2.5 (27.5)
Record low °C (°F)	−41 (−42)	−41 (−42)	−32.5 (−26.5)	−21 (−6)	−9 (16)	−3.5 (25.7)	2.5 (36.5)	−0.5 (31.1)	−8.5 (16.7)	−23.5 (−10.3)	−33 (−27)	−43 (−45)	−43 (−45)
Average precipitation mm (inches)	13 (0.5)	12.8 (0.50)	19.3 (0.76)	21.1 (0.83)	50.6 (1.99)	65.5 (2.58)	54.4 (2.14)	41.8 (1.65)	35 (1.4)	19.2 (0.76)	13 (0.5)	17.2 (0.68)	372.8 (14.68)
Source: Environment Canada

== See also ==
- List of communities in Saskatchewan
- List of ghost towns in Saskatchewan
