= List of Canadian federal electoral districts by region =

This is a list of Canada's 338 electoral districts as defined by the 2013 Representation Order which first came into effect for the 2015 Canadian Federal Election on October 19, 2015.

In most cases, provinces have been broken down into regions of a dozen or fewer districts; these are entirely unofficial and somewhat arbitrary.

See also List of Canadian federal electoral districts.

== Newfoundland and Labrador ==
- Avalon
- Terra Nova- the peninsulas
- Central Newfoundland (electoral district)
- Labrador
- Long Range Mountains
- St. John's East
- Cape Spear
- Total: 7

== Nova Scotia ==
- Cape Breton—Canso
- Central Nova
- Cumberland—Colchester
- Dartmouth—Cole Harbour
- Halifax
- Halifax West
- Kings—Hants
- Sackville—Preston—Chezzetcook
- South Shore—St. Margarets
- Sydney—Victoria
- West Nova
- Total: 11

== Prince Edward Island ==
- Cardigan
- Charlottetown
- Egmont
- Malpeque
- Total: 4

== New Brunswick ==
- Acadie—Bathurst
- Beauséjour
- Fredericton
- Fundy Royal
- Madawaska—Restigouche
- Miramichi—Grand Lake
- Moncton—Riverview—Dieppe
- New Brunswick Southwest
- Saint John—Rothesay
- Tobique—Mactaquac
- Total: 10

== Quebec ==
- Eastern Quebec (5)
  - Avignon—La Mitis—Matane—Matapédia
  - Bellechasse—Les Etchemins—Lévis
  - Gaspésie—Les Îles-de-la-Madeleine
  - Montmagny—L'Islet—Kamouraska—Rivière-du-Loup
  - Rimouski-Neigette—Témiscouata—Les Basques
- Côte-Nord and Saguenay (5)
  - Beauport—Côte-de-Beaupré—Île d'Orléans—Charlevoix
  - Chicoutimi—Le Fjord
  - Jonquière
  - Lac-Saint-Jean
  - Manicouagan
- Quebec City (5)
  - Beauport—Limoilou
  - Charlesbourg—Haute-Saint-Charles
  - Louis-Hébert
  - Louis-Saint-Laurent
  - Québec
- Central Quebec (9)
  - Bécancour—Nicolet—Saurel
  - Berthier—Maskinongé
  - Joliette
  - Lévis—Lotbinière
  - Montcalm
  - Portneuf—Jacques-Cartier
  - Repentigny
  - Saint-Maurice—Champlain
  - Trois-Rivières
- Eastern Townships (9)
  - Beauce
  - Brome—Missisquoi
  - Compton—Stanstead
  - Drummond
  - Mégantic—L'Érable
  - Richmond—Arthabaska
  - Saint-Hyacinthe—Bagot
  - Shefford
  - Sherbrooke
- Montérégie (10)
  - Beloeil—Chambly
  - Brossard—Saint-Lambert
  - Châteauguay—Lacolle
  - Longueuil—Charles-LeMoyne
  - Longueuil—Saint-Hubert
  - Montarville
  - Pierre-Boucher—Les Patriotes—Verchères
  - Saint-Jean
  - Salaberry—Suroît
  - Vaudreuil—Soulanges
- Central Montreal (10)
  - Hochelaga
  - LaSalle—Émard—Verdun
  - Laurier—Sainte-Marie
  - Mount Royal
  - Notre-Dame-de-Grâce—Westmount
  - Outremont
  - Papineau
  - Rosemont—La Petite-Patrie
  - Saint-Léonard—Saint-Michel
  - Ville-Marie—Le Sud-Ouest—Île-des-Sœurs
- Suburban Montreal and Laval (13)
  - Alfred-Pellan
  - Ahuntsic-Cartierville
  - Bourassa
  - Dorval—Lachine—LaSalle
  - Honoré-Mercier
  - Lac-Saint-Louis
  - La Pointe-de-l'Île
  - La Prairie
  - Laval—Les Îles
  - Marc-Aurèle-Fortin
  - Pierrefonds—Dollard
  - Saint-Laurent
  - Vimy
- Laurentides, Outaouais and Northern Quebec (12)
  - Abitibi—Baie-James—Nunavik—Eeyou
  - Abitibi—Témiscamingue
  - Argenteuil—La Petite-Nation
  - Gatineau
  - Hull—Aylmer
  - Laurentides—Labelle
  - Mirabel
  - Pontiac
  - Rivière-des-Mille-Îles
  - Rivière-du-Nord
  - Terrebonne
  - Thérèse-De Blainville
- Total: 78

== Ontario ==
- Northern Ontario (9)
  - Algoma—Manitoulin—Kapuskasing
  - Kenora
  - Nickel Belt
  - Nipissing—Timiskaming
  - Sault Ste. Marie
  - Sudbury
  - Thunder Bay—Rainy River
  - Thunder Bay—Superior North
  - Timmins-James Bay
- Ottawa (8)
  - Carleton
  - Kanata—Carleton
  - Nepean
  - Ottawa Centre
  - Orléans
  - Ottawa South
  - Ottawa—Vanier
  - Ottawa West—Nepean
- Eastern Ontario (8)
  - Bay of Quinte
  - Glengarry—Prescott—Russell
  - Kingston and the Islands
  - Lanark—Frontenac—Kingston
  - Leeds—Grenville—Thousand Islands and Rideau Lakes
  - Hastings—Lennox and Addington
  - Renfrew—Nipissing—Pembroke
  - Stormont—Dundas—South Glengarry
- Central Ontario (9)
  - Barrie—Innisfil
  - Barrie—Springwater—Oro-Medonte
  - Dufferin—Caledon
  - Haliburton—Kawartha Lakes—Brock
  - Northumberland—Peterborough South
  - Parry Sound-Muskoka
  - Peterborough—Kawartha
  - Simcoe—Grey
  - Simcoe North
- Durham and York Regions (15)
  - Ajax
  - Aurora—Oak Ridges—Richmond Hill
  - Durham
  - King—Vaughan
  - Markham—Stouffville
  - Markham—Thornhill
  - Markham—Unionville
  - Newmarket—Aurora
  - Oshawa
  - Pickering—Uxbridge
  - Richmond Hill
  - Thornhill
  - Vaughan—Woodbridge
  - Whitby
  - York—Simcoe
- Toronto (25)
  - Beaches—East York
  - Davenport
  - Don Valley East
  - Don Valley North
  - Don Valley West
  - Eglinton—Lawrence
  - Etobicoke Centre
  - Etobicoke—Lakeshore
  - Etobicoke North
  - Humber River—Black Creek
  - Parkdale—High Park
  - Scarborough—Agincourt
  - Scarborough Centre
  - Scarborough-Guildwood
  - Scarborough North (federal electoral district)
  - Scarborough—Rouge Park
  - Scarborough Southwest
  - Spadina—Fort York
  - Toronto Centre
  - Toronto—Danforth
  - Toronto—St. Paul's
  - University—Rosedale
  - Willowdale
  - York Centre
  - York South—Weston
- Brampton, Mississauga and Oakville (13)
  - Brampton Centre
  - Brampton East
  - Brampton North
  - Brampton South
  - Brampton West
  - Mississauga Centre
  - Mississauga East—Cooksville
  - Mississauga—Erin Mills
  - Mississauga—Lakeshore
  - Mississauga—Malton
  - Mississauga—Streetsville
  - Oakville
  - Oakville North—Burlington
- Hamilton, Burlington and Niagara (10)
  - Burlington
  - Flamborough—Glanbrook
  - Hamilton Centre
  - Hamilton East—Stoney Creek
  - Hamilton Mountain
  - Hamilton West—Ancaster—Dundas
  - Niagara Centre
  - Niagara Falls
  - Niagara West
  - St. Catharines
- Midwestern Southern Ontario (14)
  - Brantford—Brant
  - Bruce—Grey—Owen Sound
  - Cambridge
  - Guelph
  - Haldimand—Norfolk
  - Huron—Bruce
  - Kitchener Centre
  - Kitchener—Conestoga
  - Kitchener South—Hespeler
  - Milton
  - Oxford
  - Perth Wellington
  - Waterloo
  - Wellington—Halton Hills
- Southwestern Ontario (10)
  - Chatham-Kent—Leamington
  - Elgin—Middlesex—London
  - Essex
  - Lambton—Kent—Middlesex
  - London—Fanshawe
  - London North Centre
  - London West
  - Sarnia—Lambton
  - Windsor—Tecumseh
  - Windsor West
- Total: 121

== Manitoba ==
- Rural (6)
  - Brandon—Souris
  - Churchill—Keewatinook Aski
  - Dauphin—Swan River—Neepawa
  - Portage—Lisgar
  - Provencher
  - Selkirk—Interlake—Eastman
- Winnipeg (8)
  - Charleswood—St. James—Assiniboia—Headingley
  - Elmwood—Transcona
  - Kildonan—St. Paul
  - Saint Boniface—Saint Vital
  - Winnipeg Centre
  - Winnipeg North
  - Winnipeg South
  - Winnipeg South Centre
- Total: 14

== Saskatchewan ==
- Rural (8)
  - Battlefords—Lloydminster
  - Carlton Trail—Eagle Creek
  - Cypress Hills—Grasslands
  - Desnethé—Missinippi—Churchill River
  - Moose Jaw—Lake Centre—Lanigan
  - Prince Albert
  - Souris—Moose Mountain
  - Yorkton—Melville
- Regina (3)
  - Regina—Lewvan
  - Regina—Qu'Appelle
  - Regina—Wascana
- Saskatoon (3)
  - Saskatoon—Grasswood
  - Saskatoon—University
  - Saskatoon West
- Total: 14

== Alberta ==
- Rural (15)
  - Banff—Airdrie
  - Battle River—Crowfoot
  - Bow River
  - Foothills
  - Fort McMurray—Cold Lake
  - Grande Prairie-Mackenzie
  - Lakeland
  - Lethbridge
  - Medicine Hat—Cardston—Warner
  - Peace River—Westlock
  - Red Deer—Lacombe
  - Red Deer—Mountain View
  - Sherwood Park—Fort Saskatchewan
  - Sturgeon River—Parkland
  - Yellowhead
- Edmonton and environs (9)
  - Edmonton Centre
  - Edmonton Griesbach
  - Edmonton Manning
  - Edmonton Mill Woods
  - Edmonton Riverbend
  - Edmonton Strathcona
  - Edmonton West
  - Edmonton—Wetaskiwin
  - St. Albert—Edmonton
- Calgary (10)
  - Calgary Centre
  - Calgary Confederation
  - Calgary Forest Lawn
  - Calgary Heritage
  - Calgary Midnapore
  - Calgary Nose Hill
  - Calgary Rocky Ridge
  - Calgary Shepard
  - Calgary Signal Hill
  - Calgary Skyview
- Total: 34

== British Columbia ==
- Northern Interior B.C. (3)
  - Cariboo—Prince George
  - Prince George—Peace River—Northern Rockies
  - Skeena—Bulkley Valley
- Southern Interior B.C. (6)
  - Central Okanagan—Similkameen—Nicola
  - Kamloops—Thompson—Cariboo
  - Kelowna—Lake Country
  - Kootenay—Columbia
  - North Okanagan—Shuswap
  - South Okanagan—West Kootenay
- Fraser Valley and Southern Lower Mainland (11)
  - Abbotsford
  - Chilliwack—Hope
  - Cloverdale—Langley City
  - Delta
  - Fleetwood—Port Kells
  - Langley—Aldergrove
  - Mission—Matsqui—Fraser Canyon
  - Pitt Meadows—Maple Ridge
  - South Surrey—White Rock
  - Surrey Centre
  - Surrey—Newton
- Vancouver and Northern Lower Mainland (15)
  - Burnaby North—Seymour
  - Burnaby South
  - Coquitlam—Port Coquitlam
  - New Westminster—Burnaby
  - North Vancouver
  - Port Moody—Coquitlam
  - Richmond Centre
  - Steveston—Richmond East
  - Vancouver Centre
  - Vancouver East
  - Vancouver Granville
  - Vancouver Kingsway
  - Vancouver Quadra
  - Vancouver South
  - West Vancouver—Sunshine Coast—Sea to Sky Country
- Vancouver Island (7)
  - Courtenay—Alberni
  - Cowichan—Malahat—Langford
  - Esquimalt—Saanich—Sooke
  - Nanaimo—Ladysmith
  - North Island—Powell River
  - Saanich—Gulf Islands
  - Victoria
- Total: 42

== Yukon ==
- Yukon
  - Total: 1

== Northwest Territories ==
- Northwest Territories
  - Total: 1

== Nunavut ==
- Nunavut
  - Total: 1

Elections Canada: Electoral districts
