= Neidpath Castle =

Castle in Scottish Borders, Scotland

- Near Peebles, Scotland
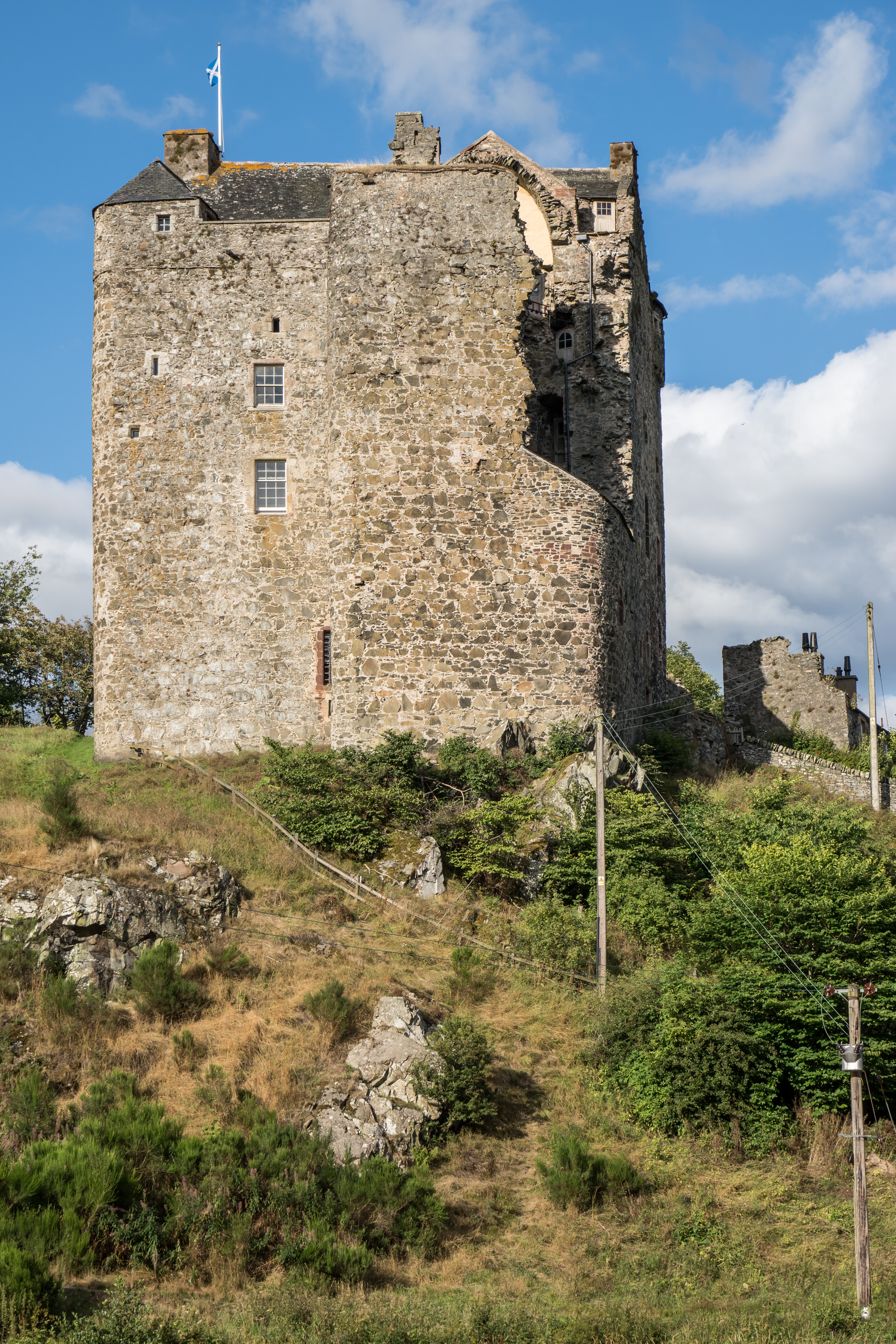
- Neidpath Castle

Site information
- Type: L-plan tower house
- Owner: Earl of Wemyss and March
- Open to the public: No
- Condition: Ruined

Location
- Location within Scottish Borders
- Coordinates: 55°39′5.5″N 3°12′53.2″W grid reference NT238404

Site history
- Built: c.1263–1266
- Built by: Simon Fraser
- Materials: Rubble and sandstone

Neidpath Castle is an L-plan rubble-built tower house, overlooking the River Tweed about 1 mile (1.6 km) west of Peebles in the Borders of Scotland. The castle is both a wedding venue and filming location and can be viewed by appointment.

== History ==
An early castle was probably built here by Simon Fraser of Oliver Castle between 1263 and 1266, while he held the office of High Sheriff of Tweeddale. The barony of Neidpath was acquired by the Hay family, through marriage in the early 14th century to the heiress Margaret, a daughter of the sheriff's son, Simon Fraser of Oliver and Neidpath. Sir William de Haya (d.c.1390) probably built the present castle in the late 14th century. It was held by them until the 17th century, although Sir William's son, Sir Thomas Hay, married the daughter and heiress of Sir Hugh Gifford of Yester, acquiring Yester Castle, which became the principal family seat, although Neidpath continued to be used. It was visited by Mary, Queen of Scots in 1563, and by her son James VI in 1587.

In 1645, Neidpath was garrisoned against the Royalist forces of James Graham, 1st Marquess of Montrose, although the following year, John Hay of Yester joined the King's party, and was created 1st Earl of Tweeddale by King Charles II. During Oliver Cromwell's invasion of Scotland in 1650, Neidpath was attacked. Mike Salter states that the castle was surrendered without a fight, although other sources suggest that it required the longest assault on any stronghold south of the River Forth to force it to surrender. James Taylor, writing in 1887, states that the 13th-century tower was demolished by artillery during the siege and the Listed building report notes that there was damage to the west wing. During the 1660s, the 2nd Earl of Tweeddale remodelled the castle, and constructed outbuildings. The 2nd Earl was an agricultural "improver", who planted an avenue of yews, of which one side remains. However, he was declared bankrupt, and sold Neidpath to William Douglas, 1st Duke of Queensberry in 1686.

In 1693, Queensberry gave the castle to his second son William Douglas, later the 1st Earl of March. His son William, the 2nd Earl, made alterations to the castle in the 18th century. The 3rd Earl inherited the title and estates of the Duke of Queensberry in 1778, and subsequently let Neidpath to tenants. These included the philosopher and historian Adam Ferguson. The castle suffered neglect, however, and by 1790 the upper storeys of the wing had collapsed. William Wordsworth and Walter Scott both visited the castle in 1803; Wordsworth was appalled at the felling of "a brotherhood of venerable Trees" writing a sonnet beginning "Degenerate Douglas! oh, the unworthy Lord." On the death of the Duke in 1810, the castle, along with the earldom of March, was inherited by the Earl of Wemyss, although the dukedom went to the Scotts of Buccleuch. Neidpath still belongs to Earl of Wemyss; the Earl's heir takes his courtesy title, Lord Neidpath, from it.

== Description ==
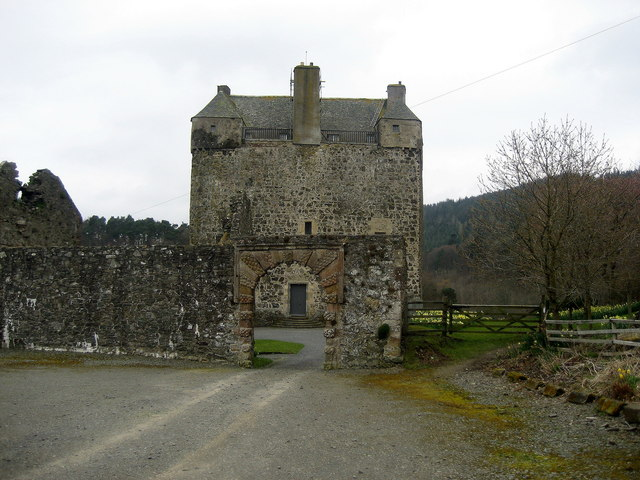
Entrance to Neidpath Castle

Neidpath Castle is a tall L-plan tower house, one leg of the L being very short. It has rounded corners. The battlements are roofed and the sentry walk is a balustraded balcony. There are few windows, and two still have their iron bar protection. Inside, the basement and the first-floor hall are vaulted, and the hall is further divided by a wooden floor into two storeys. Other features include a pit dungeon, and some small exhibitions of artifacts found in the locale. There are remains of a partly walled garden. The archway is decorated with both the goats head emblem of the Hays and the strawberries of the Frasers.

== Gardens ==
A series of five terraces, set at 8m centres, lies to the south-east and east of the castle. Originally serving as ornate garden terraces these were apparently enclosed by a wall which was recorded in 1581 and listed as a "sloping parterre" in 1815. Between 1682 and 1686 the terraces were remodelled and a summer house was built.

== Traditions ==
The castle is said to be haunted by the ghost of Jean Douglas, referred to by Walter Scott in his poem as "the Maid of Neidpath", the youngest daughter of William Douglas, Earl of March. Forbidden to marry the son of the laird of Tushielaw, who was considered below her station, she dwined while her lover was sent away. When he returned she was so wasted that he did not recognise her, causing her to die of a broken heart. She is reputed to appear clad in a full-length brown dress with a large white collar.

== Recent history ==
Neidpath has been used as a location for many films and television series, including Merlin: The Quest Begins starring Jason Connery and directed by David Winning, which was filmed in September and October 1997. It also was used for the series of Sam and Colby in 2019.

== See also ==
- Castles in Scotland
- Neidpath, Saskatchewan, a hamlet in western Canada named after Neidpath Castle
