= Rural Municipality of Shamrock No. 134 =

Rural municipality in Saskatchewan, Canada

Shamrock No. 134
- Rural municipality
- Rural Municipality of Shamrock No. 134

- Location of the RM of Shamrock No. 134 in Saskatchewan
- Coordinates: 50.168°N 106.615°W
- Country: Canada
- Province: Saskatchewan
- Census division: 7
- SARM division: 2
- Formed: December 9, 1912

Government
  - Reeve: Wayne Rud
  - Governing body: RM of Shamrock No. 134 Council
  - Administrator: Jody Kennedy
  - Office location: Shamrock

Area (2016)
  - Land: 757.52 km^{2} (292.48 sq mi)

Population (2016)
  - Total: 205
  - Density: 0.3/km^{2} (0.78/sq mi)
- Time zone: CST
  - Summer (DST): CST
- Area codes: 306 and 639

The Rural Municipality of Shamrock No. 134 (2016 population: 205) is a rural municipality (RM) in the Canadian province of Saskatchewan within Census Division No. 7 and SARM Division No. 2. Located in the south-central portion of the province, it is south of Highway 1 (the Trans-Canada Highway).

== History ==
The RM of Shamrock No. 134 incorporated as a rural municipality on December 9, 1912.

== Geography ==
=== Communities and localities ===
The following urban municipalities are surrounded by the RM.

Villages

- Shamrock

The following unincorporated communities are within the RM.

Localities

- Kelstern

== Demographics ==
Population history (1981–2016)
Year	Pop.	±%
1981	430	—
1986	412	−4.2%
1991	386	−6.3%
1996	312	−19.2%
2001	241	−22.8%
2006	226	−6.2%
2011	227	+0.4%
2016	205	−9.7%
Source: Statistics Canada via Saskatchewan Bureau of Statistics

In the 2021 Census of Population conducted by Statistics Canada, the RM of Shamrock No. 134 had a population of 194 living in 77 of its 88 total private dwellings, a change of −5.4% from its 2016 population of 205. With a land area of 761.86 km^{2} (294.16 sq mi), it had a population density of 0.3/km^{2} (0.7/sq mi) in 2021.

In the 2016 Census of Population, the RM of Shamrock No. 134 recorded a population of 205 living in 87 of its 99 total private dwellings, a −9.7% change from its 2011 population of 227. With a land area of 757.52 km^{2} (292.48 sq mi), it had a population density of 0.3/km^{2} (0.7/sq mi) in 2016.

== Government ==
The RM of Shamrock No. 134 is governed by an elected municipal council and an appointed administrator that meets on the second Thursday of every month. The reeve of the RM is Wayne Rud while its administrator is Jody Kennedy. The RM's office is located in Shamrock.

== See also ==
- List of rural municipalities in Saskatchewan
