= Shamrock, Saskatchewan =

Village in Saskatchewan, Canada

Coordinates: 50°09′36″N 106°37′33″W

Location of Shamrock in Saskatchewan

Shamrock (2016 population: 20) is a village in the Canadian province of Saskatchewan within the Rural Municipality of Shamrock No. 134 and Census Division No. 7.

== History ==
Shamrock originally incorporated as a village on April 30, 1924, but was later disorganized on December 31, 1953. The village later re-incorporated on January 1, 1960.

== Climate ==
Climate data for Shamrock
Month	Jan	Feb	Mar	Apr	May	Jun	Jul	Aug	Sep	Oct	Nov	Dec	Year
Record high °C (°F)	11.1 (52.0)	18.0 (64.4)	21.1 (70.0)	31.7 (89.1)	37.8 (100.0)	40.5 (104.9)	39.0 (102.2)	39.0 (102.2)	37.0 (98.6)	31.1 (88.0)	22.2 (72.0)	11.1 (52.0)	40.5 (104.9)
Mean daily maximum °C (°F)	−7.8 (18.0)	−4.6 (23.7)	1.9 (35.4)	11.4 (52.5)	18.3 (64.9)	23.2 (73.8)	25.8 (78.4)	25.5 (77.9)	18.3 (64.9)	11.7 (53.1)	0.6 (33.1)	−6.1 (21.0)	9.8 (49.6)
Daily mean °C (°F)	−12.7 (9.1)	−9.5 (14.9)	−3.4 (25.9)	4.9 (40.8)	11.6 (52.9)	16.4 (61.5)	18.7 (65.7)	18.1 (64.6)	11.6 (52.9)	5.3 (41.5)	−4.4 (24.1)	−11.1 (12.0)	3.8 (38.8)
Mean daily minimum °C (°F)	−17.5 (0.5)	−14.3 (6.3)	−8.7 (16.3)	−1.6 (29.1)	4.7 (40.5)	9.5 (49.1)	11.6 (52.9)	10.7 (51.3)	4.8 (40.6)	−1.0 (30.2)	−9.3 (15.3)	−16.1 (3.0)	−2.3 (27.9)
Record low °C (°F)	−40.6 (−41.1)	−38.9 (−38.0)	−36.7 (−34.1)	−26.7 (−16.1)	−9.4 (15.1)	−2.8 (27.0)	2.2 (36.0)	−1.0 (30.2)	−10 (14)	−22.5 (−8.5)	−33.0 (−27.4)	−40.5 (−40.9)	−40.6 (−41.1)
Average precipitation mm (inches)	14.9 (0.59)	15.3 (0.60)	21.2 (0.83)	22.1 (0.87)	50.8 (2.00)	64.0 (2.52)	54.3 (2.14)	35.7 (1.41)	33.4 (1.31)	13.4 (0.53)	11.4 (0.45)	17.2 (0.68)	353.6 (13.92)
Source: Environment Canada

== Demographics ==
Population history (1981–2016)
Year	Pop.	±%
1981	73	—
1986	74	+1.4%
1991	34	−54.1%
1996	30	−11.8%
2001	35	+16.7%
2006	20	−42.9%
2011	20	+0.0%
2016	20	+0.0%
Source: Statistics Canada via Saskatchewan Bureau of Statistics

In the 2021 Census of Population conducted by Statistics Canada, Shamrock had a population of 20 living in 12 of its 15 total private dwellings, a change of 0% from its 2016 population of 20. With a land area of 0.79 km^{2} (0.31 sq mi), it had a population density of 25.3/km^{2} (65.6/sq mi) in 2021.

In the 2016 Census of Population, the Village of Shamrock recorded a population of 20 living in 12 of its 18 total private dwellings, a 0% change from its 2011 population of 20. With a land area of 0.79 km^{2} (0.31 sq mi), it had a population density of 25.3/km^{2} (65.6/sq mi) in 2016.

== See also ==
- List of villages in Saskatchewan
