= Neidpath, Saskatchewan =

- Hamlet
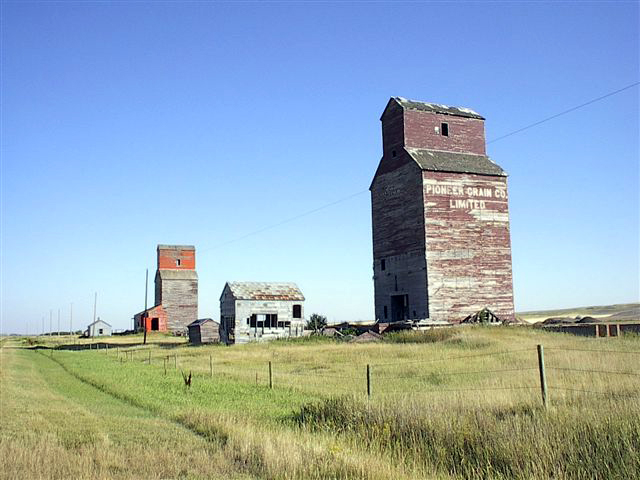
- Abandoned grain elevators in Neidpath

- Location within Saskatchewan
- Coordinates: 50.179°N 107.375°W
- Country: Canada
- Province: Saskatchewan
- Region: Southwest Saskatchewan
- Census division: 7
- Rural Municipality: Coulee
- Post office founded: August 1, 1909
- Incorporated (Village): 1920s

Government
  - Administrator: Ken Hollinger
  - Governing body: Coulee No. 136

Population (2001)
  - Total: 9
- Time zone: CST
- Postal code: S0N 1S0
- Area code: 306
- Highways: Highway 363 / Highway 720
- Waterways: Highfield Reservoir

Neidpath, is a hamlet in Coulee Rural Municipality No. 136, Saskatchewan, Canada. The hamlet is located on Highway 363 and Highway 720 about 25 km east of the city of Swift Current.

Neidpath was named after Neidpath Castle, near Peebles, Scotland. The name was suggested by the first postmaster, John Mitchell, whose family emigrated from Peebles. The town was located on a branch line of the Canadian Northern Railway (later Canadian National) that ran to Avonlea, Saskatchewan.

During its heyday Neidpath had four grain elevators, two of which still stand derelict today. At one time Neidpath even had its own telephone company, the Neidpath Rural Telephone Central Office. It also had hotels (including two Chinese hotels and restaurants and the King George Hotel along Central Avenue), a pool hall, hardware store, and a blacksmith shop. By 1981, CN had abandoned the rail line.

== See also ==
- List of ghost towns in Saskatchewan
- List of hamlets in Saskatchewan
- List of communities in Saskatchewan
- Lists of ghost towns in Canada
