= Rural Municipality of Rodgers No. 133 =

Rural municipality in Saskatchewan, Canada

Rodgers No. 133
- Rural municipality
- Rural Municipality of Rodgers No. 133

- Location of the RM of Rodgers No. 133 in Saskatchewan
- Coordinates: 50.183°N 106.238°W
- Country: Canada
- Province: Saskatchewan
- Census division: 7
- SARM division: 2
- Formed: December 9, 1912

Government
  - Reeve: Brent Tremblay
  - Governing body: RM of Rodgers No. 133 Council
  - Administrator: Charlene Loos
  - Office location: Moose Jaw

Area (2016)
  - Land: 719.8 km^{2} (277.9 sq mi)

Population (2016)
  - Total: 90
  - Density: 0.1/km^{2} (0.26/sq mi)
- Time zone: CST
  - Summer (DST): CST
- Area codes: 306 and 639

The Rural Municipality of Rodgers No. 133 (2016 population: 90) is a rural municipality (RM) in the Canadian province of Saskatchewan within Census Division No. 7 and SARM Division No. 2.

== History ==
The RM of Rodgers No. 133 incorporated as a rural municipality on December 9, 1912.

== Geography ==
The western portion of Old Wives Lake is in the southeast corner of the RM.

== Demographics ==
Population history (1981–2016)
Year	Pop.	±%
1981	349	—
1986	306	−12.3%
1991	226	−26.1%
1996	157	−30.5%
2001	159	+1.3%
2006	115	−27.7%
2011	101	−12.2%
2016	90	−10.9%
Source: Statistics Canada via Saskatchewan Bureau of Statistics

In the 2021 Census of Population conducted by Statistics Canada, the RM of Rodgers No. 133 had a population of 105 living in 42 of its 52 total private dwellings, a change of 16.7% from its 2016 population of 90. With a land area of 697.18 km^{2} (269.18 sq mi), it had a population density of 0.2/km^{2} (0.4/sq mi) in 2021.

In the 2016 Census of Population, the RM of Rodgers No. 133 recorded a population of 90 living in 39 of its 65 total private dwellings, a −10.9% change from its 2011 population of 101. With a land area of 719.8 km^{2} (277.9 sq mi), it had a population density of 0.1/km^{2} (0.3/sq mi) in 2016.

== Government ==
The RM of Rodgers No. 133 is governed by an elected municipal council and an appointed administrator that meets on the second Tuesday of every month. The reeve of the RM is Brent Tremblay while its administrator is Charlene Loos. The RM's office is located in Moose Jaw.
