= List of regions of Saskatchewan =

Flag of Saskatchewan

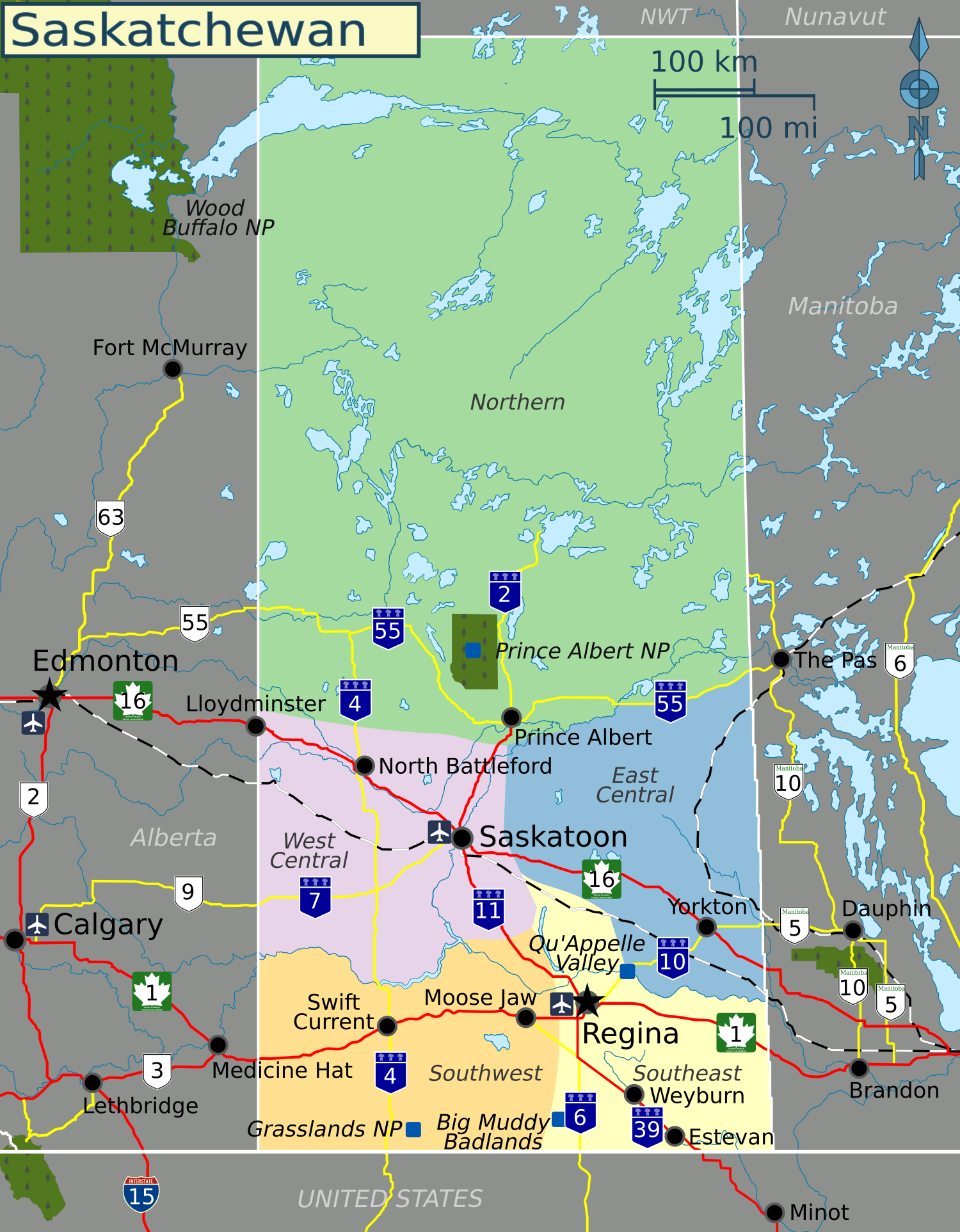
Map of regions of Saskatchewan, used on Wikivoyage.

The regional designations vary widely within the Canadian province of Saskatchewan. With a total land area of 651,036 square kilometres (251,366 sq mi), Saskatchewan is crossed by major rivers such as the Churchill and the Saskatchewan, and exists mostly within the Hudson Bay drainage area. Its borders were set at its entry into Confederation in 1905, and Saskatchewan is one of only two landlocked provinces (the other is Alberta) and the only province whose borders are not based on natural features.

As the fifth largest province by area (and sixth largest by population), Saskatchewan has been divided up into unofficial and official regions in many ways. In addition, it is part of larger national regions.

== Colloquial regions ==
=== Cardinal regions ===
The province is regularly divided into three regions of Northern, Central, and Southern Saskatchewan, the latter two of which include the subregions of East-Central, Southeast, Southwestern, and West-Central Saskatchewan. Along with these regions, the terms Northwestern and Northeastern Saskatchewan may be used to refer to the furthest north reaches of Central Saskatchewan; or, less often, they may be used to divide Northern Saskatchewan into two.

- Northern Saskatchewan, the northern half of the province, mostly uninhabited, with its southern boundary often defined near Prince Albert and the start of the boreal forest.
- Central Saskatchewan, the part of the province located between Northern and Southern Saskatchewan, including Saskatoon and the most densely populated parts of the province, with its northern boundary often defined at the boreal forest tree line and its southern boundary at Lake Diefenbaker and the Qu'Appelle Valley.
  - East-Central Saskatchewan, centred around Hudson Bay and Yorkton.
  - West-Central Saskatchewan, centred around Kindersley and the Battlefords.
- Southern Saskatchewan, the southernmost portion of the province, including Moose Jaw, Regina, and Swift Current, with its northern boundary often identified at Lake Diefenbaker and the Qu'Appelle Valley.
  - Southeast Saskatchewan, the southeastern corner of the province, centred around Estevan and Weyburn and often including the Regina and Qu'Appelle Valley areas.
  - Southwest Saskatchewan, the southwestern corner of the province, including the Big Muddy Badlands, Cypress Hills, Grasslands National Park, Swift Current, and sometimes the Lake Diefenbaker and Moose Jaw areas.

=== Other regions ===
Parts of Saskatchewan have been given formal and informal names, including:

- Garlic Belt (or Perogy Belt), across Central Saskatchewan, especially around the Canora and Yorkton areas, and part of the larger region that spreads from Central Alberta to Southern Manitoba, nicknamed for its abundance of people of Ukrainian descent.
- Ghost Town Trail, region of largely abandoned communities spanning across the southern part of the province and centred around Highway 13.
- Medicine Line, along the border between Canada and the United States (from the Lake of the Woods to the continental divide), named so by Native Americans because of its ability to prevent U.S. soldiers from crossing it.
- White Butte, consisting of the bedroom communities directly east of Regina—White City, Pilot Butte, and Balgonie—and their surrounding area

== Provincial designations ==
=== Crop report regions ===
The provincial government has divided the province into six regions for reporting crops statistics.

- Southeast, consisting of census divisions 1, 2, 5, and 6, whose largest population centre is Regina
- Southwest, consisting of census divisions 3, 4, 7, and 8, whose largest population centre is Moose Jaw
- East-Central, consisting of census divisions 9, 10, and 11, whose largest population centre is Saskatoon
- West-Central, consisting of census divisions 12 and 13, whose largest population centre is Kindersley
- Northeast, consisting of census divisions 14 and 15, whose largest population centre is Prince Albert
- Northwest, consisting of census divisions 16 and 17, whose largest population centres are North Battleford and Lloydminster

=== Former health regions ===
Until 2017, the province was divided into 13 health regions. As of December 4, 2017, it is considered defunct, as all health regions in Saskatchewan have been replaced by the Saskatchewan Health Authority.

- Athabasca Health Authority, in the far north of the province, including Stony Rapids.
- Cypress Regional Health Authority, centred around Swift Current and including the southwestern corner of the province.
- Five Hills Regional Health Authority, centred around Moose Jaw and including the Big Muddy Badlands to the U.S. border.
- Heartland Regional Health Authority, in the west-central part of the province.
- Keewatin Yatthé Regional Health Authority, in the western half of Northern Saskatchewan, including Buffalo Narrows and La Loche.
- Kelsey Trail Regional Health Authority, including Hudson Bay, Melfort, and Nipawin.
- Mamawetan Churchill River Regional Health Authority, in the eastern half of Northern Saskatchewan, including La Ronge and Southend.
- Prairie North Regional Health Authority, centred around the Battlefords and areas to the northwest.
- Prince Albert Parkland Regional Health Authority, centred around Prince Albert and including surrounding areas.
- Regina Qu'Appelle Regional Health Authority, centred around Regina and including communities on the Qu'Appelle River and Highway 1 to the East.
- Saskatoon Regional Health Authority, centred around Saskatoon and including communities Highway 16 to the East.
- Sunrise Regional Health Authority, centred around Yorkton and including surrounding areas.
- Sun Country Regional Health Authority, centred around Estevan and including the southeastern corner of the province.

=== Library districts ===
Saskatchewan's public library system includes three municipal library systems, seven regional library systems, one northern library federation, and a provincial library.

- Chinook Regional Library, serving the southwest part of the province, including Swift Current.
- City of Prince Albert Public Library Board, serving the city of Prince Albert.
- Lakeland Regional Library, serving the Battlefords and surrounding areas.
- Pahkisimon Nuye?áh System, serving Northern Saskatchewan.
- Palliser Regional Library, serving Moose Jaw and surrounding areas.
- Parkland Regional Library, serving the east-central part of the province, including Yorkton.
- Regina Public Library, serving the city of Regina.
- Saskatoon Public Library, serving the city of Saskatoon.
- Southeast Regional Library, serving the southeast part of the province, including Estevan and Weyburn.
- Wapiti Regional Library, serving Melfort, Nipawin, and surrounding areas.
- Wheatland Regional Library, serving the west-central part of the province, including Kindersley and areas around Saskatoon.

=== Phone book distribution regions ===
DirectWest, a division of SaskTel, distributes ten telephone directories throughout the province in ten different regions—one each for Regina and Saskatoon, and eight more based generally on proximity to major centres.

- Estevan/Weyburn and District, serving the southeast part of the province.
- Melville/Yorkton and District, serving the east-central part of the province.
- Moose Jaw and District, serving the south-central part of the province.
- North Battleford and District, serving the west-central and northwest parts of the province.
- Prince Albert and District, serving the north-central and northeast parts of the province.
- Regina City, covering Regina and surrounding area.
- Regina District, covering areas including Highway 1 East, Highway 48, Last Mountain Lake, and the Qu'Appelle Valley.
- Saskatoon City, covering Saskatoon and surrounding area.
- Saskatoon District, covering areas including Highway 5, Highway 16, and the South Saskatchewan River Valley.
- Swift Current and District, covering the southwest part of the province.

=== Rural municipality divisions ===
The Saskatchewan Association of Rural Municipalities has divided the provinces rural municipalities into six regions, each of which is represented by a member on its board of directors. Note that the northern half of the province is not part of any rural municipalities; instead, much of it is unorganized, thus being part of the Northern Saskatchewan Administration District.

- North Central (SARM Division No. 5)
- North East (SARM Division No. 4)
- North West (SARM Division No. 6)
- South Central (SARM Division No. 2)
- South East (SARM Division No. 1)
- South West (SARM Division No. 3)

=== Sport, Culture, and Recreation districts ===
The province is divided into nine districts for sport, culture, and recreation purposes, each of which are headed by a volunteer, non-profit organization. Two of the districts (Regina and Saskatoon) represent the provinces main urban centres, while the other seven districts represent a mix of urban and rural areas. These districts are used, for example, as the teams for the Saskatchewan Games.

- Lakeland, including the cities of Melfort, Prince Albert and surrounding areas.
- North, including the city of Flin Flon and most of the northern half of the province.
- Parkland Valley, including the cities of Melville, Yorkton and surrounding areas.
- Prairie Central, including the cities of Humboldt, Martensville, Warman and surrounding areas.
- Regina, for the city of Regina.
- Rivers West, including the cities of Lloydminster, Meadow Lake, North Battleford and surrounding areas.
- Saskatoon, for the city of Saskatoon.
- South East, including the cities of Estevan, Weyburn and surrounding areas.
- South West, including the cities of Moose Jaw, Swift Current and surrounding areas.

=== Tourism regions ===
Tourism Saskatchewan designates five regions in the province for travel promotion.

- Central Saskatchewan, the part of the province between Northern Saskatchewan and Southern Saskatchewan, including the Battlefords, Hudson Bay, Manitou Beach, the Saskatchewan River, and Yorkton.
- Northern Saskatchewan, the northern half of the province, including the Churchill River, Lac La Ronge, Lake Athabasca, Prince Albert, and Prince Albert National Park.
- Regina, for the city of Regina and its immediate surroundings.
- Saskatoon, for the city of Saskatoon and its immediate surroundings.
- Southern Saskatchewan, the southernmost portion of the province, including the Big Muddy Badlands, Cypress Hills, Grasslands National Park, Lake Diefenbaker, Last Mountain Lake, Moose Jaw, Moose Mountain, the Qu'Appelle Valley, and Swift Current.

=== Wildlife federation regions ===
The Saskatchewan Wildlife Federation divides its branches and work across the province into six regions.

- East-Central (Region 3), including Hudson Bay and Yorkton.
- Northeast (Region 1), including Prince Albert and the eastern two-thirds of Northern Saskatchewan.
- Northwest (Region 2), including the Battlefords, Meadow Lake, and the western third of Northern Saskatchewan.
- Southeast (Region 4), including Regina and Estevan.
- Southwest (Region 6), including Moose Jaw and Swift Current.
- West-Central (Region 5), including Kindersley and Saskatoon.

== Federal designations ==
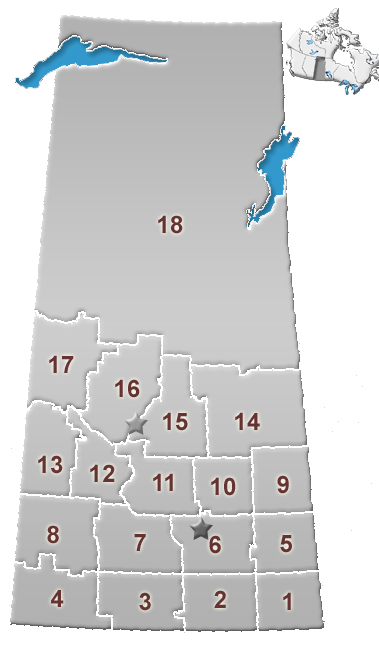
Census divisions of Saskatchewan

=== Census divisions ===
Statistics Canada has divided Saskatchewan into 18 census divisions for statistical purposes; although, they do not reflect the organization of local government nor any common regions in the province.

- Division No. 1, whose largest population centre is Estevan
- Division No. 2, whose largest population centre is Weyburn
- Division No. 3, whose largest population centre is Assiniboia
- Division No. 4, whose largest population centre is Maple Creek
- Division No. 5, whose largest population centre is Melville
- Division No. 6, whose largest population centre is Regina
- Division No. 7, whose largest population centre is Moose Jaw
- Division No. 8, whose largest population centre is Swift Current
- Division No. 9, whose largest population centre is Yorkton
- Division No. 10, whose largest population centre is Wynyard
- Division No. 11, whose largest population centre is Saskatoon
- Division No. 12, whose largest population centre is Battleford
- Division No. 13, whose largest population centre is Kindersley
- Division No. 14, whose largest population centre is Melfort
- Division No. 15, whose largest population centre is Prince Albert
- Division No. 16, whose largest population centre is North Battleford
- Division No. 17, whose largest population centre is Lloydminster
- Division No. 18, whose largest population centre is La Ronge

=== Economic regions ===
Statistics Canada has divided Saskatchewan into 6 economic regions, meant to reflect the province's hubs of economic activity and their surrounding areas.

- Northern, consisting of census division No. 18
- Prince Albert, consisting of census divisions No. 14, No. 15, No. 16, and No. 17
- Regina—Moose Mountain, consisting of census divisions No. 1, No. 2, and No. 6
- Saskatoon—Biggar, consisting of census divisions No. 11, No. 12, and No. 13
- Swift Current—Moose Jaw, consisting of census divisions No. 3, No. 4, No. 7, and No. 8
- Yorkton—Melville, consisting of census divisions No. 5, No. 9, and No. 10

=== Federal electoral districts ===
Saskatchewan is divided into 14 federal electoral districts and thus is represented by 14 of the 338 members of Canada's House of Commons. Since the 2012 Canadian federal electoral redistribution, Saskatchewan had five urban districts, one hybrid district, and eight mostly-rural districts.

- Battlefords—Lloydminster—Meadow Lake
- Carlton Trail—Eagle Creek
- Desnethé—Missinippi—Churchill River
- Moose Jaw—Lake Centre—Lanigan
- Prince Albert
- Regina—Lewvan
- Regina—Qu'Appelle
- Regina—Wascana
- Saskatoon—University
- Saskatoon South
- Saskatoon West
- Souris—Moose Mountain
- Swift Current—Grasslands—Kindersley
- Yorkton—Melville

=== Numbered treaties ===
The entirety of Saskatchewan is covered by the territory of Numbered Treaties.

- Treaty 2 (1871) territory, including a small part of Southeast Saskatchewan.
- Treaty 4 (1874) territory, including Regina and much of Southern Saskatchewan, signed at Fort Qu'Appelle.
- Treaty 5 (1875) territory, including a small part of the province north of Hudson Bay.
- Treaty 6 (1876) territory, including Saskatoon and much of Central Saskatchewan, signed at Fort Carlton and Fort Pitt.
- Treaty 8 (1899) territory, including parts of Northern Saskatchewan.
- Treaty 10 (1906) territory, including much of Northern Saskatchewan, signed at Île-à-la-Crosse.

== Ecclesiastical designations ==
Saskatchewan is divided into several religious jurisdictions, or dioceses, which serve as administrative regions for various Christian denominations. These boundaries often reflect historical settlement patterns rather than modern municipal or census divisions.

=== Anglican Church of Canada ===
The province falls within the Ecclesiastical Province of the Northern Lights (formerly known as the Ecclesiastical Province of Rupert's Land). It is divided into three distinct dioceses:

- Diocese of Saskatchewan: Covers the northern half of the province. The see city is Prince Albert. This diocese is unique for its high number of Indigenous parishes and the use of the Cree language in liturgy.
- Diocese of Saskatoon: Covers the central portion of the province, including the city of Saskatoon and surrounding rural areas.
- Diocese of Qu'Appelle: Encompasses the southern third of the province. The see city is Regina.

=== Roman Catholic Church ===
The Roman Catholic Church organizes the province into one ecclesiastical province consisting of one archdiocese and two suffragan dioceses, plus a province-wide eparchy for Ukrainian Catholics:

- Archdiocese of Regina: Serves the southern part of the province.
- Diocese of Saskatoon: Serves the central-west region of the province.
- Diocese of Prince Albert: Serves the central-east and northern regions of the province.
- Eparchy of Saskatoon: Holds jurisdiction over all Ukrainian Catholics within the entire province of Saskatchewan. Its see is the Cathedral of St. George in Saskatoon.

== Climate and geographical designations ==
=== Drainage basins ===
Most water in Saskatchewan drains to Hudson Bay through the Churchill and Nelson river basins, although some drains to the Arctic Ocean in the far north and the Gulf of Mexico in the far southwest.

- Arctic Ocean drainage basin, with the Mackenzie River basin (includes Stony Rapids on the Fond du Lac).
- Gulf of Mexico drainage basin, with the Missouri River basin (includes Eastend and Grasslands National Park on the Frenchman).
- Hudson Bay drainage basin, with the Churchill River basin (includes Buffalo Narrows and La Ronge), the Red River basin (includes Estevan on the Souris and Regina near the Qu'Appelle), and the Saskatchewan River basin (includes Prince Albert on the North Saskatchewan and Saskatoon on the South Saskatchewan).

=== Ecozones and ecoprovinces ===
Saskatchewan is home to four of Canada's 15 ecozones, as defined by the 2017 Ecological Land Classification. These ecozones are further divided into numerous ecoprovinces, ecoregions, and ecodistricts.

- Boreal Plains Ecozone, in Central and Northern Saskatchewan, including Prince Albert and Prince Albert National Park.
  - Boreal Transition, including Nipawin and Prince Albert.
  - Mid-Boreal Lowland, including Cumberland House.
  - Mid-Boreal Upland, including La Ronge and Prince Albert National Park.
- Boreal Shield Ecozone, in Northern Saskatchewan, mostly between the Churchill River and Lake Athabasca.
  - Athabasca Plain, the western part of the ecozone in Saskatchewan.
  - Churchill River Upland, the eastern part of the ecozone in Saskatchewan.
- Prairies Ecozone, including Grasslands National Park, Moose Jaw, Regina, and Saskatoon.
  - Aspen Parkland, including the Battlefords and Yorkton.
  - Cypress Upland, in the Cypress Hills.
  - Mixed Grassland, including Grasslands National Park and Swift Current.
  - Moist Mixed Grassland, including Moose Jaw, Regina, and Saskatoon.
- Taiga Shield Ecozone, in Northern Saskatchewan, north of Lake Athabasca.
  - Selwyn Lake Upland, in the far northeastern corner of the province.
  - Tazin Lake Upland, including Stony Rapids and Uranium City.

=== Koppen climate regions ===
Being in the centre of North America, Saskatchewan is far removed from the moderating effects of any large body of water and therefore has a temperate continental climate, Köppen climate classification types BSk, Dfb and Dfc.

== Other designations ==
=== Assemblée communautaire fransaskoise electoral districts ===
The Assemblée communautaire fransaskoise (ACF) is the representative body of the Fransaskois (French Canadians and francophones living in Saskatchewan). The ACF divides its membership into twelve electoral districts.

- Ponteix, including the French and francophone communities of Lac Pelletier, Vallée Ste. Claire, the Cypress Hills, Ponteix, Cadillac, Dollard, Frenchville, and Val Marie
- Gravelbourg–Willow Bunch, including the French and francophone communities of Coulée du Rocher, Coulée Chapelle, Willow Bunch, Wood Mountain, Radville, the Souris Valley, Gravelbourg, Meyronne, Coderre, Courval, and Ferland
- Bellegarde, including the French and francophone communities of St. Hubert Mission, Bellegarde, Cantal, and Forget
- La Trinité, including the French and francophone communities of Prud'homme, Vonda, and St. Denis
- Regina, including the French and francophone communities of Lebret, the Qu'Appelle Valley, the Touchwood Hills, Rocanville, Marieval, Montmartre, Sedley, and Bechard
- Saskatoon, including the French and francophone community of Round Prairie
- Battleford, including the French and francophone communities of Frenchman Butte, Cochin, Prince, Vawn, Edam, Jackfish Lake, Delmas, Butte-St-Pierre, and Makwa
- Prince Albert, including the French and francophone communities of Albertville
- Bellevue, including the French and francophone communities of Fort Carlton, Duck Lake, Petite Ville, Fish Creek, Batoche, St. Laurent de Grandin St. Isidore-de-Bellevue, St. Louis, Domremy, Marcelin, Coteau, Bonne Madone, and St. Brieux
- Debden, including the French and francophone communities of Laventure, Spiritwood, Debden, Bapaume, and Leoville
- Zenon Park, including the French and francophone communities of Perigord, Pré-Ste-Marie, Zenon Park, Saint-Front, and Veillardville
- Moose Jaw

=== Métis Nation—Saskatchewan regions ===
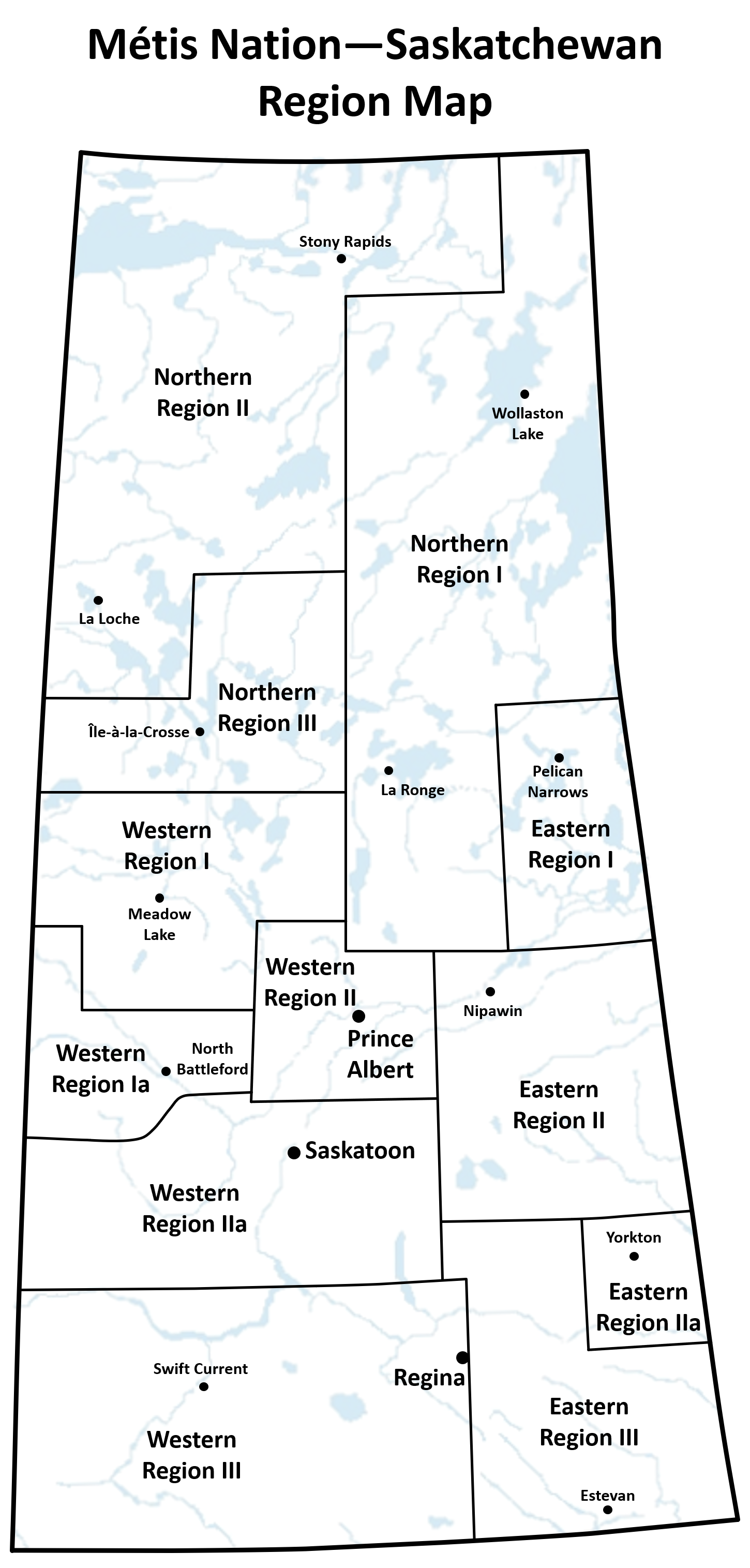
Map of the 12 regions of Métis Nation—Saskatchewan

The Métis Nation—Saskatchewan (MNS) is the federally-recognized representative body of the Métis in Saskatchewan. The MNS divides its membership into twelve regions.

- Eastern Region 1, including one local in Cumberland House
- Eastern Region 2, including nine locals in Melfort and other communities
- Eastern Region 2A, including seven locals in Yorkton and other communities
- Eastern Region 3, including nine locals in Fort Qu'Appelle and other communities
- Northern Region 1, including five locals in Weyakwin and other communities
- Northern Region 2, including seven locals in La Loche and other communities
- Northern Region 3, including ten locals in Green Lake and other communities
- Western Region 1, including ten locals in Meadow Lake and other communities
- Western Region 1A, including four locals in Lloydminster and other communities
- Western Region 2, including thirteen locals in Prince Albert and other communities
- Western Region 2A, including seven locals in Saskatoon and other communities
- Western Region 3, including six locals in Willow Bunch and other communities

== See also ==
- Geography of Saskatchewan
