= Canadian federal election results in Northern Saskatchewan =

Seats obtained by party

Conservative
New Democratic
Liberal
Alliance (defunct)
Reform (defunct)
Progressive Conservative (defunct)
Co-operative Commonwealth (defunct)
Unity / United Reform (defunct)

This is page shows results of Canadian federal elections in the northern part of the province of Saskatchewan.

== Regional profile ==
Like southern Saskatchewan, the northern areas traditionally feature a strong urban-rural split, although it is less pronounced here. The Conservatives swept here in 2004 and the former Canadian Alliance also nearly swept the region in 2000. The rural areas (except for far Northern Saskatchewan) are almost as conservative as their counterparts in Alberta. The far north with its high first nations population has stronger support for the New Democrats and Liberals, and the Liberals were able to pick up the far northern seat in 2006 in a controversial close election. While Saskatoon also has large Liberal support as well as traditional NDP support, this was diluted for much of the early part of the millennium by the riding map. While Saskatoon has double the population of a typical Canadian urban riding, until 2015 the surrounding rural areas were thought to be too thinly populated for ridings of their own. As a result, for almost two decades Saskatoon's four federal ridings included large blocks of rural territory, a major reason why the NDP and Liberals were shut out in Saskatoon from 2000 to 2015.

With the 2015 redistribution, Saskatoon is split between three ridings located almost entirely within the city limits. The NDP won one Saskatoon seat in 2015, and also took the far northern seat. Those gains were reversed in 2019, as the massive Conservative wave that swept through Saskatchewan saw the party sweep every seat in the province.

=== Votes by party throughout time ===
Vote share by party

Liberal
Conservative
New Democratic
Green
People's
Progressive Conservative (defunct)
Social Credit (defunct)
Reform (defunct)
Alliance (defunct)

== 2021 ==
Electoral district	Candidates						Incumbent
Electoral district	Liberal	Conservative	NDP	Green	PPC	Other	Incumbent
Battlefords—Lloydminster	Larry Ingram; 1,748; 5.63%	Rosemarie Falk; 21,336; 68.72%	Erik Hansen; 3,718; 11.98%	Kerri Wall; 237; 0.76%	Terry Sieben; 1,847; 5.95%	Ken Rutherford (Mav.); 2,162; 6.96%	Rosemarie Falk
Carlton Trail—Eagle Creek	Harrison Andruschak; 2,066; 5.03%	Kelly Block; 28,192; 68.61%	Shannon O'Toole; 5,608; 13.65%	Cherese Reemaul; 379; 0.92%	Micheal Bohach; 3,791; 9.23%	Diane Pastoor (Mav.); 1,053; 2.56%	Kelly Block
Desnethé—Missinippi—Churchill River	Buckley Belanger; 5,533; 26.89%	Gary Vidal; 10,036; 48.78%	Harmonie King; 3,548; 17.25%	Nasser Dean Chalifoux; 215; 1.05%	Dezirae Reddekopp; 1,002; 4.87%	Stephen King (Ind.); 240; 1.17%	Gary Vidal
Prince Albert	Estelle Hjertaas; 3,653; 10.61%	Randy Hoback; 22,340; 64.89%	Ken MacDougall; 5,214; 15.15%	Hamish Graham; 364; 1.06%	Joseph McCrea; 2,388; 6.94%	Heather Schmitt (Mav.); 466; 1.35%	Randy Hoback
Saskatoon—Grasswood	Rokhan Sarwar; 6,460; 14.17%	Kevin Waugh; 22,760; 49.91%	Kyla Kitzul; 13,720; 30.09%	Gillian Walker; 556; 1.22%	Mark Friesen; 2,108; 4.62%		Kevin Waugh
Saskatoon—University	Dawn Dumont Walker; 4,608; 10.84%	Corey Tochor; 20,389; 47.95%	Claire Card; 15,042; 35.38%	North-Marie Hunter; 405; 0.95%	Guto Penteado; 1,778; 4.18%	Jeremy Fisher (Comm.); 100 0.24%	Corey Tochor
Saskatoon—University	Dawn Dumont Walker; 4,608; 10.84%	Corey Tochor; 20,389; 47.95%	Claire Card; 15,042; 35.38%	North-Marie Hunter; 405; 0.95%	Guto Penteado; 1,778; 4.18%	Carl A Wesolowski (CHP); 195 0.46%	Corey Tochor
Saskatoon West	Ruben Rajakumar; 2,778; 8.19%	Brad Redekopp; 15,379; 45.36%	Robert Doucette; 13,328; 39.31%	Dave Greenfield; 357; 1.05%	Kevin Boychuk; 2,064; 6.09%		Brad Redekopp

== 2019 ==
Electoral district	Candidates						Incumbent
Electoral district	Liberal	Conservative	NDP	Green	PPC	Other	Incumbent
Battlefords—Lloydminster	Larry Ingram; 2,426; 6.77%	Rosemarie Falk; 28,030; 78.25%	Marcella Pedersen; 4,098; 11.44%	David Kim-Cragg; 605; 1.69%	Jason MacInnis; 662; 1.85%		Rosemarie Falk
Carlton Trail—Eagle Creek	Rebecca Malo; 2,085; 4.64%	Kelly Block; 35,313; 78.56%	Jasmine Calix; 5,535; 12.31%	Dean Gibson; 873; 1.94%	Cody Payant; 799; 1.78%	Glenn Wright (Ind.); 344; 0.77%	Kelly Block
Desnethé—Missinippi—Churchill River	Tammy Cook-Searson; 7,225; 26.51%	Gary Vidal; 11,531; 42.30%	Georgina Jolibois; 7,741; 28.40%	Sarah Kraynick; 543; 1.99%	Jerome Perrault; 217; 0.80%		Georgina Jolibois
Prince Albert	Estelle Hjertaas; 4,107; 10.34%	Randy Hoback; 26,891; 67.72%	Harmony Johnson-Harder; 6,925; 17.44%	Kerri Wall; 839; 2.11%	Kelly Day; 778; 1.96%	Brian Littlepine (VCP); 170; 0.43%	Randy Hoback
Saskatoon—Grasswood	Tracy Muggli; 8,419; 17.03%	Kevin Waugh; 26,336; 53.27%	Erika Ritchie; 12,672; 25.63%	Neil Sinclair; 1,320; 2.67%	Mark Friesen; 692; 1.40%		Kevin Waugh
Saskatoon—University	Susan Hayton; 6,146; 13.07%	Corey Tochor; 24,514; 52.13%	Claire Card; 13,994; 29.76%	Jan Norris; 1,401; 2.98%	Guto Penteado; 667; 1.42%	Jeff Willerton (CHP); 305; 0.65%	Brad Trost§
Saskatoon West	Shah Rukh; 2,863; 7.34%	Brad Redekopp; 18,597; 47.70%	Sheri Benson; 15,708; 40.29%	Shawn Setyo; 1,042; 2.67%	Isaac Hayes; 775; 1.99%		Sheri Benson

== 2015 ==
Electoral district	Candidates					Incumbent
Electoral district	Conservative	NDP	Liberal	Green	Other	Incumbent
Battlefords—Lloydminster	Gerry Ritz; 20,547; 61.01%	Glenn Tait; 5,930; 17.61%	Larry Ingram; 5,550; 16.48%	Mikaela Tenkink; 575; 1.71%	Doug Anguish (Ind.); 1,076; 3.19%	Gerry Ritz
Carlton Trail—Eagle Creek	Kelly Block; 26,004; 64.72%	Glenn Wright; 7,499; 18.66%	Alexander Slusar; 5,774; 14.37%	Lynn Wesley Oliphant; 902; 2.24%		Maurice Vellacott†; Saskatoon—Wanuskewin
Desnethé—Missinippi— Churchill River (judicial recount)	Rob Clarke; 9,105; 30.14%	Georgina Jolibois; 10,319; 34.15%	Lawrence Joseph; 10,237; 33.88%	Warren Koch; 552; 1.83%		Rob Clarke
Prince Albert	Randy Hoback; 19,673; 49.79%	Lon Borgerson; 11,244; 28.46%	Gordon Kirkby; 7,832; 19.82%	Byron Tenkink; 761; 1.93%		Randy Hoback
Saskatoon—Grasswood	Kevin Waugh; 19,166; 41.59%	Scott Bell; 13,909; 30.18%	Tracy Muggli; 12,165; 26.40%	Mark Bigland-Pritchard; 846; 1.84%		Lynne Yelich§ Blackstrap
Saskatoon—University	Brad Trost; 18,592; 41.53%	Claire Card; 14,115; 31.53%	Cynthia Marie Block; 11,287; 25.21%	Valerie Harvey; 686; 1.53%	Eric Matthew Schalm (Rhino.); 93; 0.22%	Brad Trost; Saskatoon—Humboldt
Saskatoon West	Randy Donauer; 12,401; 32.88%	Sheri Benson; 14,921; 39.56%	Lisa Abbott; 9,234; 24.48%	Lois Carol Mitchell; 658; 1.74%	Bronek Hart (Libert.); 230 0.61%	Kelly Block‡ Saskatoon—Rosetown—Biggar
Saskatoon West	Randy Donauer; 12,401; 32.88%	Sheri Benson; 14,921; 39.56%	Lisa Abbott; 9,234; 24.48%	Lois Carol Mitchell; 658; 1.74%	Jim Pankiw (Canada); 271 0.72%	Kelly Block‡ Saskatoon—Rosetown—Biggar

== 2011 ==
Electoral district	Candidates					Incumbent
Electoral district	Conservative	Liberal	NDP	Green	Other	Incumbent
Battlefords—Lloydminster	Gerry Ritz; 19,203; 66.90%	Jordan LaPlante; 950; 3.31%	Glenn Tait; 7,767; 27.06%	Norbert Kratchmer; 785; 2.73%		Gerry Ritz
Blackstrap	Lynne Yelich; 23,280; 54.40%	Deborah J. Walker; 2,713; 6.34%	Darien Moore; 15,769; 36.85%	Shawn Setyo; 1,033; 2.41%		Lynne Yelich
Desnethé—Missinippi— Churchill River	Rob Gordon Clarke; 10,509; 47.93%	Gabe Lafond; 1,144; 5.22%	Lawrence Joseph; 9,715; 44.30%	George Morin; 560; 2.55%		Rob Clarke
Prince Albert	Randy Hoback; 19,214; 62.17%	Ron Wassill; 1,070; 3.46%	Valerie Mushinski; 9,841; 31.84%	Myk Brazier; 666; 2.15%	Craig Leonard Batley (CAP); 116; 0.38%	Randy Hoback
Saskatoon—Humboldt	Brad Trost; 19,954; 52.72%	Darren Hill; 3,013; 7.96%	Denise Kouri; 13,271; 35.07%	Sandra Finley; 926; 2.45%	Jim Pankiw (Ind.); 682; 1.80%	Brad Trost
Saskatoon—Rosetown— Biggar	Kelly Block; 14,652; 48.70%	Lee Reaney; 697; 2.32%	Nettie Wiebe; 14,114; 46.91%	Vicki Strelioff; 626; 2.08%		Kelly Block
Saskatoon—Wanuskewin	Maurice Vellacott; 21,183; 58.43%	Patricia Zipchen; 2,428; 6.70%	John Parry; 11,395; 31.43%	Mark Bigland-Pritchard; 1,250; 3.45%		Maurice Vellacott

== 2008 ==
Electoral district	Candidates					Incumbent
Electoral district	Conservative	Liberal	NDP	Green	Other	Incumbent
Battlefords—Lloydminster	Gerry Ritz; 15,621; 60.11%	Gregory Nyholt; 2,140; 8.23%	Bob Woloshyn; 6,572; 25.29%	Norbert Kratchmer; 1,287; 4.95%	Harold Stephan (CHP); 368; 1.42%	Gerry Ritz
Blackstrap	Lynne Yelich; 20,747; 53.95%	Deb Ehmann; 5,509; 14.33%	Patti Gieni; 9,876; 25.68%	Imre Pallagi; 2,325; 6.05%		Lynne Yelich
Desnethé— Missinippi— Churchill River	Rob Clarke; 8,964; 46.67%	David Orchard; 5,816; 30.28%	Brian Morin; 3,414; 17.77%	George Morin; 733; 3.82%	Rob Ballantyne (FPNP); 282; 1.47%	Rob Clarke
Prince Albert	Randy Hoback; 16,542; 57.73%	Lou Doderai; 2,289; 7.99%	Valerie Mushinski; 8,243; 28.77%	Amanda Judith Marie Smytaniuk; 1,413; 4.93%	Craig Batley (CAP); 167; 0.58%	Brian Fitzpatrick†
Saskatoon—Humboldt	Brad Trost; 18,610; 53.80%	Karen Parhar; 4,135; 11.96%	Scott Ruston; 9,632; 27.85%	Jean-Pierre Ducasse; 2,211; 6.39%		Brad Trost
Saskatoon— Rosetown— Biggar	Kelly Block; 12,231; 45.39%	Roy Bluehorn; 1,188; 4.41%	Nettie Wiebe; 11,969; 44.42%	Amber Jones; 1,232; 4.57%	Rick Barsky (Ind.); 138 0.51%	Carol Skelton†
Saskatoon— Rosetown— Biggar	Kelly Block; 12,231; 45.39%	Roy Bluehorn; 1,188; 4.41%	Nettie Wiebe; 11,969; 44.42%	Amber Jones; 1,232; 4.57%	Marcel Leon Bourassa (CHP); 115 0.43%	Carol Skelton†
Saskatoon— Rosetown— Biggar	Kelly Block; 12,231; 45.39%	Roy Bluehorn; 1,188; 4.41%	Nettie Wiebe; 11,969; 44.42%	Amber Jones; 1,232; 4.57%	Kevin Stricker (Libert.); 73 0.27%	Carol Skelton†
Saskatoon—Wanuskewin	Maurice Vellacott; 18,320; 56.51%	Patricia Zipchen; 4,020; 12.40%	Clint Davidson; 7,898; 24.36%	Tobi-Dawne Smith; 2,182; 6.73%		Maurice Vellacott

== 2006 ==
Electoral district	Candidates					Incumbent
Electoral district	Liberal	Conservative	NDP	Green	Other	Incumbent
Battlefords—Lloydminster	Dominic LaPlante; 3,901; 12.77%	Gerry Ritz; 16,491; 53.96%	Elgin Wayne Wyatt; 4,829; 15.80%	Norbert Kratchmer; 637; 2.08%	Jim Pankiw (NA); 4,396 14.38%	Gerry Ritz
Battlefords—Lloydminster	Dominic LaPlante; 3,901; 12.77%	Gerry Ritz; 16,491; 53.96%	Elgin Wayne Wyatt; 4,829; 15.80%	Norbert Kratchmer; 637; 2.08%	Harold Stephan (CHP); 306 1.00%	Gerry Ritz
Blackstrap	Herta Barron; 6,841; 16.90%	Lynne Yelich; 19,430; 47.99%	Don Kossick; 12,376; 30.57%	Mike Fornssler; 1,334; 3.29%	Sonje Kristtorn (Comm.); 94 0.23%	Lynne Yelich
Blackstrap	Herta Barron; 6,841; 16.90%	Lynne Yelich; 19,430; 47.99%	Don Kossick; 12,376; 30.57%	Mike Fornssler; 1,334; 3.29%	D.-Jay Krozser (Ind.); 412 1.02%	Lynne Yelich
Desnethé—Missinippi— Churchill River	Gary Merasty; 10,191; 41.37%	Jeremy Harrison; 10,124; 41.09%	Anita Jackson; 3,787; 15.37%	John A. McDonald; 534; 2.17%		Jeremy Harrison
Prince Albert	Patrick Jahn; 6,149; 19.38%	Brian Fitzpatrick; 17,271; 54.44%	Valerie Mushinski; 7,562; 23.84%	Larry Zepp; 744; 2.35%		Brian Fitzpatrick
Saskatoon—Humboldt	Peter Stroh; 6,281; 16.85%	Brad Trost; 18,285; 49.07%	Andrew Mason; 10,975; 29.45%	Mike E. Jones; 1,382; 3.71%	Tim Nyborg (Ind.); 342; 0.92%	Brad Trost
Saskatoon—Rosetown—Biggar	Myron Luczka; 3,536; 12.08%	Carol Skelton; 13,331; 45.54%	Nettie Wiebe; 11,412; 38.98%	Rick Barsky; 738; 2.52%	Marcel Bourassa (CHP); 258; 0.88%	Carol Skelton
Saskatoon—Wanuskewin	Chris Axworthy; 8,655; 24.08%	Maurice Vellacott; 17,753; 49.39%	Jim Maddin; 7,939; 22.09%	Don Cameron; 1,292; 3.59%	Dale Sanders (CHP); 307; 0.85%	Maurice Vellacott

== 2004 ==
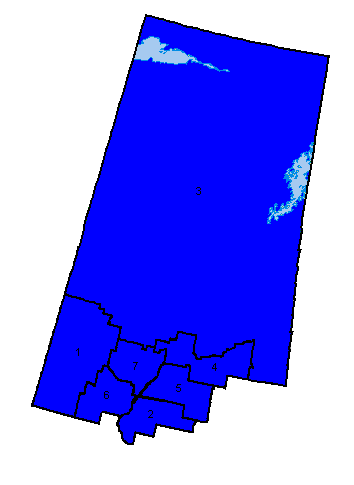
Key map

1. Battlefords—Lloydminster
2. Blackstrap
3. Desnethé—Missinippi—Churchill River
4. Prince Albert
5. Saskatoon—Humboldt
6. Saskatoon—Rosetown—Biggar
7. Saskatoon—Wanuskewin
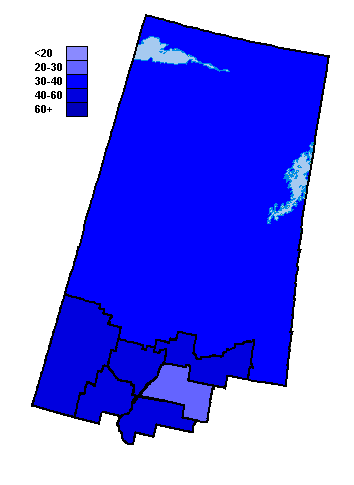
Conservative Party of Canada

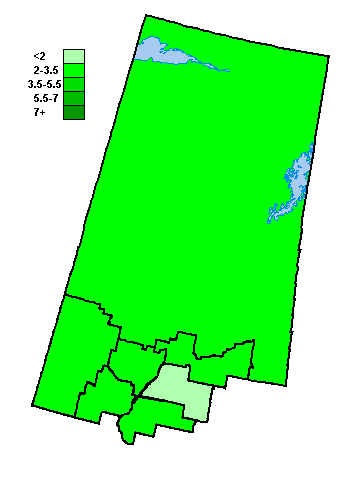
Green Party of Canada

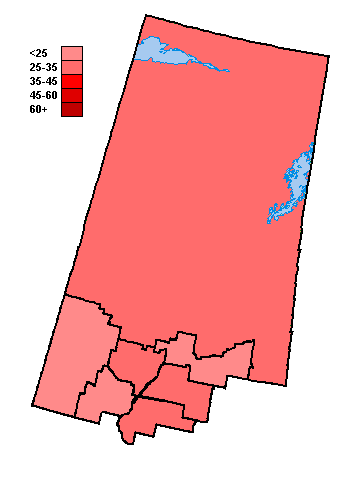
Liberal Party of Canada

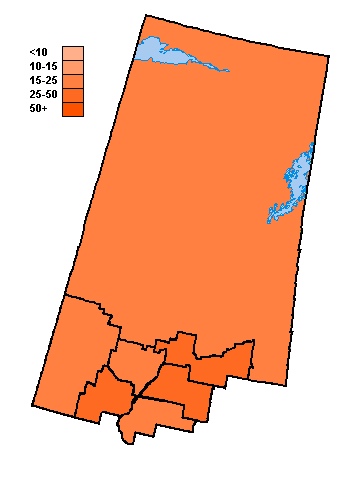
New Democratic Party
