= New Democratic Party candidates in the 2004 Canadian federal election =

The New Democratic Party ran a full slate of candidates in the 2004 federal election and elected nineteen members to become the fourth largest party in parliament.

== Alberta ==
=== Calgary ===
Riding	Candidate's Name	Notes	Residence	Occupation	Votes	%	Rank
Calgary East	Elizabeth Thomas		Calgary		3,535	9.86	3rd
Calgary North Centre	John Chan		Calgary	Environmental inspector	6,298	12.12	3rd
Calgary Northeast	Giorgio Cattabeni	ANDP candidate for Calgary-East in the 2001 Alberta provincial election NDP candidate for Calgary Southeast in the 2000 federal election	Calgary	Clerk	2,682	7.61	3rd
Calgary—Nose Hill	Vinay Dey	ANDP candidate for Calgary-Fort in the 2001 Alberta provincial election and for Calgary-Cross in the 1993 provincial election	Calgary	Accountant	3,250	6.73	3rd
Calgary South Centre	Keith Purdy	ANDP candidate for Calgary-Mountain View in the 2001 Alberta provincial election	Calgary	Labourer / Gay rights activist	4,350	8.49	4th
Calgary Southeast	Brian Pincott		Calgary	Manager	3,419	6.58	3rd
Calgary Southwest	Daria Fox		Calgary	Administrator	2,884	5.59	4th
Calgary West	Tim Patterson		Calgary	Student	3,632	6.48	4th

=== Edmonton ===
Riding	Candidate's Name	Notes	Residence	Occupation	Votes	%	Rank
Edmonton—Beaumont	Paul Reikie		Edmonton	Student (University of Alberta)	3,975	9.70	3rd
Edmonton Centre	Meghan McMaster		Edmonton	Student (Grant MacEwan College)	4,836	9.11	3rd
Edmonton East	Janina Strudwick			Administrator	6,464	14.71	3rd
Edmonton—Leduc	Doug McLachlan	ANDP candidate for Edmonton-Riverview in the 2001 Alberta provincial election	Edmonton	Lawyer	4,581	9.41	3rd
Edmonton—St. Albert	Mike Melymick		Edmonton	Train conductor	5,927	11.58	3rd
Edmonton—Sherwood Park	Chris Harwood	ANDP candidate for Sherwood Park in the 2001 Alberta provincial election	Edmonton	Driver	5,155	10.96	3rd
Edmonton—Spruce Grove	Hayley Phillips		Edmonton	Student	4,508	8.93	3rd
Edmonton Strathcona	Malcolm Azania		Edmonton	Author	11,535	23.81	3rd

=== Rural Alberta ===
Riding	Candidate's Name	Notes	Residence	Occupation	Votes	%	Rank
Athabasca	Robert Cree		Fort McMurray	Small business owner	3,115	10.47	3rd
Crowfoot	Ellen Parker		Camrose	Teacher	3,241	6.90	3rd
Lethbridge	Melanee Thomas		Granum	Student (University of Lethbridge)	4,623	9.73	3rd
Macleod	Joyce Thomas		Granum	Nurse	2,802	6.50	4th
Medicine Hat	Betty Stroh		Medicine Hat	Healthcare worker	3,643	9.17	3rd
Peace River	Susan Thompson		Peace River	Journalist	4,804	11.11	3rd
Red Deer	Jeff Sloychuk		Red Deer	Sales professional	3,500	7.81	3rd
Vegreville—Wainwright	Len Legault		Chauvin	Farmer	3,793	8.25	3rd
Westlock—St. Paul	Peggy Kirkeby		Morinville	Truck driver	3,480	8.79	3rd
Wetaskiwin	Tim Robson		Wetaskiwin	Sales professional	3,090	7.25	3rd
Wild Rose	Jeff Horvath		Canmore	Teacher	4,009	8.49	3rd
Yellowhead	Noel Lapierre	ANDP candidate for West Yellowhead in the 2001 Alberta provincial election NDP candidate for Yellowhead in the 2000 federal election Member of Hinton Town Council (1978–1983)	Hinton	Millwright	4,429	11.47	3rd

== British Columbia ==
=== British Columbia Interior ===
Riding	Candidate's Name	Notes	Residence	Occupation	Votes	%	Rank
Cariboo—Prince George	Rick Smith		Prince George	Lawyer	11,183	26.49	2nd
Kamloops—Thompson	Brian Carroll		Kamloops	Train conductor	13,379	26.19	3rd
Kelowna	Starleigh Grass		Kelowna	Student (Okanagan University College)	8,954	16.82	3rd
Kootenay—Columbia	Brent Bush		Kimberley	Postal worker	9,772	23.82	2nd
North Okanagan—Shuswap	Alice Brown		Vernon	Electrician	12,528	24.20	2nd
Okanagan—Coquihalla	Joyce Procure		Westbank	Nurse	9,509	19.55	3rd
Prince George—Peace River	Michael Hunter		Tumbler Ridge	Miner	7,501	20.70	3rd
Skeena—Bulkley Valley	Nathan Cullen		Smithers	Consultant	13,706	37.14	1st
Southern Interior	Alex Atamanenko		Castlegar	Teacher	16,260	35.13	2nd

=== Fraser Valley/Lower Mainland ===
Riding	Candidate's Name	Notes	Residence	Occupation	Votes	%	Rank
Abbotsford	Scott Fast		Abbotsford	Professor at University College of the Fraser Valley	6,575	13.64	3rd
Burnaby—Douglas	Bill Siksay	NDP candidate for Vancouver Centre in the 1997 federal election	Burnaby	Executive assistant	15,682	34.59	1st
Burnaby—New Westminster	Peter Julian	Former director of The Council of Canadians	New Westminster	Non-profit executive	14,061	33.72	1st
Chilliwack—Fraser Canyon	Rollie L. Keith	BC NDP candidate for Chilliwack in the 1996 British Columbia provincial election and for Abbotsford in the 1995 Abbotsford provincial by-election NDP candidate for Fraser Valley East in the 1993 federal election	Chilliwack	Soldier	9,244	20.59	2nd
Delta—Richmond East	Itrath Syed		Richmond	Student (University of British Columbia)	6,838	14.63	3rd
Dewdney—Alouette	Mike Bocking		Mission	Journalist	15,693	32.68	2nd
Fleetwood—Port Kells	Barry Bell	BC NDP candidate for Surrey-Tynehead in the 2001 British Columbia provincial election	Surrey	Tradesman	10,976	27.97	3rd
Langley	Dean Morrison		Langley	Painter	8,568	16.75	3rd
New Westminster—Coquitlam	Steve McClurg		New Westminster	Small business owner	15,580	32.64	2nd
Newton—North Delta	Nancy Clegg		Delta	Professor at Kwantlen University College	12,037	29.20	3rd
North Vancouver	John Nelson		North Vancouver	Consultant	8,967	15.87	3rd
Port Moody—Westwood—Port Coquitlam	Charley King		Port Coquitlam	Teacher	12,023	26.38	3rd
Richmond	Dale Jackaman		Richmond	Anti-tobacco activist / IT professional	6,142	15.01	3rd
South Surrey—White Rock—Cloverdale	H. Pummy Kaur		Fort Langley	Teacher	7,663	14.37	3rd
Surrey North	Jim Karpoff	Member of Parliament for Surrey North (1988–1993)	Surrey	Social worker	8,312	24.13	2nd
Vancouver Centre	Kennedy Stewart		Vancouver	Professor at Simon Fraser University	17,050	32.30	2nd
Vancouver East	Libby Davies	Member of Parliament for Vancouver East (1997–2015); Member of Vancouver City Council (1982–1993)	Vancouver	Human resources professional	23,452	56.46	1st
Vancouver Kingsway	Ian Waddell	Member of the British Columbia Legislative Assembly for Vancouver-Fraserview (1996–2001); Member of Parliament for Port Moody—Coquitlam—Port Coquitlam (1988–1993) and Vancouver Kingsway (1979–1988)	Vancouver	Lawyer	15,916	37.28	2nd
Vancouver Quadra	David Askew		Vancouver	Civil servant	8,348	15.00	3rd
Vancouver South	Bev Meslo	Candidate in the 2003 New Democratic Party leadership election	Vancouver	Feminist activist	10,038	24.56	3rd
West Vancouver—Sunshine Coast	Nicholas Simons		Gibsons	Social services director	13,156	21.73	3rd

=== Vancouver Island ===
Riding	Candidate's Name	Notes	Residence	Occupation	Votes	%	Rank
Esquimalt—Juan de Fuca	Randall Garrison		Esquimalt	Professor at Camosun College	16,821	30.62	2nd
Nanaimo—Alberni	Scott Fraser	Mayor of Tofino (1996–1999)	Qualicum Beach	Harbour manager	19,152	32.31	2nd
Nanaimo—Cowichan	Jean Crowder		Duncan	Human resources professional	25,243	43.71	1st
Saanich—Gulf Islands	Jennifer Burgis		Victoria	Consultant	13,763	21.58	3rd
Vancouver Island North	Catherine J. Bell	Vice-president of the British Columbia General Employees' Union	Cumberland	Union leader	18,250	34.50	2nd
Victoria	David Turner	Mayor of Victoria (1991–1993)	Victoria	Professor at the University of Victoria	18,093	31.08	2nd

== Manitoba ==
Riding	Candidate's Name	Notes	Residence	Occupation	Votes	%	Rank
Brandon—Souris	Mike Abbey		Brandon	Civil servant	6,740	19.15	3rd
Charleswood—St. James	Peter Carney	St. James-Assiniboia School Division trustee (1999–2006); NDP candidate for St. Boniface in the 1997 federal election	Winnipeg	Principal	4,283	10.15	3rd
Churchill	Bev Desjarlais	Member of Parliament for Churchill (1997–2006)	Thompson	Clerk	8,612	43.44	1st
Dauphin—Swan River	Walter Kolisnyk		Minitonas	Farmer	7,341	21.97	2nd
Elmwood—Transcona	Bill Blaikie	Member of Parliament for Winnipeg—Transcona (1988–2004) and Winnipeg—Birds Hill (1979–1988)	Winnipeg	United Church minister	15,221	51.99	1st
Kildonan—St. Paul	Lorene Mahoney		West St. Paul	Nurse	8,202	22.53	3rd
Portage—Lisgar	Daren Van den Bussche		Portage la Prairie	Firefighter	3,251	9.34	3rd
Provencher	Sarah Zaharia		Winnipeg	Consultant	3,244	9.01	3rd
Saint Boniface	Mathieu Allard		Winnipeg	Student (University of Manitoba)	6,954	18.02	3rd
Selkirk—Interlake	Duane Nicol	Member of Selkirk City Council; NDP candidate for Winnipeg South in the 2000 federal election	Selkirk	Healthcare director	10,516	26.53	2nd
Winnipeg Centre	Pat Martin	Member of Parliament for Winnipeg Centre (1997–2015)	Winnipeg	Carpenter	12,149	45.39	1st
Winnipeg North	Judy Wasylycia-Leis	Member of Parliament for Winnipeg North Centre (1997–2004); Member of the Legislative Assembly of Manitoba for St. Johns (1986–1993)	Winnipeg	Policy advisor	12,507	48.16	1st
Winnipeg South	Catherine Green		Winnipeg	Architect	4,217	11.23	3rd
Winnipeg South Centre	James Allum	NDP candidate for Winnipeg South Centre in the 2000 federal election	Winnipeg	Professor at the University of Winnipeg	8,270	21.25	3rd

== New Brunswick ==
Riding	Candidate's Name	Notes	Residence	Occupation	Votes	%	Rank
Acadie—Bathurst	Yvon Godin	Member of Parliament for Acadie—Bathurst (1997–2015)	Bathurst	Union leader (United Steelworkers)	23,857	53.93	1st
Beauséjour	Omer Bourque		Haute-Aboujagane	Fish processing worker	6,056	14.71	3rd
Fredericton	John Carty		Fredericton	Animal shelter manager	7,360	17.37	3rd
Fundy	Pat Hanratty	NB NDP candidate for Hampton-Belleisle in the 2003 New Brunswick provincial election	Hampton	Carpenter	5,417	16.19	3rd
Madawaska—Restigouche	Rodolphe Martin		Edmundston		8,737	27.59	2nd
Miramichi	Hilaire Rousselle		Saint-Wilfred	Cook	5,980	18.38	3rd
Moncton—Riverview—Dieppe	Hélène Lapointe	NB NDP candidate for Dieppe-Memramcook in the 2003 New Brunswick provincial election NDP candidate for Moncton—Riverview—Dieppe in the 2000 federal election	Dieppe	Typesetter	5,344	12.54	3rd
St. Croix—Belleisle	Patrick Webber		Fredericton	Student	3,600	11.69	3rd
Saint John	Terry Albright		Saint John	Nurse	6,926	19.06	3rd
Tobique—Mactaquac	Jason Mapplebeck		Estey's Bridge	Student	2,957	8.50	3rd

== Newfoundland and Labrador ==
Riding	Candidate's Name	Notes	Residence	Occupation	Votes	%	Rank
Avalon	Michael Kehoe	NL NDP candidate for Topsail in the 2003 Newfoundland and Labrador provincial election	Paradise	Taxi driver	3,450	10.98	3rd
Bonavista—Exploits	Samuel Robert McLean		Gander	Teacher	2,667	8.05	3rd
Humber—St. Barbe—Baie Verte	Holly Pike		Corner Brook	Professor at the Memorial University of Newfoundland	3,743	13.14	3rd
Labrador	Shawn Crann	NL NDP candidate for Bonavista South in the 1999 Newfoundland and Labrador provincial election	Happy Valley-Goose Bay	Funeral director	856	9.64	4th
Random—Burin—St. George's	Desmond McGrath	Founder of the Fish, Food and Allied Workers Union	Stephenville	Roman Catholic priest	8,797	33.23	2nd
St. John's North	Janine Piller		St. John's	Business owner	7,198	19.77	3rd
St. John's South—Mount Pearl	Peg Norman		St. John's	Healthcare manager	7,989	23.71	3rd

== Nova Scotia ==
Riding	Candidate's Name	Notes	Residence	Occupation	Votes	%	Rank
Cape Breton—Canso	Shirley Hartery		Port Hawkesbury	Teacher	9,197	24.32	2nd
Central Nova	Alexis MacDonald		Antigonish		10,470	27.66	2nd
Dartmouth—Cole Harbour	Susan MacAlpine-Gillis		Dartmouth	United Church minister	13,463	32.50	2nd
Halifax	Alexa McDonough	Member of Parliament for Halifax (1997–2008); Leader of the New Democratic Party (1995–2003); Leader of the Nova Scotia New Democratic Party (1980–1994); Member of the Nova Scotia House of Assembly for Halifax Fairview (1993–1995); Member of the Nova Scotia House of Assembly for Halifax Chebucto (1981–1993)	Halifax	Social worker	18,341	41.55	1st
Halifax West	Bill Carr		Halifax	Actor / Journalist	11,228	27.95	2nd
Kings—Hants	Skip Hambling		Delhaven	Newspaper editor	6,663	17.69	3rd
North Nova	Margaret E. Sagar		Truro	United Church minister	7,560	18.91	3rd
Sackville—Eastern Shore	Peter Stoffer	Member of Parliament for Sackville—Musquodoboit Valley—Eastern Shore (1997–2004)	Windsor Junction	Airline employee	17,925	45.77	1st
South Shore—St. Margaret's	Gordon Earle	Member of Parliament for Halifax West (1997–2000)	Upper Tantallon	Civil servant	10,140	25.70	3rd
Sydney—Victoria	John Hugh Edwards		Victoria	Instructor at St. Francis Xavier University	10,298	27.71	2nd
West Nova	Arthur Bull		Digby	Educator	9,086	21.12	3rd

== Ontario ==
=== Central Ontario ===
Riding	Candidate's Name	Notes	Residence	Occupation	Votes	%	Rank
Barrie	Peter Bursztyn		Barrie	Chemist / Professor at Georgian College and Laurentian University	5,312	10.67	3rd
Clarington—Scugog—Uxbridge	Bruce Rogers	NDP candidate for Oshawa in the 2000 federal election and for Parkdale in the 1968 federal election	Blackstock	Broadcast journalist	7,721	15.11	3rd
Dufferin—Caledon	Rita Landry		Milton		3,798	8.44	4th
Haliburton—Kawartha Lakes—Brock	Gil J. McElroy		Bobcaygeon	Small business owner	8,427	15.07	3rd
Newmarket—Aurora	Ed Chudak		Newmarket	Union official (Ontario English Catholic Teachers' Association)	5,111	9.94	3rd
Northumberland—Quinte West	Russ Christianson		Campbellford	Businessman	9,007	15.61	3rd
Peterborough	Linda Slavin	NDP candidate for Peterborough in the 1984 federal election ONDP candidate for Peterborough in the 1987 and 1985 Ontario provincial elections	Peterborough	Teacher	10,957	19.01	3rd
Simcoe—Grey	Colin Mackinnon		Wasaga Beach	Accountant	5,532	9.99	3rd
Simcoe North	Jen Hill		Orillia	Small business owner	6,162	11.29	3rd
York—Simcoe	Sylvia Gerl		Keswick	Women's shelter worker	5,314	11.25	3rd

=== Eastern Ontario/Ottawa ===
Riding	Candidate's Name	Notes	Residence	Occupation	Votes	%	Rank
Carleton—Lanark	Rick Prashaw		Kanata		6,758	10.35	3rd
Glengarry—Prescott—Russell	Martin Cauvier		Ottawa	Consultant	4,238	8.48	3rd
Kingston and the Islands	Rob Hutchison	Candidate for Kingston City Council in the 1997 Kingston municipal election	Kingston	Public housing executive	8,964	16.47	3rd
Lanark—Frontenac—Lennox and Addington	Ross Sutherland		Hartington	Nurse	7,418	13.12	3rd
Leeds—Grenville	Steve Armstrong	President of Communications, Energy and Paperworkers Union Local 28-O; ONDP candidate for Leeds—Grenville in the 2003 Ontario provincial election	Brockville	Chemical worker	5,834	11.32	3rd
Nepean—Carleton	Phil Brown		Nepean	Urban planner	6,072	9.11	3rd
Ottawa Centre	Ed Broadbent	Leader of the New Democratic Party (1975–1989); Member of Parliament for Oshawa (1979–1990) and Oshawa–Whitby (1968–1979)	Ottawa	Professor	25,734	41.05	1st
Ottawa—Orléans	Crystal Leblanc		Nepean	Manager	5,905	10.07	3rd
Ottawa South	Monia Mazigh		Ottawa	Author	8,080	13.64	3rd
Ottawa—Vanier	Ric Dagenais	ONDP candidate for Ottawa—Orléans in the 2003 Ontario provincial election	Manotick	Union official (Canadian Union of Public Employees)	9,787	18.54	3rd
Ottawa West—Nepean	Marlene Rivier	President of Ontario Public Service Employees Union Local 479; ONDP candidate for Ottawa West—Nepean in the 2003 Ontario provincial election	Britannia, Ottawa	Psychologist / Union leader	7,449	12.98	3rd
Prince Edward—Hastings	Dan Douglas		Belleville	Teacher	8,105	15.19	3rd
Renfrew—Nipissing—Pembroke	Sue McSheffrey		Renfrew	Physiotherapist	5,720	11.46	3rd
Stormont—Dundas—South Glengarry	Elaine MacDonald		Cornwall	Teacher	5,387	11.15	3rd

=== Greater Toronto Area ===
Riding	Candidate's Name	Notes	Residence	Occupation	Votes	%	Rank
Ajax—Pickering	Kevin Modeste		Pickering	Executive assistant	5,286	12.12	3rd
Beaches—East York	Peter Tabuns	Member of Toronto City Council for Riverdale (1990–1997)	Toronto	Executive director of Greenpeace Canada (1999–2004)	15,156	32.29	2nd
Bramalea—Gore—Malton	Fernando Miranda		Brampton	Engineer	6,113	14.85	3rd
Brampton—Springdale	Kathy Pounder	ONDP candidate for Brampton Centre in the 2003 Ontario provincial election	Brampton	Urban planner	8,038	19.79	3rd
Brampton West	Chris Moise	ONDP candidate for Brampton West—Mississauga in the 2003 Ontario provincial election and for Oak Ridges in the 1999 Ontario provincial election	Toronto		4,920	10.49	3rd
Burlington	David Carter Laird	ONDP candidate for Burlington in the 2003 Ontario provincial election	Burlington	Child protection worker	6,581	10.79	3rd
Davenport	Rui Pires		Toronto	Social services worker	11,292	34.13	2nd
Don Valley East	Valerie Ann Mah		Toronto	Principal	5,287	13.21	3rd
Don Valley West	David Thomas		North York	Financial professional	4,393	8.58	3rd
Eglinton—Lawrence	Max Silverman		Toronto	Student	4,886	10.38	3rd
Etobicoke Centre	John Richmond		Etobicoke	Social worker	5,174	9.91	3rd
Etobicoke—Lakeshore	Margaret Anne McHugh	ONDP candidate for Etobicoke Centre in the 2003 Ontario provincial election	Etobicoke	Healthcare manager	7,179	14.48	3rd
Etobicoke North	Cesar Martello	ONDP candidate for Bramalea—Gore—Malton—Springdale in the 2003 Ontario provincial election	Toronto	Student (York University)	3,761	12.24	3rd
Halton	Anwar Naqvi	ONDP candidate for Oakville in the 2003 Ontario provincial election	Oakville	Lawyer	4,642	8.20	3rd
Markham—Unionville	Janice Hagan	NDP candidate for Markham in the 2000 federal election ONDP candidate for Markham in the 2003 and 1999 Ontario provincial elections	Markham	Teacher	3,993	12.12	3rd
Mississauga—Brampton South	Larry Taylor	Former member of Mississauga City Council	Barrie	Real estate broker	6,411	14.80	3rd
Mississauga East—Cooksville	Jim Gill		Brampton	Clerk	4,619	11.67	3rd
Mississauga—Erindale	Simon Black		Mississauga	Social services worker / Teaching assistant	5,104	9.82	3rd
Mississauga South	Michael James Culkin		Mississauga	Student	5,004	10.50	3rd
Mississauga—Streetsville	Manjinder Rai		Mississauga	Mechanic	4,266	9.47	3rd
Oak Ridges—Markham	Pamela Courtot	ONDP candidate for Oak Ridges in the 2003 Ontario provincial election	Stouffville	Small business owner	5,430	8.79	3rd
Oakville	Alison Myrden		Burlington	Correctional officer	4,027	7.29	3rd
Oshawa	Sid Ryan	President of CUPE Ontario (1992–2009); ONDP candidate for Oshawa in the 2003 Ontario provincial election and for Scarborough Centre in the 1999 Ontario provincial election	Whitby	Union leader (Canadian Union of Public Employees)	15,352	32.24	2nd
Parkdale—High Park	Peggy Nash		Toronto	Union official (Canadian Auto Workers)	16,201	34.53	2nd
Pickering—Scarborough East	Gary Dale		West Hill, Toronto	Consultant	5,392	11.25	3rd
Richmond Hill	C. Nella Cotrupi		Richmond Hill	Lawyer	4,495	9.70	3rd
Scarborough—Agincourt	D'Arcy Palmer		Scarborough	Screenwriter	4,182	10.15	3rd
Scarborough Centre	Greg Gogan	Leader of Option Canada (1991–1993); National Party candidate for Scarborough West in the 1993 federal election	Toronto	Insurance professional	6,156	16.82	3rd
Scarborough—Guildwood	Sheila White	Daughter of Bill White	Scarborough	Advisor	5,885	16.16	3rd
Scarborough—Rouge River	Fauzia Khan		Scarborough	Journalist	3,635	9.33	4th
Scarborough Southwest	Dan Harris		Toronto	IT professional	8,471	22.31	3rd
St. Paul's	Norman Tobias		Toronto	Lawyer	8,667	15.73	3rd
Thornhill	Rick Morelli	Metropolitan Separate School Board Trustee for Downsview (1988–?)	Woodbridge	Pharmacy manager	3,671	6.98	3rd
Toronto Centre	Michael Shapcott		Toronto		12,747	23.75	2nd
Toronto—Danforth	Jack Layton	Leader of the New Democratic Party (2004–2011); Member of Toronto City Council (1994–2003 & 1982–1991)	Toronto	Professor	22,198	46.34	1st
Trinity—Spadina	Olivia Chow	Member of Toronto City Council for Trinity—Spadina (2000–2006) and Downtown (1992–2000); Toronto Board of Education Trustee (1985–1991)	Toronto	Artist/Professor at George Brown College	22,397	42.04	2nd
Vaughan	Octavia Beckles	NDP candidate for Vaughan—King—Aurora in the 2000 federal election	Woodbridge	Bank manager	4,371	8.76	3rd
Whitby—Oshawa	Maret Sadem-Thompson		Whitby	Principal	8,002	14.05	3rd
Willowdale	Yvonne Bobb	ONDP candidate for Willowdale in the 2003 Ontario provincial election NDP candidate for Willowdale in the 2000 federal election	Toronto	Civil servant	4,812	9.57	3rd
York Centre	Peter Flaherty		Toronto	Author	5,376	13.69	3rd
York South—Weston	Paul Ferreira	NDP candidate for Brampton Centre in the 1997 federal election	Toronto	Public relations professional	7,281	21.21	2nd
York West	Sandra Romano Anthony		Toronto	Nutritionist	4,228	15.29	2nd

=== Hamilton/Niagara ===
Riding	Candidate's Name	Notes	Residence	Occupation	Votes	%	Rank
Ancaster—Dundas—Flamborough—Westdale	Gordon Guyatt	NDP candidate for Ancaster—Dundas—Flamborough—Aldershot in the 2000 federal election	Dundas	Physician / Professor at McMaster University	11,557	20.91	3rd
Hamilton Centre	David Christopherson	Member of Legislative Assembly of Ontario for Hamilton West (1999–2003) and Hamilton Centre (1990–1999); Member of Hamilton City Council for Ward 4 (1985–1990)	Hamilton	Union official (United Auto Workers)	20,321	45.81	1st
Hamilton East—Stoney Creek	Tony DePaulo		Hamilton	Industrial mechanic	17,490	35.84	2nd
Hamilton Mountain	Chris Charlton	ONDP candidate for Hamilton Mountain in the 2003 and 1999 Ontario provincial elections NDP candidate for Hamilton Mountain in the 1997 federal election	Hamilton	Non-profit director	17,552	32.94	2nd
Niagara Falls	Wayne Gates		Niagara Falls	Union leader (Unifor)	10,680	20.79	3rd
Niagara West—Glanbrook	Dave Heatley		Hamilton	Industrial worker	7,681	14.82	3rd
St. Catharines	Ted Mouradian	Former president of the Ontario Real Estate Association	St. Catharines	Businessman	10,135	19.26	3rd
Welland	Jody Di Bartolomeo	NDP candidate for Erie—Lincoln in the 2000 federal election	Port Colborne	Occupational safety and health professional	14,623	29.50	2nd

=== Northern Ontario ===
Riding	Candidate's Name	Notes	Residence	Occupation	Votes	%	Rank
Algoma—Manitoulin—Kapuskasing	Carol Hughes		Hanmer	Union official (Canadian Labour Congress)	11,051	31.69	2nd
Kenora	Susan Barclay	NDP candidate for Kenora—Rainy River in the 2000 federal election	Sioux Lookout	Anglican priest	7,577	32.06	2nd
Nickel Belt (federal electoral district)	Claude Gravelle	Member of Rayside-Balfour Town Council (1997–2000)	Chelmsford	Machinist	13,980	34.50	2nd
Nipissing—Timiskaming	Dave Fluri		Sturgeon Falls	Biologist	7,354	17.05	3rd
Parry Sound—Muskoka	Jo-Anne Marie Boulding	ONDP candidate for Parry Sound—Muskoka in the 2003 Ontario provincial election	Bracebridge	Lawyer	5,171	11.77	3rd
Sault Ste. Marie	Tony Martin	Member of the Legislative Assembly of Ontario for Sault Ste. Marie (1990–2003)	Sault Ste. Marie	Social services worker	16,512	38.29	1st
Sudbury	Gerry McIntaggart	Member of Sudbury City Council (1991–2003)	Sudbury	Logistics professional	12,781	29.86	2nd
Thunder Bay—Rainy River	John Rafferty	ONDP candidate for Thunder Bay—Atikokan in the 2003 Ontario provincial election NDP candidate for Thunder Bay—Superior North in the 2000 federal election		Radio broadcaster	10,781	29.70	2nd
Thunder Bay—Superior North	Bruce Hyer		Armstrong	Ecologist	10,230	29.31	2nd
Timmins–James Bay	Charlie Angus		Cobalt	Musician / Writer	14,138	41.45	1st

=== Southwestern Ontario ===
Riding	Candidate's Name	Notes	Residence	Occupation	Votes	%	Rank
Brant	Lynn Bowering		Brantford	Consultant	11,826	22.00	3rd
Cambridge	Gary Price	Member of Cambridge City Council (1994–?)	Cambridge	Technician	10,392	20.15	3rd
Chatham-Kent—Essex	Kathleen Kevany		Chatham	Professor at the University of Western Ontario	7,538	17.13	3rd
Elgin—Middlesex—London	Tim McCallum		Dutton	Industrial worker	6,763	14.58	3rd
Essex	David Tremblay	Member of Lakeshore Town Council (1998–2000); Mayor of Tilbury North (1994–1997); Member of Tilbury North Town Council (1985–1994)	Pointe-aux-Roches	Teacher / Farmer	12,519	24.41	3rd
Grey—Bruce—Owen Sound	Sebastian Ostertag		Owen Sound	Student (University of Western Ontario)	6,516	13.08	3rd
Guelph	Phil Allt		Guelph	Small business owner	10,527	20.03	3rd
Haldimand—Norfolk	Carrie Sinkowski		Port Dover	Teaching assistant	7,143	14.35	3rd
Huron—Bruce	Grant Robertson	ONDP candidate for Huron—Bruce in the 2003 Ontario provincial election	Paisley	Ontario director of the National Farmers Union	6,707	13.08	3rd
Kitchener Centre	Richard Walsh-Bowers	NDP candidate for Kitchener—Waterloo in the 2000 federal election ONDP candidate for Waterloo—Wellington in the 2003 and 1999 Ontario provincial elections	Wallenstein	Professor at Wilfrid Laurier University	8,717	19.32	3rd
Kitchener—Conestoga	Len Carter		Kitchener	Small business owner	6,623	15.72	3rd
Kitchener—Waterloo	Edwin Laryea		Waterloo	Principal	9,267	15.92	3rd
London—Fanshawe	Irene Mathyssen	Member of the Legislative Assembly of Ontario for Middlesex (1990–1995)	Ilderton	Teacher	12,511	30.41	2nd
London North Centre	Joe Swan	Former member of London City Council	London	Homeless shelter director	12,034	24.14	3rd
London West	Gina Barber		London	Teacher	9,522	17.28	3rd
Middlesex—Kent—Lambton	Kevin Blake	Member of Wallaceburg Town Council (1991–1994)	Wallaceburg		7,376	15.06	3rd
Oxford	Zoé Dorcas Kunschner		Ingersoll	Small business owner	6,673	14.54	3rd
Perth—Wellington	Robert Roth	ONDP candidate for Cornwall in the 1987 Ontario provincial election	Stratford	Marketing consultant / Small business owner	7,027	15.62	3rd
Sarnia—Lambton	Greg Agar		Courtright	Chemical worker	7,764	16.33	3rd
Wellington—Halton Hills	Noel Duignan	Member of the Legislative Assembly of Ontario for Halton North (1990–1995)	Georgetown	Mediator	5,974	11.91	3rd
Windsor—Tecumseh	Joe Comartin	Member of Parliament for Windsor—St. Clair (2000–2004)	Windsor	Lawyer	20,037	41.85	1st
Windsor West	Brian Masse	Member of Parliament for Windsor West (2002–2025); Member of Windsor City Council (1997–2002)	Windsor	Disability support worker	20,297	45.97	1st

== Prince Edward Island ==
Riding	Candidate's Name	Notes	Residence	Occupation	Votes	%	Rank
Cardigan	Dave MacKinnon		Souris	Businessman	2,103	10.15	3rd
Charlottetown	Dody Crane	Leader of the New Democratic Party of Prince Edward Island (1989–1991)	Charlottetown	Lawyer	3,428	18.44	3rd
Egmont	Regena Kaye Russell		O'Leary	Lawyer	2,133	11.57	3rd
Malpeque	Ken Bingham	PEI NDP candidate for Park Corner-Oyster Bed in the 2003 Prince Edward Island provincial election NDP candidate for Malpeque in the 2000 federal election	New Glasgow	Businessman	1,902	10.09	3rd

== Quebec ==
=== Central Quebec ===
Riding	Candidate's Name	Notes	Residence	Occupation	Votes	%	Rank
Berthier—Maskinongé	Denis McKinnon		Louiseville	Coordinator	1,653	3.36	4th
Joliette	Jacques Trudeau	NDP candidate for Joliette in the 1997 federal election	Crabtree		1,755	3.63	4th
Lotbinière—Chutes-de-la-Chaudière	Jean Bernatchez		Saint-Nicolas	Researcher	2,091	4.75	4th
Montcalm	François Rivest		Sainte-Béatrix	Student	1,531	3.17	5th
Portneuf	Jean-François Breton		Quebec City	Political scientist	1,540	3.58	5th
Repentigny	André Cardinal		Montreal	Radio journalist	1,526	2.98	4th
Richelieu	Charles Bussières	NDP candidate for Verchères—Les Patriotes in the 2000 federal election	Montreal	Musician	1,017	2.09	4th
Saint-Maurice—Champlain	Pierre J.C. Allard		Montreal	Lawyer	1,104	2.36	4th
Trois-Rivières	Marc Tessier		Montreal	Student	1,635	3.52	4th

=== Eastern Townships/Southern Quebec ===
Riding	Candidate's Name	Notes	Residence	Occupation	Votes	%	Rank
Beauce	Philippe Giguère		Sainte-Hénédine	Student	1,443	3.05	4th
Beauharnois—Salaberry	Ligy Alakkattussery		Montreal		1,018	1.93	5th
Brome—Missisquoi	Piper Huggins	NDP candidate for Saint-Laurent—Cartierville in the 2000 election	Montreal	Businesswoman	1,177	2.66	5th
Châteauguay—Saint-Constant	Mélanie Archambault		Montreal	Student	1,704	3.33	5th
Compton—Stanstead	Martin Baller		Asbestos	Radio journalist	1,451	3.31	5th
Drummond	Blake Evans		Montreal	Student	745	2.19	5th
Mégantic—L'Érable	Alexandre Côté		Victoriaville	Security guard	1,608	3.73	4th
Richmond—Arthabaska	Jason S. Noble		Windsor	Youth pastoral worker	1,540	3.26	5th
Saint-Hyacinthe—Bagot	Joëlle Chevrier		Montreal	Executive assistant	1,204	2.52	4th
Saint-Jean	Jonathan Trépanier		Montreal	Student	1,687	3.44	4th
Shefford	Sonia Bisson		Windsor	Student	1,146	2.43	5th
Sherbrooke	Philippe Dion		Sherbrooke	Student	1,463	2.93	5th

=== Greater Montreal ===
Riding	Candidate's Name	Notes	Residence	Occupation	Votes	%	Rank
Ahuntsic	Annick Bergeron		Montreal	Lawyer	3,013	6.21	3rd
Alfred-Pellan	Benjamin Le Bel		Laval	Community development officer	1,849	3.47	4th
Bourassa	Stefano Saykaly		Saint-Leonard, Montreal	Physician	1,661	3.97	4th
Brossard—La Prairie	Nadia Alexan		Montreal	Professor	2,321	4.41	4th
Chambly—Borduas	Daniel Blouin		Saint-Jean-Baptiste	Computer specialist	2,681	4.80	4th
Hochelaga	David Gagnon		Montreal	Animator	2,510	5.49	3rd
Honoré-Mercier	François Pilon		Montreal	Civil servant	1,973	4.09	4th
Jeanne-Le Ber	Anthony Philbin		Montreal	Consultant	3,160	6.92	3rd
La Pointe-de-l'Île	André Langevin		Montreal	Political scientist	1,751	3.79	4th
Lac-Saint-Louis	Daniel Quinn		Pointe-Claire	Student	3,789	7.54	4th
LaSalle—Émard	Rebecca Blaikie		Montreal	Educator	1,995	4.37	4th
Laurier	François Grégoire		Montreal	Professor	5,779	12.08	3rd
Laval	Alain Giguère	NDP candidate for Roberval in the 2000, 1997, and 1993 federal elections and for Verdun—Saint-Paul in the 1984 federal election NDPQ candidate for Saint-Henri in the 1985 Quebec provincial election	Laval	Lawyer	1,998	4.10	4th
Laval—Les Îles	Paul Michaud		Laval	Chemist	2,202	4.39	4th
Longueuil	Nicole Fournier-Sylvester		Montreal	Community organizer	2,512	5.19	3rd
Marc-Aurèle-Fortin	Lyse Généreux		Laval		1,867	3.57	5th
Mount Royal	Sébastien Beaudet		Montreal	Student	1,859	4.91	4th
Notre-Dame-de-Grâce—Lachine	Maria Pia Chávez		Montreal	Teacher	3,513	7.93	4th
Outremont	Omar Aktouf		Verdun, Montreal	Professor	5,382	14.06	3rd
Papineau	André Frappier		Montreal	Postal worker	3,603	8.77	3rd
Pierrefonds—Dollard	Danielle Lustgarten		Pierrefonds, Montreal	Researcher	2,545	5.47	4th
Rivière-des-Mille-Îles	Nicolas Du Cap		Deux-Montagnes	Student	1,559	3.42	5th
Rosemont—La Petite-Patrie	Benoît Beauchamp		Montreal	Teacher	3,876	7.67	3rd
Saint-Bruno—Saint-Hubert	Marie Henretta		Mont-Saint-Hilaire	Teacher	2,253	4.43	4th
Saint-Lambert	Monique Garcia		Longueuil	Student	2,130	4.72	4th
Saint-Laurent—Cartierville	Zaid Mahayni		Saint-Laurent, Montreal	Lawyer	2,630	6.25	3rd
Saint-Léonard—Saint-Michel	Laura Colella		Saint-Leonard, Montreal	Student	2,422	5.98	3rd
Terrebonne—Blainville	Normand Beaudet		Blainville	Consultant	1,451	3.16	5th
Vaudreuil—Soulanges	Bert Markgraf		Hudson	Engineer	2,175	3.90	4th
Verchères—Les Patriotes	Simon Vallée		Boucherville	Student	1,815	3.68	4th
Westmount—Ville-Marie	Eric Wilson Steedman		Montreal	Consultant	4,795	11.99	3rd

=== Northern Quebec ===
Riding	Candidate's Name	Notes	Residence	Occupation	Votes	%	Rank
Abitibi—Témiscamingue	Dennis Shushack		Rouyn-Noranda	Industrial mechanic	1,472	3.39	4th
Chicoutimi—Le Fjord	Éric Dubois		Chicoutimi	Community organizer	1,699	3.73	4th
Jonquière—Alma	François Picard		Alma	Student	1,561	3.40	4th
Manicouagan	Pierre Ducasse		Sept-Îles	Consultant	3,361	10.33	3rd
Nunavik—Eeyou	Pierre Corbeil		Montreal	Marketing professional	1,097	3.94	4th
Roberval	Isabelle Tremblay		Saint-Prime	Student	1,777	5.11	4th

=== Quebec City/Gaspe/Eastern Quebec ===
Riding	Candidate's Name	Notes	Residence	Occupation	Votes	%	Rank
Beauport	Xavier Trégan		Loretteville, Quebec City	Researcher	1,896	4.09	4th
Charlesbourg	François Villeneuve		Toronto	Student	1,623	3.51	4th
Charlevoix—Montmorency	Steeve Hudon		Charlesbourg, Quebec City	Student	1,055	2.52	5th
Gaspésie—Îles-de-la-Madeleine	Philip Toone	NDP candidate for Champlain in the 2000 federal election	Maria	Student	805	2.09	5th
Lévis—Bellechasse	Louise Foisy		Lévis	Social Worker	1,910	3.86	5th
Louis-Hébert	Robert Turcotte		Cap-Rouge, Quebec City	Lecturer	3,112	5.57	4th
Louis-Saint-Laurent	Christopher Bojanowski		Montreal	Fisherman	1,369	3.05	4th
Matapédia—Matane	Jean-Guy Côté		Mont-Joli	Composer	1,581	4.99	4th
Québec	Jean-Marie Fiset		Quebec City	Hospital employee	2,670	5.55	4th
Rimouski—Témiscouata	Guy Caron		Rimouski	Economist	2,717	7.05	4th
Rivière-du-Loup—Montmagny	Frédérick Garon		Montreal	Customer service professional	876	1.98	5th

=== Western Quebec/Laurentides/Outaouais ===
Riding	Candidate's Name	Notes	Residence	Occupation	Votes	%	Rank
Argenteuil—Mirabel	Elizabeth Clark	NDP candidate for Beauharnois—Salaberry in the 2000 federal election and for Rimouski—Mitis in the 1997 federal election	Montreal	Research ethics professional	1,493	3.04	5th
Gatineau	Dominique Vaillancourt		Ottawa	Translator	2,610	5.72	4th
Hull-Aylmer	Pierre Laliberté		Gatineau	Economist	5,709	11.87	3rd
Laurentides—Labelle	Brendan Naef		La Conception	Student	1,320	2.69	5th
Pontiac	Gretchen Schwarz		Shawville	Teacher	2,317	5.79	4th
Rivière-du-Nord	François Côté		Montreal	Lawyer	1,290	2.93	4th

== Saskatchewan ==
Riding	Candidate's Name	Notes	Residence	Occupation	Votes	%	Rank
Battlefords—Lloydminster	Shawn McKee	Former president of Communications, Energy and Paperworkers Union of Canada Local 658A	Lloydminster	Labourer	5,367	20.25	2nd
Blackstrap	Don Kossick		Saskatoon	Consultant	8,862	23.55	3rd
Churchill River	Earl Cook		La Ronge	Healthcare manager	3,910	20.09	3rd
Cypress Hills—Grasslands	Jeff Potts		Swift Current		4,901	16.50	3rd
Palliser	Dick Proctor	Member of Parliament for Palliser (1997–2004)	Regina	Consultant	11,785	35.48	2nd
Prince Albert	Don Hovdebo	Son of Stan Hovdebo	Birch Hills	Farmer	7,221	25.15	2nd
Regina—Lumsden—Lake Centre	Moe Kovatch		Regina	Small business owner	8,300	26.79	3rd
Regina—Qu'Appelle	Lorne Nystrom	Member of Parliament for Regina—Qu'Appelle (1997–2004); Member of Parliament for Yorkton—Melville (1968–1993)	Regina	Consultant	9,151	32.69	2nd
Saskatoon—Humboldt	Nettie Wiebe	President of the National Farmers Union (1995–1998); Candidate in the 2001 Saskatchewan New Democratic Party leadership election	Delisle	Professor at the University of Saskatchewan	9,027	25.57	2nd
Saskatoon—Rosetown—Biggar	Dennis Gruending	Member of Parliament for Saskatoon—Rosetown—Biggar (1999–2000)	Saskatoon	Journalist	9,597	36.24	2nd
Saskatoon—Wanuskewin	Priscilla Settee		Saskatoon	Professor at the University of Saskatchewan	5,770	17.81	3rd
Souris—Moose Mountain	Robert Stringer	Sask NDP candidate for Moosomin in the 2003 Saskatchewan provincial election	Wolseley	Massage therapist	4,202	13.72	4th
Wascana	Erin Weir		Regina	Student	5,771	16.04	3rd
Yorkton—Melville	Don Olson	Mayor of Sturgis	Sturgis	Self-employed	5,890	18.59	2nd

== The Territories ==
Riding	Candidate's Name	Notes	Residence	Occupation	Votes	%	Rank
Nunavut	Bill Riddell		Iqaluit	Professor at Nunavut Arctic College / Justice of the peace	1,129	15.17	3rd
Western Arctic	Dennis Bevington	Mayor of Fort Smith (1988–1997)	Fort Smith	Small business owner	5,264	39.06	2nd
Yukon	Pam Boyde		Whitehorse	Consultant	3,216	25.67	2nd
