= Donald Ravis =

Canadian politician

Donald Paul Ravis

Member of the Canadian Parliament for Saskatoon East
- In office 1984–1988
- Preceded by: Robert Ogle
- Succeeded by: District was abolished in 1987

Personal details
- Born: 28 February 1940 (age 86) Vanda, Saskatchewan
- Party: Progressive Conservative

Donald Paul Ravis (born 28 February 1940) was a Progressive Conservative party member of the House of Commons of Canada. He was a businessman and reservist by career.

He was elected at Saskatoon East electoral district in the 1984 federal election, thus he served in the 33rd Canadian Parliament. In the 1988 federal election by, his riding became Saskatoon—Humboldt and he was defeated by Stan Hovdebo of the New Democratic Party.
