= Robert Ogle =

Canadian politician (1928–1998)

The Reverend Bob Ogle OC SOM

Member of the Canadian Parliament for Saskatoon East
- In office 1979–1984
- Preceded by: New constituency
- Succeeded by: Donald Ravis

Personal details
- Born: Robert Joseph Ogle; 24 December 1928 Rosetown, Saskatchewan
- Died: 1 April 1998 (aged 69) Saskatoon, Saskatchewan
- Party: New Democratic Party
- Education: St. Peter's Seminary; University of Ottawa

Robert Joseph Ogle OC SOM (24 December 1928 – 1 April 1998), known as Bob Ogle and Father Bob, was a Canadian Roman Catholic priest, broadcaster, and member of the House of Commons.

== Early life and career ==
Ogle was born on 24 December 1928 in Rosetown, Saskatchewan, to Quebec-born parents Henry Ogle and Annie Brennan. Devout Irish Catholics, his parents had him baptized the next day, on Christmas Day. He grew up in poverty on farms in Saskatchewan and was an altar boy, an air cadet, and a boy scout in his youth.

Ogle studied at St. Peter's Seminary in London, Ontario, from 1946 to 1953 and was ordained to the priesthood in May 1953. After ordination, he became a parish priest in Saskatoon, Saskatchewan, where he founded the Catholic Centre, and went on to be appointed rector of St. Pius X Seminary. He later received a Doctor of Canon Law degree from the University of Ottawa.

== Political career and later life ==
Ogle was elected to the House of Commons as a New Democratic Party candidate for the newly defined Saskatchewan riding of Saskatoon East in the 1979 Canadian federal election. He defeated the incumbent Liberal Member of Parliament, Otto Lang, the federal Minister of Justice in Prime Minister Pierre Trudeau's cabinet, who had represented the predecessor riding of Saskatoon—Humboldt since 1968. After the defeat of Joe Clark's Progressive Conservative government on a motion of no confidence ended the 31st Canadian Parliament, Ogle was re-elected in the 1980 election. He served as the NDP's critic for external affairs from 1981 until 1984. He did not seek re-election in the 1984 federal election, following instructions from the Vatican, in conformity with the new Code of Canon Law, which stipulates: "Clerics are forbidden to assume public office whenever it means sharing in the exercise of civil power".

He was the author of four books:

- Faculties of Military Chaplains (1957)
- When the Snake Bites the Sun (1977)
- North-South Calling (1986)
- A Man of Letters (1990)

In 1989, he was made an Officer of the Order of Canada for "his tireless efforts to foster Canada's understanding of her role in global progress". In 1995, he was awarded the Saskatchewan Order of Merit.

He died on 1 April 1998 in Saskatoon. The St. Pius X Seminary at the University of Saskatchewan was renamed Ogle Hall after his death.
