= Canada Party (2015) =

Canada Party Parti Canada
- Leader: Jim Pankiw
- Founder: Jim Pankiw
- Founded: September 15, 2015 (registered)
- Dissolved: September 9, 2016
- Headquarters: Saskatoon, Saskatchewan
- Ideology: Cannabis legalization Right-libertarianism; Senate reform Canadian nationalism
- Political position: Right-wing
- Colours: Blue, yellow

Website
- www.canadaparty.ca

The Canada Party (French: Parti Canada) was a Canadian political party founded in 2015 and led by former Member of Parliament Jim Pankiw. The party's ideology and platform was outlined in the Gold Book - the party's manifesto, and being party leader Pankiw ran in Saskatoon West as the party's only candidate in the 2015 federal election.

Pankiw received 271 votes, 0.719 percent in that riding, 0.002 percent of all votes cast in Canada.

The party was deregistered by Elections Canada on September 9, 2016.
