= Georgette Sheridan =

Canadian politician, lawyer and judge

Member of Parliament for Saskatoon—Humboldt
- In office 1993–1997
- Preceded by: Stan Hovdebo
- Succeeded by: Jim Pankiw

Associate Justice of the Tax Court of Canada
- In office 19 June 2003 – May 1, 2015

Personal details
- Born: 12 June 1952 (age 73) Calgary, Alberta
- Party: Liberal party
- Profession: businessperson, columnist, lawyer

Georgette Anne Sheridan (born 12 June 1952) is a Canadian lawyer and politician from Saskatchewan.

== Biography ==
She was born on 12 June 1952 in Calgary, Alberta. She graduated B.Ed. in 1975, and LL.B. in 1982, both from the University of Saskatchewan. She was admitted to the bar of Saskatchewan in 1983, and practised law.

She was a member of the House of Commons of Canada from 1993 to 1997. She was elected in the Saskatoon—Humboldt electoral district as a Liberal candidate in the 1993 federal election, and sat in the 35th Canadian Parliament. Sheridan retired from politics after losing to Reform candidate Jim Pankiw in the 1997 election.

She was appointed to the Tax Court of Canada on June 19, 2003, and resigned from the bench on May 1, 2015.
