= Jim Pankiw =

Canadian politician

Leader of the Canada Party
- In office September 15, 2015 – September 9, 2016
- Preceded by: Party founded
- Succeeded by: Party dissolved

Member of Parliament for Saskatoon—Humboldt
- In office June 2, 1997 – June 28, 2004
- Preceded by: Georgette Sheridan
- Succeeded by: Brad Trost

Personal details
- Born: August 7, 1966 (age 59) Unity, Saskatchewan, Canada
- Party: Canada Party
- Other political affiliations: Reform (1997–2000); Canadian Alliance (2000–2001); Democratic Representative Caucus (2001–2002)
- Spouse(s): Valerie Pankiw (nee Davidovic) Children: Stephanie and Vanessa
- Profession: Chiropractor

James K. Pankiw (born August 7, 1966) is a Canadian politician and former Member of Parliament.

Pankiw served two terms in the House of Commons of Canada, representing Saskatoon—Humboldt in Saskatchewan from 1997 until 2004 as a member of the Reform Party of Canada, the Canadian Alliance, the Democratic Representative Caucus and finally as an independent MP. He is the founder and was the only leader of the Canada Party before its dissolution.

== Early life ==
Pankiw was raised by his father, George, in Unity, Saskatchewan. His mother died when he was young. After training as a chiropractor, Pankiw was first elected to the House of Commons of Canada in the 1997 federal election as a member of the Reform Party. He won a plurality of 220 votes over runner-up Dennis Gruending of the New Democratic Party.

== Political career ==
=== Controversy ===
In 2000, Pankiw wrote a letter to the president of the University of Saskatchewan, Peter MacKinnon, condemning the university's affirmative action policies and comparing its supporters to those of the Ku Klux Klan. The letter led to a heated debate between Pankiw and Saskatchewan Liberal cabinet minister Jack Hillson on the university campus.

At the time of the 2000 election, Pankiw was a member of Reform's successor, the Canadian Alliance. He ran into opposition during his on-campus debate with the Liberal candidate, former MP Morris Bodnar. Owing to strong support from the rural areas of the constituency, Pankiw won re-election with a plurality of 6,360 votes.

=== Expulsion ===
Pankiw joined with a small group of Alliance MPs informally led by Chuck Strahl that called for the resignation of party leader Stockwell Day. As a result, Pankiw was suspended and eventually expelled from the Alliance caucus and party. After joining with other expellees to form the Democratic Representative Caucus (DRC), Pankiw sat with other DRC members in the Progressive Conservative–DRC coalition.

The election of Stephen Harper as leader of the Alliance resulted in the dissolution of the PC–DRC coalition and in most of the DRC members returning to the Alliance fold. Pankiw also applied for re-admission. However, by this time he was involved in another controversy, after an Aboriginal lawyer alleged that an inebriated Pankiw had made lewd gestures to him in a Saskatoon bar, and challenged him to a fight. For this reason, he was denied re-admission to the Alliance and became an independent MP. He was refused membership in the merged Conservative Party of Canada for the same reason.

=== Mayoralty election ===
In the 2003 Saskatoon mayoral election, Pankiw ran against the unpopular incumbent Jim Maddin. Those opposed to him raised billboards reading "Racism-Free Zone — No Pankiw, Thank You". In response, Pankiw distributed flyers claiming that it was his opponents who were racist. The revelation that Pankiw had recently purchased a home outside the Saskatoon city limits also attracted criticism since his mayoral application said he resided in the Forest Grove neighbourhood in northeast Saskatoon.

Pankiw finished ahead of Maddin in third place, behind runner-up Peter Zakreski. Don Atchison was elected mayor. Voter turnout exceeded 50 percent, a level almost unheard of in a Canadian municipal election.

=== Re-election and return campaigns ===
Pankiw sought re-election in the 2004 federal election, against Conservative candidate Brad Trost, Liberal Patrick Wolfe, and New Democrat Nettie Wiebe. He received 7,076 votes, achieving fourth place, 2,368 votes behind the winner, Trost.

Pankiw was defeated again in the 2006 federal election in the Battlefords—Lloydminster constituency by Conservative Gerry Ritz. Ritz had represented Battlefords—Lloydminster since the 1997 election, which he won after defeating Pankiw's father George in a heated contest for the Reform Party nomination.

On February 4, 2010, Pankiw announced that he would again run as an independent candidate in the 2011 federal election, in his old riding of Saskatoon—Humboldt. In the press conference in which he announced his candidacy, Pankiw informed the news reporters that he had invited that he did not need the media to win, saying he'd only invited them to "rub it in your face". One reporter, concerned about Pankiw's demeanor, asked him if he was sober. Pankiw refused to answer, calling the question "extraneous". Pankiw finished last in a field of five candidates, receiving only 679 votes, compared to 19,930 votes for the winning incumbent Trost.

In the 2015 federal election, Pankiw ran as a candidate in the recreated Saskatoon West riding for the Canada Party which he had created. He finished fifth in a field of six candidates; NDP candidate Sheri Benson won the seat.

== Personal and legal troubles ==
In October 2011, Pankiw was charged with impaired driving from an incident occurring on July 26, 2011. His lawyer entered a plea of not guilty to the charge on May 16, 2012. In 2014 he was found guilty, fined $1000 and banned from driving for one year. On May 3, 2016, a unanimous Court of Appeal for Saskatchewan reversed the impaired driving conviction of Pankiw and entered a judicial stay of proceedings.

On three occasions, Pankiw was found guilty of professional misconduct by the Chiropractor's Association of Saskatchewan, the professional organization of his profession. The convictions leads to fines and temporary suspensions, which Pankiw appealed through the court system. He appealed the convictions all the way to the Supreme Court of Canada, arguing that he had been misled into delaying his appeal beyond the 30-day limit. However, the high court refused to hear the appeal. Pankiw's appeal of the sentence was dismissed by the Court of Queen's Bench in January 2014.

In February 2020, Pankiw was charged with causing a drunken disturbance. After returning to Canada on a flight from the Dominican Republic, he deboarded the plane during a layover and ran onto the tarmac, jumped a razor-wire fence, and was found at a nearby museum. When a flight attendant attempted to intervene, he said, “You get your hands off me. You can’t touch me. That’s assault. Call 9-1-1.”

== Electoral record ==
2015 Canadian federal election: Saskatoon West
Party	Candidate	Votes	%	±%	Expenditures
New Democratic	Sheri Benson	14,921	39.56	-11.57	$138,813.32
Conservative	Randy Donauer	12,401	32.88	-9.66	$120,540.81
Liberal	Lisa Abbott	9,234	24.48	+20.71	$27,228.57
Green	Lois Carol Mitchell	658	1.74	-0.83	$248.05
Canada Party	Jim Pankiw	271	0.72	–	$22,678.24
Libertarian	Bronek Hart	230	0.61	–	$603.00
Total valid votes/expense limit		37,715	99.55		$192,280.99
Total rejected ballots		170	0.45	–	
Turnout		37,885	66.44	–	
Eligible voters		57,021			
New Democratic notional hold		Swing		-0.33	
Source: Elections Canada
