= Carol Skelton =

Canadian politician

The Honourable Carol Skelton PC

Member of Parliament for Saskatoon—Rosetown—Biggar
- In office November 27, 2000 – October 14, 2008
- Preceded by: Dennis Gruending
- Succeeded by: Kelly Block

Personal details
- Born: December 12, 1945 (age 80) Biggar, Saskatchewan, Canada
- Party: Conservative
- Spouse: Noel Skelton
- Profession: Nonprofit service coordinator, family services officer

Carol Skelton, PC (born December 12, 1945) is a Canadian politician. She is a member of the Security Intelligence Review Committee which oversees the operation of Canadian Security Intelligence Service. She formerly served as Member of Parliament from 2000 to 2008, and was the Minister of National Revenue from 2006 to 2007.

She was first elected in the 2000 federal election by 68 votes over incumbent Dennis Gruending of the New Democratic Party in the riding of Saskatoon—Rosetown—Biggar, as a member of the Canadian Alliance. She was deputy leader of the Canadian Alliance for six months in 2003 before that party disbanded itself to merge into the new Conservative Party of Canada.

She was re-elected in the 2004 federal election by over 2,000 votes in a rematch against Gruending. She is the former official opposition critic of Family Issues, Children and Youth, Human Resources Development, the Deputy Prime Minister, Social Economy, Western Economic Diversification, Public Health and Social Development, where she was instrumental in developing the party's child care policies.

In 2006, she was re-elected again, defeating NDP candidate Nettie Wiebe by 6.3 percentage points. She was appointed to the federal cabinet on February 6, 2006, by the new prime minister Stephen Harper, making her the first ever female Canadian federal cabinet minister from the province of Saskatchewan. On May 28, 2007, she announced a new Taxpayers' Bill of Rights and the creation of a Taxpayer's Ombudsman at the Canada Revenue Agency.

In January 2007, she lost the portfolio of Minister of Western Economic Diversification when it was transferred to Rona Ambrose in a minor cabinet shuffle. Skelton announced on August 3, 2007, that she would not run in the 2008 election. Her tenure as Revenue minister ended when Prime Minister Harper again shuffled his cabinet on August 14, 2007.
