= Brad Trost =

Canadian politician (born 1974)

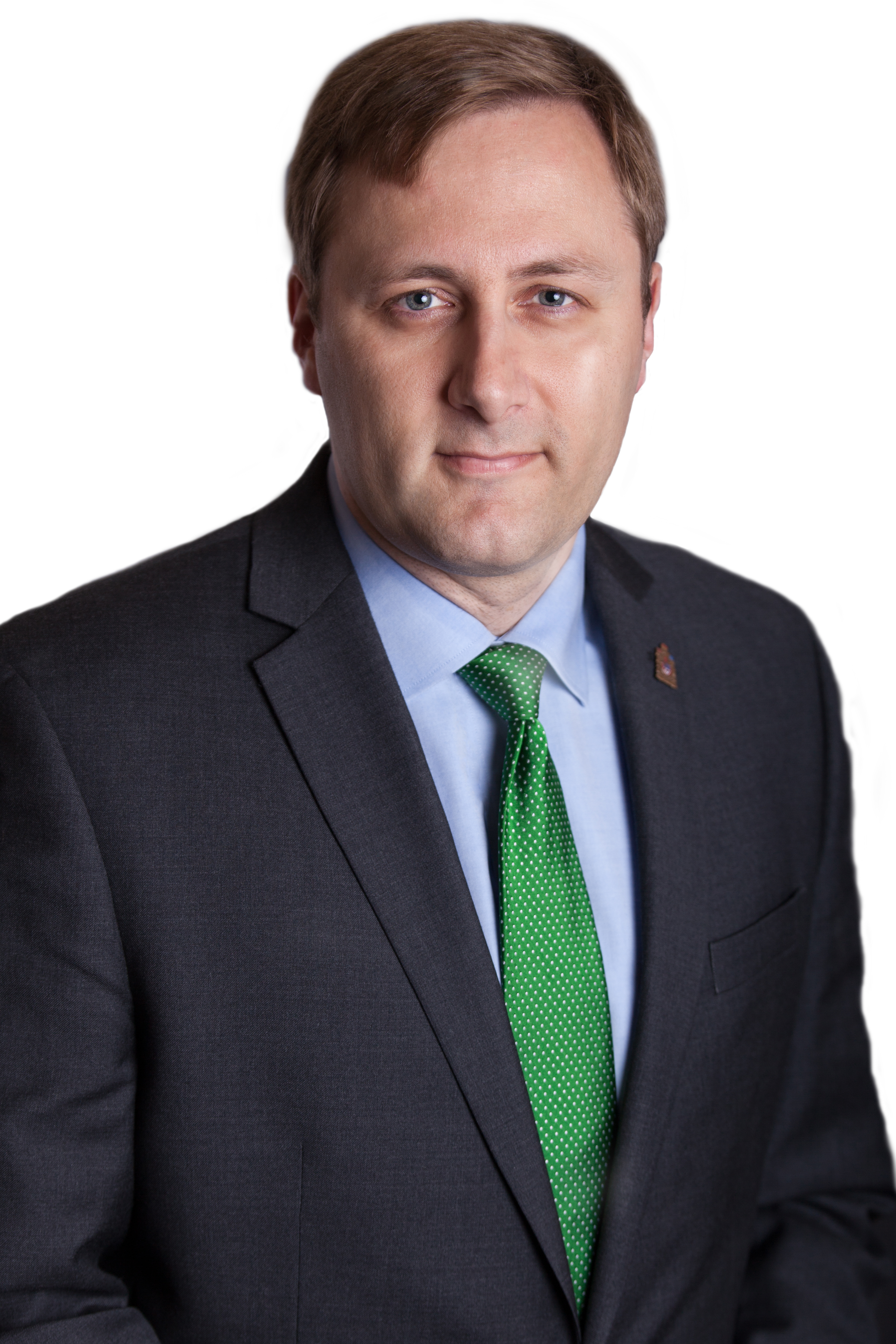

Member of Parliament for Saskatoon—University Saskatoon—Humboldt (2004–2015)
- In office June 28, 2004 – October 21, 2019
- Preceded by: Jim Pankiw
- Succeeded by: Corey Tochor

Personal details
- Born: Bradley Ryan Trost; May 15, 1974 (age 52) Langenburg, Saskatchewan, Canada
- Party: Conservative
- Spouse: Gerelt (m. 2012)
- Education: University of Saskatchewan (BA, BSc)
- Profession: Politician
- Website: Leadership campaign website

Bradley Ryan Trost (born May 15, 1974) is a former Canadian politician who served as a Conservative Member of Parliament in the House of Commons of Canada, representing the ridings of Saskatoon—Humboldt from 2004 to 2015 and Saskatoon—University from 2015 to 2019. He was a candidate in the 2017 Conservative Party of Canada leadership election, finishing fourth. Trost was known for his support of socially conservative positions.

== Early and personal life ==
Before being elected, Trost worked as an exploration and mining geophysicist. Trost holds a Bachelor of Science in geophysics and a Bachelor of Arts in economics, both from the University of Saskatchewan. He married in August 2012.

== Political career ==
In 2004, in what was the closest four-way race in the country, Trost received 417 more votes than second-place candidate, the New Democratic Party's (NDP) Nettie Wiebe, 435 votes ahead of the third place candidate, Liberal Patrick Wolfe, and 2368 votes ahead of the re-offering incumbent MP Jim Pankiw, who had been elected with the Conservative Party’s predecessor the Canadian Alliance but had broken with the party.

Trost was re-elected, in 2006, 2008, and 2011 earning between 49 per cent and 53 per cent of the vote defeating the second-place NDP, and the third-place Liberals in Saskatoon-Humboldt in each election. In the 2015 federal election, Trost was elected in the new urban riding of Saskatoon-University with 41.5 per cent of the vote.

=== Parliament activity ===
In November 2015, Trost was named the Conservative Critic for Canada/U.S. Relations by Interim Leader Rona Ambrose, Leader of the Opposition.

Trost has been an outspoken critic of moves toward a carbon tax, arguing that such a tax kills jobs and blocks job creation. In a series of House of Commons Order Paper Questions, Trost questioned the benefits of a carbon tax and raised concerns as to its effects on Canada's economy.

Brad served as a member of the House of Commons Standing Committee on Natural Resources. He had also served as a member of the International Trade Committee and, before that, the Industry Committee. He is the founder of the Conservative Party's Energy Caucus and was a member of the Parliamentary Pro-Life Caucus. He also served as an elected vice-chair of the Canada-U.S. Parliamentary Association.

In the 40th Parliament, Trost introduced private members legislation into the House of Commons that would open the Canadian uranium mining sector to increased foreign investment.

As a member of the Standing Committee on International Trade, Trost was a supporter of the Canada–Colombia Free Trade Agreement.

=== Conservative leadership run ===
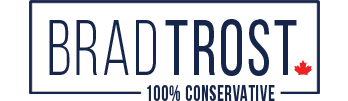
Campaign logo

Trost announced his entry into the 2017 Conservative Party of Canada leadership election in the summer of 2016, saying, "I believe the Conservative Party needs what I'm calling a full spectrum conservative candidate." The Campaign Life Coalition endorsed candidates Trost and Pierre Lemieux in the leadership election. Between August 2016 and May 2017, Trost campaigned to become Leader of the Conservative Party of Canada. He was the third runner-up in a field of thirteen candidates, being eliminated on the tenth ballot after coming in fourth behind frontrunner Maxime Bernier, eventual winner Andrew Scheer, and Erin O'Toole, who would become leader of the party in 2020.

=== After the leadership race ===
After the election, Trost's leadership campaign was fined $50,000 by the Conservative Party for allegedly leaking the party's membership list to the National Firearms Association. On February 11, 2019, the Conservative Party released a statement from its Leadership Election Organizing Committee (LEOC) which concluded: "In short, LEOC does not believe there is evidence that the Trost Campaign was responsible for leaking of the membership list...." The fine was therefore removed from the Brad Trost Campaign. In 2018, Trost lost the renomination as the party candidate for his riding during the 43rd Federal election to Corey Tochor, former speaker of the Saskatchewan Legislature.

== Positions ==
Trost has been noted for publicly taking fiscally and socially conservative stances. In a July 2016 interview, Trost indicated he was opposed to carbon taxes (as well as taxes in general), the legalization of cannabis, and transgender washrooms.

During an unofficial debate in November 2016 between nine Conservative leadership contenders, Trost stated, "I don't believe climate change is a real threat."

In July 2009, Trost criticized his own government's funding of Toronto Pride Week under the $100 million Marquee Tourism Events stimulus program.

In November 2009, Trost launched a petition to stop the federal government's funding of the International Planned Parenthood Federation (IPPF). According to Trost's petition, the IPPF "promotes the establishment of abortion as an international human right and lobbies aggressively to impose permissive abortion laws on developing nations." During the 2011 federal election campaign, Trost made news when he spoke at a Saskatchewan Pro-life Association convention and noted to the audience that the government had not renewed funding to Planned Parenthood over the previous year and urged continued support for their defunding.

In September 2011, Trost publicly voiced his anger at the federal government's decision to fund the International Planned Parenthood Federation. He said that Conservative MPs' requests that the Prime Minister's Office cease funding have been ignored.

In January 2012, Trost criticized the strict party discipline imposed upon Conservative MPs, saying it stifled debate and independent thought.

Trost was one of the few MPs at the 2016 Conservative policy convention who insisted on retaining the party's definition of marriage as "the Union of one man and one woman". On May 4, 2017, Trost sent a private member's bill to the floor to privatize the CBC, Canada's national public broadcaster, and upon its second reading it was defeated 260 to 6, with only himself and five other Conservative members voting for the bill.

== Electoral record ==
2015 Canadian federal election: Saskatoon—University
Party	Candidate	Votes	%	±%	Expenditures
Conservative	Brad Trost	18,592	41.53	-7.07	$62,436.57
New Democratic	Claire Card	14,115	31.53	-6.47	$120,992.80
Liberal	Cynthia Marie Block	11,287	25.21	+15.6	$99,324.30
Green	Valerie Harvey	686	1.53	-1.39	$140.15
Rhinoceros	Eric Matthew Schalm	93	0.21	–	–
Total valid votes/expense limit		44,773	99.71		$193,381.41
Total rejected ballots		130	0.29	–	
Turnout		45,903	76.90	–	
Eligible voters		58,394			
Conservative hold		Swing		-0.30	
Source: Elections Canada

2011 Canadian federal election: Saskatoon—Humboldt
Party	Candidate	Votes	%	±%	Expenditures
Conservative	Brad Trost	19,954	52.7	-1.1	$61,713
New Democratic	Denise Kouri	13,271	35.1	+7.3	$72,371
Liberal	Darren Hill	3,013	8.0	-4.0	$45,694
Green	Sandra Finley	926	2.4	-4.0	$5,443
Independent	Jim Pankiw	682	1.8	–	–
Total valid votes/Expense limit		37,846	100.0		–
Total rejected ballots		106	0.3	+0.1	
Turnout		37,952	67.7	+6.2	
Eligible voters		56,047	–	–	

2008 Canadian federal election: Saskatoon—Humboldt
Party	Candidate	Votes	%	±%	Expenditures
Conservative	Brad Trost	18,610	53.8	+4.7	$57,441
New Democratic	Scott Ruston	9,632	27.8	-1.7	$43,654
Liberal	Karen Parhar	4,135	12.0	-4.9	$27,728
Green	Jean-Pierre Ducasse	2,211	6.4	+2.7	$5,910
Total valid votes/Expense limit		34,588	100.0		$80,987
Total rejected ballots		83	0.2	0.0	
Turnout		34,671	61.5	-5	

2006 Canadian federal election: Saskatoon—Humboldt
Party	Candidate	Votes	%	±%	Expenditures
Conservative	Brad Trost	18,285	49.1	+22.4	$70,424
New Democratic	Andrew Mason	10,975	29.5	+3.9	$51,091
Liberal	Peter Stroh	6,281	16.9	-8.6	$44,850
Green	Mike Jones	1,382	3.7	+1.8	$1,814
Independent	Tim Nyborg	342	0.9	–	$1,160
Total valid votes		37,265	100.0		–
Total rejected ballots		90	0.2	0.0	
Turnout		37,355	67	+4	

2004 Canadian federal election: Saskatoon—Humboldt
Party	Candidate	Votes	%	±%	Expenditures
Conservative	Brad Trost	9,444	26.7	-23.0	$61,922
New Democratic	Nettie Wiebe	9,027	25.6	-0.9	$58,415
Liberal	Patrick Wolfe	9,009	25.5	+3.8	$66,060
Independent	Jim Pankiw	7,076	20.0	–	$73,828
Green	Ron Schriml	680	1.9	+0.6	$25
Independent	Larry Zarysky	71	0.2	–	$2,594
Total valid votes		35,307	100.0		–
Total rejected ballots		66	0.2	0.0	
Turnout		35,373	63	-1	
