= Saskatoon East =

Federal electoral district in Saskatchewan, Canada

Saskatchewan electoral district
- Interactive map of riding boundaries from the 2025 federal election

Federal electoral district
- Legislature: House of Commons
MP
Corey Tochor
Conservative
- District created: 2013
- First contested: 2015
- Last contested: 2025
- District webpage: profile, map

Demographics
- Population (2011): 76,257
- Electors (2011): 55,219
- Area (km²): 71
- Pop. density (per km²): 1,074
- Census division: Division No. 11
- Census subdivision: Saskatoon (part)

Saskatoon East (former Saskatoon—University) is a federal electoral district in Saskatchewan.

== Demographics ==
Panethnic groups in Saskatoon—University (2011−2021)
Panethnic group	2021		2016		2011	
Panethnic group	Pop.	%	Pop.	%	Pop.	%
European (Note: Statistic includes all persons that did not make up part of a visible minority or an indigenous identity.)	59,250	68.29%	60,290	74.05%	62,020	82.76%
Indigenous	7,540	8.69%	6,150	7.55%	4,075	5.44%
South Asian	6,520	7.51%	4,560	5.6%	2,545	3.4%
East Asian (Note: Statistic includes total responses of "Chinese", "Korean", and "Japanese" under visible minority section on census.)	3,980	4.59%	3,500	4.3%	2,095	2.8%
Southeast Asian (Note: Statistic includes total responses of "Filipino" and "Southeast Asian" under visible minority section on census.)	3,645	4.2%	2,895	3.56%	2,110	2.82%
African	2,575	2.97%	1,660	2.04%	710	0.95%
Middle Eastern (Note: Statistic includes total responses of "West Asian" and "Arab" under visible minority section on census.)	1,890	2.18%	1,350	1.66%	975	1.3%
Latin American	740	0.85%	535	0.66%	195	0.26%
Other/multiracial (Note: Statistic includes total responses of "Visible minority, n.i.e." and "Multiple visible minorities" under visible minority section on census.)	645	0.74%	480	0.59%	210	0.28%
Total responses	86,765	98.21%	81,420	98.5%	74,940	98.27%
Total population	88,348	100%	82,663	100%	76,257	100%
Notes: Totals greater than 100% due to multiple origin responses. Demographics based on 2012 Canadian federal electoral redistribution riding boundaries.

== History ==
Saskatoon East was first represented in the House of Commons of Canada from 1979 to 1988. It was created in 1976 from parts of Saskatoon—Humboldt riding. It was abolished in 1987 when it was redistributed into Saskatoon—Dundurn and Saskatoon—Humboldt ridings.

Saskatoon—University was created by the 2012 federal electoral boundaries redistribution out of parts of Saskatoon—Humboldt and Saskatoon—Wanuskewin, and was legally defined in the 2013 representation order. It came into effect upon the call of the 2015 Canadian federal election, held on October 19, 2015.

In the 2021 Canadian federal election, Corey Tochor of the Conservative Party was re-elected to a second term in office.

The riding's name was changed to Saskatoon East (French: Saskatoon-Est) as part of Bill C-25 of the 45th Canadian Parliament.

=== Members of Parliament ===
This riding has elected the following members of Parliament:

Parliament	Years	Member	Party
Saskatoon East; Riding created from Saskatoon—Humboldt
31st	1979–1980	Robert Ogle	New Democratic
32nd	1980–1984	Robert Ogle	New Democratic
33rd	1984–1988	Don Ravis	Progressive Conservative
Riding dissolved into Saskatoon—Humboldt and Saskatoon—Dundurn
Saskatoon—University; Riding created from Saskatoon—Humboldt and Saskatoon—Wanuskewin
42nd	2015–2019	Brad Trost	Conservative
43rd	2019–2021	Corey Tochor	Conservative
44th	2021–2025	Corey Tochor	Conservative
45th	2025–present	Corey Tochor	Conservative
Saskatoon East

== Election results ==
Graph of election results in Saskatoon—University (minor parties that never got 2% of the vote or didn't run consistently are omitted)

=== 2023 representation order ===
2025 Canadian federal election: Saskatoon—University
** Preliminary results — Not yet official **
Party	Candidate	Votes	%	±%	Expenditures
Conservative	Corey Tochor	23,178	48.87	+0.95	
Liberal	Greg Poelzer	19,622	41.37	+30.51	
New Democratic	Melissa McGillivray	4,035	8.51	–26.89	
People's	Jaxson Boot	327	0.69	–3.49	
Green	Isaiah Hunter	263	0.55	–0.40	
Total valid votes/expense limit					
Total rejected ballots					
Turnout		47,425	72.35		
Eligible voters		65,548			
Conservative notional hold		Swing		–14.78	
Source: Elections Canada

2021 federal election redistributed results
Party	Vote	%
Conservative	20,447	47.92
New Democratic	15,102	35.40
Liberal	4,632	10.86
People's	1,785	4.18
Green	406	0.95
Others	295	0.69

=== 2013 representation order ===
2021 Canadian federal election: Saskatoon—University
Party	Candidate	Votes	%	±%	Expenditures
Conservative	Corey Tochor	20,389	48.0	-4.13	$49,119.86
New Democratic	Claire Card	15,042	35.4	+5.64	$64,131.11
Liberal	Dawn Dumont Walker	4,608	10.8	-2.27	$28,794.80
People's	Guto Penteado	1,778	4.2	+2.78	$7,791.19
Green	North-Marie Hunter	405	1.0	-1.98	$200.47
Christian Heritage	Carl A. Wesolowski	195	0.5	-0.15	$4,979.31
Communist	Jeremy Fisher	100	0.2	–	$0.00
Total valid votes/expense limit		42,517	99.31	–	$103,229.52
Total rejected ballots		294	0.69	+0.12	
Turnout		42,811	69.17	-7.1	
Eligible voters		61,894			
Conservative hold		Swing		-4.89	
Source: Elections Canada

2019 Canadian federal election: Saskatoon—University
Party	Candidate	Votes	%	±%	Expenditures
Conservative	Corey Tochor	24,514	52.13	+10.60	$53,397.85
New Democratic	Claire Card	13,994	29.76	-1.77	$48,544.63
Liberal	Susan Hayton	6,146	13.07	-12.14	$48,086.76
Green	Jan Norris	1,401	2.98	+1.45	$2,596.44
People's	Guto Penteado	667	1.42	-	$8,671.07
Christian Heritage	Jeff Willerton	305	0.65	-	$11,862.47
Total valid votes/expense limit		47,027	99.43		
Total rejected ballots		271	0.57	+0.28	
Turnout		47,298	76.27	-0.62	
Eligible voters		62,012			
Conservative hold		Swing		+6.19	
Source: Elections Canada

2015 Canadian federal election: Saskatoon—University
Party	Candidate	Votes	%	±%	Expenditures
Conservative	Brad Trost	18,592	41.53	-7.07	$62,436.57
New Democratic	Claire Card	14,115	31.53	-6.47	$120,992.80
Liberal	Cynthia Marie Block	11,287	25.21	+15.6	$99,324.30
Green	Valerie Harvey	686	1.53	-1.39	$140.15
Rhinoceros	Eric Matthew Schalm	93	0.21	–	–
Total valid votes/expense limit		44,773	99.71		$193,381.41
Total rejected ballots		130	0.29	–	
Turnout		45,903	76.90	–	
Eligible voters		58,394			
Conservative hold		Swing		-0.30	
Source: Elections Canada

2011 federal election redistributed results
Party	Vote	%
Conservative	17,067	48.60
New Democratic	13,344	38.00
Liberal	3,374	9.61
Green	1,026	2.92
Independent	309	0.88

=== 1976 representation order ===
1984 Canadian federal election
Party	Candidate	Votes
Progressive Conservative	RAVIS, Don	17,087
New Democratic	CLAY, Colin	16,670
Liberal	RICHARDSON, Doug	11,901
Rhinoceros	ARSCOTT, Hugh	340
Green	ROGALA, Roy	164
Confederation of Regions	NEEFS, Germaine	123

1980 Canadian federal election
Party	Candidate	Votes
New Democratic	OGLE, Bob	12,985
Progressive Conservative	MEYERS, Dan	12,373
Liberal	RICHARDSON, Doug	11,483
Not affiliated	ARSCOTT, Hugh	728
Marxist–Leninist	NEUFELD, Eric	63

1979 Canadian federal election
Party	Candidate	Votes
New Democratic	OGLE, Bob	15,234
Progressive Conservative	MEYERS, Dan	13,256
Liberal	LANG, Otto	12,631
Social Credit	HOLTORF, Gary	117
Marxist–Leninist	NEUFELD, Eric	64

== See also ==
- List of Canadian electoral districts
- Historical federal electoral districts of Canada
