= Kelly Block =

Canadian politician

Kelly Block MP
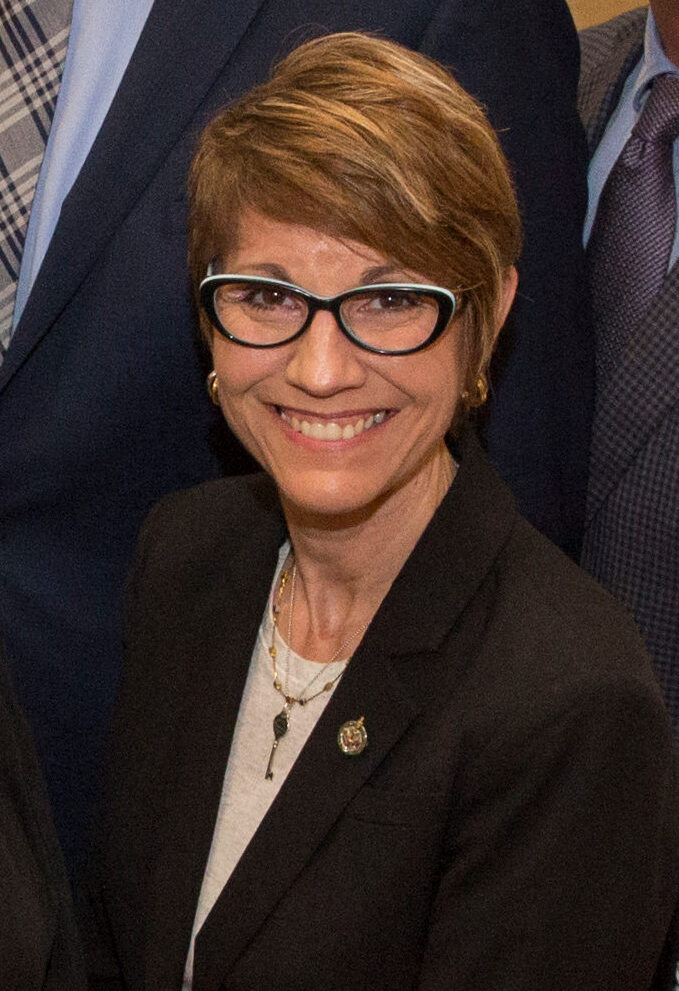

Member of Parliament for Carlton Trail—Eagle Creek Saskatoon—Rosetown—Biggar (2008-2015)
- Incumbent
- Assumed office October 14, 2008
- Preceded by: Carol Skelton

Mayor of Waldheim
- In office October 2003 – 2008

Municipal Councilor for Waldheim
- In office 2000–2003

Personal details
- Born: November 30, 1961 (age 64) Saskatoon, Saskatchewan, Canada
- Party: Conservative

Kelly Block MP (born November 30, 1961) is a Canadian politician representing the electoral district of Carlton Trail—Eagle Creek since 2015. She was first elected in the 2008 Canadian federal election to serve as the Member of Parliament for the Saskatoon—Rosetown—Biggar district. Prior to her election to the House of Commons, Block served two terms as mayor of Waldheim, Saskatchewan. Block was Waldheim's first female mayor, and also served as chairperson of the Gabriel Springs Health District. Block was later appointed to the Saskatoon Regional Health Authority when the government of Saskatchewan amalgamated its health districts. Block ran unsuccessfully for the Saskatchewan Party nomination for the provincial Martensville constituency by-election in November 2006 against Nancy Heppner.

== Career ==
Block is a member of the Conservative Party. She was appointed to the Procedure and House Affairs Committee (PROC) and the Access to Information, Privacy and Ethics Committee (ETHI). In fall 2009, Block was moved from PROC and appointed to the budget and finance committee. With the commencement of the 41st Parliament in 2011, Block was appointed to the health committee, and the government operations and estimates committee. Block was also appointed by Prime Minister Stephen Harper to serve as the regional caucus chairperson for the Saskatchewan Conservative caucus.

Block was awarded the Maclean's Parliamentarian of the Year – Rising Star – Award in June 2010 after receiving the highest number of weighted votes from fellow parliamentarians of all parties.

In October 2012, Block sent out a flyer to her constituents entitled Ending Unfair Benefits for Refugee Claimants which criticized refugee claimants and rejected refugee applicants access to extended healthcare benefits. She was criticized in the media and Parliament for the newsletter. Block defended the message but said the content was a draft, and expressed regret about some of the language used.

Following the 2013 redrawing of Saskatchewan's federal electoral boundaries, Block stated she would run in the new riding of Humboldt-Warman-Martensville-Rosetown (later renamed Carlton Trail-Eagle Creek).

In September 2013, Block was appointed Parliamentary Secretary for the Ministry of Natural Resources.

In the 2015 federal election, won by the Liberal Party, Block was elected in the redrawn riding of Carlton Trail—Eagle Creek. She was appointed as the Conservative critic for Transport by interim leader Rona Ambrose.

In 2019, Block was re-elected with an increased margin and the fourth-highest voter turnout in the election. She was appointed as the Opposition critic for Public Services and Procurement Canada by Conservative Leader Andrew Scheer.

Block was elected Chair of the Standing Committee on Public Accounts On October 15, 2020.

In February 2021, Kelly Block introduced the Protection of Freedom of Conscience Act.

At the time of the 2025 Canadian federal election, she lived in Warman, Saskatchewan.

== Electoral record ==
2025 Canadian federal election: Carlton Trail—Eagle Creek
Party	Candidate	Votes	%	±%	Expenditures
Conservative	Kelly Block	36,427	77.4%		
New Democratic	Cheryl Loadman	2,616	5.6%		
Liberal	Katelyn Zimmer	8,008	17.0%		
Total valid votes/expense limit					
Total rejected ballots		312			
Turnout		47,363			
Eligible voters		62,947			
Source: Elections Canada

2021 Canadian federal election: Carlton Trail—Eagle Creek
Party	Candidate	Votes	%	±%	Expenditures
Conservative	Kelly Block	28,192	68.6	-9.96	$80,986.88
New Democratic	Shannon O'Toole	5,608	13.6	+1.29	$64.04
People's	Mike Bohach	3,791	9.2	+7.42	none listed
Liberal	Harrison Andruschak	2,066	5.0	+0.36	$2,023.58
Maverick	Diane Pastoor	1,053	2.6	–	$16,312.07
Green	Cherese Reemaul	379	0.9	-1.04	$229.40
Total valid votes/expense limit		41,089	100.0	–	$115,365.17
Total rejected ballots		189			
Turnout		41,278	70.3		
Eligible voters		58,737			
Conservative hold		Swing		-5.63	
Source: Elections Canada

2019 Canadian federal election: Carlton Trail—Eagle Creek
Party	Candidate	Votes	%	±%	Expenditures
Conservative	Kelly Block	35,313	78.56	13.84	$111,554.48
New Democratic	Jasmine Calix	5,535	12.31	-6.35	none listed
Liberal	Rebecca Malo	2,085	4.64	-9.73	none listed
Green	Dean Gibson	873	1.94	-0.3	$0.00
People's	Cody Payant	799	1.78	–	none listed
Independent	Glenn Wright	344	0.76	–	$56.96
Total valid votes/expense limit		44,949	100.0		
Total rejected ballots		240			
Turnout		45,189	78.5		
Eligible voters		57,601			
Conservative hold		Swing		+20.19	
Source: Elections Canada

2015 Canadian federal election: Carlton Trail—Eagle Creek
Party	Candidate	Votes	%	±%	Expenditures
Conservative	Kelly Block	26,004	64.72	-3.62	$102,769.56
New Democratic	Glenn Wright	7,499	18.66	-5.75	$36,765.92
Liberal	Alexander Slusar	5,774	14.37	+10.45	$4,877.96
Green	Lynn Wesley Oliphant	902	2.24	-0.36	–
Total valid votes/expense limit		40,179	100.0		$217,926.51
Total rejected ballots		109	0.19	–	
Turnout		40,288	73.18	–	
Eligible voters		55,048			
Source: Elections Canada

2011 Canadian federal election: Saskatoon—Rosetown—Biggar
Party	Candidate	Votes	%	±%	Expenditures
Conservative	Kelly Block	14,652	48.70	+3.31	
New Democratic	Nettie Wiebe	14,114	46.91	+2.49	
Liberal	Lee Reaney	697	2.32	-2.09	
Green	Vicki Strelioff	626	2.08	-2.49	
Total valid votes/Expense limit		30,089	100.00		
Total rejected ballots		131	0.43		
Turnout		30,220	62.29		
Conservative hold		Swing		+0.82	

2008 Canadian federal election: Saskatoon—Rosetown—Biggar
Party	Candidate	Votes	%	±%	Expenditures
Conservative	Kelly Block	12,166	45.4	-0.2	$78,169
New Democratic	Nettie Wiebe	11,913	44.5	+5.5	$63,284
Green	Amber Jones	1,228	4.6	+2.1	$8,174
Liberal	Roy Bluehorn	1,176	4.4	-7.7	$10,785
Independent	Rick Barsky	134	0.5	+0.5	N/A
Christian Heritage	Marcel Bourassa	111	0.4	-0.5	$50
Libertarian	Kevin Stricker	74	0.3	+0.3	$1,339
Total valid votes/Expense limit		26,802	100.0	$78,625	
Conservative hold		Swing		-2.85	
