= Carlton Trail—Eagle Creek =

Federal electoral district in Saskatchewan, Canada

Saskatchewan electoral district
- Interactive map of riding boundaries from the 2025 federal election

Federal electoral district
- Legislature: House of Commons
MP
Kelly Block
Conservative
- District created: 2013
- First contested: 2015
- Last contested: 2025
- District webpage: profile, map

Demographics
- Population (2011): 72,607
- Electors (2011): 53,836
- Area (km²): 29,040
- Pop. density (per km²): 2.5
- Census division(s): Division No. 11, Division No. 12, Division No. 15
- Census subdivision(s): Warman, Martensville, Corman Park, Humboldt, Vanscoy, Rosthern, Blucher, Dalmeny, Rosthern, Langham

Carlton Trail—Eagle Creek (French: Sentier Carlton—Eagle Creek) is a federal electoral district in Saskatchewan. It encompasses a portion of Saskatchewan formerly included in the electoral districts of Saskatoon—Humboldt, Saskatoon—Rosetown—Biggar, and Saskatoon—Wanuskewin.

Carlton Trail—Eagle Creek was created by the 2012 federal electoral boundaries redistribution and was legally defined in the 2013 representation order. It came into effect upon the call of the 42nd Canadian federal election, scheduled for 19 October 2015.

The riding was originally intended to be named Humboldt—Warman—Martensville—Rosetown.

== Demographics ==
Panethnic groups in Carlton Trail—Eagle Creek (2011−2021)
Panethnic group	2021		2016		2011	
Panethnic group	Pop.	%	Pop.	%	Pop.	%
European (Note: Statistic includes all persons that did not make up part of a visible minority or an indigenous identity.)	67,705	84.33%	68,080	87.37%	62,900	89.05%
Indigenous	8,730	10.87%	7,310	9.38%	6,190	8.76%
Southeast Asian (Note: Statistic includes total responses of "Filipino" and "Southeast Asian" under visible minority section on census.)	1,960	2.44%	1,225	1.57%	545	0.77%
South Asian	610	0.76%	395	0.51%	150	0.21%
African	495	0.62%	325	0.42%	135	0.19%
East Asian (Note: Statistic includes total responses of "Chinese", "Korean", and "Japanese" under visible minority section on census.)	365	0.45%	240	0.31%	320	0.45%
Latin American	265	0.33%	250	0.32%	190	0.27%
Middle Eastern (Note: Statistic includes total responses of "West Asian" and "Arab" under visible minority section on census.)	45	0.06%	35	0.04%	35	0.05%
Other/multiracial (Note: Statistic includes total responses of "Visible minority, n.i.e." and "Multiple visible minorities" under visible minority section on census.)	105	0.13%	80	0.1%	170	0.24%
Total responses	80,285	96.27%	77,925	96.61%	70,635	97.28%
Total population	83,395	100%	80,662	100%	72,607	100%
Notes: Totals greater than 100% due to multiple origin responses. Demographics based on 2012 Canadian federal electoral redistribution riding boundaries.

== Members of Parliament ==
This riding has elected the following members of Parliament:

Parliament	Years	Member	Party
Carlton Trail—Eagle Creek; Riding created from Saskatoon—Humboldt, Saskatoon—Rosetown—Biggar and Saskatoon—Wanuskewin
42nd	2015–2019	Kelly Block	Conservative
43rd	2019–2021	Kelly Block	Conservative
44th	2021–2025	Kelly Block	Conservative
45th	2025–present	Kelly Block	Conservative

== Election results ==
View source data.
Graph of election results in Carlton Trail—Eagle Creek (minor parties that never got 2% of the vote or didn't run consistently are omitted)

=== 2023 representation order ===
2025 Canadian federal election
Party	Candidate	Votes	%	±%	Expenditures
Conservative	Kelly Block	36,427	77.4%		
New Democratic	Cheryl Loadman	2,616	5.6%		
Liberal	Katelyn Zimmer	8,008	17.0%		
Total valid votes/expense limit					
Total rejected ballots		312			
Turnout		47,363			
Eligible voters		62,947			
Source: Elections Canada

2021 federal election redistributed results
Party	Vote	%
Conservative	28,450	68.00
New Democratic	5,872	14.04
People's	3,876	9.26
Liberal	2,289	5.47
Green	389	0.93
Others	960	2.29

=== 2013 representation order ===
2021 Canadian federal election
Party	Candidate	Votes	%	±%	Expenditures
Conservative	Kelly Block	28,192	68.6	-9.96	$80,986.88
New Democratic	Shannon O'Toole	5,608	13.6	+1.29	$64.04
People's	Mike Bohach	3,791	9.2	+7.42	none listed
Liberal	Harrison Andruschak	2,066	5.0	+0.36	$2,023.58
Maverick	Diane Pastoor	1,053	2.6	–	$16,312.07
Green	Cherese Reemaul	379	0.9	-1.04	$229.40
Total valid votes/expense limit		41,089	100.0	–	$115,365.17
Total rejected ballots		189			
Turnout		41,278	70.3		
Eligible voters		58,737			
Conservative hold		Swing		-5.63	
Source: Elections Canada

2019 Canadian federal election
Party	Candidate	Votes	%	±%	Expenditures
Conservative	Kelly Block	35,313	78.56	13.84	$111,554.48
New Democratic	Jasmine Calix	5,535	12.31	-6.35	none listed
Liberal	Rebecca Malo	2,085	4.64	-9.73	none listed
Green	Dean Gibson	873	1.94	-0.3	$0.00
People's	Cody Payant	799	1.78	–	none listed
Independent	Glenn Wright	344	0.76	–	$56.96
Total valid votes/expense limit		44,949	100.0		
Total rejected ballots		240			
Turnout		45,189	78.5		
Eligible voters		57,601			
Conservative hold		Swing		+20.19	
Source: Elections Canada

2015 Canadian federal election
Party	Candidate	Votes	%	±%	Expenditures
Conservative	Kelly Block	26,004	64.72	-3.62	$102,769.56
New Democratic	Glenn Wright	7,499	18.66	-5.75	$36,765.92
Liberal	Alexander Slusar	5,774	14.37	+10.45	$4,877.96
Green	Lynn Wesley Oliphant	902	2.24	-0.36	–
Total valid votes/expense limit		40,179	100.0		$217,926.51
Total rejected ballots		109	0.19	–	
Turnout		40,288	73.18	–	
Eligible voters		55,048			
Source: Elections Canada

2011 federal election redistributed results
Party	Vote	%
Conservative	22,306	68.34
New Democratic	7,966	24.41
Liberal	1,278	3.92
Green	854	2.62
Independent	235	0.72

== See also ==
- List of Canadian electoral districts
- Historical federal electoral districts of Canada
