= Stan Hovdebo =

Canadian politician

Stanley J. Hovdebo

Member of Parliament for Saskatoon—Humboldt (Prince Albert; 1979–1988)
- In office 19 November 1979 – 25 October 1993
- Preceded by: John Diefenbaker
- Succeeded by: Georgette Sheridan

Personal details
- Born: 20 August 1925 Domremy, Saskatchewan Canada
- Died: 14 January 2018 (aged 92) Northern Light, Saskatchewan Canada
- Party: NDP
- Profession: Educator

Stanley John Hovdebo (20 August 1925 – 14 January 2018) was a New Democratic Party member of the House of Commons of Canada. He was an educator by career.

He first campaigned in the Saskatchewan riding of Prince Albert during the 1979 federal election, where he lost to former Prime Minister John Diefenbaker, the longtime Progressive Conservative Member of Parliament. Diefenbaker died in office that 16 August, however, triggering a by-election on 19 November 1979. Hovdebo ran again for the NDP and this time became the MP for Prince Albert.

Hovdebo won re-election at Prince Albert in the 1980 and 1984 federal elections. Prince Albert was abolished ahead of 1988 federal election. Hovdebo transferred to Saskatoon—Humboldt riding and returned to Parliament for a third full term before retiring in 1993.

Hovdebo served in the last weeks of the 31st Canadian Parliament and for full terms in the 32nd, 33rd, and 34th Canadian Parliaments. He died on 14 January 2018 at the age of 92.

== Electoral record ==
1984 Canadian federal election: Prince Albert
Party	Candidate	Votes	%	±%
New Democratic	Stan Hovdebo	13,359	35.6	+0.8
Progressive Conservative	Gordon Dobrowolsky	13,062	34.8	+2.3
Liberal	J.H. Clyne Harradence	10,886	29.0	-3.8
Confederation of Regions	Tony Panas	262	0.7	
Total valid votes		37,569	100.0	

1980 Canadian federal election: Prince Albert
Party	Candidate	Votes	%	±%
New Democratic	Stan Hovdebo	11,601	34.8	-3.2
Liberal	J.H. Clyne Harradence	10,919	32.8	+7.3
Progressive Conservative	Kris Eggum	10,819	32.5	-3.6
Total valid votes		33,339	100.0	
lop.parl.ca

Canadian federal by-election, 19 November 1979
Party	Candidate	Votes	%	±%
On Mr. Diefenbaker's death, 16 August 1979
New Democratic	Stan Hovdebo	10,941	38.0	+2.3
Progressive Conservative	Kris Eggum	10,385	36.0	-12.9
Liberal	J.H. Clyne Harradence	7,336	25.5	+10.1
Independent	John L. De Bruyne	147	0.5	
Total valid votes		28,809	100.0	

1979 Canadian federal election: Prince Albert
Party	Candidate	Votes	%	±%
Progressive Conservative	John Diefenbaker	16,438	49.0	-10.2
New Democratic	Stan Hovdebo	11,979	35.7	+14.1
Liberal	Peter Abrametz	5,158	15.4	-2.7
Total valid votes		33,575	100.0	
