= Nettie Wiebe =

Canadian professor (born 1949)

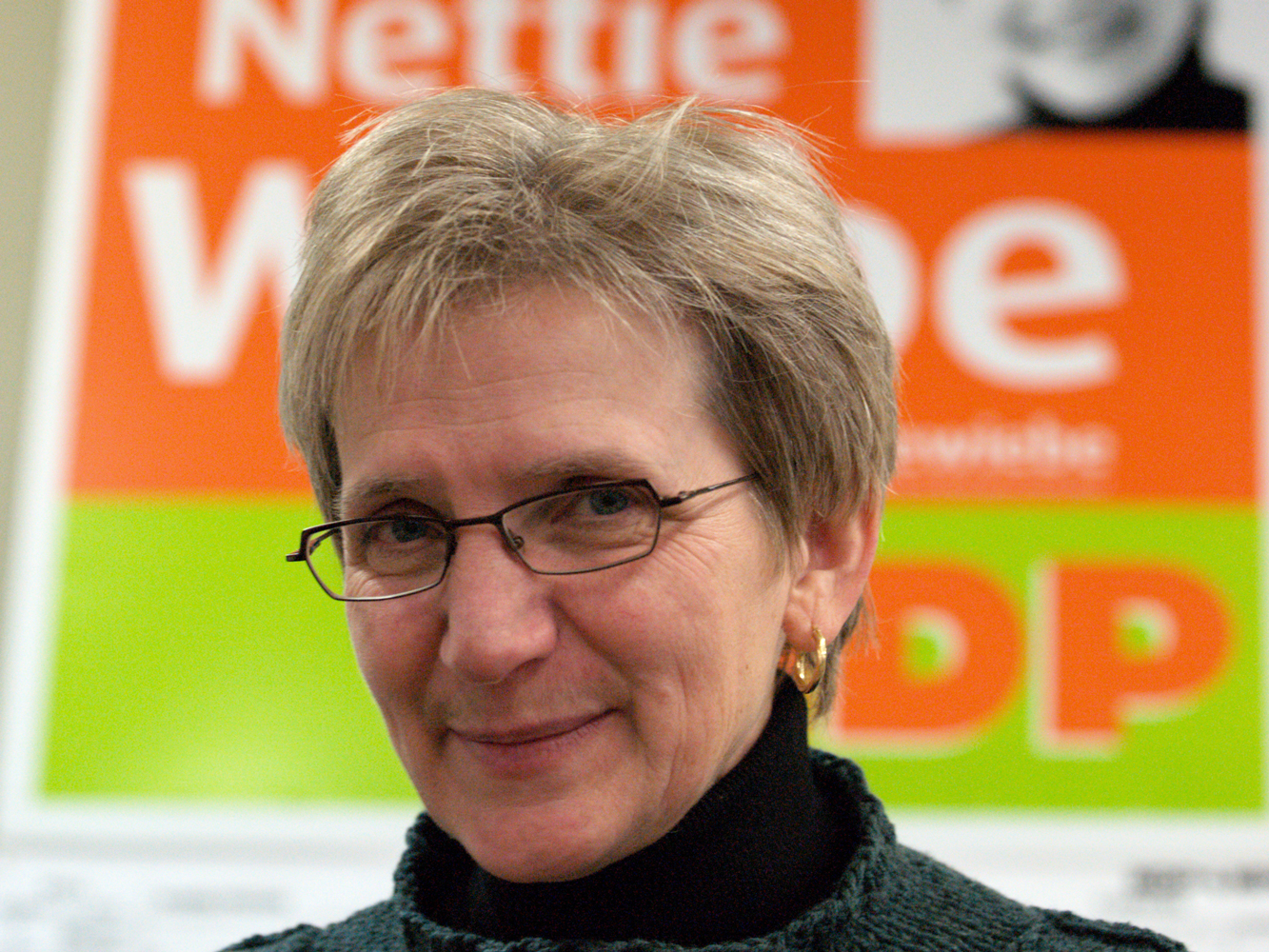
- Nettie Wiebe, during her 2006 federal election campaign

President of the National Farmers Union
- In office 1995–1998

Personal details
- Born: January 22, 1949 (age 77)
- Party: New Democratic Party
- Education: University of Calgary; University of Saskatchewan

Nettie Wiebe (born January 22, 1949) is a Canadian professor. She grew up near Warman, Saskatchewan. She has a BA and MA in Philosophy from the University of Saskatchewan and a PhD in Philosophy from the University of Calgary.

Wiebe first became widely known as the Women's President from 1988–1994 and the president and CEO from 1995-1998 of the National Farmers Union. During her term she vocally defended the role of the Canadian Wheat Board in the marketing of prairie grains.

== Politics ==
In 2001, Wiebe sought the leadership of the Saskatchewan New Democratic Party (and by implication, the office of Premier of Saskatchewan, as the party was in government at the time), following the retirement of then premier and party leader Roy Romanow. For the first time in Saskatchewan, the NDP utilized One Member One Vote as its means of selecting a leader rather than a delegated leadership convention. Wiebe ran on the most explicitly left-wing platform of the major contenders, and placed third behind Chris Axworthy and the eventual winner, Lorne Calvert.

Wiebe chose not to run for a seat in the Legislative Assembly of Saskatchewan in the subsequent 2003 provincial election. However, she did run, unsuccessfully, as the federal New Democratic Party candidate in the 2004 federal election in the riding of Saskatoon—Humboldt, against Conservative candidate Brad Trost, Liberal candidate Patrick Wolfe, and incumbent independent Jim Pankiw. In what was the closest four-way race in the country, Wiebe placed second, with only 417 fewer votes than the winner, Brad Trost, and only 18 more votes than Wolfe (the third place candidate).

In the 2006 Canadian federal election, Wiebe ran as the NDP candidate in the riding of Saskatoon—Rosetown—Biggar, but lost to incumbent Conservative Carol Skelton.

Wiebe is currently a professor of church and society at St. Andrew's College in Saskatoon, Saskatchewan. She was once again the NDP candidate in Saskatoon—Rosetown—Biggar in the 2008 federal election, but Conservative candidate Kelly Block defeated her by just 262 votes (0.98%), Wiebe's narrowest loss to date. She was considered a potential candidate for the 2009 Saskatchewan NDP leadership convention, following Calvert's resignation on October 17, 2008. Wiebe later announced she would not run for the provincial leadership and instead focus on federal politics. Wiebe was re-nominated as the NDP candidate for Saskatoon—Rosetown—Biggar for the 2011 federal election. Block once again defeated Wiebe, this time prevailing by 538 votes. Notably, both women increased their percentage of popular support at the expense of the Liberals and Greens.

In 2026, Wiebe endorsed Avi Lewis in that year's federal NDP leadership race.

== Electoral record ==
Saskatoon—Rosetown—Biggar - 2011 Canadian federal election
Party	Candidate	Votes	%	±%
Conservative	Kelly Block	14,652	48.70%	+3.31%
New Democratic	Nettie Wiebe	14,114	46.91%	+2.49%
Liberal	Lee Reaney	697	2.32%	-2.09%
Green	Vicki Strelioff	626	2.08%	-2.49%
Total valid votes/Expense limit		30,089	100.00%	
Total rejected ballots		131	0.43%	
Turnout		30,220	62.29%	

Saskatoon—Rosetown—Biggar - 2008 Canadian federal election
Party	Candidate	Votes	%	±%	
Conservative	Kelly Block	12,231	45.39%	-0.15%	$78,169
New Democratic	Nettie Wiebe	11,969	44.41%	+5.47%	$63,284
Green	Amber Jones	1,232	4.57%	+2.06%	$8,194
Liberal	Roy Bluehorn	1,188	4.40%	-7.69%	$10,785
Independent	Rick Barsky	138	0.51%	+0.5%	
Christian Heritage	Marcel Bourassa	115	0.42%	-0.47%	$50
Libertarian	Kevin Stricker	73	0.27%	+0.28%	$1,339
Total valid votes/Expense limit		26,946	100%	$78,625	
Total rejected ballots		87	0.18%		
Turnout		27,303	54.8%		

Source: Elections Canada - Official Voting Results

Saskatoon—Rosetown—Biggar - 2006 Canadian federal election
Party	Candidate	Votes	%	±%	
Conservative	Carol Skelton	13,331	45.54%	+0.71%	$58,211
New Democratic	Nettie Wiebe	11,412	38.98%	+2.75%	$62,156
Liberal	Myron Luczka	3,536	12.08%	-3.66%	$2,869
Green	Rick Barsky	738	2.52%	-0.65%	$1,068
Christian Heritage	Marcel Bourassa	258	0.88%	–	$4,463
Total valid votes		29,275	100.00%		
Total rejected ballots		78	0.27%		
Turnout		29,353	60.66%		

Saskatoon—Humboldt - 2004 Canadian federal election
Party	Candidate	Votes	%	±%	
Conservative	Brad Trost	9,444	26.74%	–	$61,922
New Democratic	Nettie Wiebe	9,027	25.56%	–	$58,415
Liberal	Patrick Wolfe	9,009	25.51%	–	$66,060
Independent	Jim Pankiw	7,076	20.04%	–	$73,828
Green	Ron Schriml	680	1.92%	–	$25
Independent	Larry Zarysky	71	0.20%	–	$2,594
Total valid votes		35,307	100.00%		
Total rejected ballots		66	0.19%		
Turnout		35,373	62.97%		

=== 2001 Saskatchewan New Democratic Party leadership election ===
First Ballot
Candidate	Votes	Percentage
Lorne Calvert	6,542	33.66
Chris Axworthy	5,344	27.50
Nettie Wiebe	3,487	17.94
Maynard Sonntag	1,459	7.51
Scott Banda	1,269	6.53
Joanne Crofford	669	3.44
Buckley Belanger	665	3.42
Total	19,435	100.00

(Crofford and Belanger eliminated at under 5%)

Second Ballot
Candidate	Weighted Votes	Percentage	+/-
Lorne Calvert	6,877	35.65	+1.99
Chris Axworthy	5,646	29.26	+1.76
Nettie Wiebe	3,749	19.43	+1.49
Maynard Sonntag	1,712	8.87	+1.36
Scott Banda	1,309	6.78	+0.25
Total	19,293	100.00	

(Banda eliminated, Sonntag withdraws)

Third Ballot
Candidate	Weighted Votes	Percentage	+/-
Lorne Calvert	7,831	41.80	+6.15
Chris Axworthy	6,686	35.69	+6.43
Nettie Wiebe	4,216	22.51	+3.08
Total	18,733	100.00	

(Wiebe eliminated)
