= Saskatoon—Rosetown—Biggar =

Former federal electoral district in Saskatchewan, Canada

Saskatchewan electoral district
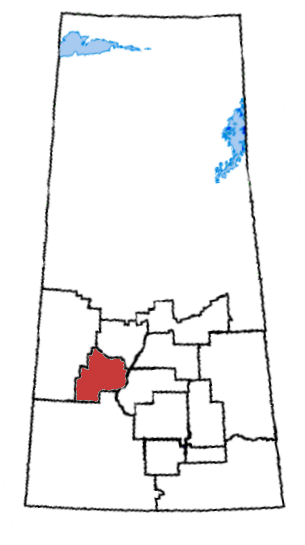
- Saskatoon—Rosetown—Biggar in relation to other Saskatchewan federal electoral districts

Defunct federal electoral district
- Legislature: House of Commons
- District created: 1996
- District abolished: 2013
- First contested: 1997
- Last contested: 2011
- District webpage: profile, map

Demographics
- Population (2011): 72,893
- Electors (2011): 49,314
- Area (km²): 10,935.79
- Census subdivision(s): Saskatoon, Corman Park No. 344, Vanscoy No. 345, Rosetown, Biggar

Saskatoon—Rosetown—Biggar (formerly known as Saskatoon—Rosetown) was a federal electoral district in Saskatchewan, Canada, that was represented in the House of Commons of Canada from 1997 to 2015.

== Geography ==
The district consisted of the southwestern quadrant of Saskatoon and the surrounding southwestern rural area which included the towns of Biggar, Rosetown, and Delisle.

== History ==
It was created in 1996 as "Saskatoon—Rosetown" from Kindersley—Lloydminster, Saskatoon—Clark's Crossing, Saskatoon—Dundurn, and The Battlefords—Meadow Lake ridings.

In 1997, it was renamed "Saskatoon—Rosetown—Biggar".

This riding was the closest in Saskatchewan in 2008, when it was decided by fewer than 300 votes. The major parties nominated the same candidates in 2011 as they did in 2008. The incumbent was Conservative Kelly Block, an administrator from Saskatoon. She held the riding against Delisle farmer and National Farmers Union activist Nettie Wiebe.

Following the Canadian federal electoral redistribution, 2012, the riding was abolished. The Saskatoon portion became part of Saskatoon West, while the rural portions joined Carlton Trail—Eagle Creek and Battlefords—Lloydminster.

== Members of Parliament ==
Parliament	Years	Member	Party
Saskatoon—Rosetown; Riding created from Kindersley—Lloydminster, Saskatoon—Clark's Crossing, Saskatoon—Dundurn and The Battlefords—Meadow Lake
36th	1997–1999	Chris Axworthy	New Democratic
36th	1999–2000	Dennis Gruending	New Democratic
Riding renamed — Saskatoon—Rosetown—Biggar
37th	2000–2003	Carol Skelton	Alliance
37th	2003–2004	Carol Skelton	Conservative
38th	2004–2006	Carol Skelton	Conservative
39th	2006–2008	Carol Skelton	Conservative
40th	2008–2011	Kelly Block	Conservative
41st	2011–2015	Kelly Block	Conservative
Riding dissolved into Carlton Trail—Eagle Creek, Saskatoon West and Battlefords—Lloydminster

== Election results ==
2011 Canadian federal election
Party	Candidate	Votes	%	±%	Expenditures
Conservative	Kelly Block	14,652	48.70	+3.31	$80,469
New Democratic	Nettie Wiebe	14,114	46.91	+2.49	$73,723
Liberal	Lee Reaney	697	2.32	-2.09	$7,509
Green	Vicki Strelioff	626	2.08	-2.49	$1,459
Total valid votes/expense limit		30,089	100.00		$81,126
Total rejected ballots		131	0.43	+0.11	
Turnout		30,220	62.29	+7.47	
Eligible voters		48,516	–	–	

2008 Canadian federal election
Party	Candidate	Votes	%	±%	Expenditures
Conservative	Kelly Block	12,231	45.39	-0.15	$78,169
New Democratic	Nettie Wiebe	11,969	44.42	+5.44	$63,284
Green	Amber Jones	1,232	4.57	+2.05	$8,174
Liberal	Roy Bluehorn	1,188	4.41	-7.67	$10,785
Independent	Rick Barsky	138	0.51	-2.01	N/A
Christian Heritage	Marcel Bourassa	115	0.43	-0.45	$50
Libertarian	Kevin Stricker	73	0.27	–	$1,339
Total valid votes/expense limit		26,946	100.00		$78,625
Total rejected ballots		87	0.32	+0.05	
Turnout		27,033	54.82	-4.90	

2006 Canadian federal election
Party	Candidate	Votes	%	±%	Expenditures
Conservative	x-Carol Skelton	13,331	45.54	+0.70	$58,211
New Democratic	Nettie Wiebe	11,412	38.98	+2.74	$62,156
Liberal	Myron Luczka	3,536	12.08	-3.67	$2,869
Green	Rick Barsky	738	2.52	-0.66	$1,068
Christian Heritage	Marcel Bourassa	258	0.88	–	$4,463
Total valid votes		29,275	100.00		–
Total rejected ballots		78	0.27	-0.08	
Turnout		29,353	59.72	+7.20	

2004 Canadian federal election
Party	Candidate	Votes	%	±%	Expenditures
Conservative	x-Carol Skelton	11,875	44.84	-2.48	$55,798
New Democratic	Dennis Gruending	9,597	36.24	-5.17	$58,518
Liberal	Myron Luczka	4,171	15.75	+4.48	$24,337
Green	Rick Barsky	841	3.18	–	$118
Total valid votes		26,484	100.00		–
Total rejected ballots		92	0.35	0.00	
Turnout		26,576	52.52	-3.1	

Note: Conservative vote is compared to the total of the Canadian Alliance vote and Progressive Conservative vote in the 2000 election.

2000 Canadian federal election
Party	Candidate	Votes	%	±%	Expenditures
Alliance	Carol Skelton	11,177	41.66	+14.05	$54,132
New Democratic	x-Dennis Gruending	11,109	41.41	+0.82	$59,591
Liberal	Alice Farness	3,023	11.27	-4.37	$3,832
Progressive Conservative	Dale Buxton	1,518	5.66	-8.67	$5,021
Total valid votes		26,827	100.00		–
Total rejected ballots		95	0.35	0.00	
Turnout		26,922	55.6	+21.9	

Note: Canadian Alliance vote is compared to the Reform vote in the 1999 by-election.

Canadian federal by-election, November 15, 1999 due to the resignation of Chris Axworthy
Party	Candidate	Votes	%	±%	Expenditures
New Democratic	Dennis Gruending	6,353	40.59	-3.13	$58,658
Reform	Jim McAllister	4,321	27.61	-4.96	$59,422
Liberal	Henry Dayday	2,448	15.64	-0.40	$41,974
Progressive Conservative	Rich Gabruch	2,242	14.33	+7.35	$35,087
Green	David Greenfield	175	1.12	–	$0
Independent	Ace Cetinski	111	0.71	–	$9,527
Total valid votes/expense limit		15,650	100.00		$58,901
Total rejected ballots		55	0.35	+0.06	
Turnout		15,705	33.66	-26.2	

1997 Canadian federal election
Party	Candidate	Votes	%	Expenditures
New Democratic	x-Chris Axworthy	12,095	43.72	$56,131
Reform	x-Elwin Hermanson	9,011	32.57	$33,126
Liberal	Tanyss Munro	4,438	16.04	$37,991
Progressive Conservative	Richard Gabruch	1,931	6.98	$11,361
Canadian Action	Rick Barsky	191	0.69	$1,760
Total valid votes/expense limit		27,666	100.00	$58,640
Total rejected ballots		113	0.41	
Turnout		27,779	59.9	

== See also ==
- List of Canadian electoral districts
- Historical federal electoral districts of Canada
