= Dennis Gruending =

Canadian politician

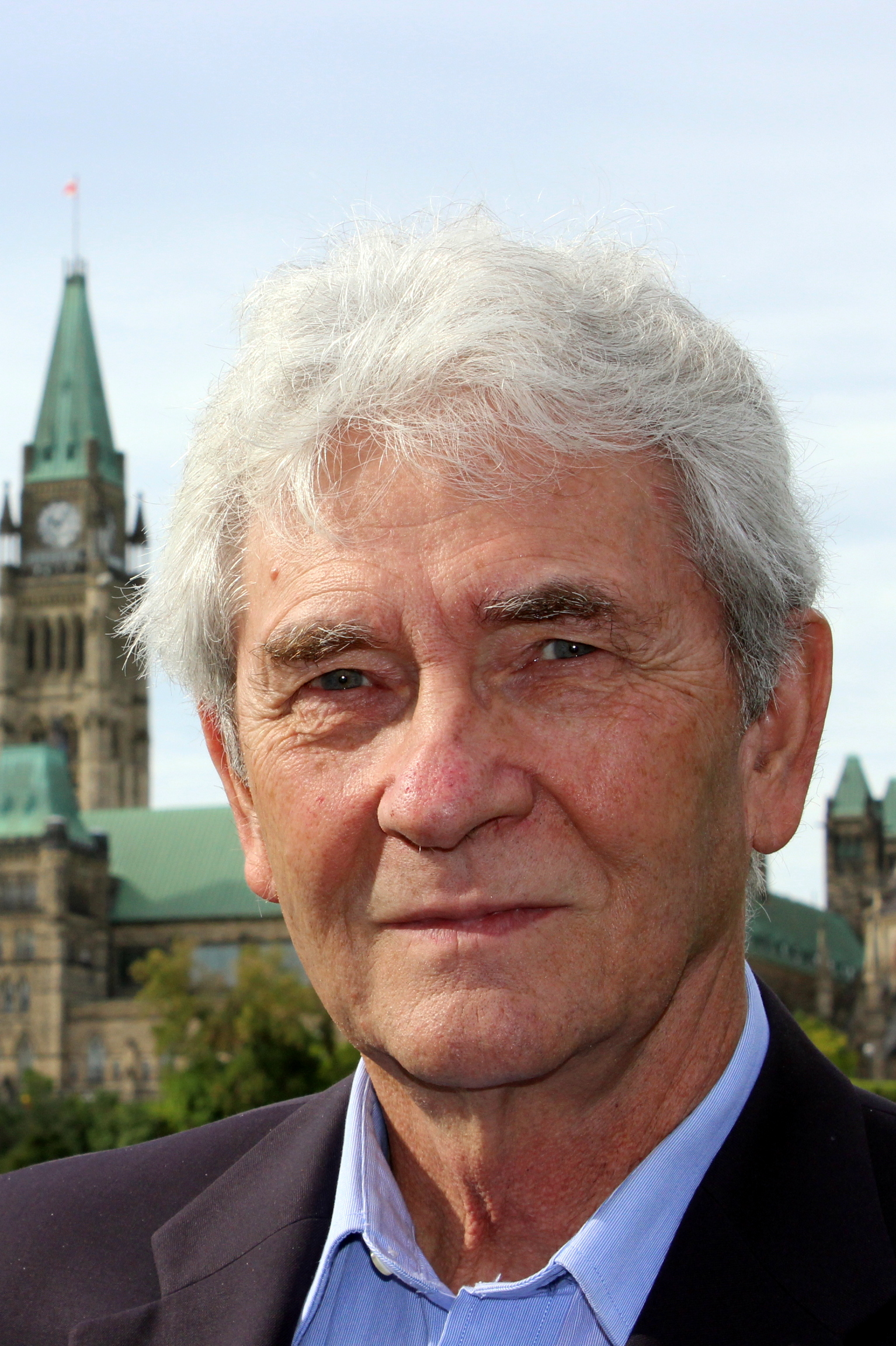
- Dennis Gruending

Member of Parliament for Saskatoon—Rosetown—Biggar
- In office 1999–2000
- Preceded by: Chris Axworthy
- Succeeded by: Carol Skelton

Personal details
- Born: May 18, 1948 (age 78) St. Benedict, Saskatchewan, Canada
- Party: New Democratic Party
- Education: Carleton University; University of Saskatchewan

Dennis Gruending (born May 18, 1948) is a Canadian journalist and politician. He is primarily a writer of non-fiction, but also published a book of poetry and various pieces of short fiction. He is a journalist who has worked for three newspapers and for the Canadian Broadcasting Corporation as a radio host, radio producer, and television reporter.

== Biography ==
Gruending was born in St. Benedict, Saskatchewan, and attended University of Saskatchewan where he received a Bachelor of Arts and Carleton University where he received a Masters in Journalism.

Gruending was elected to Parliament as a New Democratic Party candidate in a 1999 by-election in the riding of Saskatoon—Rosetown—Biggar, following the resignation of Chris Axworthy.

Greuending's 1999 Saskatoon—Rosetown—Biggar by-election campaign came under intense scrutiny from Reform Party candidate Jim McAllister. On one occasion, McAllister, along with a handful of reporters drove to the Gruending home in Saskatoon's north end where McAllister referred to Gruending as a "parachute candidate". To add insult to injury, McAllister showed the media photos of the Gruending home in Ottawa, an oxygen mask because McAllister said that Eastern Canadian residents often complained about the air quality, and a detailed map of the Saskatoon—Rosetown—Biggar riding where McAllister claimed he was the only candidate who actually lived in the riding. Gruending, ended up with the last laugh, defeating both McAllister and Saskatoon mayor Henry Dayday, who was running for the Liberal Party.

Gruending's time as a Member of Parliament was short lived, as he was defeated a year later in the 2000 election, finishing second to Canadian Alliance candidate Carol Skelton. In the 2004 election, Gruending ran again in Saskatoon—Rosetown—Biggar, but again was defeated by Skelton.

Gruending has written eight books, including biographies of former Saskatchewan premier Allan Blakeney, and another of Supreme Court of Canada Justice Emmett Hall. Gruending's latest book, Great Canadian Speeches was published in 2004 and was a Canadian best seller.

Parliament of Canada
| Preceded by Chris Axworthy, New Democrat | Member of Parliament for Saskatoon—Rosetown—Biggar; 1999-2000 | Succeeded by Carol Skelton, Canadian Alliance |
