= Libor Polášek =

Czech ice hockey player (born 1974)

- Born: April 22, 1974 (age 51) Nový Jičín, Czechoslovakia
- Height: 6 ft 4 in (193 cm)
- Weight: 226 lb (103 kg; 16 st 2 lb)
- Position: Centre
- Shot: Left
- Played for: Hamilton Canucks; South Carolina Stingrays; Syracuse Crunch; HC Vítkovice; HC Slavia Praha; HC Opava; HC Plzeň; MsHK Žilina; HKm Zvolen; HC Košice; Dubnica Spartak HC; HC Vsetín
- NHL draft: 21st overall, 1992; Vancouver Canucks
- Playing career: 1991–2007

Libor Polášek (born April 22, 1974) is a retired Czech professional ice hockey centre. He has been described by some Vancouver Canucks fans and journalists as one of the worst first-round draft picks made by that NHL team.

== Playing career ==
The Canucks selected Polasek ahead of their next selection Michael Peca (who played more than 860 NHL regular-season games). The team hoped that the tall (6’4") Czech center would develop into a Mark Messier-like player. Instead, Polasek had difficulty making an impact even at the minor-league level.

He scored a total of just 18 goals over two seasons (1992–1994) playing with the Hamilton Canucks farm team in the AHL. In the AHL playoffs in 1993–94, he scored no goals in three games during Hamilton’s four-games first-round loss to Cornwall.

After a goal-less seven-game stint in the ECHL in 1994–95, he returned to the AHL with the new Canuck affiliate Syracuse Crunch and scored just two goals in 45 games. In 1995–96, he played 19 games in the Czech league then returned to the Crunch for eight more goal-less games. He returned to Europe and in almost a decade of playing for Czech and Slovak teams he scored just 41 goals from 1996–97 to 2005–06.

== Performance reception ==
According to CNNSI.com’s 2001 profile of Canuck draft busts, "Polasek fared worse than the previous three (first-round busts Dan Woodley, Jason Herter and Alek Stojanov) combined -- he never played in an NHL game. In fact, one is hard-pressed to even find statistics on Polasek in many hockey annals."

The Vancouver Sun’s Iain MacIntyre also wrote in 2001 that if "nuclear winter" set in due to the Canuck draft record in the 80s, then the team "detonated the H-bomb on themselves in 1992 in the form of Libor Polasek, who soon vanished. Not so the Canucks' reputation for picking more duds than CBS programmers."

== Career statistics ==
=== Regular season and playoffs ===
			Regular season					Playoffs
Season	Team	League	GP	G	A	Pts	PIM	GP	G	A	Pts	PIM
1991–92	TJ Vítkovice	TCH	15	2	2	4		2	0	0	0
1992–93	Hamilton Canucks	AHL	60	7	12	19	34	—	—	—	—	—
1993–94	Hamilton Canucks	AHL	76	11	12	23	40	3	0	0	0	0
1994–95	Syracuse Crunch	AHL	45	2	8	10	16	—	—	—	—	—
1994–95	South Carolina Stingrays	ECHL	7	0	0	0	6	—	—	—	—	—
1995–96	Syracuse Crunch	AHL	8	0	2	2	6	—	—	—	—	—
1995–96	HC Vítkovice	ELH	19	4	5	9	26	3	0	0	0	2
1996–97	HC Vítkovice	ELH	23	4	4	8	56	—	—	—	—	—
1996–97	HC Slavia Praha	ELH	12	3	1	4	55	—	—	—	—	—
1997–98	HC Vítkovice	ELH	47	10	9	19	52	11	3	4	7	24
1998–99	HC Opava	ELH	35	5	6	11	80	—	—	—	—	—
1998–99	HC Vítkovice	ELH	8	2	1	3	39	—	—	—	—	—
1999–2000	HC Vítkovice	ELH	27	7	8	15	44	—	—	—	—	—
2000–01	HC Vítkovice	ELH	36	3	6	9	54	—	—	—	—	—
2000–01	HC Keramika Plzeň	ELH	10	2	1	3	6	—	—	—	—	—
2001–02	IF Sundsvall Hockey	SWE.2	35	13	11	24	67	—	—	—	—	—
2002–03	HC Ytong Brno	CZE.2	36	9	15	24	73	—	—	—	—	—
2003–04	HK 32 Liptovský Mikuláš	SVK	37	3	8	11	51	—	—	—	—	—
2003–04	HKM Zvolen	SVK	8	2	3	5	18	17	2	2	4	39
2004–05	HC Kosice	SVK	15	0	0	0	22	—	—	—	—	—
2004–05	Spartak Dubnica nad Váhom	SVK	19	0	1	1	10	—	—	—	—	—
2005–06	Vsetínská hokejová	ELH	2	0	0	0	0	—	—	—	—	—
2005–06	HC Sareza Ostrava	CZE.2	37	10	8	18	77	—	—	—	—	—
2006–07	HC Sareza Ostrava	CZE.2	3	0	3	3	0	—	—	—	—	—
2006–07	HC Bobři Valašské Meziříčí	CZE.3	3	0	1	1	2	—	—	—	—	—
2007–08	HC Kopřivnice	CZE.4
2008–09	HC Kopřivnice	CZE.4
2009–10	HC Kopřivnice	CZE.4	3	2	1	3		—	—	—	—	—
AHL totals			189	20	34	54	96	3	0	0	0	0
ELH totals			234	42	43	85	412	16	3	4	7	26

=== International ===
Year	Team	Event	GP	G	A	Pts	PIM
1992	Czechoslovakia	EJC	6	2	0	2	2

== See also ==
- List of AHL seasons

Preceded by Alek Stojanov	Vancouver Canucks first-round draft pick 1992	Succeeded by Mike Wilson
