= Radisson (disambiguation) =

Radisson is an international upscale hotel and resort chain of Radisson Hotel Group.

Radisson may also refer to:

== Places ==
=== Canada ===
- Radisson (electoral district), a provincial electoral division in Manitoba
- Radisson, Quebec, a small village
- Radisson, Saskatchewan, a town
- Radisson Heights, Calgary, Alberta, a neighbourhood
- Radisson Lake (Saskatchewan), a salt lake in Saskatchewan

=== United States ===
- Radisson, New York, a census-designated place
- Radisson (town), Wisconsin
  - Radisson, Wisconsin, a village
- Radisson Lake, a lake in Minnesota

== Other uses ==
- Radisson, a former train which operated on the current route of the Hiawatha (Amtrak train), which operates between Chicago and Milwaukee
- Radisson (TV series), a Canadian adventure series
- Radisson Hotel Group, an American multi national hospitality group
- Radisson Red, an international hotel chain
- Radisson station, a subway station of the Montreal Metro
- Radisson Substation, an electrical substation near Radisson, Quebec

== People with the surname ==
- Pierre-Esprit Radisson (1636–1710), French explorer and fur trader in North America

== See also ==
- CCGS Pierre Radisson, an icebreaker
