= List of Vancouver Canucks draft picks =

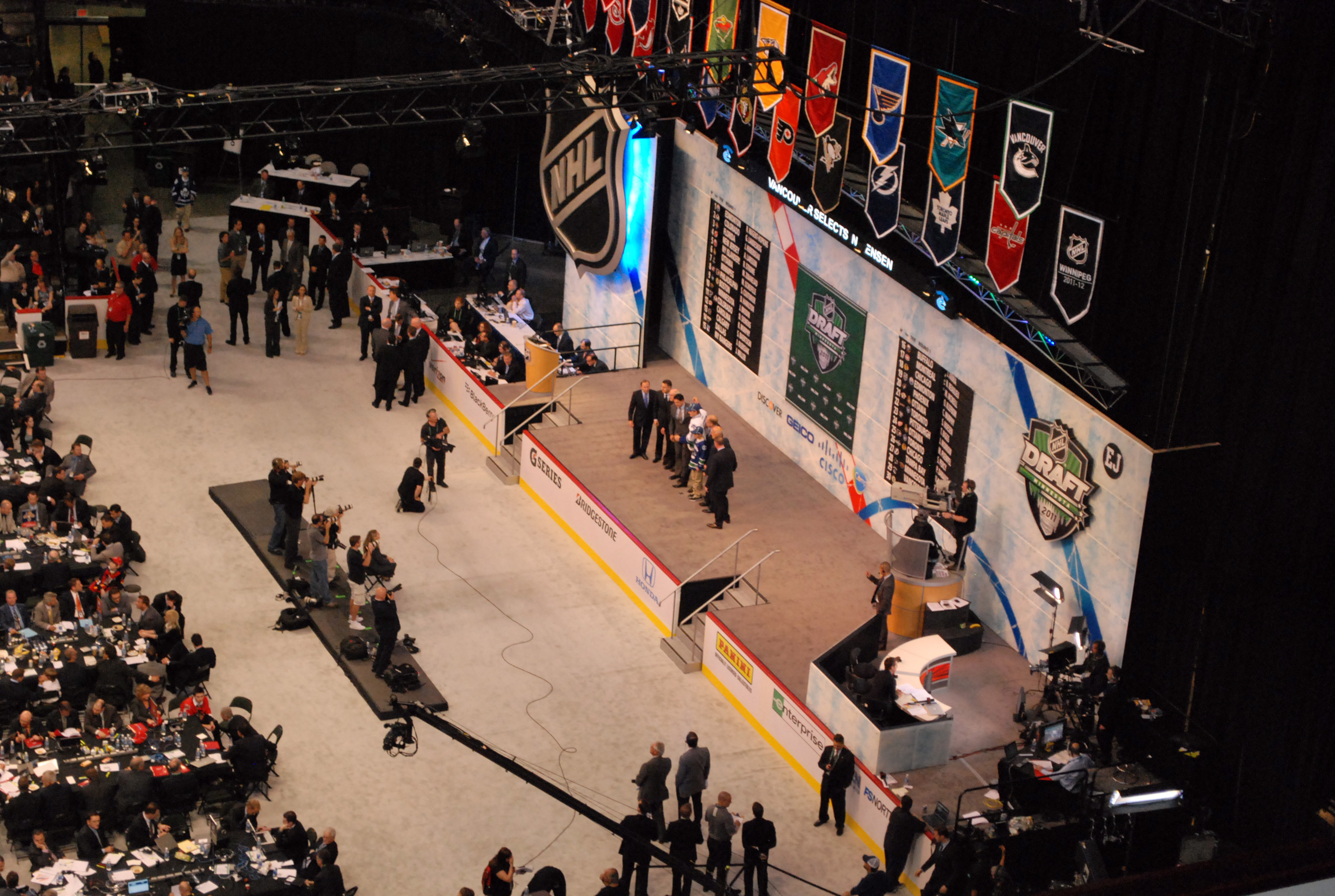
At the 2011 NHL entry draft the Canucks used their first pick, number 29 overall, to select Nicklas Jensen.

The Vancouver Canucks are a professional ice hockey team based in Vancouver, British Columbia, Canada. They play at the 18,810-capacity Rogers Arena. They are members of the Pacific Division of the Western Conference of the National Hockey League (NHL). The Canucks joined the NHL in 1970 as an expansion team alongside the Buffalo Sabres. In the Canucks' 56-year NHL history, the team has advanced three times to the Stanley Cup Final. They were defeated in all three attempts; once in a four-game sweep by the New York Islanders in 1982, and the other two times in a seven-game series by the New York Rangers in 1994, and by the Boston Bruins in 2011.

The Canucks selected Dale Tallon, a defenceman from the Toronto Marlboros, with their first pick, second overall in the 1970 NHL Amateur Draft. The Canucks also drafted Trevor Linden from the Medicine Hat Tigers in 1988. Linden would serve as the Canucks president of hockey operations from 2014 to 2018.

All-time, the Canucks have had 15 top-five draft picks but have never drafted first overall or won the draft lottery, although they did trade for the first overall pick in 1999, before trading it away to become one of the two franchises in the NHL to have drafted two twin brothers in the same year—they drafted Daniel Sedin second overall and Henrik Sedin third overall.

Since the introduction of the draft lottery in 1995, the Canucks have fallen a combined 11 draft positions, the most out of any active team in the league. (Note: Since the 1995 draft, the Canucks qualified for the draft lottery by missing the playoffs 16 times. This includes the cancelled 2004-05 season and draft, which used the lottery to randomly determine the draft order for all teams. Of those 16 lottery-eligible drafts, the Canucks have fallen in draft position in seven of them: 1998: Dropped one draft position, from 3rd to 4th, when the 3rd overall pick was awarded to the Nashville Predators expansion franchise.; 1999: Dropped one draft position, from 2nd to 3rd, when the 2nd overall pick was awarded to the Atlanta Thrashers expansion franchise.; 2016: Dropped two draft positions, from 3rd to 5th, when the Winnipeg Jets won the second lottery to pick 2nd overall and the Columbus Blue Jackets won the third lottery to pick 3rd overall.; 2017: Dropped three draft positions, from 2nd to 5th, when the New Jersey Devils, Philadelphia Flyers, and Dallas Stars won the draft lotteries to pick 1st, 2nd, and 3rd overall respectively.; 2018: Dropped one draft position, from 6th to 7th, when the Carolina Hurricanes won the second lottery to move up to 2nd overall.; 2019: Dropped one draft position, from 9th to 10th, when the Chicago Blackhawks won the third lottery to move up to 3rd overall.; 2026: Dropped two draft positions, from 1st to 3rd, when Toronto Maple Leafs won the first lottery to move up to 1st overall and the San Jose Sharks won the second lottery to move up to 2nd overall.; In total: 1+1+2+3+1+1+2=11 draft positions fallen. Additional Notes: The Canucks also fell from 1st to 3rd in the 1972 draft when the 1st and 2nd overall picks were awarded to the New York Islanders and Atlanta Flames expansion franchises.; The other 9 times the Canucks had lottery-eligible draft picks, they did not move in draft position.; The next worst teams are the Detroit Red Wings and Ottawa Senators, both having lost 9 total draft positions.)

== Key ==
Abbreviation	Meaning
Rd #	Round number
Pick #	Overall draft pick within that draft year
Nat	Nationality
Pos	Hockey position
Reg GP	Regular season games played with Vancouver
Pl GP	Playoff games played with Vancouver
C	Centre
W	Winger
LW	Left wing
RW	Right wing
D	Defence
G	Goaltender
Bold lettering	Currently on the Vancouver Canucks roster

== 1970 Draft ==
Rd #	Pick #	Player	Nat	Pos	Team (League)	Reg GP	Pl GP	Notes
1	2	Dale Tallon	(Canada)	D	Toronto Marlboros (OHA)	222	0	
2	16	Jim Hargreaves	(Canada)	D	Winnipeg Jets (WCHL)	66	0	
3	30	Ed Dyck	(Canada)	G	Calgary Centennials (WCHL)	49	0	
4	44	Brent Taylor	(Canada)	RW	Estevan Bruins (WCHL)	0	0	
5	58	Bill McFadden	(Canada)	-	Swift Current Broncos (WCHL)	0	0	
6	72	Dave Gilmour	(Canada)	LW	London Knights (OHA)	0	0	

== 1971 Draft ==
Rd #	Pick #	Player	Nat	Pos	Team (League)	Reg GP	Pl GP	Notes
1	3	Jocelyn Guevremont	(Canada)	D	Montreal Jr. Canadiens (OHA)	227	0	
2	17	Bobby Lalonde	(Canada)	C	Montreal Jr. Canadiens (OHA)	353	6	
3	39	Richard Lemieux	(Canada)	C	Montreal Jr. Canadiens (OHA)	192	0	
5	59	Mike McNiven	(Canada)	RW	Hamilton Red Wings (OHA)	0	0	
6	73	Tim Steeves	(Canada)	D	PEI Islanders (Junior)	0	0	
7	87	Bill Green	(United States)	D	University of Notre Dame (NCAA)	0	0	
8	101	Norm Cherrey	(Canada)	RW	University of Wisconsin–Madison (CCHA)	0	0	
8	102	Bob Murphy	(Canada)	F	Cornwall Royals (QMJHL)	0	0	

== 1972 Draft ==
Rd #	Pick #	Player	Nat	Pos	Team (League)	Reg GP	Pl GP	Notes
1	3	Don Lever	(Canada)	LW	Niagara Falls Flyers (OHA)	593	10	
2	19	Bryan McSheffrey	(Canada)	F	Ottawa 67's (OHA)	87	0	
3	35	Paul Raymer	(Canada)	F	Peterborough Petes (OHA)	0	0	
4	51	Ron Homenuke	(Canada)	F	Calgary Centennials (WCHL)	1	0	
5	67	Larry Bolonchuk	(Canada)	D	Winnipeg Jets (WCHL)	15	0	
6	83	Dave McLelland	(Canada)	G	Penticton Broncos (BCJHL)	2	0	
7	99	Danny Gloor	(Canada)	C	Peterborough Petes (OHA)	2	0	
8	115	Dennis McCord	(Canada)	D	London Knights (OHA)	3	0	
9	131	Steve Stone	(Canada)	RW	Niagara Falls Flyers (OHA)	2	0	

== 1973 Draft ==
Rd #	Pick #	Player	Nat	Pos	Team (League)	Reg GP	Pl GP	Notes
1	3	Dennis Ververgaert	(Canada)	RW	London Knights (OHA)	409	3	
1	9	Bob Dailey	(Canada)	D	Toronto Marlboros (OHA)	257	7	
2	19	Paulin Bordeleau	(Canada)	C	Toronto Marlboros (OHA)	183	5	
3	35	Paul Sheard	(England)	LW	Ottawa 67's (OHA)	0	0	
4	51	Keith Mackie	(Canada)	D	Edmonton Oil Kings (WCHL)	0	0	
5	67	Paul O'Neil	(United States)	C	Boston University (NCAA)	5	0	
6	83	Jim Cowell	(Canada)	F	Ottawa 67's (OHA)	0	0	
7	99	Clay Hebenton	(Canada)	G		0	0	
8	115	John Senkpiel	(Canada)	RW	Calgary Centennials (WCHL)	0	0	
9	131	Peter Folco	(Canada)	D	Quebec Remparts (QMJHL)	2	0	
9	146	Terry McDougall	(Canada)	C	Swift Current Broncos (WCHL)	0	0	

== 1974 Draft ==
Rd #	Pick #	Player	Nat	Pos	Team (League)	Reg GP	Pl GP	Notes
2	23	Ron Sedlbauer	(Canada)	LW	Kitchener Rangers (OHA)	325	10	
3	41	John Hughes	(Canada)	D	Toronto Marlboros (OHA)	52	4	
4	59	Harold Snepsts	(Canada)	D	Edmonton Oil Kings (WCHL)	781	44	
5	77	Mike Rogers	(Canada)	C	Calgary Centennials (WCHL)	0	0	
6	95	Andy Spruce	(Canada)	LW	London Knights (OHA)	51	0	
7	113	Jim Clarke	(Canada)	D	Toronto Marlboros (OHA)	0	0	
8	130	Robbie Watt	(Canada)	F	Flin Flon Bombers (WCHL)	0	0	
9	147	Marc Gaudreault	(Canada)	D	Lake Superior State University (NCAA)	0	0	

== 1975 Draft ==
Rd #	Pick #	Player	Nat	Pos	Team (League)	Reg GP	Pl GP	Notes
1	10	Rick Blight	(Canada)	RW	Brandon Wheat Kings (WCHL)	324	5	
2	28	Brad Gassoff	(Canada)	LW	Kamloops Chiefs (WCHL)	122	3	
3	46	Normand LaPointe	(Canada)	G	Trois-Rivieres Draveurs (QMJHL)	0	0	
4	64	Glen Richardson	(Canada)	LW	Hamilton Fincups (OHA)	24	0	
5	82	Doug Murray	(Canada)	LW	Brandon Wheat Kings (WCHL)	0	0	
6	100	Bob Watson	(Canada)	RW	Flin Flon Bombers (WCHL)	0	0	
7	118	Brian Shmyr	(Canada)	C	New Westminster Bruins (WCHL)	0	0	
8	136	Allan Fleck	(Canada)	LW	New Westminster Bruins (WCHL)	0	0	
9	152	Bob McNeice	(Canada)	LW	New Westminster Bruins (WCHL)	0	0	
11	182	Sidney Veysey	(Canada)	C	Sherbrooke Beavers (QMJHL)	1	0	

== 1976 Draft ==
Rd #	Pick #	Player	Nat	Pos	Team (League)	Reg GP	Pl GP	Notes
2	26	Bob Manno	(Canada)	F	St. Catharines Black Hawks (OHA)	163	10	
3	44	Rob Flockhart	(Canada)	LW	Kamloops Chiefs (WCHL)	43	0	
4	62	Elmer Ray	(Canada)	LW	Calgary Centennials (WCHL)	0	0	
5	80	Rick Durston	(Canada)	LW	Victoria Cougars (WCHL)	0	0	
6	98	Rob Tudor	(Canada)	C	Regina Pats (WCHL)	26	3	
7	114	Brad Rhiness	(Canada)	C	Kingston Canadians (OHA)	0	0	
8	122	Stuart Ostlund	(Canada)	C	Michigan Tech (NCAA)	0	0	

== 1977 Draft ==
Rd #	Pick #	Player	Nat	Pos	Team (League)	Reg GP	Pl GP	Notes
1	4	Jere Gillis	(United States)	F	Sherbrooke Beavers (QMJHL)	235	1	
2	22	Jeff Bandura	(Canada)	D	Portland Winter Hawks (WCHL)	0	0	
3	40	Glen Hanlon	(Canada)	G	Brandon Wheat Kings (WCHL)	137	2	
4	56	Dave Morrow	(Canada)	D	Calgary Centennials (WCHL)	0	0	
4	58	Murray Bannerman	(Canada)	G	Victoria Cougars (WCHL)	1	0	
5	76	Steve Hazlett	(Canada)	LW	St. Catharines Fincups (OHA)	1	0	
6	94	Brian Drumm	(Canada)	LW	Peterborough Petes (OHA)	0	0	
7	112	Ray Creasy	(Canada)	C	New Westminster Bruins (WCHL)	0	0	

== 1978 Draft ==
Rd #	Pick #	Player	Nat	Pos	Team (League)	Reg GP	Pl GP	Notes
1	4	Bill Derlago	(Canada)	C	Brandon Wheat Kings (WCHL)	63	0	
2	22	Curt Fraser	(United States)	LW	Victoria Cougars (WCHL)	348	27	
3	40	Stan Smyl	(Canada)	W	New Westminster Bruins (WCHL)	896	41	#12 retired by the Canucks
4	56	Harold Luckner	(Sweden)		Farjestad BK (SEL)	0	0	
4	57	Brad Smith	(Canada)	F	Sudbury Wolves (OHA)	21	0	
6	90	Gerry Minor	(Canada)	C	Regina Pats (WCHL)	140	12	
7	107	Dave Ross	(Canada)	RW	Portland Winter Hawks (WCHL)	0	0	
8	124	Steve O'Neill	(United States)	W	Providence College (NCAA)	0	0	
9	141	Charlie Antetomaso	(United States)	D	Boston College (NCAA)	0	0	
10	158	Rick Martens	(Canada)	G	New Westminster Bruins (WCHL)	0	0	

== 1979 Draft ==
Rd #	Pick #	Player	Nat	Pos	Team (League)	Reg GP	Pl GP	Notes
1	5	Rick Vaive	(Canada)	RW	Birmingham Bulls (WHA)	47	0	
2	26	Brent Ashton	(Canada)	F	Saskatoon Blades (WCHL)	124	7	
3	47	Ken Ellacott	(Canada)	G	Peterborough Petes (OHA)	12	0	
4	68	Art Rutland	(Canada)	F	Sault Ste. Marie Greyhounds (OHA)	0	0	
5	89	Dirk Graham	(Canada)	F	Regina Pats (WCHL)	0	0	
6	110	Shane Swan	(Canada)	D	Sudbury Wolves (OHA)	0	0	

== 1980 Draft ==
Rd #	Pick #	Player	Nat	Pos	Team (League)	Reg GP	Pl GP	Notes
1	10	Rick Lanz	(Czech Republic)	D	Oshawa Generals (OHA)	417	14	
3	49	Andy Schliebener	(Canada)	D	Peterborough Petes (OHA)	84	6	
4	70	Marc Crawford	(Canada)	LW	Cornwall Royals (QMJHL)	176	20	
5	91	Darrell May	(Canada)	G	Portland Winter Hawks (WHL)	0	0	
6	112	Ken Berry	(Canada)	W	Canadian international team (Intl)	27	0	
7	133	Doug Lidster	(Canada)	D	Colorado College (NCAA)	666	41	
8	154	John O'Connor			University of Vermont (NCAA)	0	0	
9	175	Patrik Sundstrom	(Sweden)	F	IF Bjorkloven (SEL)	374	11	
10	196	Grant Martin	(Canada)	C	Kitchener Rangers (OHA)	24	0	

== 1981 Draft ==
Rd #	Pick #	Player	Nat	Pos	Team (League)	Reg GP	Pl GP	Notes
1	10	Garth Butcher	(Canada)	D	Regina Pats (WHL)	610	14	
3	52	Jean-Marc Lanthier	(Canada)	RW	Sorel Black Hawks (QMJHL)	105	0	
4	73	Wendell Young	(Canada)	G	Kitchener Rangers (OHL)	30	0	
5	105	Moe Lemay	(Canada)	F	Ottawa 67's (OHL)	279	4	
6	115	Stu Kulak	(Canada)	RW	Victoria Cougars (WHL)	32	0	
7	136	Bruce Holloway	(Canada)	D	Regina Pats (WHL)	2	0	
8	157	Petri Skriko	(Finland)	F	SaiPa (SM-liiga)	472	10	
9	178	Frank Caprice	(Canada)	G	London Knights (OHL)	102	0	
10	199	Rejean Vignola	(Canada)	F	Shawinigan Cataractes (QMJHL)	0	0	

== 1982 Draft ==
Rd #	Pick #	Player	Nat	Pos	Team (League)	Reg GP	Pl GP	Notes
1	11	Michel Petit	(Canada)	D	Sherbrooke Beavers (QMJHL)	226	0	
3	53	Yves Lapointe	(Canada)	LW	Shawinigan Cataractes (QMJHL)	0	0	
4	71	Shawn Kilroy	(Canada)	G	Peterborough Petes (OHL)	0	0	
6	116	Taylor Hall	(Canada)	RW	Regina Pats (WHL)	34	0	
7	137	Parie Proft	(Canada)	D	Calgary Wranglers (WHL)	0	0	
8	158	Newell Brown	(Canada)	C	Michigan State University (NCAA)	0	0	
9	179	Don McLaren	(Canada)	RW	Ottawa 67's (OHL)	0	0	
10	200	Al Raymond	(Canada)	LW	Niagara Falls Flyers (OHL)	0	0	
11	221	Steve Driscoll	(Canada)	LW	Cornwall Royals (OHL)	0	0	
12	242	Shawn Green	(Canada)	RW	Victoria Cougars (WHL)	0	0	

== 1983 Draft ==
Rd #	Pick #	Player	Nat	Pos	Team (League)	Reg GP	Pl GP	Notes
1	9	Cam Neely	(Canada)	F	Portland Winter Hawks (WHL)	201	7	Inducted into Hockey Hall of Fame in 2005
2	30	David Bruce	(Canada)	LW	Kitchener Rangers (OHL)	143	1	
3	50	Scott Tottle	(Canada)	LW	Peterborough Petes (OHL)	0	0	
4	70	Tim Lorenz	(Canada)	RW	Portland Winter Hawks (WHL)	0	0	
5	90	Doug Quinn	(Canada)	D	Nanaimo Islanders (WHL)	0	0	
6	110	Dave Lowry	(Canada)	LW	London Knights (OHL)	165	3	
7	130	Terry Maki	(Canada)	LW	Brantford Alexanders (OHL)	0	0	
8	150	John Labatt	(United States)	C	University of Minnesota (NCAA)	0	0	
9	170	Allan Measures	(Canada)	D	Calgary Wranglers (WHL)	0	0	
10	190	Roger Grillo	(United States)	D	University of Maine (NCAA)	0	0	
11	210	Steve Kayser	(Canada)	D	University of Vermont (NCAA)	0	0	
12	230	Jay Mazur	(Canada)	W	University of Maine (NCAA)	47	6	

== 1984 Draft ==
Rd #	Pick #	Player	Nat	Pos	Team (League)	Reg GP	Pl GP	Notes
1	10	J. J. Daigneault	(Canada)	D	Longueuil Chevaliers (QMJHL)	131	3	
2	31	Jeff Rohlicek	(United States)	C	Portland Winter Hawks (WHL)	9	0	
3	52	David Saunders	(Canada)	LW	St. Lawrence University (NCAA)	56	0	
3	55	Landis Chaulk	(Canada)	F	Calgary Wranglers (WHL)	0	0	
3	58	Mike Stevens	(Canada)	LW	Kitchener Rangers (OHL)	6	0	
4	73	Brian Bertuzzi	(Canada)	D	Kamloops Junior Oilers (WHL)	0	0	
5	94	Brett MacDonald	(Canada)	D	North Bay Centennials (OHL)	1	0	
6	115	Jeff Korchinski	(Canada)	D	Clarkson University (NCAA)	0	0	
7	136	Blaine Chrest	(Canada)	C	Portland Winter Hawks (WHL)	0	0	
8	157	Jim Agnew	(Canada)	D	Brandon Wheat Kings (WHL)	63	4	
9	178	Rex Grant	(Canada)	G	Kamloops Junior Oilers (WHL)	0	0	
10	198	Ed Lowney	(United States)	F	Boston University (NCAA)	0	0	
11	219	Doug Clarke	(Canada)	D	Colorado College (NCAA)	0	0	
12	239	Ed Kister	(Canada)	D	London Knights (OHL)	0	0	

== 1985 Draft ==
Rd #	Pick #	Player	Nat	Pos	Team (League)	Reg GP	Pl GP	Notes
1	4	Jim Sandlak	(Canada)	RW	London Knights (OHL)	509	33	
2	25	Troy Gamble	(Canada)	G	Medicine Hat Tigers (WHL)	72	4	
3	46	Shane Doyle	(Canada)	D	Belleville Bulls (OHL)	0	0	
4	67	Randy Siska	(Canada)	C	Medicine Hat Tigers (WHL)	0	0	
5	88	Robert Kron	(Czech Republic)	C	Brno ZKL (Czech)	144	11	
6	109	Martin Hrstka	(Slovakia)	F	Dukla Trencin (Slovak)	0	0	
7	130	Brian McFarlane	(Canada)	RW	Seattle Breakers (WHL)	0	0	
8	151	Hakan Ahlund	(Sweden)	RW	Malmo IF (SWE)	0	0	
9	172	Curtis Hunt	(Canada)	D	Prince Albert Raiders (WHL)	0	0	
10	193	Carl Valimont	(United States)	D	University of Lowell (NCAA)	0	0	
11	214	Igor Larionov	(Russia)	C	CSKA Moscow (Soviet Union)	210	19	Inducted into Hockey Hall of Fame in 2008
12	235	Darren Taylor	(Canada)	LW	Calgary Wranglers (WHL)	0	0	

== 1986 Draft ==
Rd #	Pick #	Player	Nat	Pos	Team (League)	Reg GP	Pl GP	Notes
1	7	Dan Woodley	(United States)	C	Portland Winter Hawks (WHL)	5	0	
3	49	Don Gibson	(Canada)	D	Michigan State University (NCAA)	14	0	
4	70	Ronnie Stern	(Canada)	RW	Longueuil Chevaliers (QMJHL)	97	3	
5	91	Eric Murano	(Canada)	C	University of Denver (NCAA)	0	0	
6	112	Steve Herniman	(Canada)	D	Cornwall Royals (OHL)	0	0	
7	133	Jon Helgeson	(United States)	LW	University of Wisconsin–Madison (NCAA)	0	0	
8	154	Jeff Noble	(Canada)	C	Kitchener Rangers (OHL)	0	0	
9	175	Matt Merten	(United States)	G	Providence College (NCAA)	0	0	
10	196	Marc Lyons	(Canada)	D	Kingston Canadians (OHL)	0	0	
11	217	Todd Hawkins	(Canada)	LW	Belleville Bulls (OHL)	8	0	
12	138	Vladimir Krutov	(Russia)	F	CSKA Moscow (Soviet Union)	61	0	

== 1987 Draft ==
Rd #	Pick #	Player	Nat	Pos	Team (League)	Reg GP	Pl GP	Notes
2	24	Rob Murphy	(Canada)	C	Laval Titan (QMJHL)	73	4	
3	45	Steve Veilleux	(Canada)	D	Trois-Rivieres Draveurs (QMJHL)	0	0	
4	66	Doug Torrel	(Canada)	RW	University of Minnesota–Duluth (NCAA)	0	0	
5	87	Sean Fabian	(United States)	D	University of Minnesota (NCAA)	0	0	
6	108	Garry Valk	(Canada)	LW	Sherwood Park (AJHL)	172	16	
7	129	Todd Fanning	(Canada)	G	Ohio State University (NCAA)	0	0	
8	150	Viktor Tyumenev	(Russia)	C	CSKA Moscow (Soviet Union)	0	0	
9	171	Craig Daly	(United States)	D	New Hampton Prep (N.H.)	0	0	
10	192	John Fletcher	(United States)	G	Clarkson University (NCAA)	0	0	
11	213	Roger Hansson	(Sweden)	F	Malmo IF (Swe)	0	0	Olympic Champion
12	233	Neil Eisenhut	(Canada)	C	Langley Eagles (BCJHL)	13	0	
12	234	Matt Evo	(United States)	LW	Country Day High School (Mass)	0	0	

== 1988 Draft ==
Rd #	Pick #	Player	Nat	Pos	Team (League)	Reg GP	Pl GP	Notes
1	2	Trevor Linden	(Canada)	C	Medicine Hat Tigers (WHL)	1140	118	Won 1997 King Clancy Memorial Trophy #16 retired by the Canucks
2	33	Leif Rohlin	(Sweden)	D	VIK Vasteras HK (Swe)	95	5	
3	44	Dane Jackson	(Canada)	RW	Vernon Lakers (BCJHL)	15	6	
6	107	Corrie D'Alessio	(Canada)	G	Cornell University (NCAA)	0	0	
6	122	Phil Von Stefenelli	(Canada)	D	Boston University (NCAA)	0	0	
7	128	Dixon Ward	(Canada)	RW	University of North Dakota (NCAA)	103	9	
8	149	Greg Geldart	(Canada)	C	St. Albert Saints (AJHL)	0	0	
9	170	Roger Akerstrom	(Sweden)	D	Lulea HF (SWE)	0	0	
10	191	Paul Constantin	(Canada)	LW	Lake Superior State University (NCAA)	0	0	
11	212	Chris Wolanin	(United States)	D	University of Illinois (NCAA)	0	0	
12	233	Stefan Nilsson	(Sweden)	C	Farjestad BK (Swe)	0	0	

== 1989 Draft ==
Rd #	Pick #	Player	Nat	Pos	Team (League)	Reg GP	Pl GP	Notes
1	8	Jason Herter	(Canada)	D	University of North Dakota (NCAA)	0	0	
2	29	Rob Woodward	(United States)	LW	Michigan State University (NCAA)	0	0	
4	71	Brett Hauer	(United States)	D	University of Minnesota-Duluth (NCAA)	0	0	
6	113	Pavel Bure	(Russia)	RW	CSKA Moscow (Soviet Union)	428	60	Won Calder Memorial Trophy in 1992; Inducted into Hockey Hall of Fame in 2012 #10 retired by the Canucks
7	134	Jim Revenberg	(Canada)	RW	Windsor Spitfires (OHL)	0	0	
8	155	Rob Sangster	(Canada)	LW	Kitchener Rangers (OHL)	0	0	
9	176	Sandy Moger	(Canada)	RW	Lake Superior State University (NCAA)	0	0	
10	197	Gus Morschauser	(Canada)	G	Kitchener Rangers (OHL)	0	0	
11	218	Hayden O'Rear	(United States)	D	Lathrop High School (Alaska)	0	0	
12	239	Darcy Cahill	(Canada)	C	Cornwall Royals (OHL)	0	0	
12	248	Jan Bergman	(Sweden)	D	Sodertalje SK (Swe)	0	0	

== 1990 Draft ==
Rd #	Pick #	Player	Nat	Pos	Team (League)	Reg GP	Pl GP	Notes
1	2	Petr Nedved	(Czech Republic)	LW	Seattle Thunderbirds (WHL)	222	28	
1	18	Shawn Antoski	(Canada)	LW	North Bay Centennials (OHL)	70	15	
2	23	Jiri Slegr	(Czech Republic)	D	CHZ Litvinov (Czechoslovakia)	154	5	
4	65	Darin Bader	(Canada)	LW	Saskatoon Blades (WHL)	0	0	
5	86	Gino Odjick	(Canada)	LW	Laval Titan (QMJHL)	444	32	
7	128	Daryl Filipek	(Canada)	D	Ferris State University (NCAA)	0	0	
8	149	Paul O'Hagan	(Republic of Ireland)	D	Oshawa Generals (OHL)	0	0	
9	170	Mark Cipriano	(Canada)	D	Victoria Cougars (WHL)	0	0	
10	191	Troy Neumeier	(Canada)	D	Prince Albert Raiders (WHL)	0	0	
11	212	Tyler Ertel	(Canada)	C	North Bay Centennials (OHL)	0	0	
12	233	Karri Kivi	(Finland)	D	Ilves (Finland)	0	0	

== 1991 Draft ==
Rd #	Pick #	Player	Nat	Pos	Team (League)	Reg GP	Pl GP	Notes
1	7	Alex Stojanov	(Canada)	RW	Hamilton Dukes (OHL)	62	5	
2	29	Jassen Cullimore	(Canada)	D	Peterborough Petes (OHL)	84	11	
3	51	Sean Pronger	(Canada)	C	Bowling Green State University (NCAA)	3	0	
5	95	Dan Kesa	(Canada)	RW	Prince Albert Raiders (WHL)	19	0	
6	117	Evgeny Namestnikov	(Russia)	D	CSKA Moscow (Soviet Union)	35	2	
7	139	Brent Thurston	(Canada)	LW	Spokane Chiefs (WHL)	0	0	
8	161	Eric Johnson	(United States)	RW	Plymouth Armstrong High School (USHS-MN)	0	0	
9	183	David Neilson	(United States)	LW	Prince Albert Raiders (WHL)	0	0	
10	205	Brad Barton	(Canada)	D	Kitchener Rangers (OHL)	0	0	
11	227	Jason Fitzsimmons	(Canada)	G	Moose Jaw Warriors (WHL)	0	0	
12	249	Xavier Majic	(Canada)	C	Rensselaer Polytechnic Institute (NCAA)	0	0	

== 1992 Draft ==
Rd #	Pick #	Player	Nat	Pos	Team (League)	Reg GP	Pl GP	Notes
1	21	Libor Polasek	(Czech Republic)	C	TJ Vitkovice (Czechoslovakia)	0	0	
2	40	Michael Peca	(Canada)	C	Ottawa 67's (OHL)	37	5	
2	45	Mike Fountain	(Canada)	G	Oshawa Generals (OHL)	6	0	
3	69	Jeff Connolly	(United States)	RW	Saint Sebastian's School (USHS–MS)	0	0	
4	93	Brent Tully	(Canada)	D	Peterborough Petes (OHL)	0	0	
5	110	Brian Loney	(Canada)	RW	Ohio State University (NCAA)	12	0	
5	117	Adrian Aucoin	(Canada)	D	Boston University (NCAA)	341	10	
6	141	Jason Clark	(Canada)	LW	St. Thomas (MOJHL)	0	0	
7	165	Scott Hollis	(Canada)	RW	Oshawa Generals (OHL)	0	0	
9	213	Sonny Mignacca	(Canada)	G	Medicine Hat Tigers (WHL)	0	0	
10	237	Mark Wotton	(Canada)	D	Saskatoon Blades (WHL)	42	0	
11	261	Aaron Boh	(Canada)	D	Spokane Chiefs (WHL)	0	0	

== 1993 Draft ==
Rd #	Pick #	Player	Nat	Pos	Team (League)	Reg GP	Pl GP	Notes
1	20	Mike Wilson	(Canada)	D	Sudbury Wolves (OHL)	0	0	
2	46	Rick Girard	(Canada)	C	Swift Current Broncos (WHL)	0	0	
4	98	Dieter Kochan	(Canada)	G	Northern Michigan University (NCAA)	0	0	
5	124	Scott Walker	(Canada)	RW	Owen Sound Platers (OHL)	197	0	
6	150	Troy Creuer	(Canada)	D	Notre Dame Hounds (SJHL)	0	0	
7	176	Evgeny Babariko	(Russia)	RW	Torpedo Nizhny Novgorod (Russia)	0	0	
8	202	Sean Tallaire	(Canada)	RW	Lake Superior State University (NCAA)	0	0	
10	254	Bert Robertsson	(Sweden)	D	Sodertalje SK (Swe)	69	0	
11	280	Sergei Tkachenko	(Ukraine)	G	Hamilton Canucks (AHL)	0	0	

== 1994 Draft ==
Rd #	Pick #	Player	Nat	Pos	Team (League)	Reg GP	Pl GP	Notes
1	13	Mattias Ohlund	(Sweden)	D	Lulea HF (Sweden)	770	52	
2	39	Robb Gordon	(Canada)	C	Powell River Paper Kings (BCJHL)	4	0	
2	42	Dave Scatchard	(Canada)	C	Portland Winter Hawks (WHL)	179	0	
3	65	Chad Allan	(Canada)	D	Saskatoon Blades (WHL)	0	0	
4	92	Mike Dubinsky	(Canada)	RW	Brandon Wheat Kings (WHL)	0	0	
5	117	Yanick Dube	(Canada)	C	Laval Titan (QMJHL)	0	0	
7	169	Yuri Kuznetsov	(Russia)	C	Avangard Omsk (Russia)	0	0	
8	195	Rob Trumbley	(Canada)	RW	Moose Jaw Warriors (WHL)	0	0	
9	221	Bill Muckalt	(Canada)	W	University of Michigan (NCAA)	106	0	
10	247	Tyson Nash	(Canada)	LW	Kamloops Blazers (WHL)	0	0	
11	273	Robert Longpre	(Canada)	C	Medicine Hat Tigers (WHL)	0	0	

== 1995 Draft ==
Rd #	Pick #	Player	Nat	Pos	Team (League)	Reg GP	Pl GP	Notes
2	40	Chris McAllister	(Canada)	D	Saskatoon Blades (WHL)	64	0	
3	61	Larry Courville	(Canada)	LW	Oshawa Generals (OHL)	33	0	
3	63	Peter Schaefer	(Canada)	LW	Brandon Wheat Kings (WHL)	194	3	
4	92	Lloyd Shaw	(Canada)	D	Seattle Thunderbirds (WHL)	0	0	
5	120	Todd Norman	(Canada)	LW	Guelph Storm (OHL)	0	0	
6	144	Brent Sopel	(Canada)	D	Swift Current Broncos (WHL)	322	42	
7	170	Stu Bodtker	(Canada)	C	Colorado College (NCAA)	0	0	
8	196	Tyler Willis	(Canada)	RW	Swift Current Broncos (WHL)	0	0	
9	222	Jason Cugnet	(Canada)	G	Kelowna Spartans (BCJHL)	0	0	

== 1996 Draft ==
Rd #	Pick #	Player	Nat	Pos	Team (League)	Reg GP	Pl GP	Notes
1	12	Josh Holden	(Canada)	C	Regina Pats (WHL)	46	0	
3	75	Zenith Komarniski	(Canada)	D	Tri-City Americans (WHL)	19	0	
4	93	Jonas Soling	(Sweden)	RW	Huddinge IK (Sweden)	0	0	
5	121	Tyler Prosofsky	(Canada)	RW	Kelowna Rockets (WHL)	0	0	
6	147	Nolan McDonald	(Canada)	G	University of Vermont (NCAA)	0	0	
7	175	Clint Cabana	(Canada)	D	Medicine Hat Tigers (WHL)	0	0	
8	201	Jeff Scissons	(Canada)	C	Vernon Vipers (BCJHL)	0	0	
9	227	Lubomir Vaic	(Slovakia)	C	HC Kosice (Slovakia)	9	0	

== 1997 Draft ==
Rd #	Pick #	Player	Nat	Pos	Team (League)	Reg GP	Pl GP	Notes
1	10	Brad Ference	(Canada)	D	Spokane Chiefs (WHL)	0	0	
2	34	Ryan Bonni	(Canada)	D	Saskatoon Blades (WHL)	3	0	
2	36	Harold Druken	(Canada)	C	Detroit Whalers (OHL)	118	4	
3	64	Kyle Freadrich	(Canada)	LW	Regina Pats (WHL)	0	0	
4	90	Chris Stanley	(Canada)	C	Belleville Bulls (OHL)	0	0	
5	114	David Darguzas	(Canada)	LW	Edmonton Ice (WHL)	0	0	
5	117	Matt Cockell	(Canada)	G	Saskatoon Blades (WHL)	0	0	
6	144	Matt Cooke	(Canada)	LW	Windsor Spitfires (OHL)	566	32	
6	148	Larry Shapley	(Canada)	RW	Peterborough Petes (OHL)	0	0	
7	171	Rod Leroux	(Canada)	D	Seattle Thunderbirds (WHL)	0	0	
8	201	Denis Martynyuk	(Austria)	LW	CSKA Moscow (Russia)	0	0	
9	227	Peter Brady	(Canada)	G	Powell River Paper Kings (BCJHL)	0	0	

== 1998 Draft ==
Rd #	Pick #	Player	Nat	Pos	Team (League)	Reg GP	Pl GP	Notes
1	4	Bryan Allen	(Canada)	D	Oshawa Generals (OHL)	216	7	
2	31	Artem Chubarov	(Russia)	C	CSKA Moscow (Russia)	228	27	
3	68	Jarkko Ruutu	(Finland)	LW	HIFK (Finland)	267	24	
3	81	Justin Morrison	(United States)	RW	Colorado College (NCAA)	0	0	
4	90	Regan Darby	(Canada)	D	Tri-City Americans (WHL)	0	0	
5	136	David Jonsson	(Sweden)	RW	Leksands IF (Sweden)	0	0	
5	140	Rick Bertran	(Canada)	D	Kitchener Rangers (OHL)	0	0	
6	149	Paul Cabana	(Canada)	RW	Fort McMurray Oil Barons (AJHL)	0	0	
7	177	Vince Malts	(United States)	RW	Hull Olympiques (QMJHL)	0	0	
8	204	Graig Mischler	(United States)	C	Northeastern University (NCAA)	0	0	
8	219	Curtis Valentine	(United States)	LW	Bowling Green State University (NCAA)	0	0	
9	232	Jason Metcalfe	(Canada)	D	London Knights (OHL)	0	0	

== 1999 Draft ==
Rd #	Pick #	Player	Nat	Pos	Team (League)	Reg GP	Pl GP	Notes
1	2	Daniel Sedin	(Sweden)	LW	Modo Hockey (Sweden)	1306	96	Won Art Ross Trophy and Ted Lindsay Award in 2011. Won King Clancy Memorial Trophy in 2018.inducted into Hockey Hall of Fame in 2022 #22 retired by the Canucks
1	3	Henrik Sedin	(Sweden)	C	Modo Hockey (Sweden)	1330	105	Won Art Ross and Hart Trophies in 2010. Won King Clancy Memorial Trophy in 2016 and 2018. .inducted into Hockey Hall of Fame in 2022 #33 retired by the Canucks
3	69	Rene Vydareny	(Slovakia)	D	Slovan Bratislava (Slovakia)	0	0	
5	129	Ryan Thorpe	(Canada)	LW	Spokane Chiefs (WHL)	0	0	
6	172	Josh Reed	(Canada)	D	Vernon Vipers (BCHL)	0	0	
7	189	Kevin Swanson	(Canada)	G	Kelowna Rockets (WHL)	0	0	
8	218	Markus Kankaanpera	(Finland)	D	JYP (Finland)	0	0	
9	271	Darrell Hay	(Canada)	D	Tri-City Americans (WHL)	0	0	

== 2000 Draft ==
Rd #	Pick #	Player	Nat	Pos	Team (League)	Reg GP	Pl GP	Notes
1	23	Nathan Smith	(Canada)	C	Swift Current Broncos (WHL)	4	4	
3	71	Thatcher Bell	(Canada)	C	Rimouski Oceanic (QMJHL)	0	0	
3	93	Tim Branham	(United States)	D	Barrie Colts (OHL)	0	0	
5	144	Pavel Duma	(Canada)	F	Neftekhimik Nizhnekamsk (Russia)	0	0	
7	208	Brandon Reid	(Canada)	C	Halifax Mooseheads (QMJHL)	13	10	
8	241	Nathan Barrett	(Canada)	C	Lethbridge Hurricanes (WHL)	0	0	
9	272	Tim Smith	(Canada)	C	Spokane Chiefs (WHL)	0	0	

== 2001 Draft ==
Rd #	Pick #	Player	Nat	Pos	Team (League)	Reg GP	Pl GP	Notes
1	16	R. J. Umberger	(United States)	C	Ohio State University (NCAA)	0	0	
3	66	Fedor Fedorov	(Russia)	C	Sudbury Wolves (OHL)	15	0	
4	114	Evgeny Gladskikh	(Russia)	RW	Metallurg Magnitogorsk (Russia)	0	0	
5	151	Kevin Bieksa	(Canada)	D	Bowling Green State University (NCAA)	597	71	
7	212	Jason King	(Canada)	LW	Halifax Mooseheads (QMJHL)	55	1	
8	245	Konstantin Mikhailov	(Russia)	F	Neftekhimik Nizhnekamsk (Russia)	0	0	

== 2002 Draft ==
Rd #	Pick #	Player	Nat	Pos	Team (League)	Reg GP	Pl GP	Notes
2	49	Kirill Koltsov	(Russia)	D	Avangard Omsk (Russia)	0	0	
2	55	Denis Grot	(Russia)	D	Elemash Elektrostal (Russia)	0	0	
3	68	Brett Skinner	(Canada)	D	Des Moines Buccaneers (USHL)	0	0	
3	83	Lukas Mensator	(Czech Republic)	G	HC Energie Karlovy Vary (Czech Republic)	0	0	
4	114	John Laliberte	(United States)	F	Boston University (NCAA)	0	0	
5	151	Rob McVicar	(Canada)	G	Brandon Wheat Kings (WHL)	1	0	
7	214	Marc-Andre Roy	(Canada)	LW	Baie-Comeau Drakkar (QMJHL)	0	0	
7	223	Ilya Krikunov	(Russia)	F	Elemash Elektrostal (Russia)	0	0	
8	247	Matt Violin	(Canada)	G	Lake Superior State University (NCAA)	0	0	
9	277	Thomas Nussli	(Switzerland)	F	EV Zug (Switzerland)	0	0	
9	278	Matt Gens	(United States)	RW	St. Cloud State University (NCAA)	0	0	

== 2003 Draft ==
Rd #	Pick #	Player	Nat	Pos	Team (League)	Reg GP	Pl GP	Notes
1	23	Ryan Kesler	(United States)	C	Ohio State University (NCAA)	655	57	Won Frank J. Selke Trophy in 2011
2	60	Marc-Andre Bernier	(Canada)	RW	Halifax Mooseheads (QMJHL)	0	0	
4	111	Brandon Nolan	(Canada)	C	Oshawa Generals (OHL)	0	0	
4	128	Ty Morris	(Canada)	LW	St. Albert Saints (AJHL)	0	0	
5	160	Nicklas Danielsson	(Sweden)	LW	Brynas IF (Sweden)	0	0	
6	190	Chad Brownlee	(Canada)	D	Vernon Vipers (BCHL)	0	0	
7	222	Francois-Pierre Guenette	(Canada)	C	Halifax Mooseheads (QMJHL)	0	0	
8	252	Sergei Topol	(Russia)	F	Avangard Omsk (Russia)	0	0	
8	254	Nathan McIver	(Canada)	D	Toronto St. Michael's Majors (OHL)	18	0	
9	285	Matthew Hansen	(Canada)	D	Seattle Thunderbirds (WHL)	0	0	

== 2004 Draft ==
Rd #	Pick #	Player	Nat	Pos	Team (League)	Reg GP	Pl GP	Notes
1	26	Cory Schneider	(United States)	G	Phillips Academy (USHS–MA)	98	10	Won William M. Jennings Trophy in 2011 (shared with Roberto Luongo)
3	91	Alexander Edler	(Sweden)	D	Jamtland (Sweden)	925	82	
4	125	Andrew Sarauer	(Canada)	LW	Langley Hornets (BCHL)	0	0	
5	159	Mike Brown	(United States)	RW	University of Michigan (NCAA)	39	0	
6	189	Julien Ellis	(Canada)	G	Shawinigan Cataractes (QMJHL)	0	0	
8	254	David Schulz	(Canada)	D	Swift Current Broncos (WHL)	0	0	
9	287	Jannik Hansen	(Denmark)	LW	Malmo Jr (Sweden)	565	64	

== 2005 Draft ==
Rd #	Pick #	Player	Nat	Pos	Team (League)	Reg GP	Pl GP	Notes
1	10	Luc Bourdon	(Canada)	D	Val-d'Or Foreurs (QMJHL)	36	0	Died May 2008, while on roster #28 taken out of circulation by the Canucks
2	51	Mason Raymond	(Canada)	W	Camrose Kodiaks (AJHL)	374	55	
4	114	Alexandre Vincent	(Canada)	G	Chicoutimi Sagueneens (QMJHL)	0	0	
5	138	Matt Butcher	(Canada)	C	Chilliwack Chiefs (BCHL)	0	0	
6	185	Kris Fredheim	(Canada)	D	Notre Dame Hounds (SJHL)	0	0	
7	205	Mario Bliznak	(Slovakia)	C	Dukla Trenčín (Slovakia)	6	0	

== 2006 Draft ==
Rd #	Pick #	Player	Nat	Pos	Team (League)	Reg GP	Pl GP	Notes
1	14	Michael Grabner	(Austria)	RW	Spokane Chiefs (WHL)	20	9	
3	82	Daniel Rahimi	(Sweden)	D	IF Bjorkloven (Sweden)	0	0	
6	163	Sergei Shirokov	(Russia)	W	CSKA Moscow (Russia)	8	0	
6	167	Juraj Simek	(Slovakia)	W	Kloten Flyers (Switzerland)	0	0	
7	197	Evan Fuller	(Canada)	C	Prince George Cougars (WHL)	0	0	

== 2007 Draft ==
Rd #	Pick #	Player	Nat	Pos	Team (League)	Reg GP	Pl GP	Notes
1	25	Patrick White	(United States)	C	Tri-City Storm (USHL)	0	0	
2	33	Taylor Ellington	(Canada)	D	Everett Silvertips (WHL)	0	0	
5	145	Charles-Antoine Messier	(Canada)	C	Baie-Comeau Drakkar (QMJHL)	0	0	
5	146	Ilya Kablukov	(Russia)	W	CSKA Moscow (Russia)	0	0	
6	176	Taylor Matson	(United States)	C	Des Moines Buccaneers (USHL)	0	0	
7	206	Dan Gendur	(Canada)	RW	Everett Silvertips (WHL)	0	0	

== 2008 Draft ==
Rd #	Pick #	Player	Nat	Pos	Team (League)	Reg GP	Pl GP	Notes
1	10	Cody Hodgson	(Canada)	C	Brampton Battalion (OHL)	71	12	
2	41	Yann Sauve	(Canada)	D	Saint John Sea Dogs (QMJHL)	8	0	
5	131	Prab Rai	(Canada)	C	Seattle Thunderbirds (WHL)	0	0	
6	161	Mats Froshaug	(Norway)	C	Linkopings HC Jr. (Sweden)	0	0	
7	191	Morgan Clark	(Canada)	G	Red Deer Rebels (WHL)	0	0	

== 2009 Draft ==
Rd #	Pick #	Player	Nat	Pos	Team (League)	Reg GP	Pl GP	Notes
1	22	Jordan Schroeder	(United States)	C	University of Minnesota (NCAA)	56	0	
2	53	Anton Rodin	(Sweden)	W	Brynas IF (J20 SuperElit)	3	0	
3	83	Kevin Connauton	(Canada)	D	Western Michigan University (NCAA)	0	0	
4	113	Jeremy Price	(Canada)	D	Nepean Raiders (CJHL)	0	0	
5	143	Peter Andersson	(Sweden)	D	Frolunda HC (Sweden)	0	0	
6	173	Joe Cannata	(United States)	G	Merrimack College (NCAA)	0	0	
7	187	Steven Anthony	(Canada)	LW	Saint John Sea Dogs (QMJHL)	0	0	

== 2010 Draft ==
Rd #	Pick #	Player	Nat	Pos	Team (League)	Reg GP	Pl GP	Notes
4	115	Patrick McNally	United States	D	Milton Academy (USHS–MA)	0	0	
5	145	Adam Polasek	Czech Republic	D	P.E.I. Rocket (QMJHL)	0	0	
6	172	Alex Friesen	Canada	C	Niagara IceDogs (OHL)	1	0	
6	175	Jonathan Iilahti	Finland	G	Espoo Blues (Finland)	0	0	
7	205	Sawyer Hannay	Canada	D	Halifax Mooseheads (QMJHL)	0	0	

== 2011 Draft ==
Rd #	Pick #	Player	Nat	Pos	Team (League)	Reg GP	Pl GP	Notes
1	29	Nicklas Jensen	Denmark	LW	Oshawa Generals (OHL)	24	0	
3	71	David Honzík	Czech Republic	G	Victoriaville Tigres (QMJHL)	0	0	
3	90	Alexandre Grenier	Canada	RW	Halifax Mooseheads (QMJHL)	9	0	
4	101	Joseph LaBate	United States	C	Academy of Holy Angels (USHS–MN)	14	0	
4	120	Ludwig Blomstrand	Sweden	LW	Djurgardens IF (J20 SuperElit)	0	0	
5	150	Frank Corrado	Canada	D	Sudbury Wolves (OHL)	28	4	
6	180	Pathrik Westerholm	Sweden	C	Malmo Redhawks (J20 SuperElit)	0	0	
7	210	Henrik Tommernes	Sweden	D	Frolunda HC (J20 SuperElit)	0	0	

== 2012 Draft ==
Rd #	Pick #	Player	Nat	Pos	Team (League)	Reg GP	Pl GP	Notes
1	26	Brendan Gaunce	Canada	C	Belleville Bulls (OHL)	117	0	
2	57	Alexandre Mallet	Canada	LW	Rimouski Oceanic (QMJHL)	0	0	
5	147	Ben Hutton	Canada	D	Nepean Raiders (CCHL)	276	0	
6	177	Wesley Myron	Canada	LW	Victoria Grizzlies (BCHL)	0	0	
7	207	Matthew Beattie	United States	C	Phillips Exeter Academy (USHS–NH)	0	0	

== 2013 Draft ==
Rd #	Pick #	Player	Nat	Pos	Team (League)	Reg GP	Pl GP	Notes
1	9	Bo Horvat	Canada	C	London Knights (OHL)	621	23	Captained the Canucks from 2019 to 2023.
1	24	Hunter Shinkaruk	Canada	LW	Medicine Hat Tigers (WHL)	1	0	
3	85	Cole Cassels	United States	C	Oshawa Generals (OHL)	0	0	
4	115	Jordan Subban	Canada	D	Belleville Bulls (OHL)	0	0	
5	145	Anton Cederholm	Sweden	D	Rogle BK (SHL)	0	0	
6	175	Mike Williamson	Canada	D	Spruce Grove Saints (AJHL)	0	0	
7	205	Miles Liberati	United States	D	London Knights (OHL)	0	0	

== 2014 Draft ==
Rd #	Pick #	Player	Nat	Pos	Team (League)	Reg GP	Pl GP	Notes
1	6	Jake Virtanen	Canada	RW	Calgary Hitmen (WHL)	317	16	
1	24	Jared McCann	Canada	C	Sault Ste. Marie Greyhounds (OHL)	69	0	
2	36	Thatcher Demko	United States	G	Boston College (NCAA D1)	262	4	
3	66	Nikita Tryamkin	Russia	D	Avtomobilist Yekaterinburg (KHL)	79	0	
5	126	Gustav Forsling	Sweden	D	Linkopings HC (SHL)	0	0	
6	156	Kyle Pettit	Canada	C	Erie Otters (OHL)	0	0	
7	186	Mackenze Stewart	Canada	D	Prince Albert Raiders (WHL)	0	0	

== 2015 Draft ==
Rd #	Pick #	Player	Nat	Pos	Team (League)	Reg GP	Pl GP	Notes
1	23	Brock Boeser	United States	RW	Waterloo Black Hawks (USHL)	629	17	
3	66	Guillaume Brisebois	Canada	D	Acadie–Bathurst Titan (QMJHL)	30	0	
4	114	Dmitri Zhukenov	Russia	C	Avangard Omsk 2 (Russia Jr.)	0	0	
5	144	Carl Neill	Canada	D	Sherbrooke Phoenix (QMJHL)	0	0	
5	149	Adam Gaudette	United States	C	Cedar Rapids RoughRiders (USHL)	153	10	
6	174	Lukas Jasek	Czech Republic	RW	HC Ocelari Trinec (Czech Extraliga)	0	0	
7	210	Tate Olson	Canada	D	Prince George Cougars (WHL)	0	0	

== 2016 Draft ==
Rd #	Pick #	Player	Nat	Pos	Team (League)	Reg GP	Pl GP	Notes
1	5	Olli Juolevi	Finland	D	London Knights (OHL)	23	1	
3	64	William Lockwood	United States	RW	U.S. NTDP (USHL)	28	0	
5	140	Cole Candella	Canada	D	Hamilton Bulldogs (OHL)	0	0	
6	154	Jakob Stukel	Canada	LW	Calgary Hitmen (WHL)	0	0	
7	184	Rodrigo Abols	Latvia	C	Portland Winterhawks (WHL)	0	0	
7	194	Brett McKenzie	Canada	C/LW	North Bay Battalion (OHL)	0	0	

== 2017 Draft ==
Rd #	Pick #	Player	Nat	Pos	Team (League)	Reg GP	Pl GP	Notes
1	5	Elias Pettersson	Sweden	C	Timra IK (HockeyAllsvenskan)	545	30	Won Calder Memorial Trophy in 2019
2	33	Kole Lind	Canada	RW	Kelowna Rockets (WHL)	7	0	
2	55	Jonah Gadjovich	Canada	LW	Owen Sound Attack (OHL)	1	0	
3	64	Michael DiPietro	Canada	G	Windsor Spitfires (OHL)	3	0	
4	95	Jack Rathbone	United States	D	Harvard University (NCAA)	28	0	
5	135	Kristoffer Gunnarsson	Sweden	D	Frolunda HC (SHL)	0	0	
6	181	Petrus Palmu	Finland	LW/RW	Owen Sound Attack (OHL)	0	0	
7	188	Matthew Brassard	Canada	D	Oshawa Generals (OHL)	0	0	

== 2018 Draft ==
Rd #	Pick #	Player	Nat	Pos	Team (League)	Reg GP	Pl GP	Notes
1	7	Quinn Hughes	United States	D	University of Michigan (NCAA)	459	30	Became captain of the Canucks in 2023. Won the James Norris Memorial Trophy in 2024.
2	37	Jett Woo	Canada	D	Moose Jaw Warriors (WHL)	0	0	
3	68	Tyler Madden	United States	C	Northeastern University (NCAA)	0	0	
5	130	Toni Utunen	Finland	D	Tappara (Liiga)	0	0	
6	186	Artyom Manukyan	Russia	F	Avangard Omsk (Russia)	0	0	
7	192	Matthew Thiessen	Canada	G	Steinbach Pistons (CJHL)	0	0	

== 2019 Draft ==
Rd #	Pick #	Player	Nat	Pos	Team (League)	Reg GP	Pl GP	Notes
1	10	Vasily Podkolzin	Russia	RW	SKA-Neva (VHL)	137	2	
2	40	Nils Hoglander	Sweden	LW	Rogle (SHL)	331	11	
4	122	Ethan Keppen	Canada	LW	Flint Firebirds (OHL)	0	0	
5	133	Carson Focht	Canada	C	Calgary Hitmen (WHL)	0	0	
6	156	Arturs Silovs	Latvia	G	HS Riga (Latvia)	19	10	
6	175	Karel Plasek	Czech Republic	LW/RW	HC Kometa Brno (Czech)	0	0	
6	180	John Malone	United States	F	Youngstown Phantoms (USHL)	0	0	
7	195	Aidan McDonough	United States	F	Cedar Rapids RoughRiders (USHL)	6	0	
7	215	Arvid Costmar	Sweden	C	Linkopings HC (SHL)	0	0	

== 2020 Draft ==
Rd #	Pick #	Player	Nat	Pos	Team (League)	Reg GP	Pl GP	Notes
3	82	Joni Jurmo	Finland	D	Jokerit U20	0	0	
4	113	Jackson Kunz	United States	LW	Shattuck-St. Mary's High School (Minnesota)	0	0	
5	144	Jacob Truscott	United States	D	U.S. NTDP U-18	0	0	
6	175	Dmitry Zlodeyev	Russia	C	Dynamo Moscow 2 (Russia Jr)	0	0	
7	191	Viktor Persson	Sweden	D	Kamloops Blazers (WHL)	0	0	

== 2021 Draft ==
Rd #	Pick #	Player	Nat	Pos	Team (League)	Reg GP	Pl GP	Notes
2	41	Danila Klimovich	Belarus	RW	Dinamo Zubry (Vysshaya Liga)	0	0	
5	137	Aku Koskenvuo	Finland	G	HIFK U20 (U20 SM-sarja)	0	0	
5	140	Jonathan Myrenberg	Sweden	D	Sollentuna HC (Hockeyettan)	0	0	
6	169	Hugo Gabrielson	Sweden	D	Frolunda U20 (J20 SuperElit)	0	0	
6	178	Connor Lockhart	Canada	RW	Erie Otters (OHL)	0	0	
7	201	Lucas Forsell	Sweden	LW	Farjestad U20 (J20 SuperElit)	0	0	

== 2022 Draft ==
Rd #	Pick #	Player	Nat	Pos	Team (League)	Reg GP	Pl GP	Notes
1	15	Jonathan Lekkerimäki	Sweden	RW	Djurgardens IF (J20 SuperElit)	37	0	
3	80	Elias Pettersson	Sweden	D	Örebro HK (SHL)	98	0	
4	112	Daimon Gardner	Canada	C	Warroad High	0	0	
5	144	Ty Young	Canada	G	Prince George Cougars (WHL)	0	0	
6	176	Jackson Dorrington	United States	D	Des Moines Buccaneers (USHL)	0	0	
7	208	Kirill Kudryavtsev	Russia	D	Sault Ste. Marie Greyhounds (OHL)	2	0	

== 2023 Draft ==
Rd #	Pick #	Player	Nat	Pos	Team (League)	Reg GP	Pl GP	Notes
1	11	Tom Willander	Sweden	D	Rogle BK (J20 Nationell)	70	0	
3	75	Hunter Brzustewicz	United States	D	Kitchener Rangers (OHL)		0	
3	89	Sawyer Mynio	Canada	D	Seattle Thunderbirds (WHL)	0	0	
4	105	Ty Mueller	Canada	C	University of Nebraska-Omaha (NCAA)	8	0	
4	107	Vilmer Alriksson	Sweden	LW	Djurgårdens IF J20 (J20 Nationell)	0	0	
4	119	Matthew Perkins	Canada	C	University of Minnesota-Duluth (NCAA)	0	0	
6	171	Aiden Celebrini	Canada	D	Boston University (NCAA)	0	0	

== 2024 Draft ==
Rd #	Pick #	Player	Nat	Pos	Team (League)	Reg GP	Pl GP	Notes
3	93	Melvin Fernstrom	Sweden	RW	Orebro HK (J20 Nationell)	0	0	
4	125	Riley Patterson	Canada	C	Barrie Colts (OHL)	0	0	
6	162	Anthony Romani	Canada	RW	North Bay Battalion (OHL)	0	0	
6	189	Parker Alcos	Canada	D	Edmonton Oil Kings (WHL)	0	0	
7	221	Basile Sansonnens	Switzerland	D	HC Fribourg-Gottéron (U20-Elit)	0	0	

== 2025 Draft ==
Rd #	Pick #	Player	Nat	Pos	Team (League)	Reg GP	Pl GP	Notes
1	15	Braeden Cootes	Canada	C	Seattle Thunderbirds (WHL)	3	0	
2	47	Alexei Medvedev	Russia	G	London Knights (OHL)	0	0	
3	65	Kieren Dervin	Canada	C	St. Andrew's College (U18 AAA/PHC)	0	0	
5	143	Wilson Björck	Sweden	C	Djurgårdens IF J20 (J20 Nationell)	0	0	
6	175	Gabriel Chiarot	Canada	RW	Brampton Steelheads (OHL)	0	0	
7	207	Matthew Lansing	United States	C	Fargo Force (USHL)	0	0	

== 2026 Draft ==
Rd #	Pick #	Player	Nat	Pos	Team (League)	Reg GP	Pl GP	Notes
1	3	Caleb Malhotra	Canada	C	Brantford Bulldogs (OHL)	0	0	
1	24	Adam Novotný	Czech Republic	LW	Peterborough Petes (OHL)	0	0	
2	33	Brooks Rogowski	United States	C	Oshawa Generals (OHL)	0	0	
2	41	Niklas Aaram-Olsen	Norway	RW	Orebro HK (SHL)	0	0	
3	78	Dmitri Ivchenko	Russia	G	Omskie Yastreby (MHL)	0	0	
4	97	Yaroslav Bryzgalov	Belarus	LW	Medicine Hat Tigers (WHL)	0	0	
5	129	Connor Davis	Canada	RW	Cedar Rapids RoughRiders (USHL)	0	0	
6	176	Lucian Bernat	Slovakia	RW	Tappara U20 (U20 SM-sarja)	0	0	
6	184	Samuel Eriksson	Sweden	D	Färjestad BK U20 (J20 Nationell)	0	0	

== Notes ==
- ^{a} Rick Lanz was born in Czechoslovakia but defected to Canada in 1968.
- ^{b} Petr Nedved was born in Czechoslovakia but defected to Canada in 1989.
