= Alek Stojanov =

Canadian ice hockey player

- Born: April 25, 1973 (age 53) Windsor, Ontario, Canada
- Height: 6 ft 4 in (193 cm)
- Weight: 230 lb (104 kg; 16 st 6 lb)
- Position: Right wing
- Shot: Left
- Played for: Vancouver Canucks; Pittsburgh Penguins
- NHL draft: 7th overall, 1991; Vancouver Canucks
- Playing career: 1992–2002

Alexander Stojanov (born April 25, 1973) is a Canadian former professional ice hockey player who spent three seasons in the National Hockey League (NHL). He is best known for his trade from Vancouver to Pittsburgh in exchange for Markus Näslund, in what is recognized as one of the most lopsided trades in the history of the NHL. Selected seventh overall in the 1991 NHL entry draft, he is now widely regarded as a draft bust.

== Playing career ==
Born in Windsor, Ontario, Stojanov was a first round selection of the Vancouver Canucks in the 1991 NHL Entry Draft, chosen one selection after future superstar Peter Forsberg was taken by the Philadelphia Flyers. The 6'4" Stojanov had crafted a fearsome reputation in junior hockey, and impressed scouts by pummeling the much-hyped Eric Lindros in a fight during their draft year. He also possessed a soft pair of hands and a nice scoring touch around the net, scoring 25 goals for the Hamilton Dukes, and earned comparisons to Bob Probert, considered the NHL's top enforcer at the time.

Stojanov's Duke team then relocated to Guelph and became the Storm where he had an injury-plagued 1991–92 campaign. Stojanov's club went 4–51–11 in what amounted to an expansion team, however, the first rounder only played in 33 of 66 games that season.

In 1992–93, Stojanov was traded midway through the season to the Newmarket Royals for Ryan Vanden Bussche, Mike Prokopec and a draft choice. Stojanov collected 55 points in 35 games as the rebuilding Storm moved the then 19-year-old for youth. He played parts of the 1992–93 season in Guelph with 16-year-old rookie, Jeff O'Neill and sophomore Todd Bertuzzi.

At the conclusion of the season, he turned pro and joined the Hamilton Canucks, Vancouver's American Hockey League affiliate, and impressed by scoring four goals in his first four games. However, he sustained a shoulder injury that required major surgical reconstruction, and he missed almost the entire 1993–94 campaign as a result, and never again showed the offensive touch he had earlier in his career.

In 1994–95, Stojanov recorded 18 goals and 270 penalty minutes for the Syracuse Crunch, and earned himself a four-game callup to the NHL. He was also kept on Vancouver's roster for the NHL playoffs, and appeared in the first five playoff games of his career.

For the 1995–96 campaign, Stojanov cracked the Canucks' roster full-time as the team's enforcer, appearing in 58 games and recording a single assist. A notable event during this season was a fight with Kelly Chase of the Hartford Whalers. However, at the trade deadline, Stojanov was dealt to the Pittsburgh Penguins in exchange for Markus Näslund. He scored his first NHL goal in his Penguin debut, and finished the year with a goal and two points in 68 games between Vancouver and Pittsburgh, along with 130 penalty minutes.

In 1996–97, Stojanov spent the entire year in Pittsburgh, but appeared in only 35 games, recording one goal and four assists for five points along with 79 penalty minutes. By the 1997–98 season, he found himself back in the AHL, assigned to the Penguins' farm team in Syracuse, and he never played in the NHL again.

Released by Pittsburgh in 1998, Stojanov toiled for two more years in the International Hockey League and then for two years with the New Mexico Scorpions of the Central Hockey League before retiring in 2002. He finished his NHL career with totals of two goals and five assists for seven points in 107 NHL games, along with 222 penalty minutes.

While Stojanov was considered a major disappointment for a seventh overall pick during his time in Vancouver, he is now best known as the player dealt for Markus Näslund. Näslund later became captain of the Canucks, and became the club's all-time leading scorer, remaining with the team more than a decade after the trade.

== Career statistics ==
			Regular season					Playoffs
Season	Team	League	GP	G	A	Pts	PIM	GP	G	A	Pts	PIM
1988–89	Windsor Riversides	Midget	26	19	15	34	53	—	—	—	—	—
1988–89	Belle River Canadiens	GLJCHL	7	3	2	5	42	—	—	—	—	—
1988–89	Amherstburg Vikings	GLJCHL	1	0	0	0	2	—	—	—	—	—
1989–90	Hamilton Dukes	OHL	37	4	4	8	91	—	—	—	—	—
1990–91	Hamilton Dukes	OHL	62	25	20	45	179	4	1	1	2	14
1991–92	Guelph Storm	OHL	33	12	15	27	91	—	—	—	—	—
1992–93	Newmarket Royals	OHL	14	9	7	16	21	7	1	3	4	26
1992–93	Guelph Storm	OHL	35	27	28	55	11	—	—	—	—	—
1992–93	Hamilton Canucks	AHL	4	4	0	4	0	—	—	—	—	—
1993–94	Hamilton Canucks	AHL	4	0	1	1	5	—	—	—	—	—
1994–95	Syracuse Crunch	AHL	73	18	12	30	270	—	—	—	—	—
1994–95	Vancouver Canucks	NHL	4	0	0	0	13	5	0	0	0	2
1995–96	Vancouver Canucks	NHL	58	0	1	1	123	—	—	—	—	—
1995–96	Pittsburgh Penguins	NHL	10	1	0	1	7	9	0	0	0	19
1996–97	Pittsburgh Penguins	NHL	35	1	4	5	79	—	—	—	—	—
1997–98	Syracuse Crunch	AHL	41	5	4	9	215	3	1	0	1	4
1998–99	Milwaukee Admirals	IHL	13	0	1	1	58	—	—	—	—	—
1998–99	Detroit Vipers	IHL	27	1	3	4	91	—	—	—	—	—
1998–99	Hamilton Bulldogs	AHL	12	0	1	1	35	—	—	—	—	—
1999–2000	Detroit Vipers	IHL	43	4	10	14	135	—	—	—	—	—
2000–01	New Mexico Scorpions	WPHL	36	10	16	26	131	—	—	—	—	—
2001–02	New Mexico Scorpions	CHL	28	10	6	16	98	—	—	—	—	—
AHL totals			134	27	18	45	525	3	1	0	1	4
NHL totals			107	2	5	7	222	14	0	0	0	21

Preceded by Shawn Antoski	Vancouver Canucks first-round draft pick 1991	Succeeded by Libor Polasek
