= Rural Municipality of Redberry No. 435 =

Rural municipality in Saskatchewan, Canada

Redberry No. 435
- Rural municipality
- Rural Municipality of Redberry No. 435
- Location of the RM of Redberry No. 435 in Saskatchewan
- Coordinates: 52.776°N 107.273°W
- Country: Canada
- Province: Saskatchewan
- Census division: 16
- SARM division: 5
- Formed: January 1, 1913

Government
  - Reeve: Les Welkie
  - Governing body: RM of Redberry No. 435 Council
  - Administrator: Mark Misquitta
  - Office location: Hafford

Area (2016)
  - Land: 1,015.2 km^{2} (392.0 sq mi)

Population (2016)
  - Total: 342
  - Density: 0.3/km^{2} (0.78/sq mi)
- Time zone: CST
  - Summer (DST): CST
- Area codes: 306 and 639

The Rural Municipality of Redberry No. 435 (2016 population: 342) is a rural municipality (RM) in the Canadian province of Saskatchewan within Census Division No. 16 and SARM Division No. 5.

== History ==
The RM of Redberry No. 435 incorporated as a rural municipality on January 1, 1913.

== Geography ==
=== Communities and localities ===
The following urban municipalities are surrounded by the RM.

Towns

- Hafford

Villages

- Krydor

The following unincorporated communities are within the RM.

Localities

- Orolow
- Redberry
- Redberry Park

== Demographics ==
Population history (1981–2016)
Year	Pop.	±%
1981	715	—
1986	667	−6.7%
1991	584	−12.4%
1996	464	−20.5%
2001	461	−0.6%
2006	451	−2.2%
2011	372	−17.5%
2016	342	−8.1%
Source: Statistics Canada via Saskatchewan Bureau of Statistics

In the 2021 Census of Population conducted by Statistics Canada, the RM of Redberry No. 435 had a population of 372 living in 154 of its 184 total private dwellings, a change of 8.8% from its 2016 population of 342. With a land area of 1,003.09 km^{2} (387.30 sq mi), it had a population density of 0.4/km^{2} (1.0/sq mi) in 2021.

In the 2016 Census of Population, the RM of Redberry No. 435 recorded a population of 342 living in 146 of its 181 total private dwellings, a −8.1% change from its 2011 population of 372. With a land area of 1,015.2 km^{2} (392.0 sq mi), it had a population density of 0.3/km^{2} (0.9/sq mi) in 2016.

== Attractions ==
- Redberry Lake Regional Park
- Redberry Lake National Migratory Bird Sanctuary
- Redberry Lake Biosphere Region Interpretive Site

== Government ==
The RM of Redberry No. 435 is governed by an elected municipal council and an appointed administrator that meets on the second Tuesday of every month. The reeve of the RM is Les Welkie while its administrator is Darrin Beaudoin. The RM's office is located in Hafford.

== Transportation ==
- Saskatchewan Highway 40
- Saskatchewan Highway 340
- Saskatchewan Highway 685
- Saskatchewan Highway 781
- Canadian Pacific Railway (abandoned)
- Hafford Airport

== See also ==
- List of rural municipalities in Saskatchewan
