= Saskatchewan Highway 340 =

Provincial highway in Saskatchewan, Canada

Highway 340

Route information
- Maintained by Ministry of Highways and Infrastructure
- Length: 30.4 km (18.9 mi)

Major junctions
- South end: Highway 16 (TCH/YH) at Radisson
- North end: Highway 40 at Hafford

Location
- Country: Canada
- Province: Saskatchewan
- Rural municipalities: Great Bend, Redberry

Highway system
- Provincial highways in Saskatchewan
| ← Highway 339 | → Highway 342 |

Highway 340 is a provincial highway in the Canadian province of Saskatchewan. It runs from Highway 16 at Radisson to Highway 40 at Hafford and intersects Highway 685. It is about 30 kilometres (19 mi) long.

== Route description ==
Hwy 340 begins in the Rural Municipality of Great Bend No. 405 in the northeastern corner town of Radisson at an intersection with the Yellowhead Highway (Hwy 16), with the road continuing into town as Richard Avenue. It slowly curves due northward, quickly leaving Radisson and travelling through rural prairie lands for several kilometres, where it crosses a causeway over the eastern reaches of Radisson Lake, to enter the Rural Municipality of Redberry No. 435. The highway now has an intersection with Township Road 420 (provides access to Redberry Park) as it continues on through rural areas, having a junction with Hwy 685 and traversing a switchback to cross Marshy Creek and enter the town of Hafford along 2nd Street W, passing through neighbourhoods along the western side of town before crossing a former railway line and coming to an end at a junction with Hwy 40, with the road continuing north as Range Road 3102. The entire length of Hwy 340 is a paved, two-lane highway.

== Major intersections ==
From south to north:

| Rural municipality | Location | km | mi | Destinations | Notes |
|---|---|---|---|---|---|
| Great Bend No. 405 | Radisson | 0.0 | 0.0 | Highway 16 (TCH/YH) – Saskatoon, The Battlefords; Richard Avenue – Radisson | Southern terminus; road continues west as Richard Avenue |
| Great Bend No. 405 | Radisson | 0.06 | 0.037 | Rider Pride Road – Radisson Airport | |
| Great Bend No. 405 | | 2.8– 3.4 | 1.7– 2.1 | Causeway across Radisson Lake | |
| Great Bend No. 405 | | 3.9 | 2.4 | Rural Road – Radisson Lake access | |
| Redberry No. 435 | | 13.6 | 8.5 | Township Road 420 – Redberry Park | |
| Redberry No. 435 | | 23.3 | 14.5 | Highway 685 south – Petrofka Bridge, Borden | Northern terminus of Hwy 685 |
| Redberry No. 435 | Hafford | 30.5 | 19.0 | Highway 40 – The Battlefords, Blaine Lake, Redberry Lake Regional Park | Northern terminus; road continues north as Range Road 3102 |
1.000 mi = 1.609 km; 1.000 km = 0.621 mi

== See also ==
- Transportation in Saskatchewan
- Roads in Saskatchewan
