= Radisson, Saskatchewan =

Town in Saskatchewan, Canada

Radisson
- Town
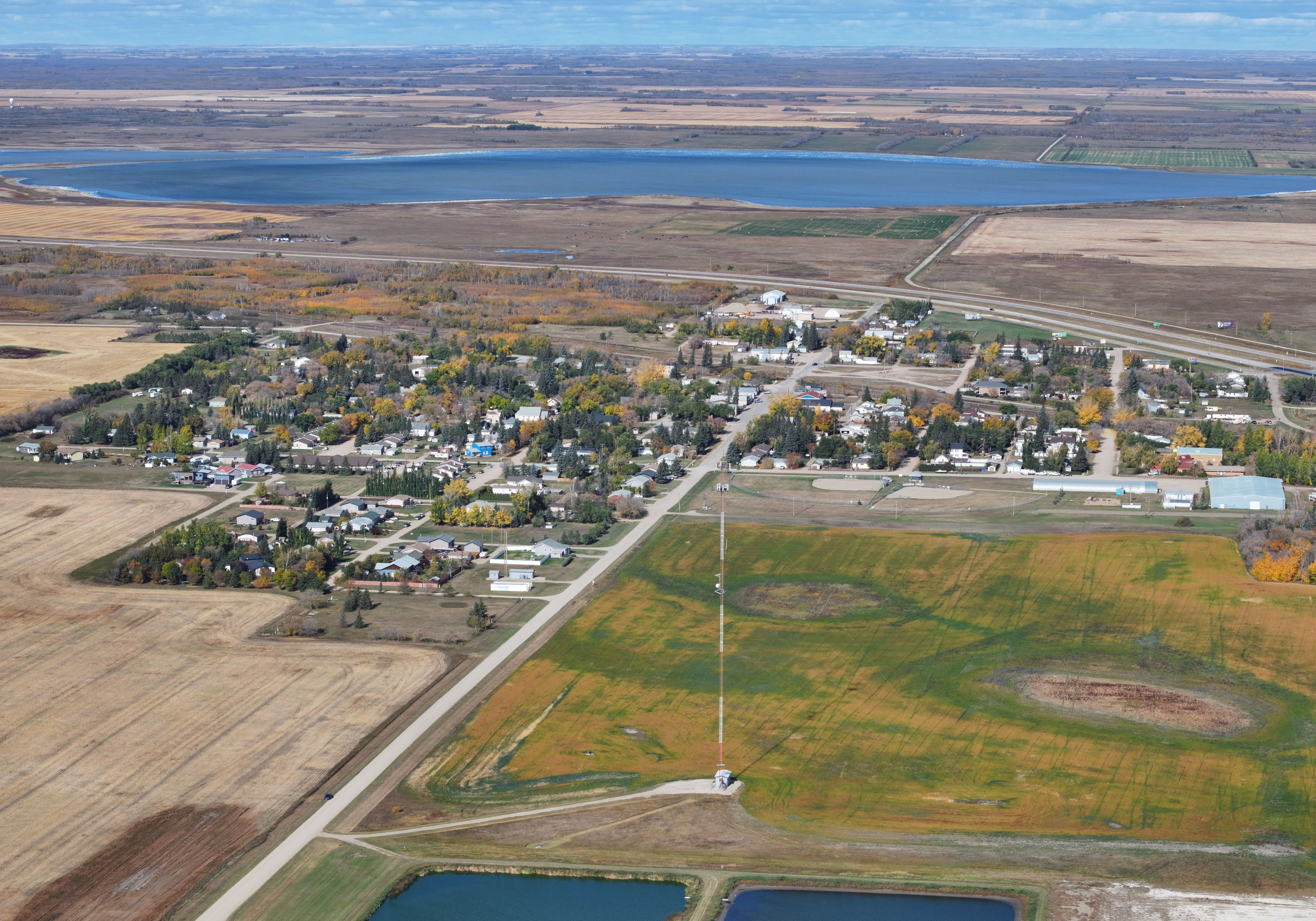
- Aerial view, 2025

- Location within Saskatchewan Location within Canada
- Coordinates: 52°27′47″N 107°23′44″W
- Country: Canada
- Province: Saskatchewan
- Census division: 16
- Founded: 1905
- Incorporated (village): 1906
- Incorporated (town): 1913

Government
  - Mayor: Duane Flath
  - Governing body: Radisson Town Council

Area (2021)
  - Total: 2.07 km^{2} (0.80 sq mi)
- Elevation: 525 m (1,722 ft)

Population (2021)
  - Total: 466
  - Density: 225.6/km^{2} (584/sq mi)
- Time zone: CST
- Postal code: S0K 3L0
- Area code: 306
- Highways: Highway 16 (TCH/YH) / Highway 340
- Website: radisson.ca

Radisson is a town in the province of Saskatchewan, Canada. It was named after Pierre-Esprit Radisson (1636–1710), an explorer who was instrumental in creating Hudson's Bay Company.

== Demographics ==
In the 2021 Canadian census conducted by Statistics Canada, Radisson had a population of 466 living in 231 of its 256 total private dwellings, a change of −9.3% from its 2016 population of 514. With a land area of 2.07 km^{2} (0.80 sq mi), it had a population density of 225.1/km^{2} (583.1/sq mi) in 2021.

Canada census – Radisson community profile

	2021	2011
Population	466 (-9.3% from 2016)	505 (20.0% from 2006)
Land area	2.07 km^{2} (0.80 sq mi)	2.07 km^{2} (0.80 sq mi)
Population density	225.6/km^{2} (584/sq mi)	243.6/km^{2} (631/sq mi)
Median age	50 (M: 48.4, F: 50.8)	46.9 (M: 47.3, F: 46.6)
Private dwellings	230 (total)	257 (total)
Median household income

References: 2021 2011

== Transportation ==
The community is served by Radisson Airport which is located adjacent to Radisson. The Yellowhead Highway (Hwy 16) passes through northeastern part of town, connecting it with Saskatoon and The Battlefords. Hwy 340 begins in Radisson and heads north past Radisson Lake to Hafford. The Canadian National Railway's Aberdeen Subdivision also travels through Raddison.

== Climate ==
Climate data for Radisson (Radisson 1) Climate ID: 4056381; coordinates 52°24′N 107°25′W; elevation: 520.0 m (1,706.0 ft); 1971–2000 normals
Month	Jan	Feb	Mar	Apr	May	Jun	Jul	Aug	Sep	Oct	Nov	Dec	Year
Record high °C (°F)	9.0 (48.2)	12.0 (53.6)	19.0 (66.2)	30.5 (86.9)	36.0 (96.8)	41.0 (105.8)	37.5 (99.5)	38.0 (100.4)	35.6 (96.1)	30.0 (86.0)	17.2 (63.0)	9.0 (48.2)	41.0 (105.8)
Mean daily maximum °C (°F)	−10.7 (12.7)	−8.1 (17.4)	0.6 (33.1)	10.3 (50.5)	19.3 (66.7)	23.3 (73.9)	25.1 (77.2)	24.1 (75.4)	18.1 (64.6)	11.1 (52.0)	−2.1 (28.2)	−10.1 (13.8)	8.5 (47.3)
Daily mean °C (°F)	−15.9 (3.4)	−13.5 (7.7)	−4.8 (23.4)	4.4 (39.9)	11.7 (53.1)	16.0 (60.8)	17.9 (64.2)	16.6 (61.9)	10.9 (51.6)	4.5 (40.1)	−6.8 (19.8)	−15.0 (5.0)	2.2 (36.0)
Mean daily minimum °C (°F)	−21.2 (−6.2)	−18.9 (−2.0)	−10.3 (13.5)	−2.5 (27.5)	4.1 (39.4)	8.6 (47.5)	10.6 (51.1)	9.1 (48.4)	3.8 (38.8)	−2.2 (28.0)	−11.5 (11.3)	−19.8 (−3.6)	−4.2 (24.4)
Record low °C (°F)	−42 (−44)	−41 (−42)	−34 (−29)	−26.7 (−16.1)	−8.0 (17.6)	−4.0 (24.8)	3.9 (39.0)	−2.0 (28.4)	−9.0 (15.8)	−26.0 (−14.8)	−34.0 (−29.2)	−44.0 (−47.2)	−44.0 (−47.2)
Average precipitation mm (inches)	14.1 (0.56)	10.3 (0.41)	15.6 (0.61)	31.9 (1.26)	53.0 (2.09)	59.3 (2.33)	72.5 (2.85)	46.0 (1.81)	36.6 (1.44)	19.2 (0.76)	18.7 (0.74)	16.1 (0.63)	393.2 (15.48)
Average rainfall mm (inches)	1.0 (0.04)	0.1 (0.00)	1.2 (0.05)	18.0 (0.71)	50.6 (1.99)	59.3 (2.33)	72.5 (2.85)	46.0 (1.81)	34.3 (1.35)	11.1 (0.44)	2.9 (0.11)	0.8 (0.03)	297.7 (11.72)
Average snowfall cm (inches)	13.0 (5.1)	10.2 (4.0)	14.7 (5.8)	13.9 (5.5)	2.4 (0.9)	0.0 (0.0)	0.0 (0.0)	0.0 (0.0)	2.3 (0.9)	8.1 (3.2)	15.7 (6.2)	15.3 (6.0)	95.7 (37.7)
Average precipitation days (≥ 0.2 mm)	4.9	3.9	3.8	5.4	7.5	7.9	9.1	7.8	5.8	4.1	4.5	6.0	70.7
Average rainy days (≥ 0.2 mm)	0.37	0.11	0.63	3.3	7.2	7.9	9.1	7.8	5.6	2.9	0.95	0.26	46.0
Average snowy days (≥ 0.2 cm)	4.6	3.8	3.4	2.7	0.53	0.0	0.0	0.0	0.45	1.6	3.7	5.8	26.5
Source: Environment and Climate Change Canada

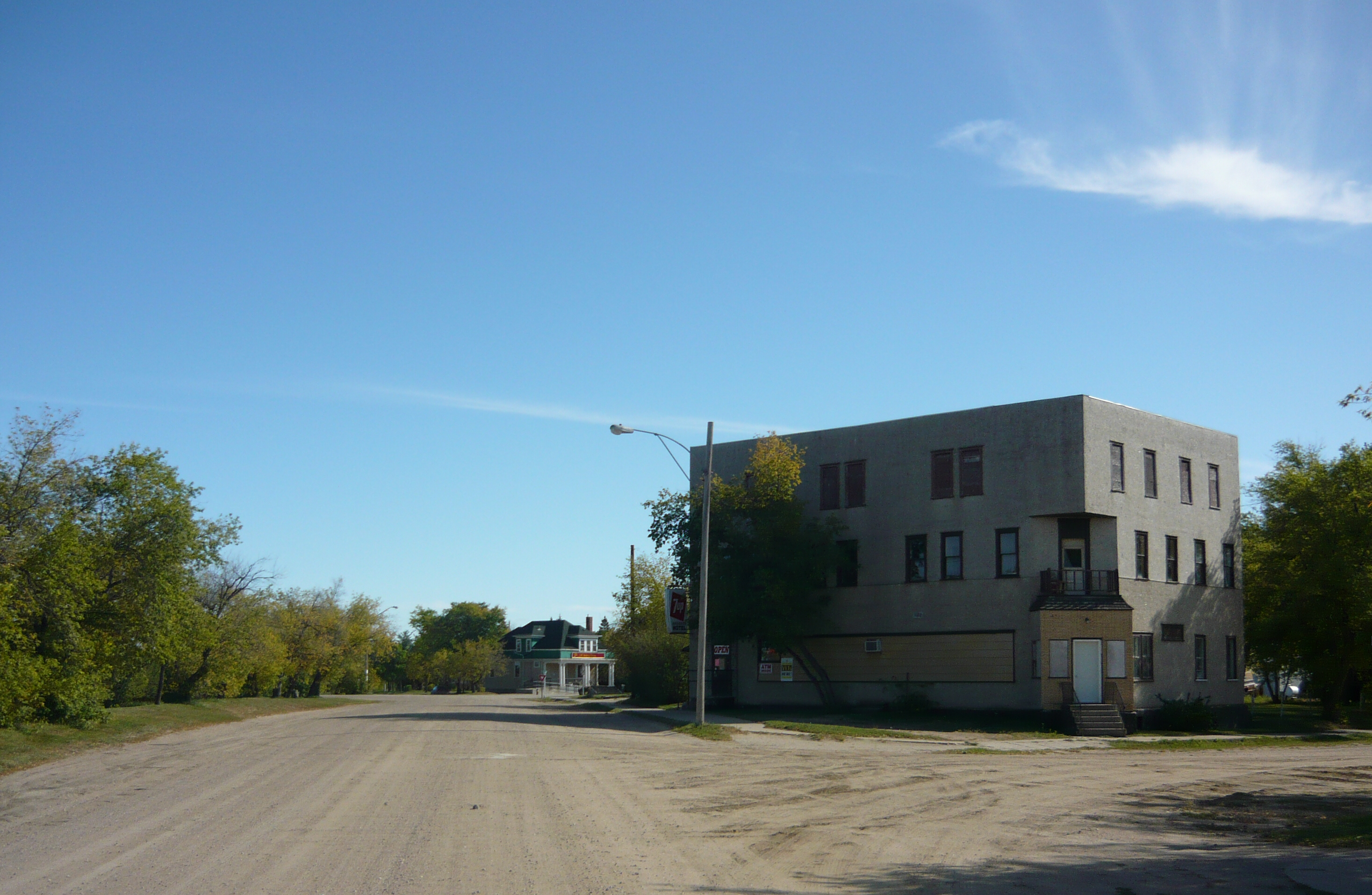
Radisson Hotel on Railway Avenue

== Notable people ==
- Bill Hajt, former ice hockey player

== See also ==
- List of communities in Saskatchewan
- List of francophone communities in Saskatchewan
- List of towns in Saskatchewan
- Radisson Lake
