= Jim Sandlak =

Canadian ice hockey player (born 1966)

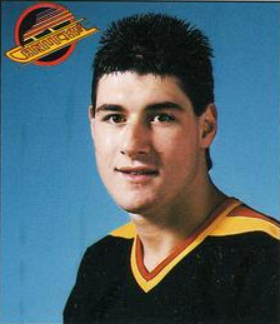
- 1987 card of Sandlak
- Born: December 12, 1966 (age 59) Kitchener, Ontario, Canada
- Height: 6 ft 4 in (193 cm)
- Weight: 220 lb (100 kg; 15 st 10 lb)
- Position: Right wing
- Shot: Right
- Played for: Vancouver Canucks; Hartford Whalers
- National team: Canada
- NHL draft: 4th overall, 1985; Vancouver Canucks
- Playing career: 1985–1998

James Sandlak Jr. (born December 12, 1966) is a Canadian former professional ice hockey player who spent 11 seasons in the National Hockey League and was known as "the House" due to his large stature.

== Playing career ==
Sandlak played major junior with the London Knights of the Ontario Hockey League (OHL). Heading into the 1985 NHL entry draft he was regarded as one of the top-rated players for the draft. He was selected by the Vancouver Canucks with the fourth overall pick; at 6'4" and 220 lbs he was chosen to address the Canucks' desire for a big scoring forward. He confirmed this status with a dominant performance at the 1986 World Junior Championships, at which he was the captain of the Canadian team and was named the tournament's top forward. Convinced that Sandlak was a better prospect than the slow-developing Cam Neely (who played the same position and style), Canuck management decided that Neely was expendable, and dealt him to the Boston Bruins for Barry Pederson in what would later be labelled by many commentators as one of the worst trades ever made.

Sandlak had a solid rookie year in 1986–87, scoring 15 goals and being selected to the NHL All-Rookie Team. After a poor training camp in 1987, he was sent to the AHL, but responded well upon his recall, scoring 16 goals in 49 games. He scored 20 goals the following season, but continued to struggle with comparisons to the superstar Neely and frustrate fans and management alike with his inconsistency. By the 1990–91 season he was getting less ice time on the Canucks, scoring just 7 goals.

However, Sandlak rebounded in 1991–92 to play the best hockey of his career on a rejuvenated Canuck team. Playing largely with Sergio Momesso and Cliff Ronning (a line dubbed the "Twin Towers" due to Ronning's small stature accentuating the size of his two larger linemates), Sandlak matched his career high of 40 points despite missing almost 20 games due to injury. In the 1992 playoffs, Sandlak finally put his game together and looked like the power forward he was always supposed to be, as he was arguably the best player in Vancouver's opening-round victory against Winnipeg, and contributed 10 points in that playoffs while playing a dominant physical game.

However, just as Sandlak's career appeared headed in the right direction, injuries began to take their toll. His 1992–93 season was plagued by back problems which caused him to miss 25 games as well as most of the playoffs, and limited him to just 10 goals. Following the season, he was dealt to the Hartford Whalers as the future considerations in the Murray Craven trade. His two seasons with the Whalers were an absolute nightmare, however, as wrist, foot, knee, and heel injuries limited him to just 40 games and 8 points over that span. Released by the Whalers in 1995, he returned to Vancouver for the 1995–96 season, but again struggled with injuries (this time a stress fracture to a vertebra in his back) and his level of play had dropped off considerably. Following a failed tryout with Buffalo the following season he retired from the NHL, although he returned after a year off for a season in Germany before leaving the game for good.

Sandlak finished his career with totals of 110 goals and 229 points in 549 career games, along with 821 penalty minutes.

== Awards and achievements ==
- Named top forward at the 1986 World Junior Ice Hockey Championships
- Won silver medal at 1986 World Junior Championships
- Named to 1986–87 NHL All-Rookie Team

== Career statistics ==
=== Regular season and playoffs ===
			Regular season					Playoffs
Season	Team	League	GP	G	A	Pts	PIM	GP	G	A	Pts	PIM
1982–83	Kitchener Rangers	OHL	1	0	0	0	0	—	—	—	—	—
1983–84	London Knights	OHL	68	23	18	41	143	8	1	11	12	13
1984–85	London Knights	OHL	58	40	24	64	128	8	3	2	5	14
1985–86	Vancouver Canucks	NHL	23	1	3	4	10	3	0	1	1	0
1985–86	London Knights	OHL	16	7	13	20	36	5	2	3	5	24
1986–87	Vancouver Canucks	NHL	78	15	21	36	66	—	—	—	—	—
1987–88	Vancouver Canucks	NHL	49	16	15	31	81	—	—	—	—	—
1987–88	Fredericton Express	AHL	24	10	15	25	47	—	—	—	—	—
1988–89	Vancouver Canucks	NHL	72	20	20	40	99	6	1	1	2	2
1989–90	Vancouver Canucks	NHL	70	15	8	23	104	—	—	—	—	—
1990–91	Vancouver Canucks	NHL	59	7	6	13	125	—	—	—	—	—
1991–92	Vancouver Canucks	NHL	66	16	24	40	176	13	4	6	10	22
1992–93	Vancouver Canucks	NHL	59	10	18	28	122	6	2	2	4	4
1993–94	Hartford Whalers	NHL	27	6	2	8	32	—	—	—	—	—
1994–95	Hartford Whalers	NHL	13	0	0	0	0	—	—	—	—	—
1995–96	Vancouver Canucks	NHL	33	4	2	6	6	5	0	0	0	2
1995–96	Syracuse Crunch	AHL	12	6	1	7	16	—	—	—	—	—
1997–98	ERC Ingolstadt	DEU II	18	6	9	15	85	3	0	1	1	2
NHL totals			549	110	119	229	821	33	7	10	17	30

=== International ===
Year	Team	Event	GP	G	A	Pts	PIM
1985	Canada	WJC	5	1	0	1	6
1986	Canada	WJC	7	5	7	12	16
Junior totals			12	6	7	13	22

== Coaching ==
Sandlak was an assistant coach with the Sarnia Sting of the OHL in 2007-2008.

Preceded by J. J. Daigneault	Vancouver Canucks first-round draft pick 1985	Succeeded by Dan Woodley
