= Dan Woodley =

American ice hockey player (born 1967)

- Born: December 29, 1967 (age 58) Oklahoma City, Oklahoma, U.S.
- Height: 6 ft 0 in (183 cm)
- Weight: 200 lb (91 kg; 14 st 4 lb)
- Position: Center
- Shot: Right
- Played for: Vancouver Canucks
- NHL draft: 7th overall, 1986; Vancouver Canucks
- Playing career: 1987–1995

Dan Woodley (born December 29, 1967) is an American former professional ice hockey player who played in the National Hockey League for the Vancouver Canucks during the 1987–88 NHL season. Selected 7th overall by the Canucks in the 1986 NHL entry draft, Woodley turned professional in 1987. After his time in the NHL, he played in various minor leagues before retiring in 1995.

== Playing career ==
Woodley was born in Oklahoma City, Oklahoma. He was selected 7th overall in the 1986 NHL entry draft by the Canucks. He helped the Portland Winter Hawks to the 1986 Memorial Cup Finals. He turned pro in 1987–88 and had a solid season, recording 66 points in 69 IHL games and scoring 2 goals in 5 games with the Canucks.

However, after Pat Quinn replaced general manager Jack Gordon, Woodley was sent to Milwaukee to start the 1988–89 season in the IHL. He was traded in a swap of first-round picks, to the Montreal Canadiens in exchange for Jose Charbonneau. He finished the year in Sherbrooke, Quebec on the first-place Canadiens farm team with 18 goals. Following two more mediocre seasons for Montreal, he requested to be bought out in 1991. He then moved to the ECHL and played four more seasons before retiring in 1995.

Woodley's lack of success (5 games played 2 goals) was surprising, given his high place in the 1986 draft. No player who was drafted higher than Woodley in the 1980s played fewer than his 5 NHL games, and he was one of only three top-10 picks (Jason Herter and Dan Gratton being the others) to play fewer than 10 NHL games. In contrast, future Hockey Hall of Fame defender Brian Leetch, was selected 2 picks later than Woodley by the New York Rangers.

== Post-playing career ==
In 2007 Woodley became the Regis Jesuit High School, in Aurora, Colorado, varsity team. In his third year with the team, the 2007–2008 Regis Jesuit HS team posted an overall record of 20-1-1 and captured the state high school championship with a double-overtime 3–2 victory. The Regis team went undefeated in 2008–2009 to win their second consecutive state championship. In 2012 Woodley's team captured their third state title under his guidance going 22–1. Woodley coached Regis Jesuit hockey to the state final four for five consecutive years and built Regis Jesuit into a hockey powerhouse in the state. Woodley also coached a youth hockey team in Colorado.

== Personal life ==
Woodley is the son of Dave Woodley, who was playing for the Oklahoma City Blazers of the Central Hockey League when Dan was born. Dan Woodley has the distinction of being the only Oklahoma native ever selected in the first round of the NHL draft. He spent his early childhood in places such as Oklahoma, Arizona, and Oregon (while his father was playing minor league pro hockey) as well as in Victoria, British Columbia, where he learned to play junior hockey. Woodley lives in Denver, Colorado with his family.

== Career statistics ==
			Regular season					Playoffs
Season	Team	League	GP	G	A	Pts	PIM	GP	G	A	Pts	PIM
1983–84	Summerland Buckaroos	BCHL	54	17	34	51	111	—	—	—	—	—
1983–84	Portland Winterhawks	WHL	6	1	2	3	2	8	1	3	4	4
1984–85	Portland Winterhawks	WHL	63	21	36	57	108	1	0	0	0	0
1985–86	Portland Winterhawks	WHL	62	45	47	92	100	12	0	8	8	31
1986–87	Portland Winterhawks	WHL	47	30	50	80	81	19	19	17	36	52
1987–88	Vancouver Canucks	NHL	5	2	0	2	17	—	—	—	—	—
1987–88	Flint Spirits	IHL	69	29	37	66	104	9	1	3	4	26
1988–89	Milwaukee Admirals	IHL	30	9	12	21	48	—	—	—	—	—
1988–89	Sherbrooke Canadiens	AHL	30	9	16	25	69	4	1	6	7	5
1989–90	Sherbrooke Canadiens	AHL	65	18	40	58	144	10	1	6	7	58
1990–91	Fredericton Canadiens	AHL	4	0	0	0	4	—	—	—	—	—
1990–91	Kansas City Blades	IHL	20	6	4	10	30	—	—	—	—	—
1990–91	Albany Choppers	IHL	31	8	17	25	36	—	—	—	—	—
1991–92	Winston-Salem Thunderbirds	ECHL	57	24	42	66	102	5	3	3	6	2
1992–93	Flint Bulldogs	CoHL	39	20	36	56	112	6	4	7	11	21
1993–94	Muskegon Fury	CoHL	58	43	58	101	217	1	0	0	0	0
1994–95	Muskegon Fury	CoHL	43	25	26	51	87	—	—	—	—	—
1994–95	Saginaw Wheels	CoHL	11	11	4	15	18	2	1	1	2	24
NHL totals			5	2	0	2	17	—	—	—	—	—
IHL totals			150	52	70	122	218	9	1	3	4	26
CoHL totals			151	99	124	223	434	9	5	8	13	45

== Awards ==
- 1987–88: Ken McKenzie Trophy

Awards and achievements
Preceded by Jim Sandlak	Vancouver Canucks first-round draft pick 1986	Succeeded by Trevor Linden
