= Hafford =

Town in Saskatchewan, Canada

Hafford, Saskatchewan
- Town
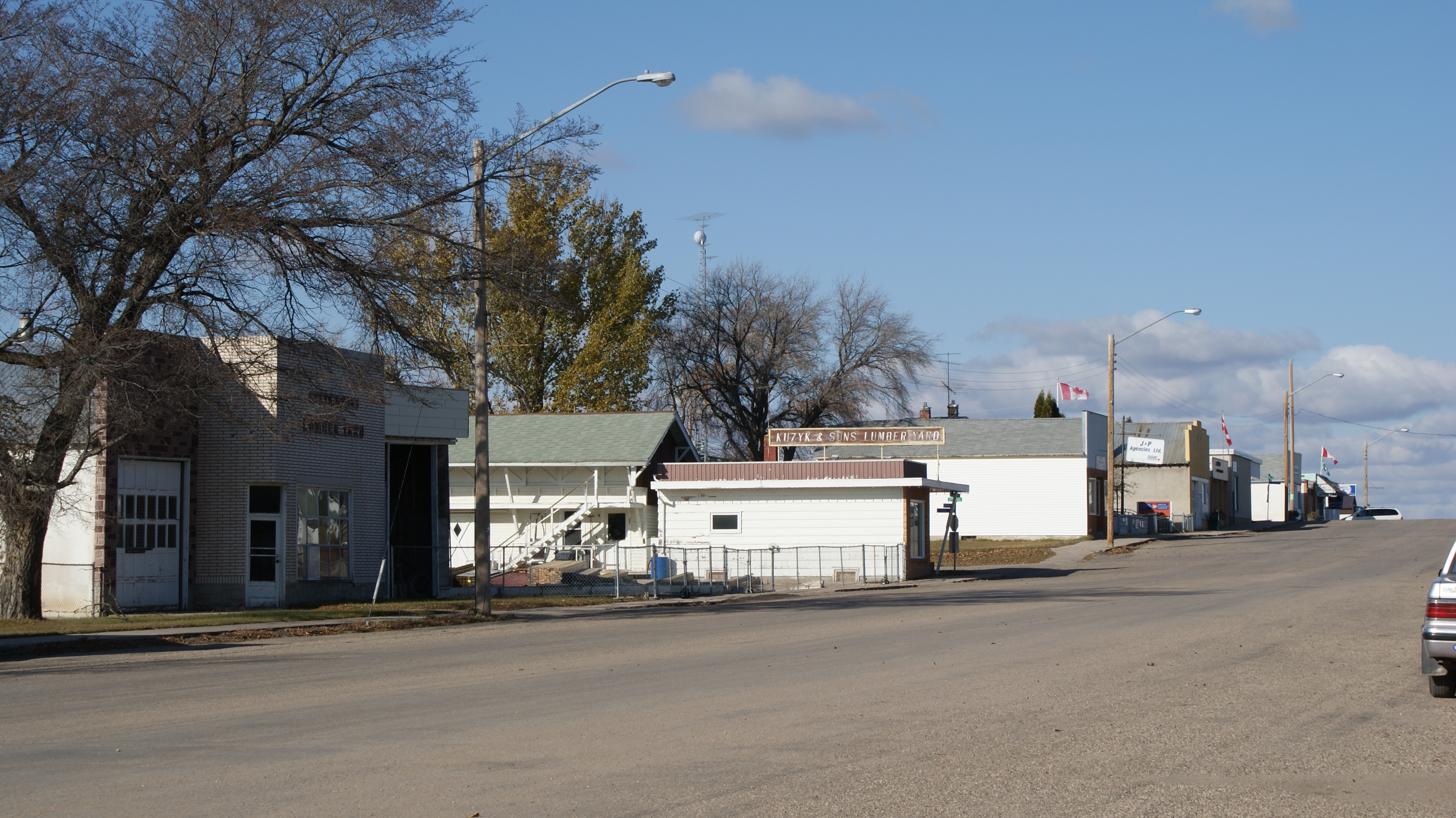
- Main Street Hafford

- Location of Hafford in Saskatchewan Hafford, Saskatchewan (Canada)
- Coordinates: 52.842°N 107.382°W
- Country: Canada
- Province: Saskatchewan
- Census division: 16
- Rural municipality: Redberry No. 435
- Incorporated (Village): 1913
- Incorporated (Town): 1 January 1981

Government
  - Mayor: Victoria Moses
  - Governing body: Hafford Town Council
  - MLA, Rosthern-Shellbrook: Scott Moe (2020)
  - MP, Carlton Trail—Eagle Creek: Kelly Block (2021)

Area
  - Total: 1.13 km^{2} (0.44 sq mi)

Population (2021)
  - Total: 414
  - Density: 366.4/km^{2} (949/sq mi)
- Time zone: CST
- Postal code: S0J 1A0
- Area codes: 306, 639
- Highways: Highway 40; Highway 340
- Railways: Carlton Trail Railway

Hafford is a town in the RM of Redberry, Saskatchewan, Canada, consisting of 414 residents at the 2021 Canadian census. It is near the salt water Redberry Lake.

== History ==
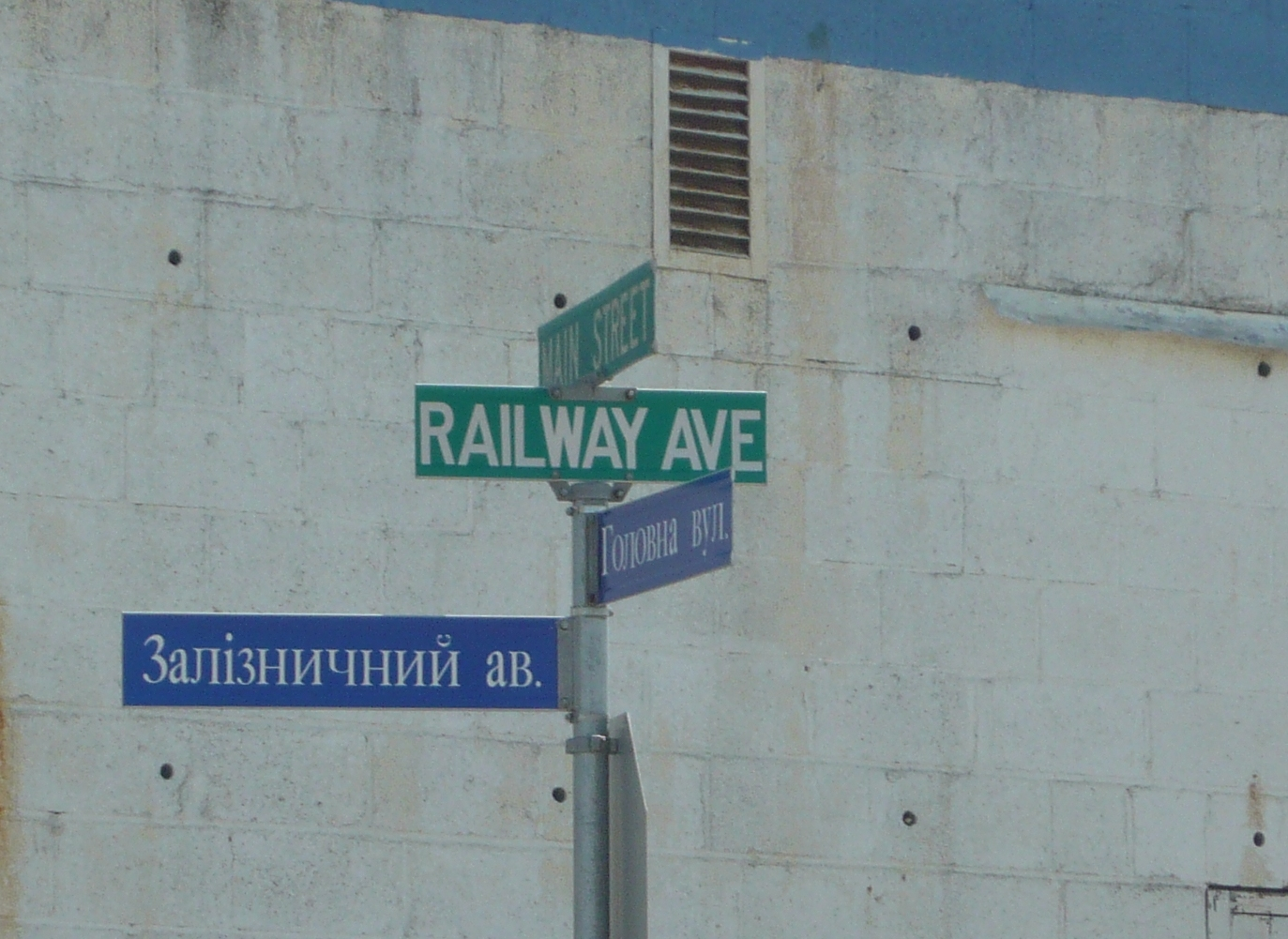
Bilingual street sign

The first overseer for the village of Hafford was T.G. Bavin in 1914. The Hafford Village Council and Board of Trade requested a doctor, and Dr. Whitemarsh was appointed for the village. The early community was first served by Luxembourg Post Office. The early village had three lumber yards, a general store, I.H.C. agency, a poolroom, livery barn, hardware, and post office. In 1913 the Canadian Bank of Commerce and the first restaurant opened. The hotel and bar were established in 1914. Power came to Hafford in 1916, and the Hafford Rural Telephone Company was established in 1916. The Hafford hospital was built in 1922. Hafford was served by the Ukrainian Catholic Church established 1911, the Ukrainian Orthodox church built 1909, the Roman Catholic Church erected about the same time. The Anglican church was built in 1918, and the Methodist church which was erected in Hafford moved to Richard. The Dominion Government Illustration Station was operated between 1932 and 1955. This station tested grains, and fertilizers and improved livestock.

== Demographics ==
In the 2021 Census of Population conducted by Statistics Canada, Hafford had a population of 414 living in 190 of its 221 total private dwellings, a change of 1.7% from its 2016 population of 407. With a land area of 1.13 km^{2} (0.44 sq mi), it had a population density of 366.4/km^{2} (948.9/sq mi) in 2021.

== Education ==
The Hafford community was served firstly by the Whiteberry School District which constructed their school building over two years 1906–1908, opening in 1909 followed by the Rus School District opening 1910. In this area, the Alberton School District, Gooseberry School District, Slawa School District and the Craigmore School District were all organised in 1912. The Hafford School District and Nauka School Districts were organised in 1914, Langley School District 1916, and both the Lost Lake School District, and the Canada School District in 1918.

== Transportation ==
Historically, the railroad connecting Prince Albert and North Battleford was laid in 1913, and upon the rail line, a site was chosen for the village of Hafford site. The community is served by Hafford Airport which is located 1 nautical mile (1.9 km) northwest and formerly by the now removed Carlton Trail Railway that ran parallel to Highway 40.

== Climate ==
Climate data for Hafford
Month	Jan	Feb	Mar	Apr	May	Jun	Jul	Aug	Sep	Oct	Nov	Dec	Year
Record high °C (°F)	9.5 (49.1)	8.5 (47.3)	18 (64)	30.6 (87.1)	35 (95)	37.5 (99.5)	36.5 (97.7)	37 (99)	33 (91)	29.4 (84.9)	18.9 (66.0)	8 (46)	37.5 (99.5)
Mean daily maximum °C (°F)	−11.9 (10.6)	−9.3 (15.3)	−1.4 (29.5)	9.9 (49.8)	18.1 (64.6)	21.9 (71.4)	23.9 (75.0)	23.4 (74.1)	16.7 (62.1)	9.9 (49.8)	−3.3 (26.1)	−10.8 (12.6)	7.3 (45.1)
Daily mean °C (°F)	−17 (1)	−14.5 (5.9)	−6.9 (19.6)	3.7 (38.7)	11 (52)	15.1 (59.2)	17.2 (63.0)	16.2 (61.2)	10.1 (50.2)	3.7 (38.7)	−7.7 (18.1)	−15.7 (3.7)	1.3 (34.3)
Mean daily minimum °C (°F)	−22.2 (−8.0)	−19.7 (−3.5)	−12.2 (10.0)	−2.5 (27.5)	3.9 (39.0)	8.3 (46.9)	10.4 (50.7)	9 (48)	3.4 (38.1)	−2.6 (27.3)	−12.1 (10.2)	−20.5 (−4.9)	−4.7 (23.5)
Record low °C (°F)	−46.7 (−52.1)	−42.8 (−45.0)	−37.2 (−35.0)	−28.3 (−18.9)	−9.4 (15.1)	−3.5 (25.7)	0.6 (33.1)	−3.5 (25.7)	−9 (16)	−24 (−11)	−36 (−33)	−43 (−45)	−46.7 (−52.1)
Average precipitation mm (inches)	13.7 (0.54)	8.1 (0.32)	13.2 (0.52)	23.1 (0.91)	50.7 (2.00)	67.5 (2.66)	79.3 (3.12)	38.4 (1.51)	39.2 (1.54)	14.8 (0.58)	13.9 (0.55)	14.2 (0.56)	375.9 (14.80)
Source: Environment Canada

== Notable people ==
- Sonia Scurfield, the second woman (and the only Canadian woman) to have her name engraved on the Stanley Cup
- Allen B. Sulatycky, former Associate Chief Justice of the Court of Queen's Bench of Alberta
- Jason Herter, former professional hockey player, played one game with the NHL's New York Islanders
- Vivian Prokop, named for three consecutive years in the WXN Top 100 Most Powerful Women in Canada and recipient of a 2013 Queen Elizabeth ll Diamond Jubilee Medal

== See also ==
- List of communities in Saskatchewan
- List of towns in Saskatchewan
- Crooked Trees
