= Mike Wilson (ice hockey) =

Canadian ice hockey player (born 1975)

- Born: February 26, 1975 (age 51) Brampton, Ontario, Canada
- Height: 6 ft 6 in (198 cm)
- Weight: 230 lb (104 kg; 16 st 6 lb)
- Position: Defence
- Shot: Left
- Played for: Buffalo Sabres; Florida Panthers; Pittsburgh Penguins; New York Rangers
- NHL draft: 20th overall, 1993; Vancouver Canucks
- Playing career: 1995–2011

Michael R. Wilson (born February 26, 1975) is a Canadian former professional ice hockey defenceman. Wilson was drafted 20th overall by the Vancouver Canucks in the 1993 NHL entry draft. He played 336 career NHL games, scoring 16 goals and 41 assists for 57 points.

== Playing career ==
Between 1995 and 2003, Wilson played 336 games in the National Hockey League (NHL) with the Buffalo Sabres, Florida Panthers, Pittsburgh Penguins, and New York Rangers. Wilson played the next two seasons in Europe splitting time between Norway, Finland, Switzerland and Austria. Wilson subsequently returned to hockey late in the 2008-09 Season to play for the Trenton Devils of the ECHL. He was given the opportunity by a friend who worked within the organization. He played the final five games of the regular season and the first round of the playoffs, with the team losing in the first round. Wilson returned to the ECHL late in the following season with the Toledo Walleye, again playing a small number of regular season games but no playoff games. He would continue this trend the following season with the games that he played at the end of the regular season being the last of his playing career.

During the 2004–05 season Wilson played for the Storhamar Dragons of the Norwegian UPC league, scoring one goal and two assists in 23 regular season and playoff games.

== Career statistics ==
| | | | Regular season | | | | | Playoffs |
| Season | Team | League | GP | G | A | Pts | PIM | GP | G | A | Pts | PIM |
|---|---|---|---|---|---|---|---|---|---|---|---|---|
| 1991–92 | Georgetown Raiders | CJHL | 41 | 9 | 13 | 22 | 65 | — | — | — | — | — |
| 1992–93 | Sudbury Wolves | OHL | 53 | 6 | 7 | 13 | 58 | 14 | 1 | 1 | 2 | 21 |
| 1993–94 | Sudbury Wolves | OHL | 60 | 4 | 22 | 26 | 62 | 9 | 1 | 3 | 4 | 8 |
| 1994–95 | Sudbury Wolves | OHL | 64 | 13 | 34 | 47 | 46 | 18 | 1 | 8 | 9 | 10 |
| 1995–96 | Buffalo Sabres | NHL | 58 | 4 | 8 | 12 | 41 | — | — | — | — | — |
| 1995–96 | Rochester Americans | AHL | 15 | 0 | 5 | 5 | 38 | — | — | — | — | — |
| 1996–97 | Buffalo Sabres | NHL | 77 | 2 | 9 | 11 | 51 | 10 | 0 | 1 | 1 | 2 |
| 1997–98 | Buffalo Sabres | NHL | 66 | 4 | 4 | 8 | 48 | 15 | 0 | 1 | 1 | 13 |
| 1998–99 | Buffalo Sabres | NHL | 30 | 1 | 2 | 3 | 47 | — | — | — | — | — |
| 1998–99 | Florida Panthers | NHL | 4 | 0 | 0 | 0 | 0 | — | — | — | — | — |
| 1998–99 | Las Vegas Thunder | IHL | 6 | 3 | 1 | 4 | 6 | — | — | — | — | — |
| 1999–2000 | Florida Panthers | NHL | 60 | 4 | 16 | 20 | 35 | 4 | 0 | 0 | 0 | 0 |
| 2000–01 | Florida Panthers | NHL | 19 | 0 | 1 | 1 | 25 | — | — | — | — | — |
| 2000–01 | Louisville Panthers | AHL | 4 | 0 | 2 | 2 | 5 | — | — | — | — | — |
| 2001–02 | Pittsburgh Penguins | NHL | 21 | 1 | 1 | 2 | 17 | — | — | — | — | — |
| 2001–02 | Wilkes–Barre/Scranton Penguins | AHL | 46 | 3 | 9 | 12 | 59 | — | — | — | — | — |
| 2002–03 | Wilkes–Barre/Scranton Penguins | AHL | 45 | 4 | 5 | 9 | 89 | — | — | — | — | — |
| 2002–03 | New York Rangers | NHL | 1 | 0 | 0 | 0 | 0 | — | — | — | — | — |
| 2002–03 | Hartford Wolf Pack | AHL | 5 | 1 | 2 | 3 | 5 | — | — | — | — | — |
| 2003–04 | Springfield Falcons | AHL | 45 | 3 | 8 | 11 | 28 | — | — | — | — | — |
| 2004–05 | Storhamar Dragons | NOR | 16 | 0 | 2 | 2 | 12 | 7 | 1 | 0 | 0 | 2 |
| 2005–06 | EHC Black Wings Linz | AUT | 17 | 1 | 2 | 3 | 18 | — | — | — | — | — |
| 2005–06 | EHC Basel | NLA | 6 | 0 | 0 | 0 | 14 | — | — | — | — | — |
| 2005–06 | Ilves | SM-l | 22 | 2 | 1 | 3 | 68 | 3 | 0 | 0 | 0 | 10 |
| 2008–09 | Trenton Devils | ECHL | 5 | 1 | 2 | 3 | 0 | 5 | 1 | 0 | 1 | 4 |
| 2009–10 | Toledo Walleye | ECHL | 2 | 0 | 1 | 1 | 2 | — | — | — | — | — |
| 2010–11 | Toledo Walleye | ECHL | 3 | 1 | 0 | 1 | 2 | — | — | — | — | — |
| NHL totals | | | 336 | 16 | 41 | 57 | 264 | 29 | 0 | 2 | 2 | 15 |
| AHL totals | | | 160 | 11 | 31 | 42 | 224 | — | — | — | — | — |

== Personal life ==
Wilson resides in Independence, Ohio with his family.

| Preceded by Libor Polasek | Vancouver Canucks first-round draft pick 1993 | Succeeded by Mattias Ohlund |
