= Radisson Lake =

Lake in the state of Minnesota, United States

- Location within Minnesota
- Location: Clearwater County, Minnesota, United States
- Coordinates: 47°9′47″N 95°12′40″W

Radisson Lake is a lake in Clearwater County, Minnesota, in the United States.

Radisson Lake was named for Pierre-Esprit Radisson, a French explorer.

== See also ==
- List of lakes in Minnesota
