= Jason Herter =

Canadian ice hockey player (born 1970)

- Born: October 2, 1970 (age 56) Hafford, Saskatchewan, Canada
- Height: 6 ft 1 in (185 cm)
- Weight: 202 lb (92 kg; 14 st 6 lb)
- Position: Defence
- Shot: Right
- Played for: New York Islanders
- NHL draft: 8th overall, 1989; Vancouver Canucks
- Playing career: 1991–2002
- Coaching career

Current position
- Title: Associate head coach
- Team: Western Michigan
- Conference: NCHC

Biographical details
- Education: University of North Dakota

Coaching career (HC unless noted)
- 2004–2008: Russell Stover U16
- 2008–2009: Fargo Force (assistant)
- 2009–2010: Des Moines Buccaneers (scout)
- 2010–2011: Fargo Force
- 2011–2018: Minnesota–Duluth (assistant)
- 2018–2022: Minnesota Duluth (associate)
- 2022–Present: Western Michigan (associate)

Jason Herter (born October 2, 1970) is a Canadian former professional ice hockey defenceman. He is currently an associate head coach at Western Michigan.

Drafted in the first round, eighth overall by the Vancouver Canucks in the 1989 NHL entry draft, Herter played one National Hockey League (NHL) game, scoring an assist in a game with the New York Islanders during the 1995–96 season.

Herter represented Canada at one International Ice Hockey Federation-sanctioned event, winning gold at the 1990 World Junior Ice Hockey Championships in Helsinki, Finland. Herter also represented Canada at the 1990 Goodwill Games where Canada finished in fourth place.

== Personal life ==
Herter was born on October 2, 1970, in Hafford, Saskatchewan. He is married to wife Laura and has a daughter, Jordyn, and a son, Jacob. Jason is of French Métis descent. Herter attended Notre Dame College in Wilcox, Saskatchewan, for four years.

== Playing career ==
=== Notre Dame Hounds ===
Herter played midget high school hockey at Athol Murray College of Notre Dame in Wilcox, Saskatchewan aka: Notre Dame Hounds of the Saskatchewan Hockey Association (SHA). During the 1986–87 season, he played on the Hounds midget team that placed second at the 1987 Air Canada Cup in Gloucester, Ontario. His 86-87 high school hockey teammates included future NHLers Scott Pellerin (1992 Hobey Baker Winner as the best player in NCAA college hockey), Rod Brind'amour, Jeff Batters and Joby Messier Herter remained with the Hounds for the next season when the team moved from minor hockey to Junior A, joining the Saskatchewan Junior Hockey League (SJHL). In the team's first season, Herter scored 38 points in 54 games as the Hounds won the Credential Cup as SJHL champions. After winning the Anavet Cup and Abbott Cup, the Hounds advanced to the 1988 Centennial Cup in Pembroke, Ontario. There, Herter scored two points in five tournament games—including one goal in a 9–7 victory over the Thunder Bay Flyers—as the Hounds defeated the Halifax Lions 3–2 in the final game to win the national Junior A championship.

=== University of North Dakota ===
Following his Centennial Cup-winning season with Notre Dame, Herter moved to the University of North Dakota to play college hockey with the North Dakota Fighting Sioux of the Western Collegiate Hockey Association (WCHA). Midway through his freshman season, Herter was ranked as the top player available at the 1989 NHL entry draft by the NHL Central Scouting Bureau. Herter finished his freshman season with eight goals and 24 assists in 41 games. His 24 assists and 32 points set single-season freshmen assist and point records at North Dakota, although his point record has since been broken. Following the season, Herter entered the 1989 NHL Entry Draft ranked second overall among North American skaters, dropping one position in the NHL Central Scouting Bureau's final draft ranking. On June 17, 1989, he was drafted 8th overall by the Vancouver Canucks.

Despite being drafted, Herter returned to North Dakota for his sophomore season. He also had the option of joining the Saskatoon Blades, the team that held Western Hockey League rights, but chose North Dakota because the Canucks had five other prospects playing there. Throughout the season, Herter suffered from chronic groin injuries and a knee sprain which limited him to only 38 games. However, despite his injury-plagued season, Herter scored eleven goals and 39 assists. Nine of his eleven goals were scored on the powerplay, a North Dakota single-season record for a defenceman. Further, his 39 assists and fifty points are both fourth all-time for a defenceman in a single season with the Fighting Sioux. For his performance, Herter was named to the WCHA Second All-Star Team as well as the All-Tournament Team at the 1990 WCHA Men's Ice Hockey Tournament.

At the completion of his sophomore season, Herter chose once again not to sign a professional contract and returned to North Dakota for his junior year.

=== Vancouver Canucks ===
Following his junior season with North Dakota, Herter signed a three-year, $500,000 contract with the Vancouver Canucks that included a $100,000 signing bonus, despite Fighting Sioux coach Gino Gasparini suggesting he play his senior season. Herter then joined the Canucks for his first professional training camp and played in five pre-season games before being assigned to the Milwaukee Admirals, Vancouver's International Hockey League (IHL) affiliate. Herter's chronic groin injuries continued throughout his rookie professional season and he played in only 56 of Milwaukee's 82 regular season games and one of five playoff games.

=== New York Islanders ===
In December 1995, Herter was recalled by the New York Islanders after multiple injuries to Islanders defencemen. On December 7, Herter made his NHL debut in a 7–4 loss to the Hartford Whalers. Herter was one of the bright spots in the Islanders' loss, as he was on the ice for three of New York's four goals and none of Hartford's seven goals. He also assisted on Zigmund Palffy's second goal of the game and was partnered on defence with NHL All-Star Mathieu Schneider.

== International play ==
Jason Herter
Medal record

Representing Canada

Men's ice hockey

World Junior Championships
Gold medal – first place	1990 Helsinki	Ice hockey

Herter represented Canada at one International Ice Hockey Federation-sanctioned event. In July 1989, he was among 32 players invited to the Canadian national junior team's summer evaluation camp in Kitchener, Ontario, for the 1990 World Junior Ice Hockey Championships. Later that year in December, Herter was invited to the national junior team training camp, after which he was named to the final Canadian roster for the tournament despite finishing training camp with a groin injury. Herter finished the tournament with one assist in seven games as Canada achieved a 5–1–1 record to win the gold medal.

In July and August 1990, Herter was a member of the Canadian team at the 1990 Goodwill Games in Seattle, Washington. After finishing the round robin with a 3–0 record, the Canadian team lost 5–4 in a shootout against the United States in their semifinal game and 6–1 to Sweden in the bronze medal game to finish the tournament in fourth place.

== Post-playing career ==
After retiring from ice hockey, Herter became a scout with the United States Hockey League (USHL). He then became head coach of the Overland Park, Kansas-based Russell Stover U16 ice hockey team of the Midwest Elite Hockey League (MWEHL). In April 2008, Herter joined the Fargo Force as an assistant coach behind former University of North Dakota head coach Dean Blais. Jason Herter left after the 2010-11 season to become an assistant coach at the University of Minnesota-Duluth.

== Awards and honours ==
Award	Year
All-WCHA Second Team	1989–90
WCHA All-Tournament Team	1990
All-WCHA Second Team	1990–91
WCHA All-Academic Team	1990, 1991

== Transactions ==
- June 17, 1989 – Drafted in the first round, 8th overall by the Vancouver Canucks in the 1989 NHL entry draft
- August 6, 1993 – Signed as an unrestricted free agent by the Dallas Stars
- September 21, 1995 – Traded by the Dallas Stars to the New York Islanders for cash

== Career statistics ==
=== Regular season and playoffs ===
			Regular season					Playoffs
Season	Team	League	GP	G	A	Pts	PIM	GP	G	A	Pts	PIM
1987–88	Notre Dame Hounds	SJHL	54	5	33	38	152	—	—	—	—	—
1988–89	University of North Dakota	WCHA	41	8	24	32	62	—	—	—	—	—
1989–90	University of North Dakota	WCHA	38	11	39	50	40	—	—	—	—	—
1990–91	University of North Dakota	WCHA	39	11	26	37	52	—	—	—	—	—
1991–92	Milwaukee Admirals	IHL	56	7	18	25	34	1	0	0	0	2
1992–93	Hamilton Canucks	AHL	70	7	16	23	68	—	—	—	—	—
1993–94	Kalamazoo Wings	IHL	68	14	28	42	92	5	3	0	3	14
1994–95	Kalamazoo Wings	IHL	60	12	20	32	70	16	2	8	10	10
1995–96	Utah Grizzlies	IHL	74	14	31	45	58	20	4	10	14	8
1995–96	New York Islanders	NHL	1	0	1	1	0	—	—	—	—	—
1996–97	Kansas City Blades	IHL	71	9	26	35	62	3	0	1	1	0
1997–98	Kansas City Blades	IHL	57	6	19	25	55	—	—	—	—	—
1997–98	Orlando Solar Bears	IHL	8	1	3	4	8	17	5	7	12	20
1998–99	EV Landshut	DEL	46	14	16	30	66	3	1	1	2	29
1999–2000	München Barons	DEL	44	6	14	20	74	11	1	3	4	43
2000–01	München Barons	DEL	54	15	18	33	70	11	4	5	9	12
2001–02	München Barons	DEL	19	4	4	8	26	6	1	3	4	4
IHL totals			394	63	145	208	379	62	14	26	40	54
NHL totals			1	0	1	1	0	—	—	—	—	—
DEL totals			163	39	52	91	236	31	7	12	19	88

=== International statistics ===
Year	Team	Event	GP	G	A	Pts	PIM
1990	Canada	WJC	7	0	1	1	2
Junior totals			7	0	1	1	2

== See also ==
- List of players who played only one game in the NHL

Sporting positions
Preceded by Trevor Linden	Vancouver Canucks first-round draft pick 1989	Succeeded by Petr Nedvěd
