= Redberry Lake Biosphere Reserve =

UNESCO Biosphere Reserve in Saskatchewan, Canada

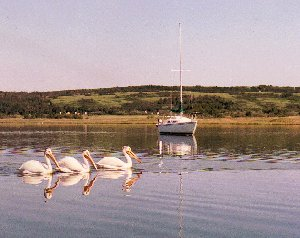
- Redberry Lake

- Location within Saskatchewan Location within Canada
- Location: Saskatchewan, Canada
- Nearest city: Saskatoon
- Coordinates: 52°36′N 107°12′W
- Area: 112,200 ha (277,000 acres)
- Established: 2000
- Governing body: Redberry Regional Economic Development Authority Corporation; Rural Municipalities of Redberry, Douglas, Meeting Lake, and Great Bend; Lucky Man First Nations Reserve; and Hafford, Saskatchewan.

The Redberry Lake Biosphere Region was established in 2000 as a UNESCO Biosphere Reserve covering 112,200 hectares (277,000 acres) in the province of Saskatchewan, Canada. In 2019, the reserve expanded to become a region including the Redberry Lake watershed and surrounding land encompassing close to 700,000 hectares (1,700,000 acres) of land. The regional landscape is composed of rolling prairie dotted with seasonal ponds and marshes along with aspen/shrub groves. The core area is Redberry Lake, a saline lake with several islands. The lake is also an Important Bird Area (IBA) of Canada. There are small patches of natural mixed prairie which are very rare in this highly grazed and cultivated part of the prairies. The Redberry Lake Biosphere Region is committed to balancing conservation with sustainable development.

== Ecological characteristics ==
Redberry Lake is an endorheic lake in which water entering the lake does not pass out through downstream flows. The lake itself is a large kettle hole characterized by a central flat bottom. Gently shelving underwater slopes occur above depths of approximately 25 metres (82 ft). Water is shallowest in the south-west, south-east and north-east areas, and around the islands.

Major habitats and land cover types include: typical prairie grasses such as wheat grass, fescue, oat grass, and sedges; forest dominated by aspen with shrubs such as rasp, silver willow, and hawthorn; a saline lake with rocky islands; farmland cultivated with wheat and barley; and pasture land. The reserve provides habitats for nine endangered, threatened or rare bird species, as well as over 180 other species including the whooping crane (Grus Americana), burrowing owl (Athene Cunicularia), white-winged scoter (Melanitta fusca), California gull (Larus californicus), ring-billed gull (Larus delawarensis), and piping plovers (Charadrius melodus). A key research activity undertaken in the area is monitoring of American white pelican (Pelecanus erythrorhynchos) nesting sites.

== Socio-economic characteristics ==
The region is home to a group of diverse people and cultures including Indigenous Plains Cree, Ukrainian, Mennonite, Doukhobors and other European cultures. The main economic activities in the region are agriculture and livestock raising. Ecotourism development over the past decades has encouraged new ways of looking at local habitats and brought new hope to some community enterprises. The expansion of sustainable tourism activities in tandem with wildlife protection is supported by a vast majority of stakeholders, including representatives of the local communities. The protected status of the site prevents tourism from intruding into fragile areas and allows tourist numbers to be kept at sustainable levels.

New sustainable models of agriculture are being adopted including grazing management in prairies ecosystems and there exists strong potential for the development of new sustainable agriculture, livestock and silviculture products that could be marketed under the biosphere reserve 'brand'. There is also potential for linkages with other biosphere reserves to market products from sustainable resource use, and to educate the general public about conservation practices.

The reserve is administered by the Redberry Regional Economic Development Authority Corporation; Rural Municipalities of Redberry, Douglas, Meeting Lake, and Great Bend; Lucky Man First Nations Reserve; and Hafford, Saskatchewan.

== Area ==
The reserve's surface area is 112,200 ha (277,000 acres). The core area is 5,600 ha (14,000 acres), surrounded by buffer zone(s) of 6,300 ha (16,000 acres), and transition area(s) of 100,300 ha (248,000 acres). The Region as a whole is 670,000 ha (1,700,000 acres).

== See also ==
- Biosphere Reserves of Canada
- List of Migratory Bird Sanctuaries of Canada
- List of protected areas of Saskatchewan
- Crooked Trees

== Sources ==
This article incorporates text from a free content work (license statement/permission). Text taken from UNESCO - MAB Biosphere Reserves Directory, UNESCO, UNESCO.
