= Radisson Lake (Saskatchewan) =

Lake in Saskatchewan, Canada

- Location in Saskatchewan Radisson Lake (Canada)
- Location: RM of Great Bend No. 405, Saskatchewan
- Coordinates: 52.4887°N 107.4067°W
- Type: Salt lake
- Part of: Saskatchewan River drainage basin
- Primary outflows: None
- Basin countries: Canada
- Surface area: 445.2 ha (1,100 acres)
- Surface elevation: 517 m (1,696 ft)

Radisson Lake is an endorheic salt lake in the Canadian province of Saskatchewan. It is located about 1.7 kilometres (1.1 mi) north of the town of Radisson in the Rural Municipality of Great Bend No. 405. The lake is in the transition zone between mixed grassland and aspen parkland. Radisson Lake and the nearby town are named after Pierre-Esprit Radisson, who was a French coureur des bois and explorer in New France. He, and his brother-in-law Médard des Groseilliers, were instrumental in the development of the Hudson's Bay Company.

Access to Radisson Lake is from Rural Road, which connects to Highway 340. The Yellowhead Highway runs past the southern shore of the lake. The entire lake and surrounding shoreline is part of an Important Bird Area (IBA) of Canada.

== Radisson Lake IBA ==
Radisson Lake (SK 083) IBA covers an area of 17.07 km^{2} (6.59 sq mi) that includes the lake and surrounding land. The habitat is important to several species of birds, including geese, swans, ducks, piping plovers, and whooping cranes. The beaches along the north-western shore and east-side bay are designated as critical piping plover habitat. This protects the shoreline from development up to the highwater mark.

== See also ==
- List of lakes of Saskatchewan
