= Redberry Lake (Saskatchewan) =

Salt lake in Saskatchewan, Canada

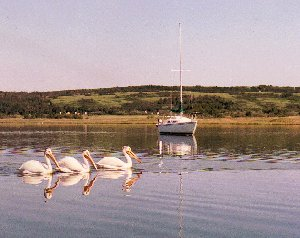
- Redberry Lake

- Location in Saskatchewan Redberry Lake (Canada)
- Location: RM of Redberry No. 435, Saskatchewan
- Coordinates: 52°42′N 107°10′W
- Type: Salt lake
- Part of: Saskatchewan River drainage basin
- Primary inflows: Marshy Creek, natural springs
- Primary outflows: None
- Basin countries: Canada
- Max. length: 9.7 km (6.0 mi)
- Max. width: 9.7 km (6.0 mi)
- Surface area: 5,169 ha (12,770 acres)
- Average depth: +/- 11 m (36 ft)
- Max. depth: 18 m (59 ft)
- Shore length^{1}: 53 km (33 mi)
- Surface elevation: 507 m (1,663 ft)
- Islands: Gramiak Island; Pelican Island; Gull Island; Old Tern Island; New Tern Island
- Settlements: None
- ^{1} Shore length is not a well-defined measure.

Redberry Lake is a kettle salt lake near Hafford in the Canadian province of Saskatchewan. Named after the buffaloberry, it is a medium-sized saline lake within an area characterized by mostly fresh water aquatic environments. The lake makes up the core protected area of the Redberry Lake (UNESCO) Biosphere Reserve and is a federal bird sanctuary of the same name. It is also an Important Bird Area (IBA) of Canada and its northern most island is the location of the provincial Redberry Wildlife Refuge (52.7001°N 107.2006°W). A small regional park is situated at the north-west corner of the lake. The countryside surrounding Redberry Lake is typical of the aspen parkland biome of which it is a part.

Over the past several decades, Redberry Lake water levels have been declining and the salt concentrations increasing. With the declining levels, the shoreline length has been decreasing and the size of the islands in the lake have been increasing. In 1957, a new island — New Tern Island — appeared. In the 1940s, the salt content was low enough that there was a thriving commercial whitefish industry at the lake.

== Lake levels and salinity ==
Redberry Lake water levels have been steadily declining and getting saltier over the past several decades. In 1974, the surface of the lake had an elevation of 515 m (1,690 ft) and an area of 53.42 km^{2} (20.63 sq mi). That compares to 507 m (1,663 ft) and 51.69 km^{2} (19.96 sq mi) in the mid-2020s. In 1926, the salt concentration was 12g/L and by 1988 that had doubled to 24g/L. The increase was attributed to "declining lake depth during drought". Magnesium, sodium, and sulphate make up most of the salt in Redberry Lake.

In 1940–41 with the salt content at only 15g/L, Donald Rawson from the University of Saskatchewan's biology department stocked Redberry Lake with whitefish (Coregonus clupeaformis). The fish thrived and in 1946 a commercial fishery was established. By 1981, though, the salt content had reached 20g/L and the fish could not survive, thus ending the fishery.

== Redberry Lake IBA ==
The Redberry Lake (SK 005) Important Bird Area (IBA) of Canada encompasses the entire lake and much of the surrounding shoreline. The lake and its islands are important nesting areas for birds such as American white pelicans, piping plovers, and whooping cranes. The total area protected is 136.17 square kilometres (52.58 sq mi).

== Redberry Lake Regional Park ==
Redberry Lake Regional Park (52.7120°N 107.217°W), which was founded in 1969, offers camping, golfing, swimming, hiking, boating, and many bird watching opportunities. Although there are no sport fish in the lake itself, the park has installed a small earthen dam on a creek which flows into the lake, creating a freshwater trout pond. The golf course, built in 1971, is a 9-hole, par 35 course. It has sand greens and is 2,304 yards.

Access to the park and its amenities is from Highway 40.

== See also ==
- List of lakes of Saskatchewan
- List of protected areas of Saskatchewan
