= Vivian Prokop =

Canadian businesswoman

Vivian Prokop (June 5, 1959 - December 27, 2017) was a Canadian businesswoman. She was the Chief executive officer and Executive Director of The Canadian Youth Business Foundation.

Prokop was named for three consecutive years in the WXN Top 100 Most Powerful Women in Canada (2010, 2011, 2012), and recipient of a 2013 Queen Elizabeth II Diamond Jubilee Medal from Prime Minister Stephen Harper for her contribution to entrepreneurship in Canada which launched 5,000 new businesses creating over 20,000 new jobs as the CEO of The Canadian Youth Business Foundation (CYBF), and for her international work as the Founder of the G20 Young Entrepreneur Alliance (G20YEA).
