= Hamilton Canucks =

Ice hockey team

- City: Hamilton, Ontario
- League: American Hockey League
- Operated: 1992–1994
- Home arena: Copps Coliseum
- Colors: Gold, black
- Affiliate: Vancouver Canucks

Franchise history
- 1992–1994: Hamilton Canucks
- 1994–present: Syracuse Crunch

The Hamilton Canucks were a professional ice hockey team in the American Hockey League (AHL). They played in Hamilton, Ontario, at Copps Coliseum. They were the AHL affiliate of the Vancouver Canucks of the National Hockey League (NHL).

The team was the top minor league affiliate of the Vancouver Canucks for two seasons (1992–1994) in the AHL, and was initially owned by former NHL player Pat Hickey, Canadian Football League legend Bernie Faloney and Dieter Beer. Just as the first season concluded, the three sold their interest to a group that called themselves "Double Hitch Enterprises"; both Faloney and Beer left and Hickey stayed on as the president.

The second season started off with the team deciding to dump the Hamilton Canucks jersey in favour of wearing exactly the same jersey as their parent team. They also introduced a caveman theme, and had a mascot dressed as a caveman who waved around a sponge club and chants. After the first home game, Pat Hickey left the franchise. A few days later the new owners ceased operations.

The AHL was angered by the ownership group pulling the plug after a single home game and thus had to run the franchise going forward or fold it. It took about 3 weeks of back and forth negotiations with the AHL and Vancouver. The final result was that hockey would stay for the season in Hamilton and the team given to Vancouver to operate. One of the suitors for the team at the time was Syracuse, New York - where the franchise would eventually wind up in October 1994.

In spite of all the off the ice drama, the team did dramatically better than the first season and actually made the playoffs. But a hot Cornwall goalie, Garth Snow and sniper Rene Corbet made short work of the Canucks in four games. With no local interest, Vancouver moved their AHL franchise and it became the Syracuse Crunch.

Two years later, the Edmonton Oilers moved their AHL affiliate into Copps Coliseum, as the Hamilton Bulldogs.

== Season-by-season results ==
Season	Games	Won	Lost	Tied	Points	Goals for	Goals against	Standing
1992–93	80	29	45	6	64	284	327	6th, South
1993–94	80	36	37	7	79	302	305	2nd, South

=== Playoffs ===
Season	1st round	2nd round	3rd round	Finals
1992–93	Did not qualify.			
1993–94	L, 0–4, Cornwall	—	—	—

== See also ==
- List of ice hockey teams in Ontario
