= Canadian federal election results in Southern Saskatchewan =

Electoral history
Year	Results
2021	
2019	
2015	
2011	
2008	
2006	
2004	
2000	
1997	
1993	
1988	
1984	
1980	
1979	
1974	
1972	
1968	
1965	
1963	
1962	
1958	
1957	
1953	
1949	
1945	
1940	
1935	
1926	
1925	

This is page shows results of Canadian federal elections in the southern part of the province of Saskatchewan.

== Regional profile ==
Southern Saskatchewan typically produces an extreme urban-rural split, although it has been masked by the Conservatives' near-sweep of the region from 2004 to 2011. The ridings that are entirely rural (e.g. Souris—Moose Mountain and Yorkton—Melville) are almost as conservative as ridings in rural Alberta, and are even more so now with issues like same-sex marriage being highly unpopular. The urban areas of Regina and Moose Jaw are traditionally more supportive of the New Democratic Party, but they were wiped out in three-way races in 2004, and were unable to recover in 2006 or 2008. The Liberals also has some support in Regina, but it really only translates into one seat - that of local born and raised veteran politician, former Finance Minister, former Public Safety Minister and former Liberal deputy leader Ralph Goodale. Like Saskatoon, Regina has double the population of a typical Canadian urban riding. However, until 2015 the surrounding areas were thought to be too thinly populated for ridings of their own. As a result, for almost two decades Regina's four federal ridings included large blocks of rural territory. The rural presence in the Regina area ridings largely neutralized the NDP and Liberal blocs after the end of vote-splitting on the right in 2004.

With the 2015 redistribution, Regina is now split between three ridings—one hybrid urban-rural riding and two located almost entirely within the city limits. Mirroring the split in the city as a whole, each major party took one seat each, with the NDP winning a seat here for the first time since 2000. In 2019, however, the entire province swung over dramatically to support Conservative leader Andrew Scheer, who holds the hybrid urban-rural seat of Regina—Qu'Appelle. The Tories swept the entire region, in the process unseating the Prairies' highest-profile minister, Goodale. This left Regina with no centre-left MPs for the first time since 1965.

== 2021 ==
Electoral district	Candidates							Incumbent
Electoral district	Liberal	Conservative	NDP	Green	PPC	Maverick	Independent	Incumbent
Cypress Hills—Grasslands	Mackenzie Hird; 1,492; 4.35%	Jeremy Patzer; 24,518; 71.53%	Alex McPhee; 3,604; 10.51%	Carol Vandale; 284; 0.83%	Charles Reginald Hislop; 2,826; 8.24%	Mark Skagen; 1,360; 3.97%	Maria Rose Lewans; 193; 0.56%	Jeremy Patzer
Moose Jaw—Lake Centre—Lanigan	Katelyn Zimmer; 2,526; 6.13%	Fraser Tolmie; 24,869; 60.39%	Talon Regent; 7,975; 19.36%	Isaiah Hunter; 438; 1.06%	Chey Craik; 4,712; 11.44%	David Craig Townsend; 664; 1.61%		Tom Lukiwski†
Regina—Lewvan	Susan Cameron; 6,310; 13.82%	Warren Steinley; 21,375; 46.83%	Tria Donaldson; 15,763; 34.54%	Michael Wright; 560; 1.23%	Roderick Kletchko; 1,635; 3.58%			Warren Steinley
Regina—Qu'Appelle	Cecilia Melanson; 3,344; 10.15%	Andrew Scheer; 20,400; 61.90%	Annaliese Bos; 6,879; 20.87%	Naomi Hunter; 668; 2.03%	Andrew Yubeta; 1,668; 5.06%			Andrew Scheer
Regina—Wascana	Sean McEachern; 10,390; 26.92%	Michael Kram; 19,261; 49.90%	Erin Hidlebaugh; 6,975; 18.07%	Victor Lau; 622; 1.61%	Mario Milanovski; 1,352; 3.50%			Michael Kram
Souris—Moose Mountain	Javin Ames-Sinclair; 1,636; 4.16%	Robert Kitchen; 30,049; 76.38%	Hannah Ann Duerr; 3,107; 7.90%		Diane Neufeld; 3,571; 9.08%	Greg Douglas; 977; 2.48%		Robert Kitchen
Yorkton—Melville	Jordan Ames-Sinclair; 2,187; 6.31%	Cathay Wagantall; 23,794; 68.65%	Halsten David Rust; 4,239; 12.23%	Valerie Brooks; 614; 1.77%	Braden Robertson; 3,227; 9.31%	Denise Loucks; 597; 1.72%		Cathay Wagantall

== 2019 ==
Electoral district	Candidates							Incumbent
Electoral district	Liberal	Conservative	NDP	Green	PPC	Independent	Other	Incumbent
Cypress Hills—Grasslands	William Caton; 1,595; 4.15%	Jeremy Patzer; 31,140; 81.06%	Trevor Peterson; 3,666; 9.54%	Bill Clary; 719; 1.87%	Lee Harding; 1,075; 2.80%	Maria Lewans; 220; 0.57%		David Anderson†$
Moose Jaw—Lake Centre—Lanigan	Cecilia Melanson; 2,517; 5.60%	Tom Lukiwski; 31,993; 71.12%	Talon Regent; 7,660; 17.03%	Gillian Walker; 1,201; 2.67%	Chey Craik; 1,613; 3.59%			Tom Lukiwski
Regina—Lewvan	Winter Fedyk; 6,826; 13.23%	Warren Steinley; 27,088; 52.48%	Jigar Patel; 14,767; 28.61%	Naomi Hunter; 2,099; 4.07%	Trevor Wowk; 573; 1.11%	Don Morgan; 201; 0.39%	Ian Bridges (NCA); 60; 0.12%	Erin Weir†
Regina—Qu'Appelle	Jordan Ames-Sinclair; 4,543; 11.72%	Andrew Scheer; 24,463; 63.12%	Ray Aldinger; 7,685; 19.83%	Dale Dewar; 1,282; 3.31%	Tracey Sparrowhawk; 513; 1.32%	Kieran Szuchewycz; 78; 0.20%	Éric Normand (Rhino.); 75 0.19%	Andrew Scheer
Regina—Qu'Appelle	Jordan Ames-Sinclair; 4,543; 11.72%	Andrew Scheer; 24,463; 63.12%	Ray Aldinger; 7,685; 19.83%	Dale Dewar; 1,282; 3.31%	Tracey Sparrowhawk; 513; 1.32%	Kieran Szuchewycz; 78; 0.20%	James Plummer (Libert.); 116 0.30%	Andrew Scheer
Regina—Wascana	Ralph Goodale; 15,242; 33.61%	Michael Kram; 22,418; 49.43%	Hailey Clark; 5,801; 12.79%	Tamela Friesen; 1,316; 2.90%	Mario Milanovski; 450; 0.99%	Evangeline Godron; 128; 0.28%		Ralph Goodale
Souris—Moose Mountain	Javin Ames-Sinclair; 1,718; 4.13%	Robert Kitchen; 35,067; 84.40%	Ashlee Hicks; 3,214; 7.74%	Judy Mergel; 681; 1.64%	Phillip Zajac; 702; 1.69%		Travis Patron (CNP); 168; 0.40%	Robert Kitchen
Yorkton—Melville	Connor Moen; 2,488; 6.42%	Cathay Wagantall; 29,523; 76.15%	Carter Antoine; 4,747; 12.24%	Stacey Wiebe; 1,070; 2.76%	Ryan Schultz; 941; 2.43%			Cathay Wagantall

== 2015 ==
Electoral district	Candidates					Incumbent
Electoral district	Conservative	NDP	Liberal	Green	Other	Incumbent
Cypress Hills—Grasslands	David Anderson; 25,050; 69.19%	Trevor Peterson; 4,783; 13.21%	Marvin Wiens; 5,381; 14.86%	William Caton; 993; 2.74%		David Anderson
Moose Jaw—Lake Centre—Lanigan	Tom Lukiwski; 23,273; 55.46%	Dustan Hlady; 9,978; 23.78%	Perry Juttla; 7,545; 17.98%	Shawn Setyo; 961; 2.29%	Robert Thomas (Rhino.); 208; 0.50%	Ray Boughen†; Palliser
Regina—Lewvan	Trent Fraser; 16,711; 34.94%	Erin Weir; 16,843; 35.21%	Louis Browne; 13,143; 27.48%	Tamela Friesen; 839; 1.75%	Wojciech K. Dolata (Libert.); 298; 0.62%	Tom Lukiwski‡ Regina—Lumsden— Lake Centre
Regina—Qu'Appelle	Andrew Scheer; 16,486; 44.70%	Nial Kuyek; 11,144; 30.21%	Della Anaquod; 8,401; 22.78%	Greg Chatterson; 852; 2.31%		Andrew Scheer
Regina—Wascana	Michael Kram; 12,931; 30.27%	April Bourgeois; 5,362; 12.55%	Ralph Goodale; 23,552; 55.13%	Frances Simonson; 878; 2.06%		Ralph Goodale; Wascana
Souris—Moose Mountain	Robert Gordon Kitchen; 26,315; 70.14%	Vicky O'Dell; 5,131; 13.68%	Steven Bebbington; 5,076; 13.53%	Bob Deptuck; 994; 2.65%		Ed Komarnicki†
Yorkton—Melville	Cathay Wagantall; 21,683; 59.22%	Doug Ottenbreit; 7,396; 20.20%	Brooke Taylor Malinoski; 6,504; 17.76%	Elaine Marie Hughes; 1,030; 2.81%		Garry Breitkreuz†

== 2011 ==
Electoral district	Candidates					Incumbent
Electoral district	Conservative	Liberal	NDP	Green	Independent	Incumbent
Cypress Hills—Grasslands	David Anderson; 20,555; 69.85%	Duane Filson; 1,838; 6.25%	Trevor Peterson; 6,248; 21.23%	Helmi Scott; 788; 2.68%		David Anderson
Palliser	Ray Boughen; 15,850; 47.00%	Russ Collicott; 1,797; 5.33%	Noah Patrick Evanchuk; 15,084; 44.73%	Larissa Shasko; 995; 2.95%		Ray Boughen
Regina—Lumsden— Lake Centre	Tom Lukiwski; 18,076; 53.21%	Monica Lysack; 2,467; 7.26%	Brian Sklar; 12,518; 36.85%	Billy Patterson; 911; 2.68%		Tom Lukiwski
Regina—Qu'Appelle	Andrew Scheer; 15,896; 53.48%	Jackie Miller; 1,400; 4.71%	Fred Clipsham; 11,419; 38.42%	Greg Chatterson; 879; 2.96%	Jeff Breti; 127; 0.43%	Andrew Scheer
Souris—Moose Mountain	Ed Komarnicki; 21,598; 73.98%	Gerald Borrowman; 1,236; 4.23%	Allan Arthur; 5,461; 18.71%	Bob Deptuck; 898; 3.08%		Ed Komarnicki
Wascana	Ian Shields; 14,291; 36.88%	Ralph Goodale; 15,823; 40.83%	Marc Spooner; 7,681; 19.82%	Bill Clary; 954; 2.46%		Ralph Goodale
Yorkton—Melville	Garry Breitkreuz; 21,906; 68.93%	Kash Andreychuk; 2,167; 6.82%	Doug Ottenbreit; 6,931; 21.81%	Elaine Hughes; 774; 2.44%		Garry Breitkreuz

== 2008 ==
Electoral district	Candidates				Incumbent
Electoral district	Conservative	Liberal	NDP	Green	Incumbent
Cypress Hills—Grasslands	David Anderson; 17,922; 64.36%	Duane Filson; 3,691; 13.25%	Scott Wilson; 4,394; 15.78%	Bill Clary; 1,840; 6.61%	David Anderson
Palliser	Ray Boughen; 14,159; 44.12%	Calvin Johnston; 5,489; 17.10%	Don Mitchell; 10,865; 33.85%	Larissa Shasko; 1,580; 4.92%	Dave Batters†
Regina— Lumsden— Lake Centre	Tom Lukiwski; 16,053; 51.09%	Monica Lysack; 4,668; 14.86%	Fred Kress; 8,963; 28.53%	Nicolas Stulberg; 1,737; 5.53%	Tom Lukiwski
Regina—Qu'Appelle	Andrew Scheer; 14,068; 51.85%	Rod Flaman; 2,809; 10.35%	Janice Bernier; 8,699; 32.06%	Greg Chatterson; 1,556; 5.73%	Andrew Scheer
Souris— Moose Mountain	Ed Komarnicki; 19,293; 70.49%	Marlin Belt; 1,834; 6.70%	Raquel Fletcher; 4,599; 16.80%	Bob Deptuck; 1,643; 6.00%	Ed Komarnicki
Wascana	Michelle Hunter; 12,798; 34.64%	Ralph Goodale; 17,028; 46.08%	Stephen Moore; 5,418; 14.66%	George-Richard Wooldridge; 1,706; 4.62%	Ralph Goodale
Yorkton—Melville	Garry Breitkreuz; 19,824; 68.03%	Bryan H. Bell; 1,578; 5.41%	Doug Ottenbreit; 6,076; 20.85%	Jen Antony; 1,664; 5.71%	Garry Breitkreuz

== 2006 ==
Electoral district	Candidates					Incumbent
Electoral district	Liberal	Conservative	NDP	Green	Other	Incumbent
Cypress Hills—Grasslands	Bill Caton; 3,885; 12.89%	David Anderson; 20,035; 66.48%	Mike Eason; 5,076; 16.84%	Amanda Knorr; 1,141; 3.79%		David Anderson
Palliser	John Williams; 7,006; 20.20%	Dave Batters; 14,906; 42.99%	Jo-Anne Dusel; 11,460; 33.05%	Larissa Shasko; 1,182; 3.41%	Marcia Fogal (CAP); 121; 0.35%	Dave Batters
Regina—Lumsden—Lake Centre	Gary Anderson; 8,956; 26.63%	Tom Lukiwski; 14,176; 42.15%	Moe Kovatch; 9,467; 28.15%	Bill Sorochan; 1,035; 3.08%		Tom Lukiwski
Regina—Qu'Appelle	Allyce Herle; 7,134; 23.05%	Andrew Scheer; 12,753; 41.21%	Lorne Nystrom; 10,041; 32.45%	Brett Dolter; 1,016; 3.28%		Andrew Scheer
Souris—Moose Mountain	Lonny McKague; 5,681; 18.51%	Ed Komarnicki; 19,282; 62.82%	Michael Haukeness; 4,284; 13.96%	Matthew Smith; 1,448; 4.72%		Ed Komarnicki
Wascana	Ralph Goodale; 20,666; 51.78%	Brad Farquhar; 11,990; 30.04%	Helen Yum; 5,880; 14.73%	Nigel Taylor; 1,378; 3.45%		Ralph Goodale
Yorkton—Melville	Mervin Joseph Cushman; 4,558; 13.95%	Garry Breitkreuz; 20,736; 63.47%	Jason Dennison; 6,165; 18.87%	Keith Neu; 923; 2.83%	Carl Barabonoff (Ind.); 287; 0.88%	Garry Breitkreuz

== 2004 ==
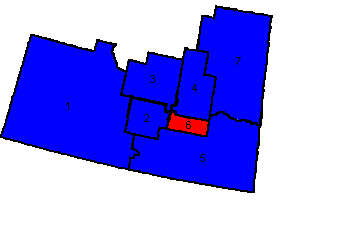
Key map

1. Cypress Hills-Grasslands
2. Palliser
3. Regina-Lumsden-Lake Centre
4. Regina-Qu'Appelle
5. Souris—Moose Mountain
6. Wascana
7. Yorkton—Melville
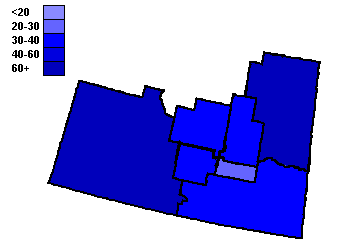
Conservative Party of Canada

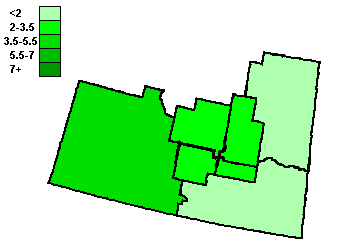
Green Party of Canada

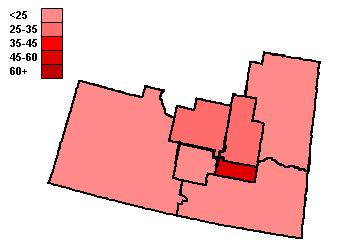
Liberal Party of Canada

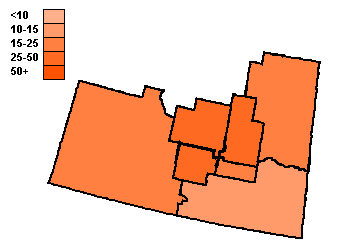
New Democratic Party
