= Andrew Scheer =

Canadian politician (born 1979)

The Honourable Andrew Scheer PC MP
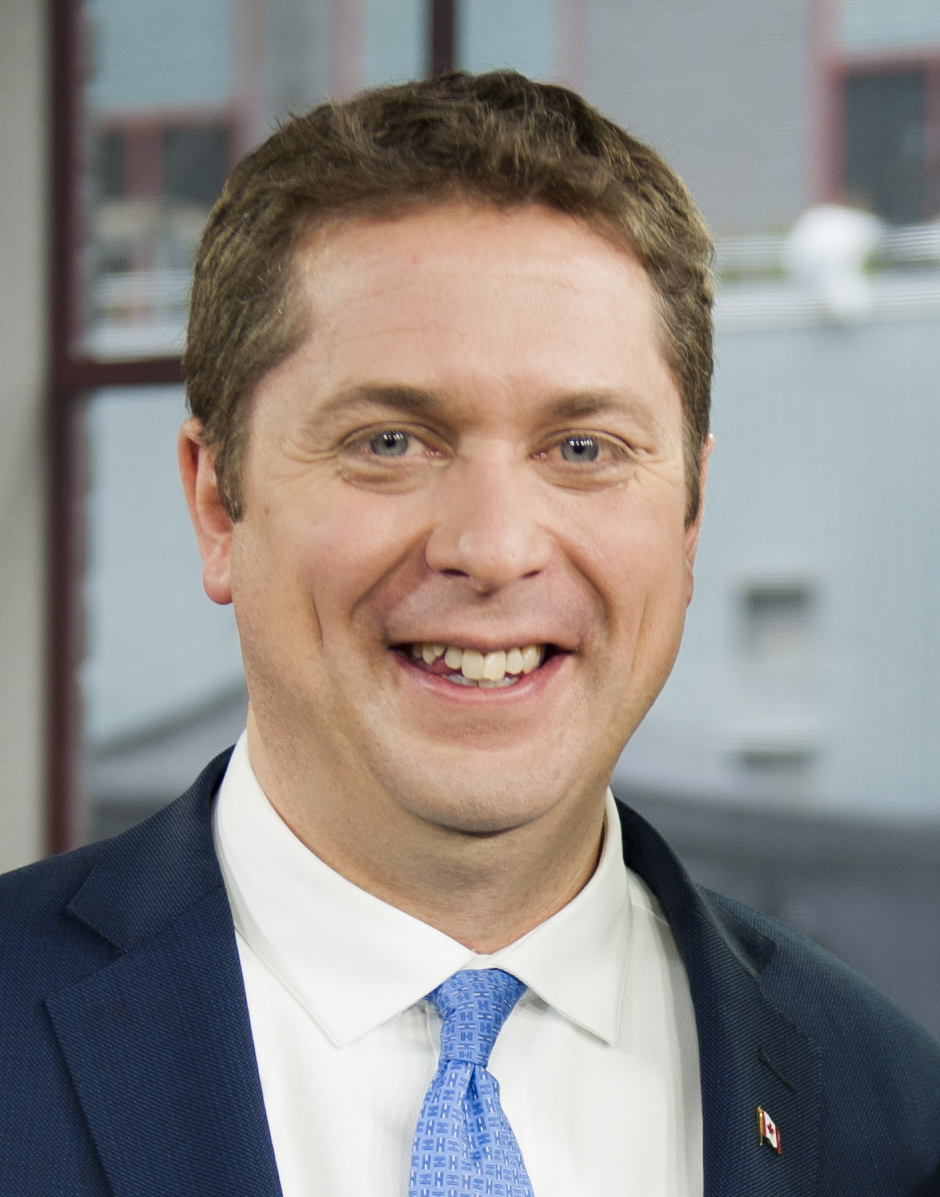
- Scheer in 2017

Opposition House Leader
- Incumbent
- Assumed office September 13, 2022
- Leader: Pierre Poilievre
- Preceded by: John Brassard
- In office November 18, 2015 – September 13, 2016
- Leader: Rona Ambrose
- Preceded by: Peter Julian
- Succeeded by: Candice Bergen

Leader of the Opposition
- In office May 6, 2025 – August 18, 2025
- Deputy: Melissa Lantsman; Tim Uppal
- Preceded by: Pierre Poilievre
- Succeeded by: Pierre Poilievre
- In office May 27, 2017 – August 24, 2020
- Deputy: Denis Lebel; Lisa Raitt; Leona Alleslev
- Preceded by: Rona Ambrose
- Succeeded by: Erin O'Toole

Leader of the Conservative Party
- In office May 27, 2017 – August 24, 2020
- Deputy: Denis Lebel; Lisa Raitt; Leona Alleslev
- Preceded by: Rona Ambrose (interim)
- Succeeded by: Erin O'Toole

35th Speaker of the House of Commons
- In office June 2, 2011 – December 3, 2015
- Deputy: Denise Savoie; Joe Comartin
- Preceded by: Peter Milliken
- Succeeded by: Geoff Regan
Senior political offices
Parliamentary Leader of the Conservative Party
In office May 6, 2025 – August 18, 2025
Leader	Pierre Poilievre
Shadow ministerial positions
Shadow Minister for Infrastructure and Communities
In office September 8, 2020 – October 12, 2022
Leader	Erin O'Toole; Candice Bergen; Pierre Poilievre
Shadowing	Catherine McKenna; Dominic LeBlanc
Preceded by	Luc Berthold
Succeeded by	Leslyn Lewis
Speaker positions
Deputy Speaker of the House of Commons Chair of Committees of the Whole
In office November 21, 2008 – June 1, 2011
Monarch	Elizabeth II
Governors General	Michaëlle Jean; David Johnston
Preceded by	Bill Blaikie
Succeeded by	Denise Savoie
Assistant Deputy Chair of the Committees of the Whole
In office April 5, 2006 – November 20, 2008
Speaker	Peter Milliken
Preceded by	Jean Augustine
Succeeded by	Barry Devolin

Member of Parliament for Regina—Qu'Appelle
- Incumbent
- Assumed office June 28, 2004
- Preceded by: Lorne Nystrom

Personal details
- Born: Andrew James Scheer; May 20, 1979 (age 47) Ottawa, Ontario, Canada
- Citizenship: Canada; United States
- Party: Conservative (2003–present)
- Other political affiliations: Reform (1998–2000); Alliance (2000–2003)
- Height: 6 ft 4 in (193 cm)
- Spouse: Jill Ryan (m. 2003)
- Children: 5
- Relatives: Jon Ryan (brother-in-law)
- Education: University of Ottawa (BA)
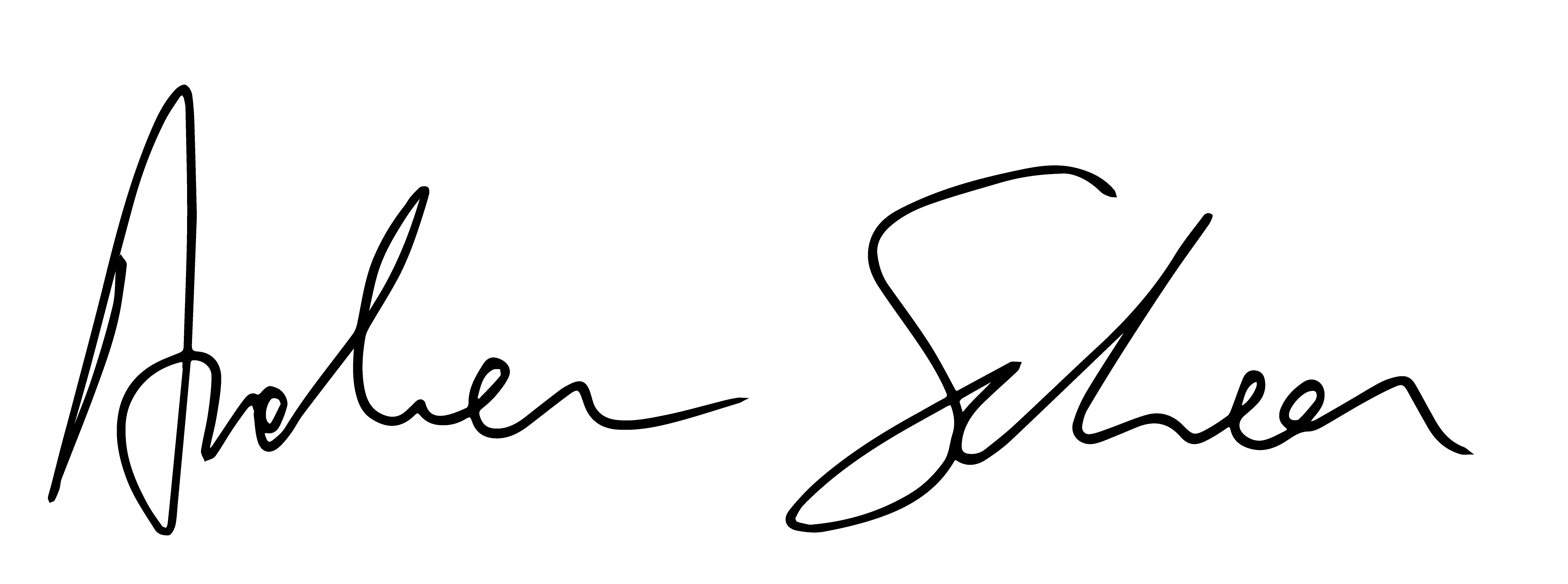
- Signature
- Website: Official website

Andrew James Scheer (born May 20, 1979) is a Canadian politician who has been the member of Parliament (MP) for Regina—Qu'Appelle since 2004. Scheer was the leader of the Conservative Party of Canada from 2017 to 2020. He served as the leader of the Official Opposition from 2017 to 2020 and briefly in 2025. He was the 35th speaker of the House of Commons from 2011 to 2015.

Scheer earned a Bachelor of Arts degree in criminology, political science, and history. Elected to represent the Saskatchewan riding of Regina—Qu'Appelle at the age of 25, Scheer was re-elected in 2006, 2008, and 2011 before becoming House speaker at age 32, making him the youngest speaker in the chamber's history. He held the speaker role for the entirety of the 41st Canadian Parliament. Following the Conservatives' defeat in 2015, Scheer launched his campaign for the leadership of the Conservative Party, running under the slogan of "Real conservative. Real leader". In May 2017, he was elected leader of the Conservative Party in an upset, narrowly defeating former cabinet minister Maxime Bernier.

Scheer has described himself as focused on economic development, fiscal restraint, and reducing inefficiencies in government. He is a staunch opponent of the federal carbon tax and favours the construction of several pipelines. In the 2019 federal election, the Conservatives under Scheer received a plurality of the popular vote and gained 26 seats, but remained the Official Opposition. In December 2019, following weeks of criticism within the party for the unsuccessful campaign he ran, Scheer abruptly announced he would be resigning as party leader effective upon the election of his successor. He was succeeded as leader in August 2020 by former cabinet minister Erin O'Toole.

He was selected to lead the opposition again after Conservative Party leader Pierre Poilievre lost his riding in the 2025 federal election; Scheer held the role for the first three months of the 45th Parliament until Poilievre was elected in a by-election in Battle River—Crowfoot.

== Early life and career ==
Scheer was born on May 20, 1979, at the Riverside Hospital in Ottawa, Ontario and was raised in Ottawa. He is the son of Mary Gerarda Therese (née Enright), a nurse, and James D. Scheer, a librarian, proofreader with the Ottawa Citizen, and Catholic deacon. James was born in the United States, making his son Andrew a U.S. citizen at birth despite being born in Canada. According to a 2019 Maclean's article, Scheer's family earned considerably more than the median income for most Canadian families and he has two sisters. Part of Scheer's family is from Romania and Ireland, and his paternal grandfather was Jewish. Scheer spent summers during his youth with his maternal grandparents in Mississauga. Scheer graduated from Immaculata High School and received the school's "Distinguished Catholic Alumni Award" in 2012.

=== Post-secondary education ===
In 1998, Scheer began his studies in criminology, political science, and history at the University of Ottawa; he would ultimately graduate in 2008, receiving his Bachelor of Arts (BA) degree four years after he was first elected to Parliament. During his earlier university years, Scheer worked on several political campaigns, including the Unite the Right campaign to merge the Progressive Conservative and Reform parties and Preston Manning's campaign to lead the Canadian Alliance. He also worked in the correspondence department of the Office of the leader of the Opposition under Stockwell Day. Scheer also worked on Ottawa city councillor Karin Howard's youth advisory committee. In his third year of university, Scheer ran as a school trustee for the Ottawa-Carleton Catholic School Board in the 2000 Ottawa municipal elections but lost to incumbent Kathy Ablett. After meeting his future wife Jill Ryan at the University of Ottawa, Scheer moved to her hometown of Regina, Saskatchewan, and continued his studies at the University of Regina, taking some courses for his BA there.

=== Pre-MP work ===
In Regina, Scheer worked as an insurance clerk, a waiter, and an assistant in the constituency office of Canadian Alliance MP Larry Spencer. In 2005, Scheer's blog as an MP listed that he was an accredited insurance broker, and in 2007 the biography section on Scheer's MP website stated that he passed the Canadian Accredited Insurance Broker program in Saskatchewan and started his insurance industry career at Shenher Insurance in Regina. During the 2019 election, when Scheer was Conservative leader, his biography on the party website stated that he had worked as an insurance broker. Upon investigation The Globe and Mail found no evidence that he was ever accredited as an insurance broker. Scheer responded to these claims by maintaining that he received accreditation for general insurance after leaving Shenher Insurance in Regina. As of September 2019, the provincial regulator, Insurance Councils of Saskatchewan, was reviewing the matter.

== Political career ==
=== Early years in the House of Commons (2004–2011) ===
Scheer was elected at age 25 as a Conservative candidate in the federal election of 2004, in the riding of Regina—Qu'Appelle, beating New Democratic Party (NDP) MP Lorne Nystrom by 861 votes. Near the end of the race, Scheer accused Nystrom of being soft on child pornography. Scheer was re-elected in the federal election of 2006, again defeating Nystrom, this time by a margin of 2,740 votes.

In April 2006, during the 39th Canadian Parliament, Scheer was named as assistant deputy chairman of Committees of the Whole, one of three deputy speakers. He also sponsored a bill that would create minimum sentences for those convicted of motor vehicle theft called Bill C-343, An Act to amend the Criminal Code (motor vehicle theft).

On November 21, 2008, during the 40th Canadian Parliament, he was named deputy speaker of the House of Commons and chairman of Committees of the Whole, succeeding NDP MP Bill Blaikie.

=== Speaker of the House of Commons (2011–2015) ===
When the Conservative Party won a majority at the federal election in 2011, Scheer's experience as deputy speaker led many to consider him the front-runner to be elected speaker of the House of Commons. On June 2, 2011, Scheer defeated Denise Savoie, the lone opposition and only woman candidate, in the sixth round of balloting. Scheer became the youngest House speaker in Canadian history. Liberal MPs, who opposed Scheer's candidacy, criticized the NDP for voting for their own party member instead of tipping the balance toward Conservative MP Lee Richardson based on the MPs' beliefs that Scheer was "Harper's Boy".

During his tenure, some individual opposition MPs were critical of some of his decisions. Liberal MP Irwin Cotler questioned his impartiality due to a decision over a robocall incident with Campaign Research (it was reported that Scheer was a client of the firm).

During the 2011 Canadian federal election voter suppression scandal, opposition politicians raised concerns over Scheer's interventions to block questions after The Globe and Mail revealed that his riding association loaned $3,000 to Marty Burke while Burke's campaign was under scrutiny by Elections Canada over the incident.

=== After 2015 ===
Scheer was re-elected in the 2015 federal election in which the Conservative government was defeated. He was appointed opposition House leader by leader of the Official Opposition and interim Conservative party leader Rona Ambrose. He thought about running for the position of interim party leader but was dissuaded by fellow caucus MP Chris Warkentin, who pointed out that the interim leader cannot take the permanent position. On September 13, 2016, he announced his resignation as House leader outside a party caucus meeting in Halifax in order to explore a bid for the leadership of the federal Conservative Party.

In 2016, Scheer publicly voiced his support for the UK's decision to vote in favour of Brexit during the referendum. Later in 2018, Scheer tweeted, "I was pro-Brexit before it was cool."

=== 2017 leadership election ===
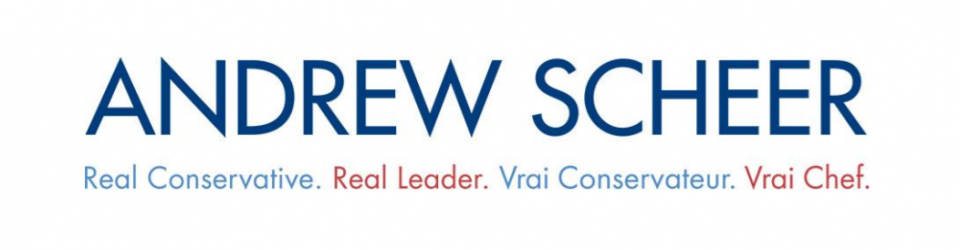
Leadership campaign logo

On September 28, 2016, Scheer announced his bid for the leadership of the Conservative Party, saying that he had the support of 32 members of the Conservative caucus. On May 27, 2017, Scheer was elected as the second leader of the Conservative Party, beating runner up Maxime Bernier and more than 12 others with 50.95 per cent of the vote through 13 rounds. Bernier later attributed his failure to what he called the "fake conservatives" in the supply management dairy lobby and agricultural sector. Scheer garnered laughs at the annual Press Gallery dinner by joking:

"I certainly don't owe my leadership victory to anybody...", stopping in mid-sentence to take a swig of 2% milk from the carton. "It's a high-quality drink and it's affordable too."

Scheer's campaign for the Conservative leadership was run under the slogan "Real conservative. Real leader." He avoided advocating the social conservative issues that some of the candidates championed, saying that he wanted to "reach a broader audience of Canadians". Positions on which he took a strong stance included scrapping the carbon tax and being "tough on crime". During his political career, Scheer has been compared to former Prime Minister Stephen Harper, and has been called "Harper with a smile" or "Stephen Harper 2.0". Scheer is considered a Blue Tory and is critical of the policies of Prime Minister Justin Trudeau, having also been critical of Trudeau's late father, former prime minister Pierre Trudeau. Scheer considered former prime minister John Diefenbaker and British member of the European Parliament (MEP) Daniel Hannan as political influences. Scheer described U.S. senators Ted Cruz and Marco Rubio as "strong conservative voices" during the 2016 Manning Center Conference. Unlike other candidates, Scheer's leadership team was focused less on headlines or eye-grabbing policy and more on data and organizing.

During the Conservative leadership race, Scheer stated that he would balance the federal budget within two years of forming government, but his platform on specific reforms to accomplish this was not revealed at that time.

Scheer benefited from the unexpected support of Brad Trost during the leadership race. It was reported that some of Trost supporters contravened the Canada Elections Act and party membership rules by offering incentives to vote. Dimitri Soudas, a former Harper aide, pointed out that it violated election rules and it benefited Scheer's campaign but the ballots had been destroyed so the result stood.

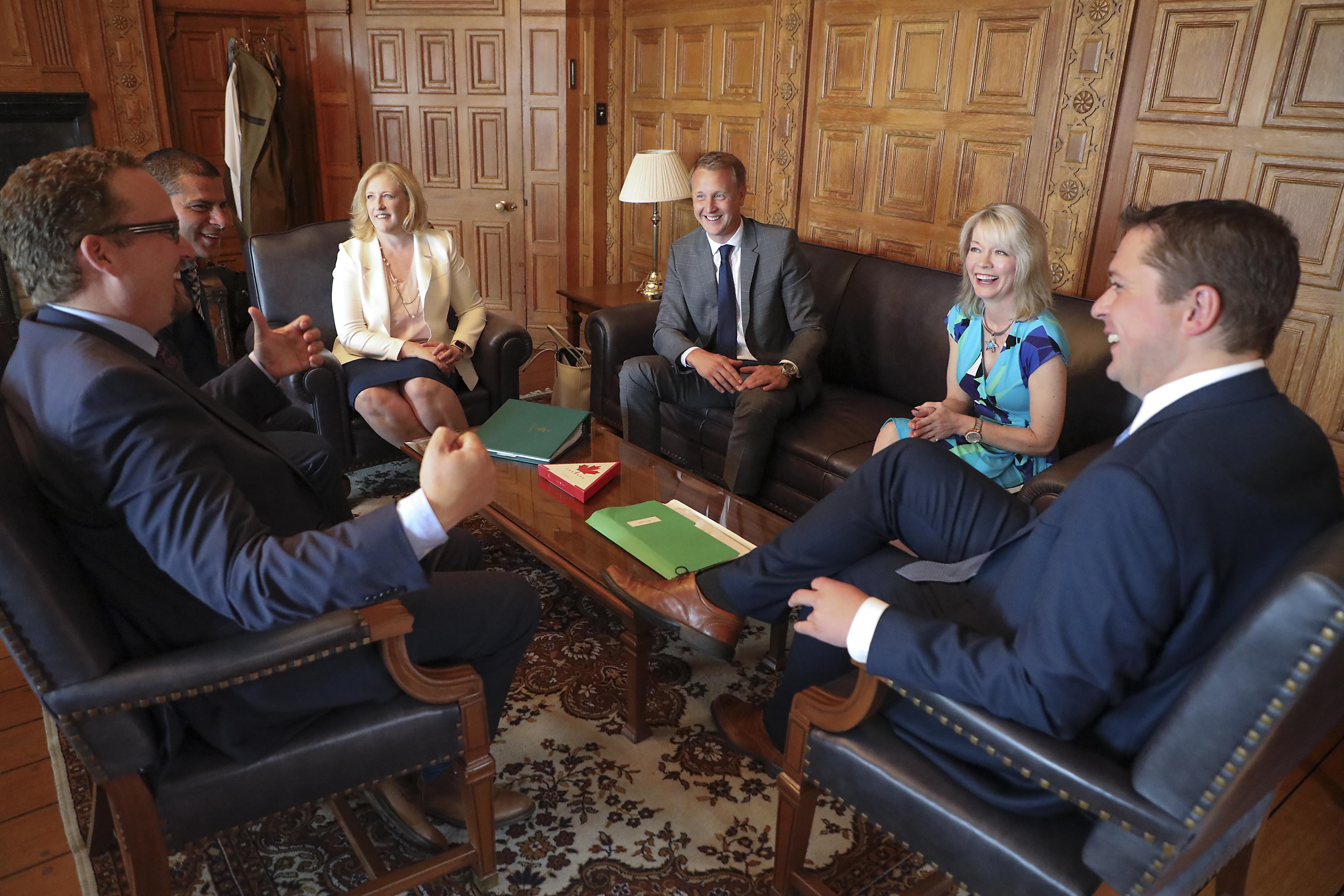
Scheer with his leadership team (Mark Strahl, Alain Rayes, Lisa Raitt, Chris Warkentin, and Candice Bergen) shortly after his leadership victory

Scheer was criticized by opposition politicians for removing his campaign platform after winning the Conservative leadership race. Conservative strategists suggested that the ideas proposed by Scheer during the race were not likely to be part of the party's 2019 election platform. It was later revealed in a Dairy Farmers of Canada briefing document after the 2018 Conservative Convention in Halifax that "The powers of the leader are far reaching in preventing policy from being in the party platform. DFC [Dairy Farmers of Canada] has been told by the Leader’s office that he will exercise this power, and that this policy will not be in the Conservative election platform regardless of the outcome at convention".

The day after the election it was revealed that Hamish Marshall, Scheer's campaign manager, was listed as an IT specialist and one of the directors of the far-right news outlet The Rebel Media. On October 16, 2017, The Globe and Mail asked Scheer if he knew that Marshall worked for the Rebel during the leadership campaign, he responded: "I didn't ask Hamish about every client he had" and then ended the interview. Later, a Conservative spokesperson clarified that Scheer was aware that the Rebel was one of Marshall's many clients, but did not know the specifics. The day after, Marshall was named Conservative campaign chair for the 43rd Canadian federal election. On March 21, 2018, in an interview with Macleans, Scheer stated that Marshall and his past relationship with the Rebel should not be conflated with his selection as campaign chair.

=== Leader of the Conservative Party (2017–2020) ===
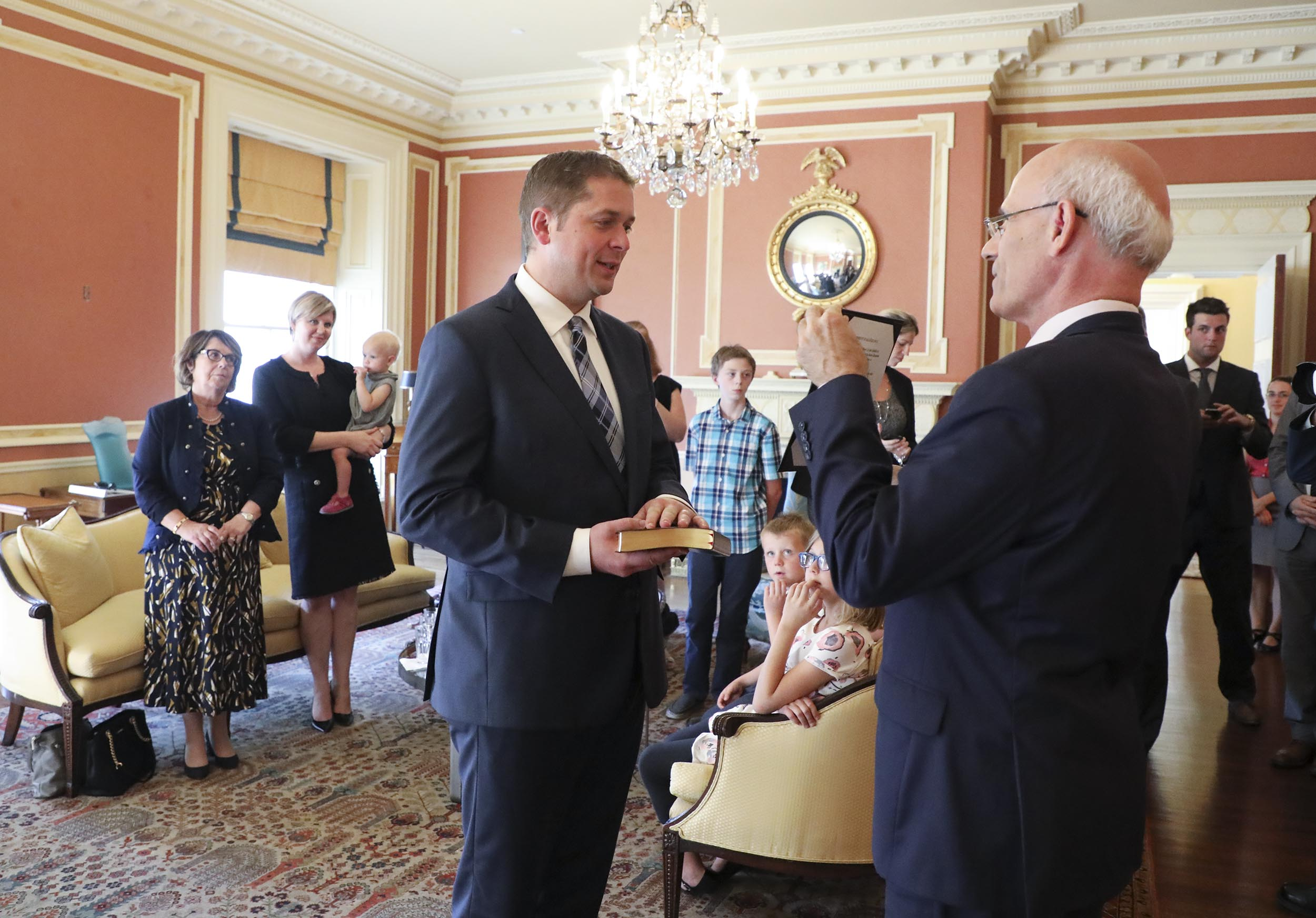
Scheer in the Large Drawing Room of Rideau Hall being sworn into the Queen's Privy Council for Canada

After the August 2017 Charlottesville, Virginia "Unite the Right" rally, Scheer denounced Rebel News due to its sympathetic coverage of the rally, and stated that he would stop doing interviews with The Rebel Media until its "editorial directions" changed. The following day, Scheer stated that he would not be granting interviews with Rebel going forward in an interview with the National Post.

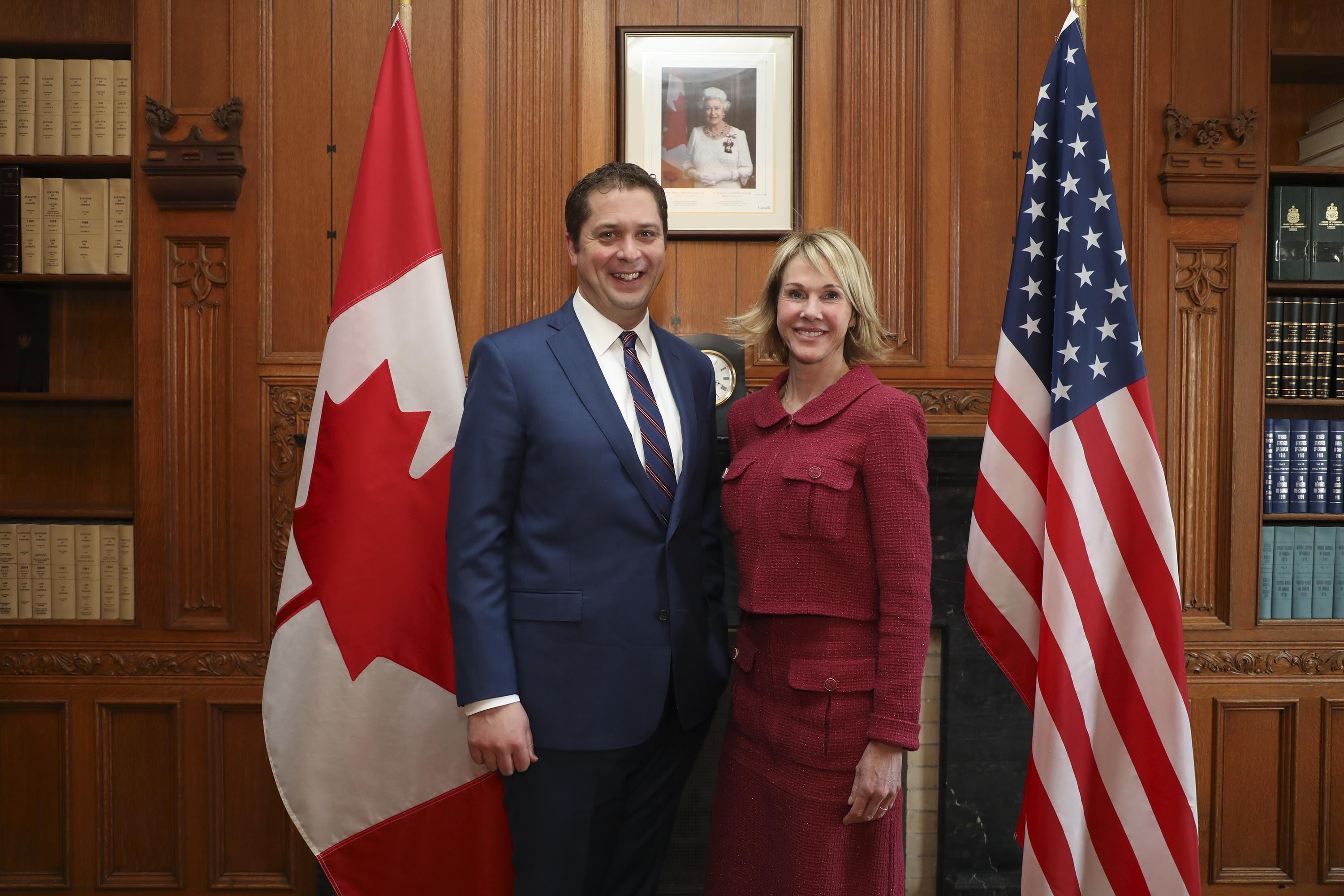
Scheer and US Ambassador to Canada, Kelly Craft, January 2018

On January 4, 2018, Scheer expelled Senator Lynn Beyak from the Conservative caucus, after she refused to remove one of her letters that suggested Indigenous people want to get things for "no effort". He also stated that "Racism will not be tolerated in the Conservative caucus or Conservative Party of Canada". Scheer said that his office was only aware of the letters on 2 January, but Garnet Angeconeb, a residential school survivor, stated that he emailed Scheer and Conservative Senate Leader Larry Smith about them on September 15, 2017, and did not get a response. In response, Beyak said neither Scheer nor anyone from his office contacted her to take down a letter. A senior Conservative source supported Beyak's accusation.

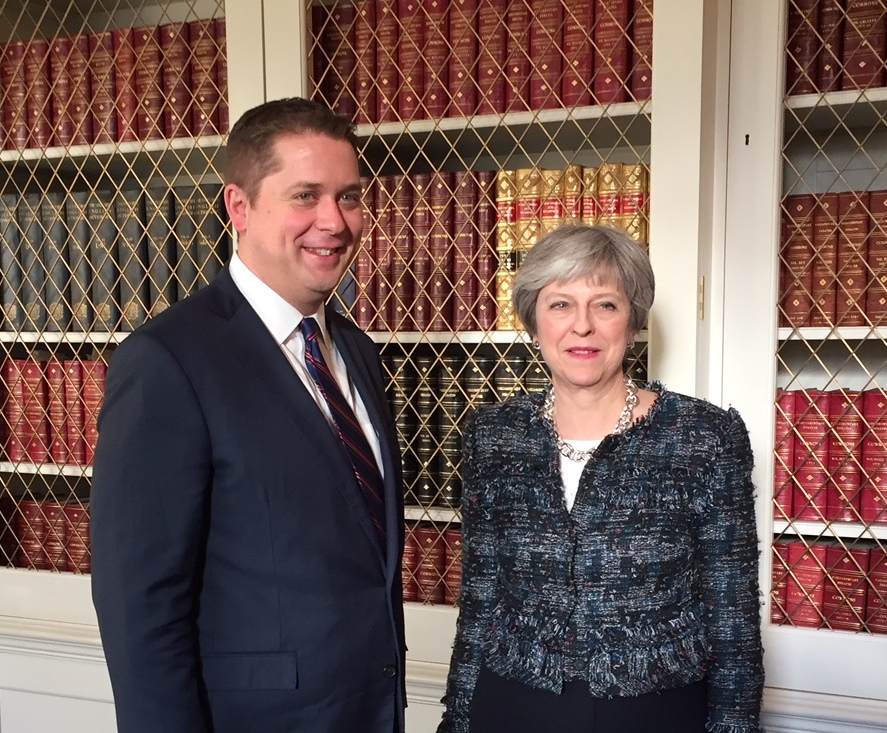
Scheer meeting British Prime Minister Theresa May in London, March 2018

Scheer travelled to the United Kingdom in March 2018 to "lay the groundwork" for a Canada–UK trade agreement, should he become prime minister after the 2019 election. In London, he met with Prime Minister Theresa May, Foreign Secretary Boris Johnson, and other UK ministers including Liam Fox and Sajid Javid. Scheer's trip faced minor criticism from The Globe and Mail and the Ottawa Citizen. The Citizen editorial commented that the trip was "undiplomatic" and "not statesmanlike", while the Globe editorial pointed out that a Canada–UK trade agreement had already been announced the prior year by Prime Minister Trudeau.

Toward the end of March 2018, the Opposition held a filibuster over the government's India trip, which was intended to persuade the governing Liberals to answer questions in the House of Commons about the apparent scandal, and provide open and transparent information to the Canadian public; the filibuster lasted 21 hours costing taxpayers $50,000 per hour in overtime fees. It was revealed that a few days before commencing the filibuster to demand information, Scheer's office was offered a briefing by the Privy Council Office regarding the trip. A spokesperson of Scheer's responded to these claims by stating "Has the government offered Andrew a briefing? The answer is 'no'", and "This [is] fake news." A day later, Andrew Scheer called the allegation "completely false" and stated he would accept an offer if it were made to all members of Parliament. It was later revealed that the clerk of the Privy Council, Michael Wernick approached Scheer's chief of staff and Conservative MP Tony Clement to brief Scheer on any information the Privy Council may have. Clement responded that he would not confirm or deny it. A couple of weeks later, Scheer accepted a briefing on the matter.

After the Conservative Convention in August 2018, Scheer denied an allegation that the Dairy Farmers of Canada worked with his office to block a motion to change the party's position on supply management after a page from the briefing book was already made public on Twitter by a Conservative delegate.

==== 2019 federal election ====
At the 2019 election, Scheer led the Conservatives to a gain of 26 seats for a total of 121, up from 95 at the time of dissolution. However, they finished 36 seats behind the Liberals despite winning 34.4 per cent of the popular vote to the Liberals' 33.1 per cent, a margin of just over 240,000 votes. It was the first time since 1979 that a party won the most seats without winning the popular vote. It was also the first time a government took power with less than 35 per cent of the national popular vote since the John A. Macdonald-led Tories in 1867, who had 34.8 per cent.

Much of the Conservatives' plurality was built on large margins in Alberta and Saskatchewan, where they won 70 per cent and 65 per cent of the popular vote, respectively. However, they only won five seats in the suburbs of the Greater Toronto Area and were completely shut out in Toronto itself, in part due to the unpopularity of the provincial Conservative government of Premier Doug Ford.

On December 12, 2019, Scheer announced that he would resign as leader of the Conservatives and Official Opposition, staying on until a new leader could be selected. The same day, the Conservative Party confirmed that it had been paying the difference in the cost of private school tuition for Scheer's children in Saskatchewan and the higher cost of tuition in Ottawa—insisting the tuition matter was not the reason for Scheer's resignation.

=== Post-leadership (2020–present) ===
On September 8, 2020, Scheer was announced as the Opposition Critic for Infrastructure & Communities in his successor Erin O'Toole's shadow cabinet. In that role, he sponsored private member Bill C-269 to amend the Fisheries Act to prohibit the deposit of raw sewage in water frequented by fish.

On February 2, 2022, Scheer posed for a picture posted on Saskatoon—Grasswood MP Kevin Waugh's Twitter page along with Waugh, Battlefords-Lloydminster MP Rosemarie Falk, Moose Jaw-Lake Centre-Lanigan MP Fraser Tolmie, Regina-Lewvan MP Warren Steinley and Sen. Denise Batters standing with the Saskatchewan flag at the Freedom Convoy 2022. The mayor of Ottawa, Jim Watson, demanded an apology, as he felt the protesters actions are not welcomed and that "MPs and senator in the picture should know better."

He endorsed Pierre Poilievre's campaign to be leader of the Conservative Party in the 2022 Conservative leadership election. On September 13, 2022, Poilievre, as leader of the Conservative Party, appointed Scheer to become Opposition House Leader.

On May 6, 2025, Scheer became leader of the opposition for a second time after Poilievre lost his seat of Carleton following the 2025 election, as the leader of the opposition must be an incumbent MP. He relinquished the position after Poilievre returned to Parliament by winning a by-election in Battle River—Crowfoot.

== Policy positions ==
=== Economy ===
Scheer has proposed a tax cut for the lowest income tax bracket. This tax bracket, for income up to $47,630, would be reduced from 15 per cent to 13.75 per cent over the next four years. The Conservatives has stated this tax cut would save the average individual $444 a year, and a two-income couple $850 per year. Scheer has promised to restore the Children's Fitness Tax Credit, where families can claim $1,000 annually for costs related to fitness or sports. Families with children with disabilities can claim $1,500. Scheer has stated that he will cancel Canada's $250 million annual contribution to the Asian Infrastructure Investment Bank.

Scheer has expressed support for free markets stating that he believes in "a free market where businesses profit by having the best product or service".

Scheer was a major advocate for the removal of the Canadian Wheat Board. Scheer proposed a policy to mandate the inclusion of national flag decals on gas pumps to highlight "Canadian-sourced, ethically produced oil".

Scheer has pledged to repeal the federal carbon tax in order to reduce the tax burden on individuals and businesses.

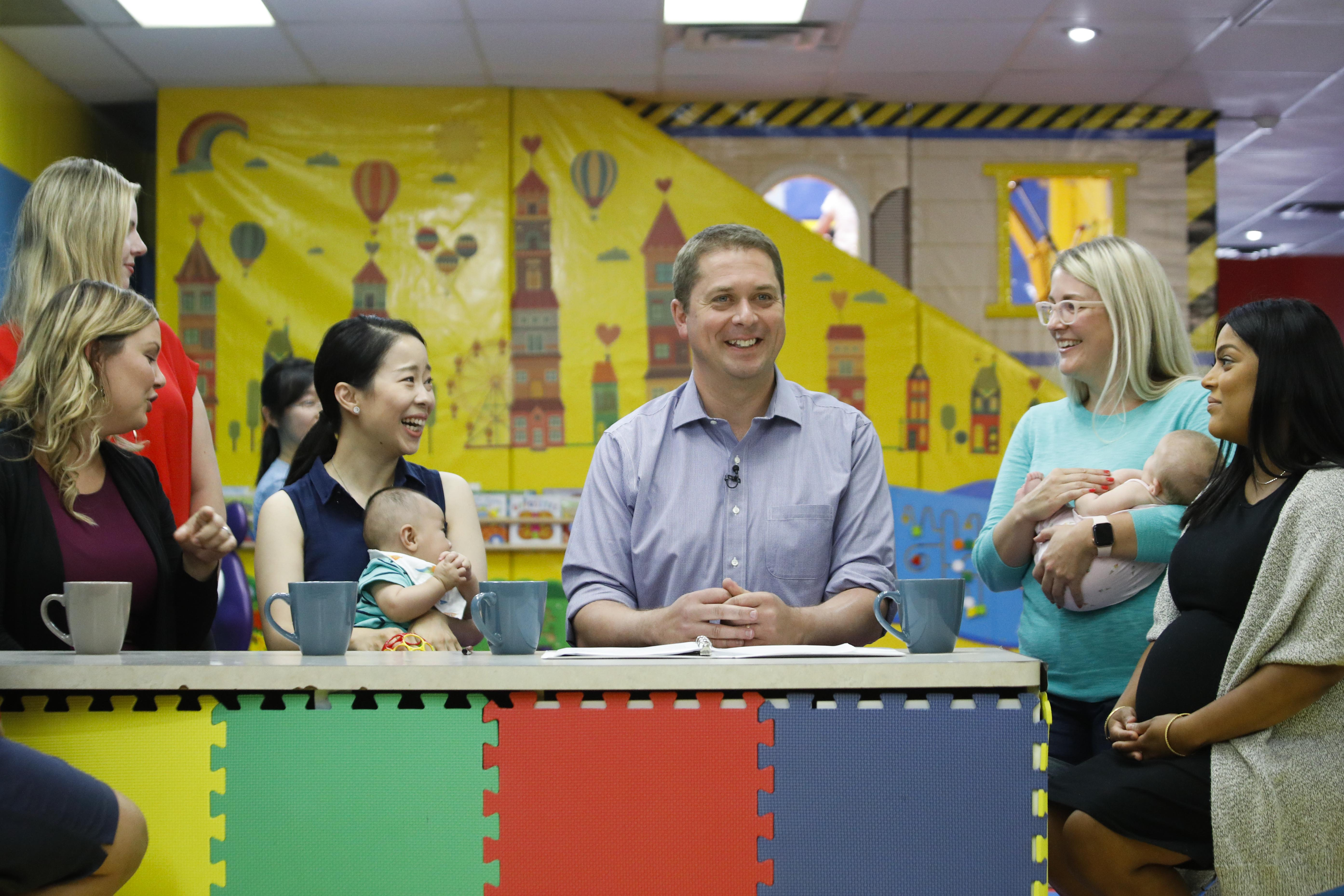
Scheer talking about maternity benefits

Scheer says he wants to make maternity and parental leave less expensive for families. He has promised to make employment insurance for parental and maternity benefits tax-free. He wants to introduce a tax credit to families who send their children to private schools. Scheer also proposes raising the limit on how much employment income a parent can earn each week while on leave. He has vowed to remove HST/GST from home heating bills and lower business taxes. In February 2018 Scheer introduced a private member bill, the second of his career. Bill C-394, An Act to amend the Income Tax Act (parenting tax credit), or as he titled it the Supporting New Parents Act, would create a new tax credit intended to offset federal taxes owing on benefits received from maternity and parental leave. The parliamentary budget office found out that the credit would cost $607.6 million in lost revenue and would rise incrementally each year for the next five years.

During the 2019 Canadian federal election, Scheer proposed he would legislate that corporate takeovers by foreign state-owned enterprises be subject to a national-security review.

=== Education ===
Scheer promised to increase the federal government's contribution to the Registered Education Savings Plan (RESP), increasing it from 20 per cent to 30 per cent annually up to $2,500. He added that low-income families would receive 50 per cent on the first $500 invested instead of the current 40 per cent. He has also promised to revive the Children's Arts and Learning Tax Credit, where families can claim $500 per child for extracurricular arts or education programs, and families with children with disabilities are eligible to claim $1,000 per child.

=== Environment ===
Scheer has described his opposition to a federally-imposed carbon tax. He has said that if he is to form government, he will act to repeal any elements of a plan to implement a carbon tax enacted by the Trudeau government.

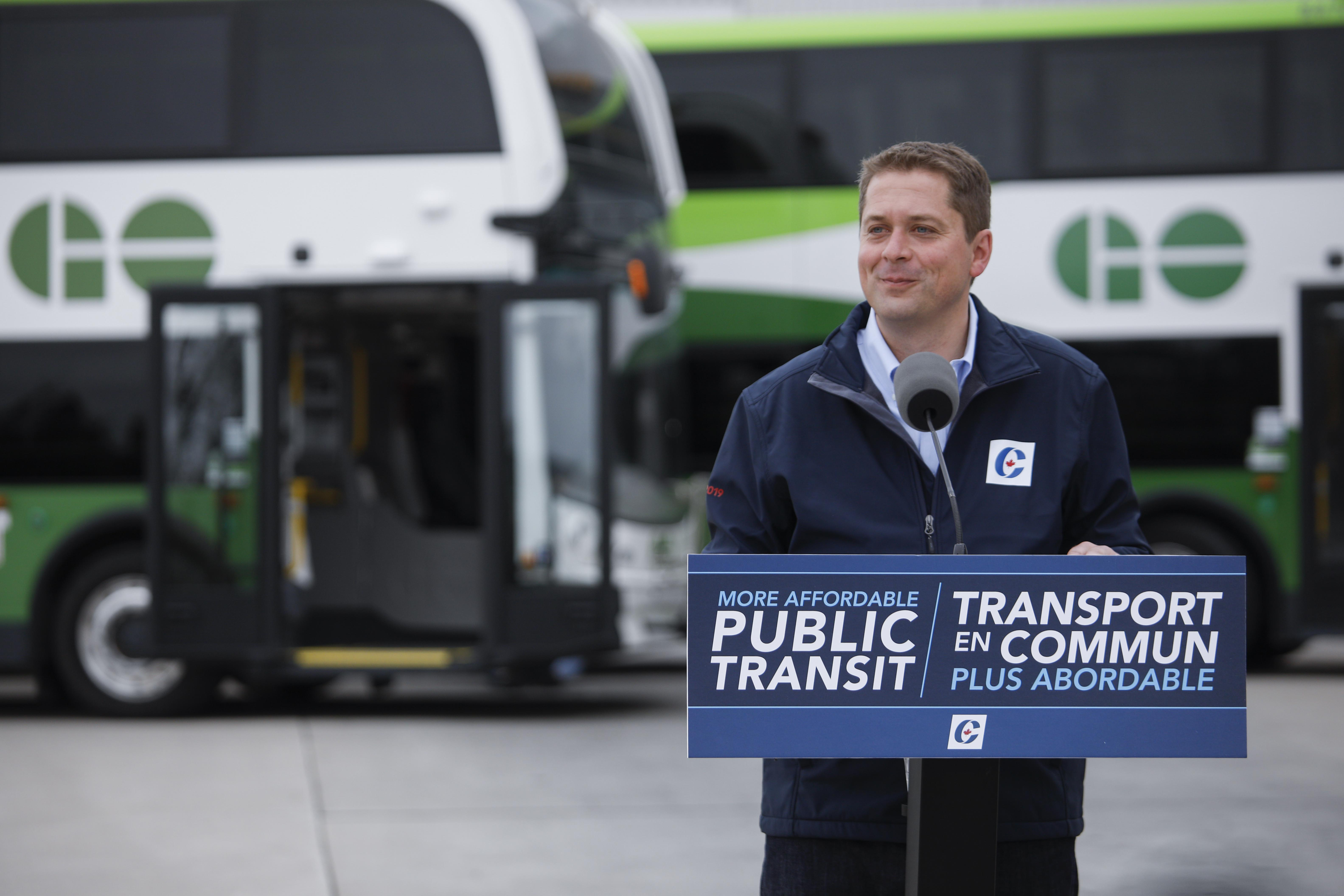
Scheer presenting his proposed Green Public Transit Tax Credit in Mississauga, September 2019

Scheer has proposed to restore the public transit tax credit, which the party says is part of its environment plan. The Green Public Transit Tax Credit, would refund transit users a 15 per cent credit on their taxes of the cost of a fare pass. Scheer has also promised to implement a Green Home Tax Credit, where homeowners could claim a 20 per cent refundable tax credit for spending between $1,000 and $20,000 on energy-efficient home renovations. The Conservative climate plan also promises a $250 million investment in a "green technology and innovation fund," that would leverage public and private funds to help green tech companies and entrepreneurs secure capital.

In October 2016, Scheer voted against the ratification of the Paris Agreement. However, he voted to reaffirm Canadian ratification on the Paris Agreement in June 2017. Pundits argued that his June 2017 vote was used as a way to avoid accusations comparing him to U.S. President Donald Trump, who pulled the United States out of the accord, a few days earlier.

Scheer told Le Soleil that he does not support a "war on cars" when supporting a tunnel between Quebec City and Levis.

=== Firearms ===
Scheer pledged that a Conservative government would extend the period of background checks to an individual's entire life instead of the current system of five years. He opposes a long-gun registry, opposes a proposed ban on handgun ownership, and has pledged to repeal the new regulations in the Liberal government's Bill C-71. Scheer has proposed to introduce legislation that classifies firearms, instead of giving the authority to cabinet or the Royal Canadian Mounted Police (RCMP).

=== Immigration ===
Scheer wants to prioritize helping those he considers the most vulnerable refugees, namely religious minorities like Christians in the Middle East who face death for conversion away from Islam. He prefers to help refugees integrate through private sponsorship instead of government sponsorship. He contends that the refugees who are currently struggling to find housing, jobs and language training do so because of the Liberal Party "using a devastating tragedy for political purposes".

In 2018, Scheer opposed the Global Compact for Migration.

=== Quebec ===
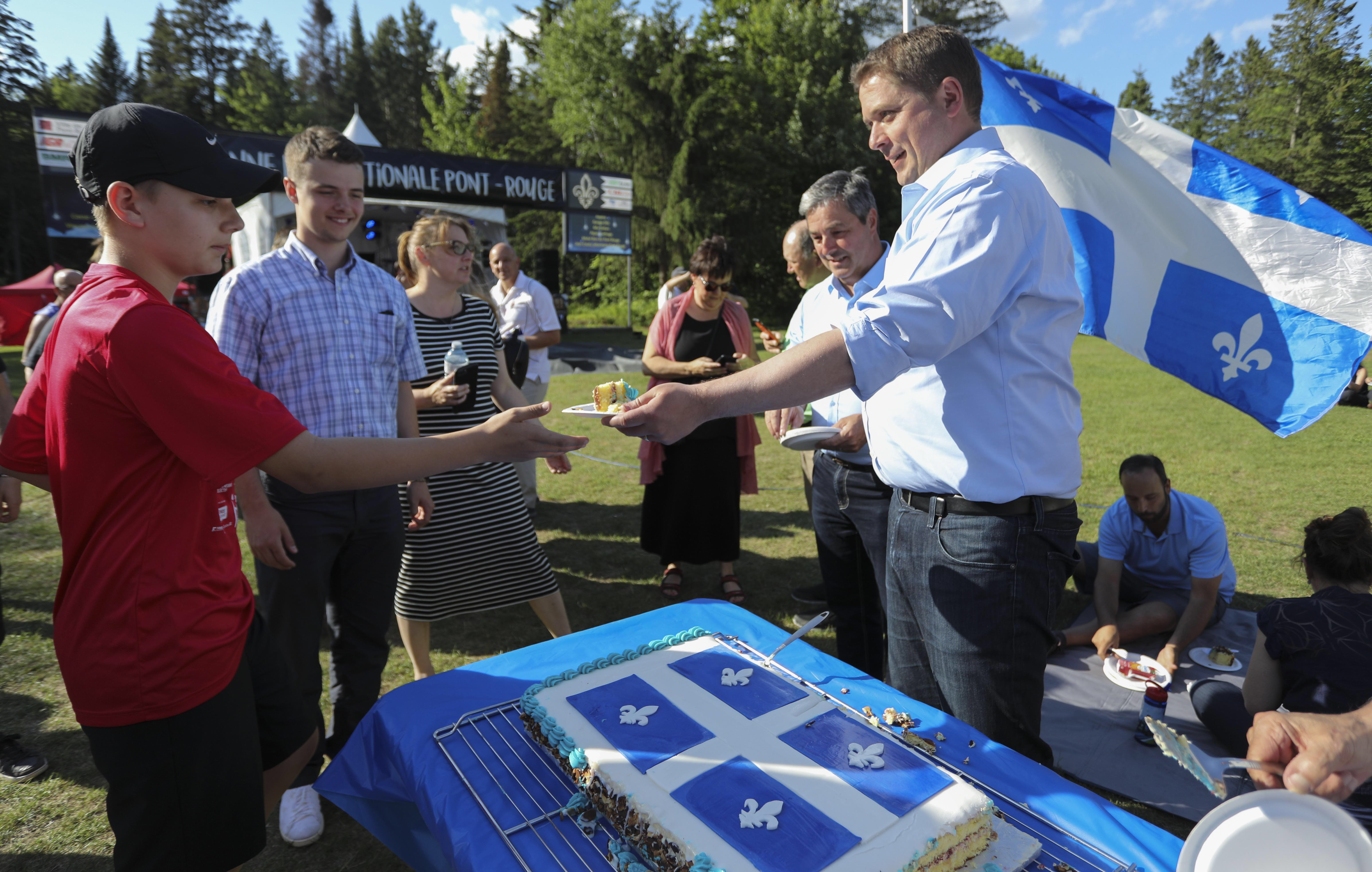
Scheer attending Saint-Jean-Baptiste Day festivities in Pont-Rouge, Quebec

On February 8, 2018, Scheer expressed good will towards opening the constitution in support of then-premier Philippe Couillard's proposal based around five conditions which were: the codification of a distinct society; limits on federal spending power; while guaranteeing representation on the Supreme Court; a constitutional veto right; and increased control over immigration to Quebec in the constitution. In May 2018, Scheer promised to advocate for a robust Quebec nationalism, and to give Quebec more control over immigration and culture as well as collecting then transferring their federal income tax.

On March 28, 2018, The Journal de Montréal revealed that Scheer's personal website was offered in English only. After the publication of the article, a French version of the site was created.

In August 2018 Scheer defended a woman with links to anti-immigration activist groups such as the Front Patriotique du Quebec and the Storm Alliance after Justin Trudeau denounced her questions.

=== Senate ===
Scheer opposes the non-partisan senate and has suggested that he would appoint people to the Senate "who share my goal of lowering taxes and growing the private sector". He also said "they would be Conservative senators who would implement the conservative vision for Canada".

On September 16, 2017, Scheer criticized Senator Lynn Beyak following her comments about Indigenous people. He stated that any decision to remove her would be made by the leader of the Conservatives in the Senate, Larry Smith. Beyak was eventually expelled from the caucus on January 4, 2018. Scheer has encouraged the Senate Conservative Caucus to block the passage of the Cannabis Act.

=== Social issues ===
Scheer is considered pro-life by the Campaign Life Coalition and "has an impeccable pro-life voting record" in the House of Commons. He has said that he will respect the Conservative Party's official policy on abortion, which currently states, "A Conservative government will not support any legislation to regulate abortion". Scheer reiterated his stance on abortion during a 2017 CBC News interview, stating that he still considers himself pro-life, but would not reopen the issue if he were prime minister. In 2008, he was disappointed when the Order of Canada was given to Henry Morgentaler, and annoyed that his award came on Canada Day. In 2018, Scheer accused the Liberal government of "imposing" the prime minister's views on upholding "women's rights and women's reproductive rights" when faith groups are applying for funding for summer jobs programs.

Scheer voted against Bill C-14, which allows practitioners to assist in the suicide of mentally competent adults with "enduring and intolerable suffering" in cases where death is "reasonably foreseeable".

Scheer was critical of Justin Trudeau's endorsement of comments made by Governor General Julie Payette on questioning people who support creationism stating that millions were "offended" by her comments.

Scheer has promised that universities or colleges "that do not foster a culture of free speech and inquiry on campus" will not receive federal funding under his government, though after the University of Toronto said it would not open space on its campus for an event hosted by the Canadian Nationalist Party, he stated "I respect the right for universities to determine which outside groups they give a platform to. And so that's within their purview" and that his policy would be based on "an objective set of criteria". When asked by cabinet member Kirsty Duncan if a school like St. Paul University blocking a film on abortion would fit in his criteria, Scheer said no.

During the 2004 election campaign, Scheer opposed same-sex marriage. As an individual MP, he publicly voiced his opposition in the House of Commons debate against recognizing same-sex marriage and voted in favour of a 2006 motion to reopen debate on the issue. Scheer has stated that, as leader of the Conservative caucus – where there is no consensus on the issue – he will not try to reopen the debate on same-sex marriage. In 2016, Scheer supported the removal of "traditional definition of marriage" from the conservative party policy book.

In 2005, Scheer defended Bishop Fred Henry's statements against the legalization of same-sex marriage, stating "to think that a Catholic bishop must answer to a civil authority over matters of faith is abominable. It is abhorrent to me, to other Catholics and to every member of every faith community."

==== Changes to the national anthem ====
Scheer voted against Bill C-210, which altered the lyrics of the national anthem to a gender-neutral form. When asked about his vote, he expressed disappointment on the bill's passing in 2016 and stated that he would sing the old version until the law received royal assent, which was the day after his comments.

==== Gender ====
Scheer describes himself as a feminist and advocates for a gender-diverse senior team stating, "I think the core of that is to recognize the fundamental equality between men and women."

On January 31, 2018, Scheer was asked if he had ever acted inappropriately in the past, in which he responded by "No", and "A good friend of mine when I first got elected said nothing good happens in Ottawa after 8:00pm and I've tried to live by that rule."

==== On misconduct of candidates for office ====
After it was revealed that the 2015 Conservative campaign team knew about sexual misconduct allegations against former Conservative MP Rick Dykstra, Scheer responded by stating he could not speak to "decisions made by past campaign teams". However, after Conservative MPs Maxime Bernier and Brad Trost called for an investigation into the party's handling of Dykstra's candidacy while Michelle Rempel criticized the party's decision, Scheer called for a third-party investigation on January 31, 2018. On February 6, 2018, Scheer declined to comment on the fate of those involved in the mishandling of the allegations against Dykstra during the 2015 election or say whether those involved remain welcome into the party.

==== Recreational drugs ====
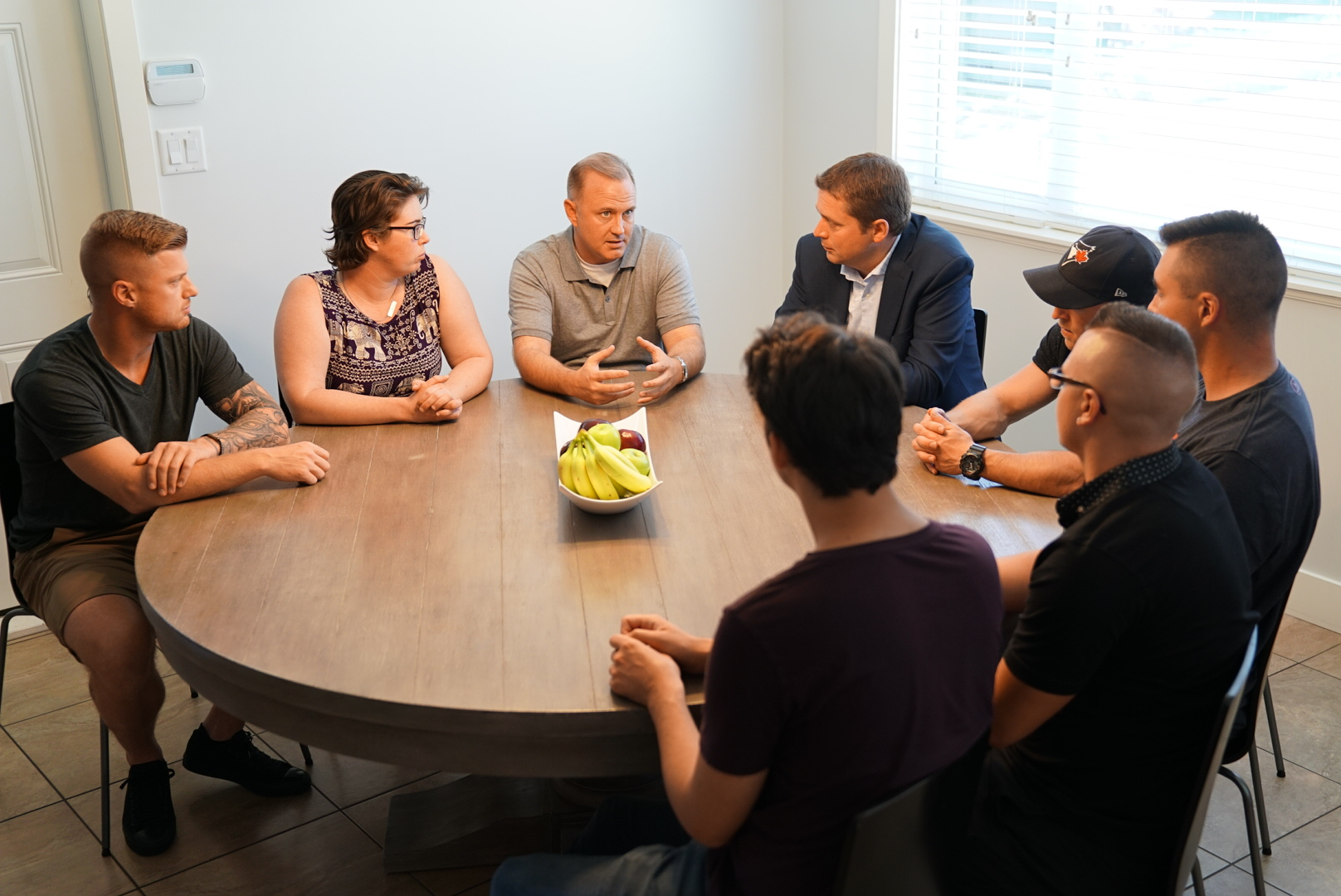
Scheer speaking with members of the Cedars Society, an organization that promotes recovery from drug addiction

When asked about his stance on Canada's potential legalization of marijuana in April 2017, he said though he is not in favour of the motion, "I am very realistic, and once it's legal in a short period of time there's going to be a lot of people that work for companies that distribute it ... so we have to be very realistic as a party." During the Chicoutimi—Le Fjord by-election, Scheer stated that he is opposed to the pending legalization of marijuana and made it an issue during the campaign. In an interview with Tout le Monde en Parle in May 2018, Scheer admitted that he had smoked marijuana when he was younger, but reinforced his opposition to the bill, and would not rule out the possibility to re-criminalize marijuana if he wins the election. However, in October 2018, Scheer stated that the Conservatives would not re-criminalize marijuana, noting how the Conservative Party "recognize the reality," of legal cannabis, and "do not intend to go back and make marijuana illegal again."

In the leadership race, Scheer accused Justin Trudeau of wanting to legalize heroin. He has also accused Health Minister Ginette Petitpas Taylor on Twitter of trying to "legalize" hard drugs which he corrected to "decriminalize". Scheer is critical of safe-injection sites arguing that "the government makes it quote unquote safer to inject illicit drugs". During the 2019 election, Scheer defended Conservative ads targeted at Chinese-Canadians that falsely claimed that the Liberals were planning to legalize all drugs.

=== Foreign policy ===
==== China ====
Scheer says he would not pursue a free trade agreement with China if he were prime minister, and he would ban Huawei from Canada's 5G network. He has criticized the Liberals for not ratifying the Trans-Pacific Partnership quickly enough.

==== Israel ====
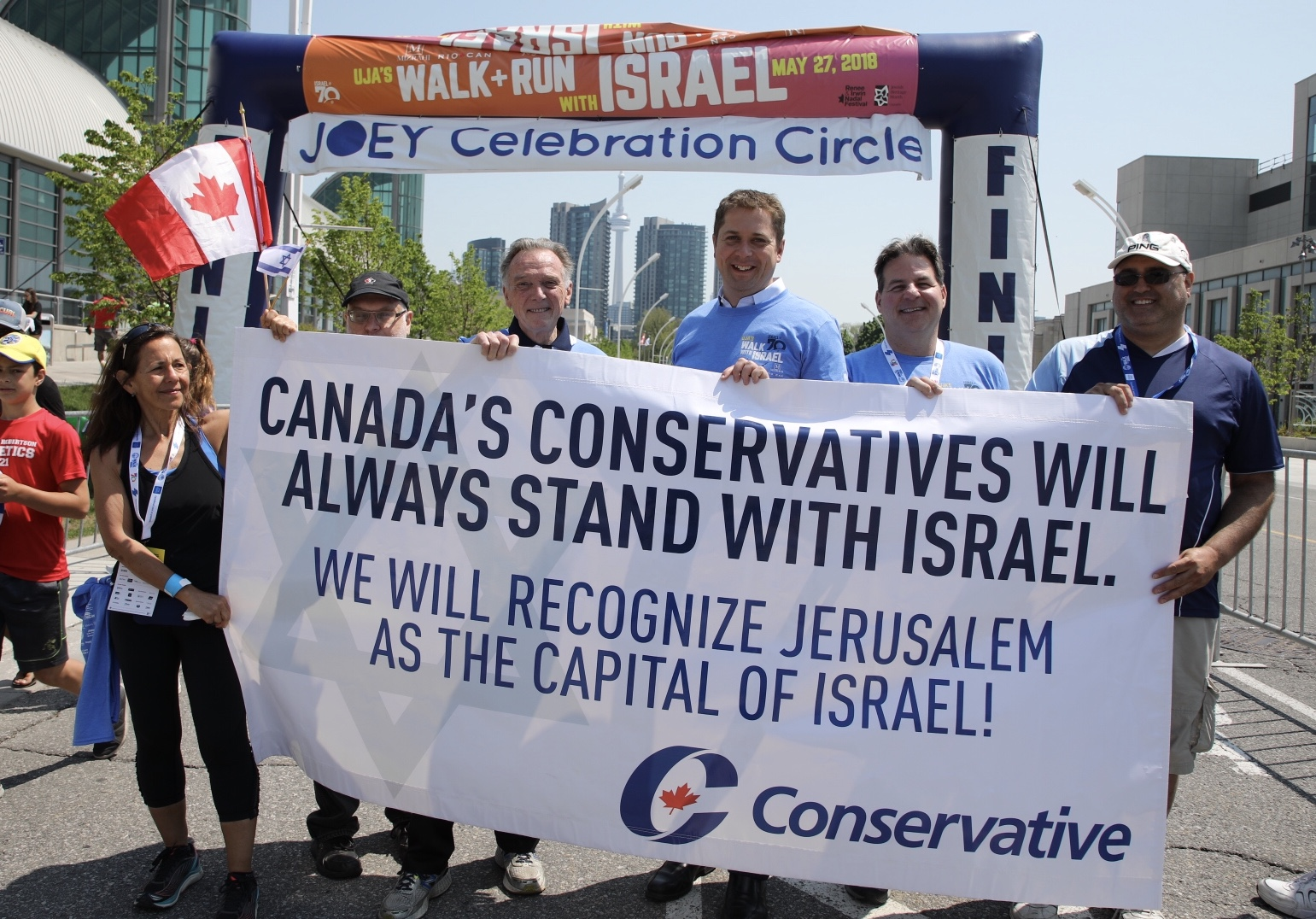
Scheer with a banner that states the Conservatives' position on the status of Jerusalem, during the UJA Federation march in Toronto, May 2018

In December 2017, when U.S. President Donald Trump announced his decision to recognize Jerusalem as Israel's capital, Scheer did not take a public position. However, on February 26, 2018, Scheer stated that a Conservative government – if elected in 2019 – would recognize Jerusalem as Israel's capital.

Scheer tweeted in May 2018 that he was "praying for the safety of the soldiers of the Israeli Defense Forces (IDF) and all Israelis tonight as they face missile attacks".

==== Saudi Arabia ====
After Prime Minister Justin Trudeau told CTV's "Question Period" that the government was examining means to block shipment of Canadian-built light-armoured vehicles to Saudi Arabia in protest of the brutal murder of journalist Jamal Khashoggi, Scheer stated that he firmly opposed any such move by the Liberal government. The arms sale to Saudi Arabia was brokered by the former Conservative government. Scheer has stated that Canada should ban the import of oil from Saudi Arabia due to human rights and environmental concerns. In 2018 Scheer demanded that the gender-based analysis requirement imposed on Canadian pipeline projects by the Liberal government be instead applied to oil imported from Saudi Arabia.

==== Ukraine ====
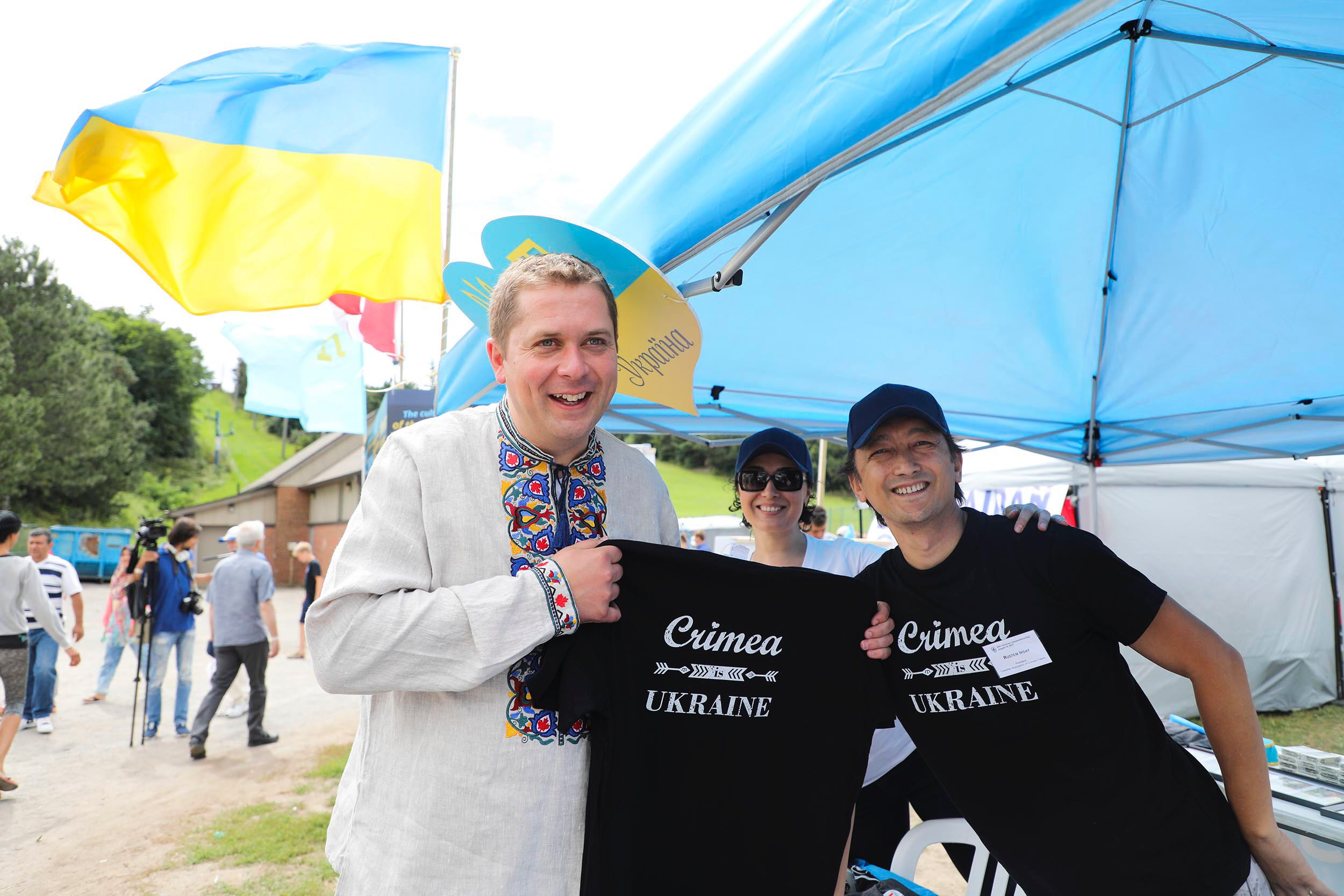
Scheer at a Ukraine Independence Day festival in Toronto, holding up a t-shirt that reads "Crimea is Ukraine"

Scheer was one of thirteen Canadians banned from travelling to Russia under retaliatory sanctions imposed by President Vladimir Putin in March 2014. Scheer supported sending peacekeepers to the Russian-Ukrainian border believing that "the defence of Ukraine's sovereignty and territorial integrity should be a priority for Canada's government on the international stage."

== Personal life ==
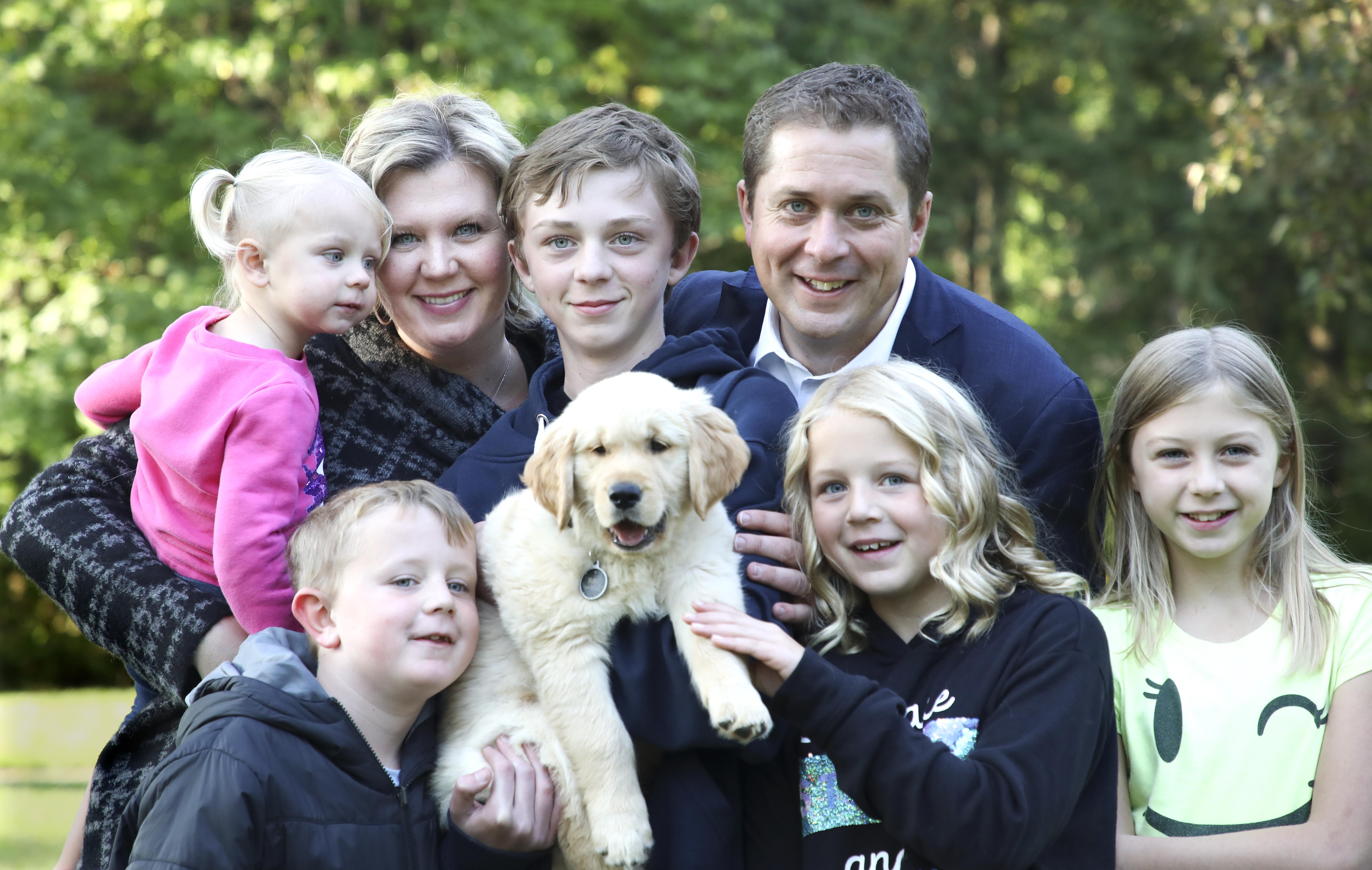
Scheer and his family in September 2018

Scheer married Jill Ryan at the Holy Rosary Cathedral in Regina in 2003. The couple have five children together. Scheer is a practising Catholic who attends Sunday mass and is an active member of the Knights of Columbus. His children attend a private faith-based school.

According to Global News, "Scheer's French is passable, but he's not fluently bilingual."

Scheer is a hunter and firearm owner. A gridiron football fan, Scheer supports the Seattle Seahawks and Saskatchewan Roughriders; his brother-in-law is professional football player Jon Ryan. Another of his wife's brothers, Steve Ryan, ran for the Saskatchewan NDP in the 2007 and 2011 provincial elections.

When he was speaker of the House of Commons from 2011 to 2015, he lived at the official residence, called the Farm, in the Gatineau Hills. When he was the leader of the Opposition, he lived in the Stornoway.

=== Dual citizenship ===
Scheer is a dual citizen, holding Canadian and U.S. citizenship, which he obtained through his American-born father. Scheer confirmed that he has filed U.S. tax returns and the party verified that he is registered for the draft under the U.S. Selective Service System, which is a list of individuals who can be conscripted into the U.S. military in the event of a national emergency. Scheer denied that he had been hiding this information, but rather stated that he had never been asked about his dual citizenship, nor about having an American-born parent, before the information was revealed by The Globe and Mail during the 2019 federal election campaign. During the election campaign he indicated that he was in the process of renouncing his American citizenship, but following the campaign in May 2020, he announced that he no longer plans to renounce his American citizenship, as he will not be prime minister.

== Honours ==
Ribbon	Description	Notes
	Queen Elizabeth II Diamond Jubilee Medal for Canada	Andrew Scheer was awarded the medal as a member of the Canadian order of precedence on 6 February 2012.

- He was sworn in as a member of the Queen's Privy Council for Canada on September 25, 2017, upon his appointment as leader of the Official Opposition. This gave him the honorific title "The Honourable" and the post-nominal letters "PC" for Life.

== Electoral record ==
=== Federal ===
2025 Canadian federal election: Regina—Qu'Appelle
Party	Candidate	Votes	%	±%	Expenditures
Conservative	Andrew Scheer	27,024	64.0	+2.1	
Liberal	Rahima Mian	11,391	27.0	+16.9	
New Democratic	Chris Simmie	3,388	8.0	-12.9	
People's	Dionne Fehler	441	1.0	-4.1	
Total valid votes/expense limit		42,244	99.2		
Total rejected ballots		324	0.8		
Turnout		42,568	65.8		
Eligible voters		64,777			
Conservative hold		Swing		+2.1	
Source: Elections Canada

2021 Canadian federal election: Regina—Qu'Appelle
Party	Candidate	Votes	%	±%	Expenditures
Conservative	Andrew Scheer	20,400	61.9	-1.2	$91,531.28
New Democratic	Annaliese Bos	6,879	20.9	+1.1	$2,979.46
Liberal	Cecilia Melanson	3,344	10.1	-1.6	$2,031.08
People's	Andrew Yubeta	1,668	5.1	+3.8	$4,045.00
Green	Naomi Hunter	668	2.0	-1.3	$9,007.92
Total valid votes/expense limit		32,959	99.2	–	$106,873.27
Total rejected ballots		254	0.8		
Turnout		33,213	60.0		
Eligible voters		55,401			
Conservative hold		Swing		-1.2	
Source: Elections Canada

2019 Canadian federal election: Regina—Qu'Appelle
Party	Candidate	Votes	%	±%	Expenditures
Conservative	Andrew Scheer	24,463	63.12	+18.42	$51,267.61
New Democratic	Ray Aldinger	7,685	19.83	-10.38	$2,559.68
Liberal	Jordan Ames-Sinclair	4,543	11.72	-11.06	$8,859.46
Green	Dale Dewar	1,282	3.31	+1.00	$4,459.24
People's	Tracey Sparrowhawk	513	1.32	–	none listed
Libertarian	James Plummer	116	0.30	–	$3.05
Independent	Kieran Szuchewycz	78	0.20	–	$0.00
Rhinoceros	Éric Normand	75	0.19	–	none listed
Total valid votes/expense limit		38,755	99.17	–	$103,664.70
Total rejected ballots		323	0.83	+0.41	
Turnout		38,078	69.27	+0.99	
Eligible voters		56,412			
Conservative hold		Swing		+14.40	
Source: Elections Canada

2015 Canadian federal election: Regina—Qu'Appelle
Party	Candidate	Votes	%	±%	Expenditures
Conservative	Andrew Scheer	16,486	44.70	-8.49	$118,170.22
New Democratic	Nial Kuyek	11,144	30.21	-8.44	$65,386.08
Liberal	Della Anaquod	8,401	22.78	+18.02	$21,967.01
Green	Greg Chatterson	852	2.31	-0.67	$3,114.91
Total valid votes/expense limit		36,883	99.59		$202,239.34
Total rejected ballots		152	0.41	–	
Turnout		37,035	68.28	–	
Eligible voters		54,240			
Conservative hold		Swing		-0.03	
Source: Elections Canada

2011 Canadian federal election: Regina—Qu'Appelle
Party	Candidate	Votes	%	±%	Expenditures
Conservative	Andrew Scheer	15,896	53.5	+1.8	$78,726
New Democratic	Fred Clipsham	11,419	38.4	+6.3	$63,800
Liberal	Jackie Miller	1,400	4.7	-5.8	$15,991
Green	Greg Chatterson	879	3.0	-2.8	$9,100
Independent	Jeff Breti	127	0.4	–	$18,116
Total valid votes/expense limit		29,721	100.0		$81,793
Total rejected ballots		97	0.3	0.0	
Turnout		29,818	61.7	+4	
Eligible voters		48,300	–	–	
Conservative hold		Swing		-2.25	

2008 Canadian federal election: Regina—Qu'Appelle
Party	Candidate	Votes	%	±%	Expenditures
Conservative	Andrew Scheer	14,068	51.7	+10.4	$78,480
New Democratic	Janice Bernier	8,699	32.1	-0.3	$44,446
Liberal	Rod Flaman	2,809	10.5	-12.7	$17,222
Green	Greg Chatterson	1,556	5.8	+2.5	$8,194
Total valid votes/expense limit		27,135	100.0		$78,949
Total rejected ballots		81	0.3	0.0	
Turnout		27,213	57	-7	
Conservative hold		Swing		+5.35	

2006 Canadian federal election: Regina—Qu'Appelle
Party	Candidate	Votes	%	±%	Expenditures
Conservative	Andrew Scheer	12,753	41.3	+5.5	$71,773
New Democratic	Lorne Nystrom	10,041	32.4	-0.3	$50,501
Liberal	Allyce Herle	7,134	23.1	-4.7	$68,287
Green	Brett Dolter	1,016	3.3	+1.0	$545
Total valid votes		30,944	100.0		–
Total rejected ballots		93	0.3	0.0	
Turnout		31,037	64	+8	
Conservative hold		Swing		+2.90	

=== Municipal ===
2000 Ottawa-Carleton Catholic School Board election: Zone 9 (River/Capital)
Candidate	Votes	%
Kathy Ablett	2,151	46.97
Catherine Maguire-Urban	1,609	35.13
Andrew Scheer	820	17.90

Parliament of Canada
Preceded by Lorne Nystrom	Member of Parliament for Regina-Qu'Appelle; 2004–present	Incumbent
Political offices
Preceded by Bill Blaikie	Deputy Speaker of the House of Commons; 2008–2011	Succeeded by Denise Savoie
Preceded by Peter Milliken	Speaker of the House of Commons; 2011–2015	Succeeded by Geoff Regan
Preceded by Peter Julian	Leader of the Opposition in the House of Commons; 2015–2016	Succeeded by Candice Bergen
Preceded by Rona Ambrose	Leader of the Opposition; 2017–2020	Succeeded by Erin O'Toole
Preceded by Pierre Poilievre	Leader of the Opposition; 2025–2025	Succeeded by Pierre Poilievre
Party political offices
Preceded by Rona Ambrose; Interim	Leader of the Conservative Party; 2017–2020	Succeeded by Erin O'Toole
