= Dave Batters =

Canadian businessman and politician (1969-2009)

David Batters MP

Member of Parliament for Palliser
- In office June 28, 2004 – September 7, 2008
- Preceded by: Dick Proctor
- Succeeded by: Ray Boughen

Personal details
- Born: July 12, 1969 Estevan, Saskatchewan, Canada
- Died: June 29, 2009 (aged 39) Regina, Saskatchewan, Canada
- Party: Conservative
- Spouse(s): Denise Batters (m. 1997–2009)
- Education: University of Saskatchewan
- Profession: Pharmaceutical representative

David Batters (July 12, 1969 – June 29, 2009) was a Canadian businessman and politician. Batters was a member of the Conservative Party of Canada in the House of Commons of Canada, representing the riding of Palliser from 2004 to 2008.

== Early life and career ==
Born in Estevan, Saskatchewan, Batters worked in the health care field as a pharmaceutical representative with Pfizer Inc., and as a political assistant to Grant Devine. He earned a Bachelor of Arts in political studies from the University of Saskatchewan.

== Political career ==
Batters was a supporter of the Tackling Violent Crime Act (Bill C-2), which sought tougher penalties for gun crimes and impaired driving and provided new ways to detect drug impaired driving. Batters successfully pressured the federal Liberal government during his term to reclassify crystal meth as a Schedule 1 drug (the most serious category) under the Controlled Drugs and Substances Act. Batters' efforts also helped to secure $15 million in federal funding for the Moose Jaw Multiplex project and to secure the safe return of Saskatchewan residents from New Orleans during Hurricane Katrina. In March 2006, he questioned Health Canada on its strategy concerning Fetal Alcohol Spectrum Disorder, which he believed was more prominent in First Nations communities and would be beneficial to distribute pamphlets on FASD to people on reserves in their childbearing years. At the beginning of 2008, he urged the president of Telefilm Canada not to fund films that were objectionable and supported Bill C-10.

Batters stated that one of his motivations for entering politics was the murder of his friend Michelle Lenius on November 4, 2003 by her estranged husband. In April 2008, he proposed an amendment to the Criminal Code called "Michelle's Law" that would make it more difficult for anyone accused of committing a personal injury to get bail.

Batters was admitted to hospital on July 1, 2008. He announced on September 1, 2008 that he would not be running in the 2008 election because of a battle with depression that included an addiction to benzodiazepines.

== Death ==
On June 29, 2009, Batters died by suicide in his Regina home, according to a release from his family. The Regina Police had arrived at his home hours earlier, after receiving a report that he was threatening to harm himself. At the time of his death, he was married to Denise Batters, who was later named to the Senate of Canada by Prime Minister Stephen Harper in 2013.

Several of his former colleagues, including Conservative MPs Tom Lukiwski, Jay Hill and Andrew Scheer and Liberal MP Ralph Goodale, paid tribute to Batters following his death. At his funeral, Harper spoke of the need for greater public understanding of, and compassion for, the struggles faced by sufferers of anxiety and depression.
