= Ray Boughen =

Canadian politician (1937–2022)

Ray Boughen MP

Member of Parliament for Palliser
- In office October 14, 2008 – October 19, 2015
- Preceded by: Dave Batters
- Succeeded by: district abolished

Personal details
- Born: May 25, 1937 Coronach, Saskatchewan, Canada
- Died: December 24, 2022 (aged 85)
- Party: Conservative
- Profession: Education

Ray Boughen (May 25, 1937 – December 24, 2022) was a Canadian politician who was mayor of Moose Jaw, Saskatchewan, and a Member of Parliament.

Prior to politics, Boughen worked in education as a teacher and principal. From 1994 to 2000, he was mayor of Moose Jaw.

Boughen was elected to represent the electoral district of Palliser in the 2008 Canadian federal election. He was a member of the Conservative Party and served in parliament until his retirement at the 2015 election.

Boughen died on December 24, 2022, at the age of 85.
