= Larry Spencer =

Canadian politician and pastor

Member of Parliament for Regina—Lumsden—Lake Centre
- In office 2000–2004
- Preceded by: John Solomon
- Succeeded by: Tom Lukiwski

Personal details
- Born: December 21, 1941 Stockton, Missouri, U.S.
- Died: March 14, 2022 (aged 80)
- Party: Christian Heritage Party of Canada
- Other political affiliations: Canadian Alliance (2000–2003); Independent (2003–2004)
- Spouse: Sue Brown
- Profession: Pastor

Larry Spencer (December 21, 1941—March 14, 2022) is a Baptist pastor in Canada, and former Member of Parliament (MP) for the Saskatchewan riding of Regina—Lumsden—Lake Centre. He later served as interim national president of the Christian Heritage Party of Canada.

== Biography ==
Spencer was born in Stockton, Missouri, United States, in 1942. He worked in Kansas City, Missouri, for Hallmark Cards after graduating from Sheldon High School. He left Hallmark after eight years, and in 1967 worked as a farm hand. He moved to Canada in 1974, after responding to a request to come to Saskatchewan as a church planner for the Regina, Saskatchewan, area. He established Discovery Baptist Church in Regina in 1978 and now assists at Calvary Baptist Church in Moose Jaw, Saskatchewan, where he now resides.

He is married to Sue Brown, whom he met in high school.

== Member of Parliament ==
He was first elected as candidate of Canadian Alliance in the 2000 federal election. He was appointed family issues critic for the CA caucus, but was later suspended from the caucus for his controversial remarks. When the CA merged into the new Conservative Party of Canada, he did not join the caucus of the new party, and thus became an independent. He sought re-election in the 2004 federal election as an independent conservative, but lost.

=== Views on homosexuality ===
In late November 2003, Spencer caused controversy in Canada by Vancouver Sun reporter Peter O'Neil when he said that he would support any initiative to outlaw homosexuality. He stated that in the 1960s, a "well-orchestrated" conspiracy began and led to recent successes in the gay rights movement. This conspiracy, he further said, included seducing and recruiting young boys in playgrounds and locker rooms, and deliberately infiltrating North America's schools, judiciaries, entertainment industries, and religious communities. According to him, this conspiracy started with a speech given by a U.S. gay rights activist in the 1960s whose name he could not remember. Spencer stated:

His quote went something like this ... "We will seduce your sons in the locker rooms, in the gymnasiums, in the hallways, in the playgrounds, and on and on, in this land." It was quite a long quote stating what was going to happen to the young boys of North America.

Spencer further blamed former Canadian prime-minister Pierre Elliott Trudeau for the "movement" gaining public acceptance since he legalized homosexuality in Canada in 1969. He mentioned that although no government would have the courage to strike down these laws, and that he would support any initiative that advocated such a move.

He also feared that "Polygamy is next on the list. More than one [spouse] ... We'll see that within the next very, very few years. Pedophilia is being pursued as we speak ... Some will say down to an eight-year-old, they think it's OK."

He believed that gay people can rid themselves of homosexuality if they put their minds to it.

As a result of his comments, Spencer was stripped of his job as family issues critic by Canadian Alliance leader Stephen Harper on November 27, 2003. He also temporarily removed himself from the party's caucus, and apologized "completely and without reservation" for his remarks.

He has written a book, Sacrificed: Truth or Politics telling of his experience as an MP and how he was treated by the Canadian Alliance and the Canadian press.
