= Regina—Lumsden—Lake Centre =

Former federal electoral district in Saskatchewan, Canada

Saskatchewan electoral district
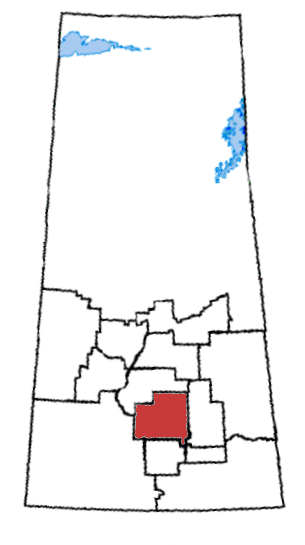
- Regina—Lumsden—Lake Centre in relation to other Saskatchewan federal electoral districts
- Coordinates: 51.127°N 105.376°W

Defunct federal electoral district
- Legislature: House of Commons
- District created: 1996
- District abolished: 2013
- First contested: 1997
- Last contested: 2011
- District webpage: profile, map

Demographics
- Population (2011): 70,276
- Electors (2011): 49,937
- Area (km²): 14,067.68
- Census division(s): Regina
- Census subdivision(s): Regina, Lumsden, Davidson

Regina—Lumsden—Lake Centre (formerly known as Regina—Arm River) was a federal electoral district in Saskatchewan, Canada, that was represented in the House of Commons of Canada from 1997 to 2015.

== Geography ==
The district included the northwestern part of the city of Regina and extended outward from Regina to Nokomis in the north, Davidson in the northwest and Tugaske in the west.

== History ==
The electoral district was created as "Regina—Arm River" in 1996 from Regina—Lumsden and portions of Moose Jaw—Lake Centre, Mackenzie and Regina—Qu'Appelle ridings.

In 1997, its name was changed to "Regina—Lumsden—Lake Centre".

The riding was dissolved in the 2012 Canadian federal electoral redistribution, redistributed between Regina—Lewvan, Regina—Qu'Appelle, and Moose Jaw—Lake Centre—Lanigan.

== Members of Parliament ==
Parliament	Years	Member	Party
Regina—Arm River; Riding created from Regina—Lumsden, Moose Jaw—Lake Centre, Mackenzie and Regina—Qu'Appelle
36th	1997–2000	John Solomon	New Democratic
Riding renamed — Regina—Lumsden—Lake Centre
37th	2000–2003	Larry Spencer	Alliance
37th	2003–2004	Larry Spencer	Conservative
37th	2004–2004	Larry Spencer	Independent
38th	2004–2006	Tom Lukiwski	Conservative
39th	2006–2008	Tom Lukiwski	Conservative
40th	2008–2011	Tom Lukiwski	Conservative
41st	2011–2015	Tom Lukiwski	Conservative
Riding dissolved into Moose Jaw—Lake Centre—Lanigan, Regina—Qu'Appelle and Regina—Lewvan

== Election results ==
2011 Canadian federal election
Party	Candidate	Votes	%	±%	Expenditures
Conservative	Tom Lukiwski	18,076	53.2	+2.1	$76,585
New Democratic	Brian Sklar	12,518	36.2	+7.7	$21,302
Liberal	Monica Lysack	2,467	7.3	-7.6	$44,964
Green	Billy Patterson	911	2.7	-2.8	$195
Total valid votes/Expense limit		33,972	100.0		$83,129
Total rejected ballots		89	0.3	0.0	
Turnout		34,061	67.6	+5	
Eligible voters		50,387	–	–	

2008 Canadian federal election
Party	Candidate	Votes	%	±%	Expenditures
Conservative	Tom Lukiwski	16,053	51.1	+8.9	$68,988
New Democratic	Fred Kress	8,963	28.5	-0.4	$16,804
Liberal	Monica Lysack	4,668	14.9	-11.3	$47,936
Green	Nicolas Stulberg	1,737	5.5	+3.2	$3,513
Total valid votes/Expense limit		31,421	100.0		$80,038
Total rejected ballots		83	0.3	+0.1	
Turnout		31,504	63	-5	

2006 Canadian federal election
Party	Candidate	Votes	%	±%	Expenditures
Conservative	Tom Lukiwski	14,176	42.1	+8.9	$60,131
New Democratic	Moe Kovatch	9,467	28.1	+1.3	$47,556
Liberal	Gary J. Anderson	8,956	26.6	-6.2	$73,596
Green	William Sorochan	1,035	3.1	+0.8	$730
Total valid votes		33,634	100.0		–
Total rejected ballots		73	0.2	-0.1	
Turnout		33,707	68	+5	

2004 Canadian federal election
Party	Candidate	Votes	%	±%	Expenditures
Conservative	Tom Lukiwski	10,290	33.2	-9.7	$57,639
Liberal	Gary J. Anderson	10,167	32.8	+18.8	$53,396
New Democratic	Moe Kovatch	8,300	26.8	-15.6	$60,642
Independent	Larry Spencer	1,506	4.9	–	$21,488
Green	Fiorindo Agi	716	2.3	–	
Total valid votes		30,978	100.0		–
Total rejected ballots		79	0.3	-0.1	
Turnout		31,057	63	0	

2000 Canadian federal election
Party	Candidate	Votes	%	±%	Expenditures
Alliance	Larry Spencer	12,585	42.9	+15.1	$58,054
New Democratic	John Solomon	12,424	42.4	+0.1	$53,957
Liberal	Hem Juttla	4,296	14.6	-9.0	$22,758
Total valid votes		29,305	100.0		–
Total rejected ballots		113	0.4	+0.1	
Turnout		29,418	63	-3	

1997 Canadian federal election
Party	Candidate	Votes	%	±%	Expenditures
New Democratic	John Solomon	12,677	42.3	–	$58,862
Reform	G.A. Gerry Fuller	8,342	27.8	–	$15,205
Liberal	Kevin Clarke	7,079	23.6	–	$36,554
Progressive Conservative	R. Wayne Slinn	1,605	5.4	–	$984
Canadian Action	John MacGowan	277	0.9	–	$1,940
Total valid votes		29,980	100.0		–
Total rejected ballots		96	0.3		
Turnout		30,076	66		

== See also ==
- List of Canadian electoral districts
- Historical federal electoral districts of Canada
