= Palliser (Saskatchewan electoral district) =

Former federal electoral district in Saskatchewan, Canada

Saskatchewan electoral district
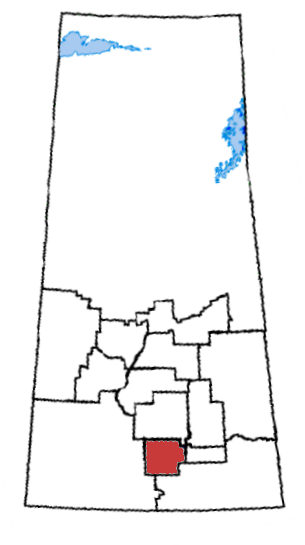
- Palliser in relation to other Saskatchewan federal electoral districts
- Coordinates: 50.183°N 105.287°W

Defunct federal electoral district
- Legislature: House of Commons
- District created: 1996
- District abolished: 2013
- First contested: 1997
- Last contested: 2011
- District webpage: profile, map

Demographics
- Population (2011): 68,544
- Electors (2011): 50,094
- Area (km²): 7,486.76
- Census subdivision(s): Regina, Moose Jaw

Palliser was a federal electoral district in Saskatchewan, Canada, that was represented in the House of Commons of Canada from 1997 to 2015. It was named in honour of John Palliser, a geographer and explorer of the Canadian West.

== Geography ==
It included the city of Moose Jaw, the southwest quadrant of the city of Regina and the rural areas around them.

== History ==
The electoral district was created in 1996 from Moose Jaw—Lake Centre and parts of Regina—Lumsden, Regina—Wascana and Swift Current—Maple Creek—Assiniboia ridings.

The Conservative Party of Canada took back this historically New Democratic Party (NDP) seat in 2004.

Following the Canadian federal electoral redistribution, 2012, the riding was abolished. The Regina portion became part of the new riding of Regina—Lewvan, while Moose Jaw and the rural portion became part of Moose Jaw—Lake Centre—Lanigan. Small parts of the riding were transferred to Cypress Hills—Grasslands and Regina—Qu'Appelle.

== Members of Parliament ==
Parliament	Years	Member	Party
Palliser; Riding created from Moose Jaw—Lake Centre, Regina—Lumsden, Regina—Wascana and Swift Current—Maple Creek—Assiniboia
36th	1997–2000	Dick Proctor	New Democratic
37th	2000–2004	Dick Proctor	New Democratic
38th	2004–2006	Dave Batters	Conservative
39th	2006–2008	Dave Batters	Conservative
40th	2008–2011	Ray Boughen	Conservative
41st	2011–2015	Ray Boughen	Conservative
Riding dissolved into Moose Jaw—Lake Centre—Lanigan, Cypress Hills—Grasslands, Regina—Lewvan and Regina—Qu'Appelle

== Election results ==
2011 Canadian federal election
Party	Candidate	Votes	%	±%	Expenditures
Conservative	Ray Boughen	15,850	47.00	+3.01	$79,591
New Democratic	Noah Evanchuk	15,084	44.73	+10.96	$68,063
Liberal	Russell Collicott	1,797	5.33	-11.72	$23,336
Green	Larissa Shasko	995	2.95	-2.23	$921
Total valid votes/expense limit		33,726	100.00		$80,114
Total rejected ballots		93	0.27	-0.13	
Turnout		33,819	68.51	+4.51	
Eligible voters		49,362	–	–	

2008 Canadian federal election
Party	Candidate	Votes	%	±%	Expenditures
Conservative	Ray Boughen	14,159	43.99	+1.01	$65,034
New Democratic	Don Mitchell	10,865	33.77	+0.73	$63,072
Liberal	Calvin Johnston	5,489	17.05	-3.15	$60,000
Green	Larissa Shasko	1,580	5.18	+1.78	$213
Total valid votes/expense limit		32,093	100.00		$77,498
Total rejected ballots		143	0.4	–	
Turnout		32,236	64	-5	

2006 Canadian federal election
Party	Candidate	Votes	%	±%	Expenditures
Conservative	Dave Batters	14,906	42.98	+7.13	$71,895
New Democratic	Jo-Anne Dusel	11,400	33.04	-2.43	$63,803
Liberal	John Williams	7,006	20.20	-4.61	$35,782
Green	Larissa Shasko	1,182	3.40	+0.91	$550
Canadian Action	Marcia Fogal	120	0.34	–	–
Total valid votes/expense limit		34,614	100.00		–
Total rejected ballots			–	–	
Turnout		34,614	69.1	+4.7	

2004 Canadian federal election
Party	Candidate	Votes	%	±%	Expenditures
Conservative	Dave Batters	11,909	35.85	-5.59	$69,479
New Democratic	Dick Proctor	11,785	35.47	-2.68	$62,385
Liberal	John Williams	8,244	24.81	+4.40	$41,057
Green	Brian Rands	829	2.49	–	–
Christian Heritage	Harold Stephan	451	1.35	–	$720
Total valid votes/expense limit		33,218	100.00		–
Total rejected ballots		108	0.32	+0.01	
Turnout		33,326	64.42	-0.32	

Note: Conservative vote is compared to the total of Progressive Conservative and Canadian Alliance vote in 2000.

2000 Canadian federal election
Party	Candidate	Votes	%	±%	Expenditures
New Democratic Party	Dick Proctor	12,136	38.15	-0.06	$54,888
Alliance	Don Findlay	11,927	37.50	+8.31	$55,442
Liberal	Garry Johnson	6,492	20.41	-2.66	$60,150
Progressive Conservative	Brent Shirkey	1,248	3.92	-4.53	$1,603
Total valid votes		31,803	100.00		
Total rejected ballots		99	0.31	-0.27	
Turnout		31,902	62.74	-4.51	

Note: Canadian Alliance vote is compared to the Reform vote in 1997.

1997 Canadian federal election
Party	Candidate	Votes	%	±%	Expenditures
New Democratic Party	Dick Proctor	12,553	38.21		$49,066
Reform	Alene Tanner	9,590	29.19		$29,487
Liberal	Tony Merchant	7,579	23.07		$50,830
Progressive Conservative	Andy McDougall	2,777	8.45		$10,066
Natural Law	Jack Heilman	350	1.06		
Total valid votes		32,846	100.00		
Total rejected ballots		193	0.58		
Turnout		33,042	67.35		

== See also ==
- List of Canadian electoral districts
- Historical federal electoral districts of Canada
