= Fraser Tolmie =

Canadian politician

Fraser Tolmie MP

Member of Parliament for Moose Jaw—Lake Centre—Lanigan
- Incumbent
- Assumed office September 20, 2021
- Preceded by: Tom Lukiwski

Mayor of Moose Jaw, Saskatchewan
- In office 2016–2021
- Preceded by: Deb Higgins
- Succeeded by: Clive Tolley

Personal details
- Party: Conservative
- Occupation: Politician

Fraser Tolmie is a Canadian politician who was elected to represent the riding of Moose Jaw—Lake Centre—Lanigan in the House of Commons of Canada in the 2021 Canadian federal election.

== Background ==
Prior to his election to Parliament, Tolmie served as mayor of Moose Jaw, Saskatchewan from 2016 to 2021. He was a city councillor of Moose Jaw from 2009 to 2012.

Tolmie was an officer with the Royal Canadian Air Force.

He obtained a degree in War Studies/Strategic Thought and Conflict Resolution at King's College London.

== Electoral record ==
2025 Canadian federal election: Moose Jaw—Lake Centre—Lanigan
** Preliminary results — Not yet official **
Party	Candidate	Votes	%	±%	Expenditures
New Democratic	Britt Baumann				
People's	Chey Craik				
Green	Mike Gardiner				
Liberal	Tabitha Mukamusoni				
Conservative	Fraser Tolmie				
Total valid votes/expense limit					
Total rejected ballots					
Turnout					
Eligible voters					
Source: Elections Canada

2021 Canadian federal election: Moose Jaw—Lake Centre—Lanigan
Party	Candidate	Votes	%	±%	Expenditures
Conservative	Fraser Tolmie	24,869	60.4	-10.7	$64,739.58
New Democratic	Talon Regent	7,975	19.4	+2.4	$17,715.39
People's	Chey Craik	4,712	11.4	+7.8	$29,568.05
Liberal	Katelyn Zimmer	2,526	6.1	+0.5	$7,798.44
Maverick	D. Craig Townsend	664	1.6	-	$2,514.26
Green	Isaiah Hunter	438	1.1	–1.5	$0.00
Total valid votes/expense limit		41,184	99.96	+0.6	$117,516.56
Total rejected ballots		206	0.04	-0.6	
Turnout		41,184	69.32	-6.52	
Eligible voters		59,414			
Conservative hold		Swing		-6.55%	
Source: Elections Canada
