= Moose Jaw—Lake Centre—Lanigan =

Federal electoral district in Saskatchewan, Canada

Saskatchewan electoral district
- Interactive map of riding boundaries from the 2025 federal election. Points indicate the city of Moose Jaw and the town of Lanigan.

Federal electoral district
- Legislature: House of Commons
MP
Fraser Tolmie
Conservative
- District created: 2013
- First contested: 2015
- Last contested: 2025
- District webpage: profile, map

Demographics
- Population (2011): 76,106
- Electors (2015): 56,621
- Area (km²): 32,882
- Pop. density (per km²): 2.3
- Census division(s): Division No. 6, Division No. 7, Division No. 11
- Census subdivision(s): Moose Jaw, Outlook, Dundurn, Lumsden (part), Watrous, Lumsden, Lanigan, Regina Beach, Sherwood (part), Moose Jaw

Moose Jaw—Lake Centre—Lanigan is a federal electoral district in Saskatchewan, Canada, represented in the House of Commons of Canada since 2015. It encompasses a portion of Saskatchewan formerly included in the electoral districts of Blackstrap, Palliser, Regina—Lumsden—Lake Centre, Souris—Moose Mountain, Wascana and Saskatoon—Humboldt.

Moose Jaw—Lake Centre—Lanigan was created by the 2012 federal electoral boundaries redistribution and was legally defined in the 2013 representation order. It came into effect after the 2015 Canadian federal election was called.

== Demographics ==
Panethnic groups in Moose Jaw—Lake Centre—Lanigan (2011−2021)
Panethnic group	2021		2016		2011	
Panethnic group	Pop.	%	Pop.	%	Pop.	%
European (Note: Statistic includes all persons that did not make up part of a visible minority or an indigenous identity.)	67,350	86.19%	68,845	89.86%	68,080	92.36%
Indigenous	5,415	6.93%	4,370	5.7%	3,440	4.67%
Southeast Asian (Note: Statistic includes total responses of "Filipino" and "Southeast Asian" under visible minority section on census.)	2,110	2.7%	1,200	1.57%	725	0.98%
East Asian (Note: Statistic includes total responses of "Chinese", "Korean", and "Japanese" under visible minority section on census.)	985	1.26%	670	0.87%	585	0.79%
South Asian	970	1.24%	540	0.7%	215	0.29%
African	875	1.12%	610	0.8%	430	0.58%
Latin American	200	0.26%	120	0.16%	150	0.2%
Middle Eastern (Note: Statistic includes total responses of "West Asian" and "Arab" under visible minority section on census.)	95	0.12%	75	0.1%	10	0.01%
Other/multiracial (Note: Statistic includes total responses of "Visible minority, n.i.e." and "Multiple visible minorities" under visible minority section on census.)	150	0.19%	185	0.24%	70	0.09%
Total responses	78,145	97.02%	76,615	96.09%	73,715	96.86%
Total population	80,547	100%	79,733	100%	76,106	100%
Notes: Totals greater than 100% due to multiple origin responses. Demographics based on 2012 Canadian federal electoral redistribution riding boundaries.

== Members of Parliament ==
The riding has been represented by Fraser Tolmie of the Conservative Party since 2021. It has elected the following members of Parliament:

Parliament	Years	Member	Party
Moose Jaw—Lake Centre—Lanigan; Riding created from Blackstrap, Palliser, Regina—Lumsden—Lake Centre, Saskatoon—Humboldt, Souris—Moose Mountain, and Wascana
42nd	2015–2019	Tom Lukiwski	Conservative
43rd	2019–2021	Tom Lukiwski	Conservative
44th	2021–2025	Fraser Tolmie	Conservative
45th	2025–present	Fraser Tolmie	Conservative

== Election results ==
View source data.
Graph of election results in Moose Jaw—Lake Centre—Lanigan (minor parties that never got 2% of the vote or didn't run consistently are omitted)

=== 2023 representation order ===
2025 Canadian federal election
** Preliminary results — Not yet official **
Party	Candidate	Votes	%	±%	Expenditures
New Democratic	Britt Baumann				
People's	Chey Craik				
Green	Mike Gardiner				
Liberal	Tabitha Mukamusoni				
Conservative	Fraser Tolmie				
Total valid votes/expense limit					
Total rejected ballots					
Turnout					
Eligible voters					
Source: Elections Canada

2021 federal election redistributed results
Party	Vote	%
Conservative	25,975	60.99
New Democratic	8,060	18.93
People's	4,820	11.32
Liberal	2,569	6.03
Green	439	1.03
Others	726	1.70

=== 2013 representation order ===
2021 Canadian federal election
Party	Candidate	Votes	%	±%	Expenditures
Conservative	Fraser Tolmie	24,869	60.4	-10.7	$64,739.58
New Democratic	Talon Regent	7,975	19.4	+2.4	$17,715.39
People's	Chey Craik	4,712	11.4	+7.8	$29,568.05
Liberal	Katelyn Zimmer	2,526	6.1	+0.5	$7,798.44
Maverick	D. Craig Townsend	664	1.6	-	$2,514.26
Green	Isaiah Hunter	438	1.1	–1.5	$0.00
Total valid votes/expense limit		41,184	99.96	+0.6	$117,516.56
Total rejected ballots		206	0.04	-0.6	
Turnout		41,184	69.32	-6.52	
Eligible voters		59,414			
Conservative hold		Swing		-6.55%	
Source: Elections Canada

2019 Canadian federal election
Party	Candidate	Votes	%	±%	Expenditures
Conservative	Tom Lukiwski	31,993	71.12	+15.66	$84,868.64
New Democratic	Talon Regent	7,660	17.03	-6.75	$20,047.18
Liberal	Cecilia Melanson	2,517	5.60	-12.38	$9,502.06
People's	Chey Craik	1,613	3.59	-	$6,772.92
Green	Gillian Walker	1,201	2.67	+0.38	$40.00
Total valid votes/expense limit		44,984	99.36		
Total rejected ballots		291	0.64	+0.31	
Turnout		45,275	75.84	+3.66	
Eligible voters		59,700			
Conservative hold		Swing		+11.21	
Source: Elections Canada

2015 Canadian federal election
Party	Candidate	Votes	%	±%	Expenditures
Conservative	Tom Lukiwski	23,273	55.46	-5.5	$92,066.05
New Democratic	Dustan Hlady	9,978	23.78	-8.74	$51,621.27
Liberal	Perry Juttla	7,545	17.98	+14.2	$9,767.66
Green	Shawn Setyo	961	2.29	-0.42	$526.74
Rhinoceros	Robert Thomas	208	0.50	–	$99.08
Total valid votes/expense limit		41,965	99.66		$223,430.81
Total rejected ballots		142	0.34	–	
Turnout		42,107	72.18	–	
Eligible voters		58,335			
Conservative hold		Swing		-7.09	
Source: Elections Canada

2011 federal election redistributed results
Party	Vote	%
Conservative	22,963	60.96
New Democratic	12,252	32.52
Liberal	1,423	3.78
Green	1,021	2.71
Independent	11	0.03

== See also ==
- List of Canadian electoral districts
- Historical federal electoral districts of Canada
