= Tom Lukiwski =

Canadian politician (born 1951)

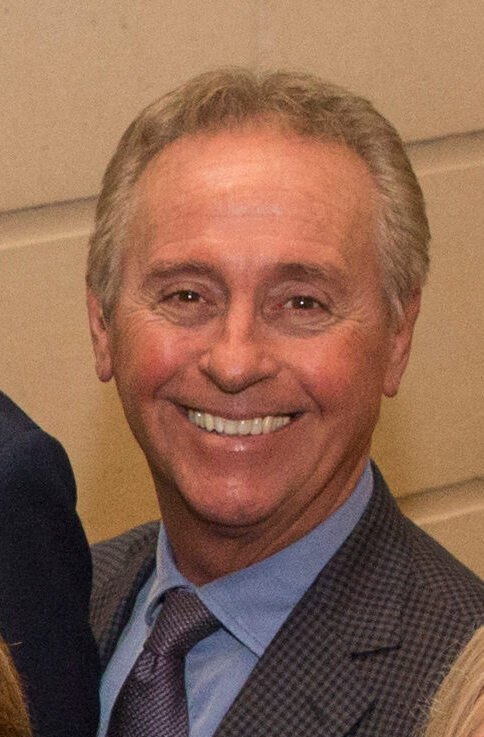

Member of Parliament for Moose Jaw—Lake Centre—Lanigan Regina—Lumsden—Lake Centre (2004-2015)
- In office June 28, 2004 – September 20, 2021
- Preceded by: Larry Spencer
- Succeeded by: Fraser Tolmie

Chairman of the Standing Committee on Government Operations and Estimates
- In office February 16, 2016 – August 18, 2020
- Preceded by: Pat Martin
- Succeeded by: Robert Kitchen

Personal details
- Born: October 5, 1951 (age 74) Esterhazy, Saskatchewan
- Party: Conservative
- Spouse: Diane Lukiwiski
- Profession: small business owner, political administrator

Tom Lukiwski (born October 5, 1951) is a former Canadian politician who served as a member of Parliament (MP) from 2004 to 2021 as a member of the Conservative Party. He represented the Saskatchewan riding of Regina—Lumsden—Lake Centre from 2004 to 2015 and, following the 2012 federal electoral district redistribution, he represented Moose Jaw—Lake Centre—Lanigan from 2015 to 2021. He did not run for re-election in the 2021 federal election.

== Background ==
Lukiwski was born in Esterhazy, Saskatchewan. Prior to entering politics, he was a businessman and political administrator.

== Political career ==
Lukiwski was first elected in 2004, winning by 122 votes over Liberal Gary J. Anderson. His predecessor, Larry Spencer, was denied the opportunity to run as a Conservative, despite having served as a member of the Canadian Alliance, due to inflammatory comments he made regarding homosexuality. At the time, Lukiwski criticized Spencer for making the remarks and approved of revoking Spencer's party membership.

Lukiwski was re-elected in the 2006, 2008, and 2011 general elections. He served as the Parliamentary Secretary to the Leader of the Government in the House of Commons, the Hon. Peter Van Loan.

=== Filibustering ===
Lukiwski is well known on Parliament Hill for his ability to stall Parliamentary Committee business by "filibustering". An example of this ability includes speaking for almost 120 minutes to prevent the Canadian House of Commons Standing Committee on Environment and Sustainable Development from studying a private member's bill to implement the Kyoto Accord on October 26, 2006. Lukiwski admitted later that he deliberately stalled the proceedings. Further examples include the February 5, 2008, and February 7, 2008 Canadian House of Commons Standing Committee on Procedure and House Affairs meetings, in which Lukiwski blocked any inquiry into allegations that the Conservative Party spent over the maximum allowable campaign limits during the 2006 election.

=== Equalization ===
As an Opposition MP, Lukiwski argued that non-renewable natural resource revenues, such as revenues from oil and gas, should be excluded from the calculations of the equalization formula. Despite acknowledging that Saskatchewan was no longer a "have-not" province, Lukiwski estimated that Saskatchewan would be between $800 million to $1.5 billion wealthier each year if non-renewable resources were removed from the equalization formula.

On March 22, 2005, Lukiwski introduced a motion into the House of Commons calling for changes to the equalization formula. During his speech introducing the motion, Lukiwski stated that "[w]hat we are asking today in this motion is that the non-renewable natural resources should be removed from the equalization formula."

Lukiwski, along with the Conservatives, promised during the 2006 federal election that a Conservative government would remove non-renewable natural resource revenue from the equalization formula. On January 19, 2006, only days before the 2006 election, Lukiwski stated that Saskatchewan would be "$2 to 2.5 billion wealthier each and every year" as a result of the changes.

However, once elected, the Conservatives began to indicate that any future equalization program changes would not necessarily be what was promised.

In the federal budget introduced on March 19, 2007, the Conservatives introduced changes to the equalization system which imposed caps on payments. This resulted in Saskatchewan not being able to retain 100% of its non-renewable resource revenue. Lukiwski acknowledged that the Conservative changes did not exactly fulfill the Conservative's promise with the changes, stating "If you want to say we didn't fulfil the commitment or keep our promise, fair enough."

The 2007 federal budget passed with the support of the Bloc Québécois.

=== Videotape controversy ===
On April 3, 2008, the New Democratic Party of Saskatchewan released a videotape showing Lukiwski, then 40 years old, making homophobic remarks in 1991. At the time the videotape was made, Lukiwski was the general manager of the Progressive Conservative Party of Saskatchewan led by Grant Devine. In the video, he says:

"There's A's and there's B's. The A's are guys like me, the B's are homosexual faggots with dirt under their fingernails that transmit diseases."

The release of the tape provoked immediate controversy, including calls for Lukiwski's resignation or removal as a Parliamentary Secretary.

Lukiwski apologized for the comments, saying "If I could take those comments back I would... They do not reflect the type of person that I am."

Lukiwski subsequently promised that "I can assure you, Mr. Speaker, and all of my colleagues in this House that I will spend the rest of my career and my life trying to make up for those shameful comments."

However, he failed to attend a May 31, 2008, Regina gay pride parade to which he was invited. Gay groups said they were disappointed that Lukiwski failed to respond at all to the invitation. "Mr. Lukiwski stated in his public apology... that he would spend the rest of his life making amends," said gay pride spokesman Nathan Markwart. "Well, when exactly does that kick in? It is clear that his apology is less than sincere and is, in fact, hollow as it has not been followed up with any concerted effort to join our celebrations as an elected official who represents gays and lesbians in Regina and surrounding area." Markwart noted that the disappointment was heightened by their understanding that Lukiwski was in the Regina area on the date of the parade.

=== Videotape controversy 2 ===
During his victory speech on October 19, 2015, Mickey Djuric, then with the Moose Jaw Times-Herald, asserted that Lukiwski called the NDP candidate in the upcoming Saskatchewan elections a "whore". Lukiwski denied the claim, insisting that he referred to "an NDP horde" in his speech. The Times-Herald eventually decided not to run the story, causing Djuric to resign her position in protest, while interim Conservative leader Rona Ambrose stated she was satisfied with Lukiwski's explanation.

=== Other apologies ===
In 2005, Lukiwski was sued for libel by former Liberal MP Reg Alcock for wrongly claiming Alcock had given his campaign manager a job with the Canadian Wheat Board. Lukiwski stated that the matter was settled out of court in 2007 in Alcock's favour, with Lukiwski apologizing to Alcock in a statement.

In November 2009, Lukiwski apologized in the House of Commons for mailing out Parliamentary flyers to the riding of Liberal MP Larry Bagnell which wrongly stated how Bagnell had voted on a private member's bill on the long-gun registry.

== Electoral record ==
2019 Canadian federal election: Moose Jaw—Lake Centre—Lanigan
Party	Candidate	Votes	%	±%	Expenditures
Conservative	Tom Lukiwski	31,993	71.12	+15.66	$84,868.64
New Democratic	Talon Regent	7,660	17.03	-6.75	$20,047.18
Liberal	Cecilia Melanson	2,517	5.60	-12.38	$9,502.06
People's	Chey Craik	1,613	3.59	-	$6,772.92
Green	Gillian Walker	1,201	2.67	+0.38	$40.00
Total valid votes/expense limit		44,984	99.36		
Total rejected ballots		291	0.64	+0.31	
Turnout		45,275	75.84	+3.66	
Eligible voters		59,700			
Conservative hold		Swing		+11.21	
Source: Elections Canada

2015 Canadian federal election: Moose Jaw—Lake Centre—Lanigan
Party	Candidate	Votes	%	±%	Expenditures
Conservative	Tom Lukiwski	23,273	55.46	-5.5	$92,066.05
New Democratic	Dustan Hlady	9,978	23.78	-8.74	$51,621.27
Liberal	Perry Juttla	7,545	17.98	+14.2	$9,767.66
Green	Shawn Setyo	961	2.29	-0.42	$526.74
Rhinoceros	Robert Thomas	208	0.50	–	$99.08
Total valid votes/expense limit		41,965	99.66		$223,430.81
Total rejected ballots		142	0.34	–	
Turnout		42,107	72.18	–	
Eligible voters		58,335			
Conservative hold		Swing		-7.09	
Source: Elections Canada

2011 Canadian federal election: Regina—Lumsden—Lake Centre
Party	Candidate	Votes	%	±%	Expenditures
Conservative	Tom Lukiwski	18,076	53.2	+2.1	$76,585
New Democratic	Brian Sklar	12,518	36.2	+7.7	$21,302
Liberal	Monica Lysack	2,467	7.3	-7.6	$44,964
Green	Billy Patterson	911	2.7	-2.8	$195
Total valid votes/Expense limit		33,972	100.0		$83,129
Total rejected ballots		89	0.3	0.0	
Turnout		34,061	67.6	+5	
Eligible voters		50,387	–	–	

2008 Canadian federal election: Regina—Lumsden—Lake Centre
Party	Candidate	Votes	%	±%	Expenditures
Conservative	Tom Lukiwski	16,053	51.1	+8.9	$68,988
New Democratic	Fred Kress	8,963	28.5	-0.4	$16,804
Liberal	Monica Lysack	4,668	14.9	-11.3	$47,936
Green	Nicolas Stulberg	1,737	5.5	+3.2	$3,513
Total valid votes/Expense limit		31,421	100.0		$80,038
Total rejected ballots		83	0.3	+0.1	
Turnout		31,504	63	-5	

2006 Canadian federal election: Regina—Lumsden—Lake Centre
Party	Candidate	Votes	%	±%	Expenditures
Conservative	Tom Lukiwski	14,176	42.1	+8.9	$60,131
New Democratic	Moe Kovatch	9,467	28.1	+1.3	$47,556
Liberal	Gary J. Anderson	8,956	26.6	-6.2	$73,596
Green	William Sorochan	1,035	3.1	+0.8	$730
Total valid votes		33,634	100.0		–
Total rejected ballots		73	0.2	-0.1	
Turnout		33,707	68	+5	

2004 Canadian federal election: Regina—Lumsden—Lake Centre
Party	Candidate	Votes	%	±%	Expenditures
Conservative	Tom Lukiwski	10,290	33.2	-9.7	$57,639
Liberal	Gary J. Anderson	10,167	32.8	+18.8	$53,396
New Democratic	Moe Kovatch	8,300	26.8	-15.6	$60,642
Independent	Larry Spencer	1,506	4.9	–	$21,488
Green	Fiorindo Agi	716	2.3	–	
Total valid votes		30,978	100.0		–
Total rejected ballots		79	0.3	-0.1	
Turnout		31,057	63	0	
