= Seager Wheeler =

- Born: 1868; Isle of Wight, England
- Died: December 15, 1961; Victoria
- Occupation(s): Plant breeder, agronomist, farmer
- Known for: pioneering viable wheat strains suitable for the Canadian prairies
- Spouse: Lily Martin in 1908
- Children: Beth and Isobelle

Seager Wheeler, MBE (1868 – December 15, 1961) was a Canadian agronomist. Wheeler produced viable economic wheat and fruit strains for a short prairie growing season with harsh winters. Known as the "Wheat King of the prairies" or "The Wheat Wizard of Rosthern" he owned and operated the Seager Wheeler's Maple Grove Farm. He was designated as a person of national historic significance in 1988 by the Canadian federal government and inducted into the Saskatchewan Agricultural Hall of Fame.

Seager came to Canada in 1885 and applied for his own homestead in 1890. His original homestead was located at NE Section 16 Township 38 Range 4 West of the 3rd Meridian, and he was aided by a loan from the Temperance Colonization Society Limited - Toronto Whereas the nearest present day town of Rosthern, Saskatchewan is located at Sec.35, Twp.42, R.3, W3. To get to the restored Seager Wheeler Maple Grove 185-acre (0.75 km^{2}) Farm travel 7 km east of Rosthern. Five separate entries of wheat which were grown at this farm location during 1911 to 1918 won World Wheat Championships. Morris Bodnar, Member of Parliament for Saskatoon—Dundurn, commemorated Seager Wheeler's Maple Grove Farm as a National Historic Site of Canada on August 3, 1996. The site is honoured as the location where hardy wheat and fruit strains were developed which were well suited to the prairie climate and growing season.

== Life ==
Born on the Isle of Wight, England in 1868, Wheeler emigrated to the Canadian prairies in 1885, the year of the North-West Rebellion. He worked on various farms for five years before applying for his own homestead near Rosthern, Saskatchewan. He died in Victoria and is interred with his family in the Bergthal cemetery, near Rosthern, where he homesteaded. He co-authored a book with Herbert Joseph (Hopkins) Moorhouse called “Seager Wheeler's Profitable Grain Growing”. His life story by Jim Shilliday was published in 2007 by the Canadian Plains Research Center.

== History ==
Seager Wheeler developed many dryland farming techniques, invented equipment as well as winning numerous awards for developing wheat strains and fruits which would grow in the short prairie season, seeds which would survive over winter and many other practices which helped develop a sustainable agricultural economy in Saskatchewan.

== Awards ==
- 1911 New York Land Show International Award for Wheat entry.
- 1911 Canadian Pacific Railway first prize of $1000 in gold coins for best North American hard spring wheat.
- 1915 Denver Competition Prize.
- 1916 El Paso Competition Prize.
- 1918 International Soil Products Exposition in Kansas City Prize.
- 1919 honorary Doctor of Laws degree by Queen's University
- 1945 Member of the Order of the British Empire
- 1972 Saskatchewan Agricultural Hall of Fame
- 1988 designated by the Canadian Government as a person of National Significance.

== Legacy ==
- Seager Wheeler Hall at the residences of University of Saskatchewan is named in his honour.
- Seager Wheeler Lake Area named in his honour.
- Dr. Seager Wheeler Park, located in Saskatoon's Westview neighborhood is named in his honour.

== Published works ==
- Grain Growers' Guide – articles
- Seager Wheeler's book on profitable grain growing / by Seager Wheeler. With biographical sketch by Herbert Joseph (Hopkins) Moorhouse. Publisher: Winnipeg : The Grain growers' guide, 1919.
- Seager Wheeler's book on profitable grain growing Publisher: Winnipeg, Grain Growers' Guide, ltd, 1919.
- Special prices on Seager Wheeler's selected seeds and northern grown nursery stockPublisher: [Rosthern? Sask. : S. Wheeler], 1930.
- Seager Wheeler's book on profitable grain growing 2nd ed. / by Seager Wheeler; with biographical sketch by Herbert Joseph (Hopkins) Moorhouse. Publisher Winnipeg : Grain Growers' Guide, 1919.
- Special prices on Seager Wheeler's 1927 selected seeds Publisher: [Rosthern? Sask. : S. Wheeler, 1926?]
- Profitable Grain Growing published by Grain Growers Guide in 1919 by Herbert Joseph Moorhouse and Seager Wheeler.
