= Seager Wheeler's Maple Grove Farm =

Coordinates: 52°40′25″N 106°13′5″W

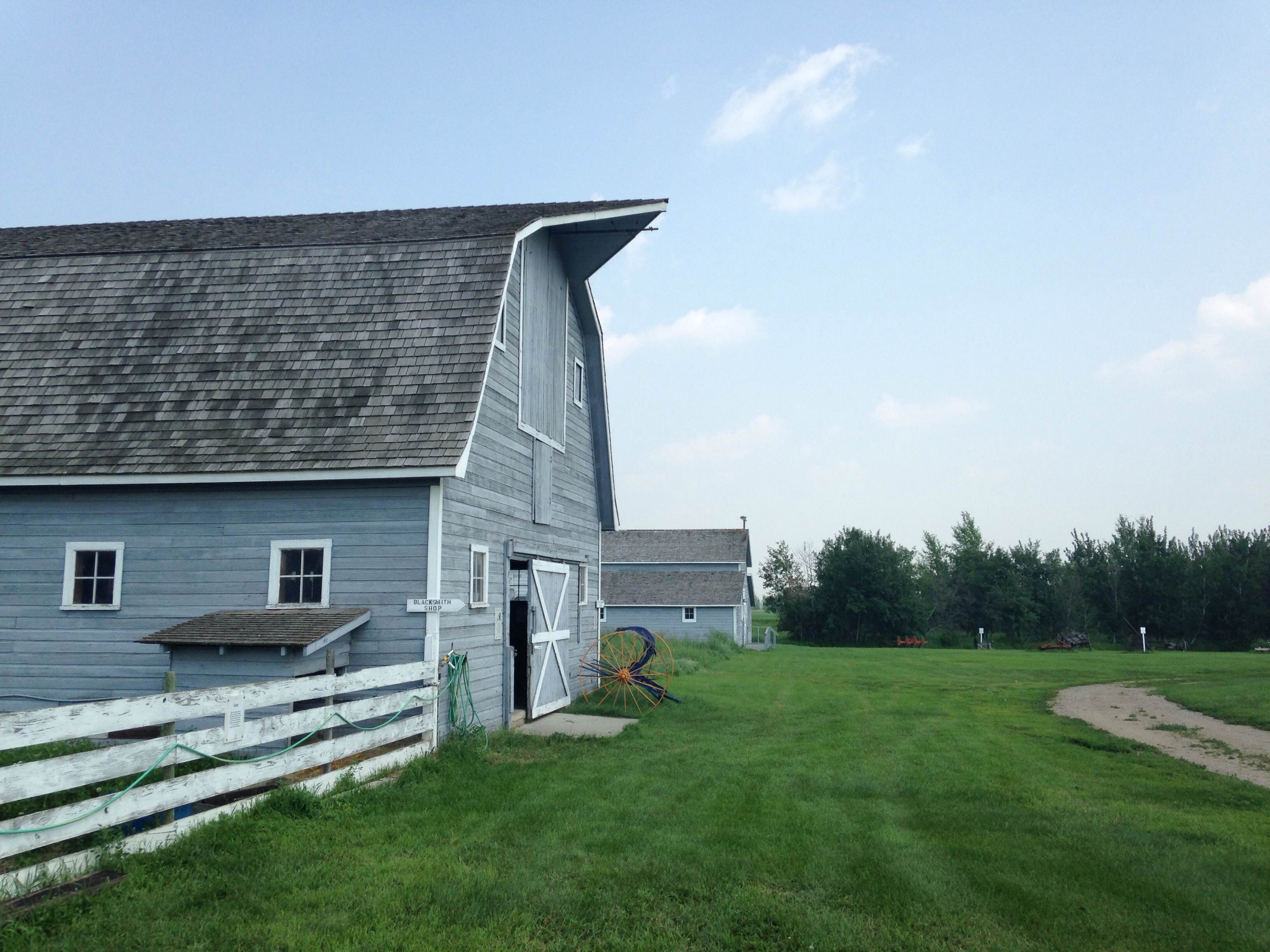
- Barn and seed cleaning plant
- Interactive map of Seager Wheeler's Maple Grove Farm
- Location: Rosthern No. 403, Saskatchewan, Canada
- Founded: 1898
- Built: 1898 to 1928
- Website: www.seagerwheelerfarm.org

National Historic Site of Canada
- Designated: 1994

Seager Wheeler's Maple Grove Farm is a National Historic Site of Canada. Seager Wheeler's Maple Grove Farm was a farm owned and operated by agronomist Seager Wheeler (1868–1961) "Wheat King of the Prairies" or "The Wheat Wizard of Rosthern" who developed dry land farming techniques as well as fruit and wheat strains which could grow in a short prairie growing season followed by harsh winters. Seager came to Canada in 1885 and applied for his own homestead in 1890. His original homestead was located at NE Section 16 Township 38 Range 4 West of the 3rd Meridian, and he was aided by a loan from the Temperance Colonization Society Limited - Toronto Whereas the nearest present day town of Rosthern, Saskatchewan is located at Sec.35, Twp.42, R.3, W3. To get to the restored Seager Wheeler Maple Grove 185-acre (0.75 km^{2}) Farm travel 7 km east of Rosthern. Five separate entries of wheat which were grown at this farm location during 1911 to 1918 won World Wheat Championships. Morris Bodnar, Member of Parliament for Saskatoon—Dundurn, commemorated Seager Wheeler's Maple Grove Farm as a National Historic Site of Canada on August 3, 1996 The site is honoured as the location where hardy wheat and fruit strains were developed which were well suited to the prairie climate and growing season.

== History ==
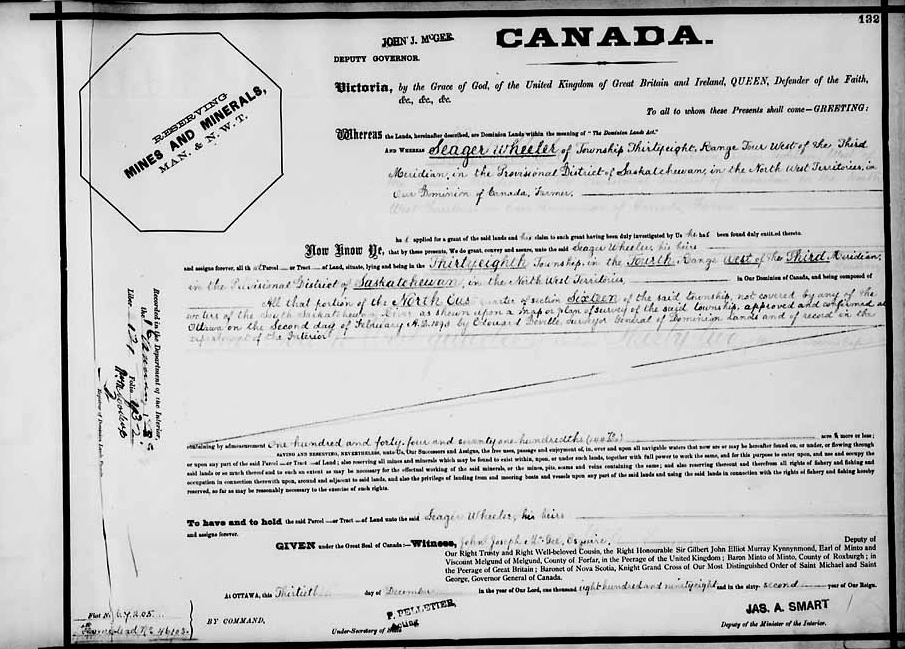
Seager Wheeler Land Patent Form

Seager Wheeler developed many dryland farming techniques, invented equipment as well as winning numerous awards for developing wheat strains and fruits which would grow in the short prairie season, seeds which would survive over winter and many other practises which helped develop a sustainable agricultural economy in Saskatchewan.

Seager Wheeler's brother, Percy Wheeler, also homesteaded in the area successfully proving his land at SW section 2 Township 43 (A) Range 2 W of the 3rd Meridian in 1884. Seager and Percy jointly developed the three point seed cleaning system which present day farmers still use.

The Seager Wheeler Historic Farm Society purchased the farm and opened it up in 1996. The farming techniques, implements, and pursuit of prairie wheats and fruits by Seager Wheeler, are presented on the restored homestead by the Seager Wheeler Historic Farm Society. Sheila Copps, Deputy Prime Minister and Minister of Canadian Heritage, presented the 1996 Parks Canada Award to the Seager Wheeler Historic Farm Society.

== Writings ==
"Profitable Grain Growing" published by Grain Growers' Guide in 1919 by Seager Wheeler.

== Nearby ==
- Batoche National Historic Site
- Valley - Rosthern Regional Park
- Wheat Stalks (Statue) Rosthern Roadside Attraction
