= Lynne Yelich =

Canadian politician (born 1953)

The Honourable Lynne Yelich PC
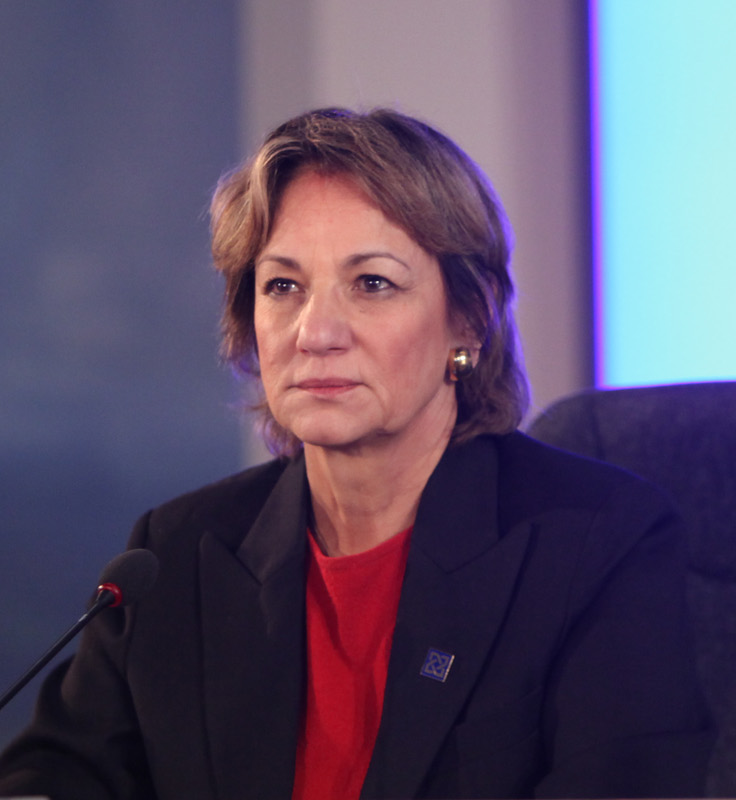
- Yelich at the NATO Foreign Affairs ministers meeting with International Organisations, September 2014

Member of Parliament for Blackstrap
- In office November 27, 2000 – October 19, 2015
- Preceded by: Allan Kerpan
- Succeeded by: riding abolished

Minister of State (Foreign Affairs and Consular)
- In office July 15, 2013 – November 4, 2015
- Prime Minister: Stephen Harper
- Preceded by: Diane Ablonczy

Minister of State (Western Economic Diversification)
- In office October 30, 2008 – July 15, 2013
- Prime Minister: Stephen Harper
- Preceded by: Rona Ambrose
- Succeeded by: Michelle Rempel

Personal details
- Born: Lynne Zdunich; March 24, 1953 (age 73) Saskatoon, Saskatchewan, Canada
- Party: Conservative
- Spouse: Matt Yelich
- Profession: Farmer, banker

Lynne Yelich, PC (née Zdunich; born March 24, 1953) is a Canadian politician and was the Conservative MP for the former riding of Blackstrap and predecessor riding components, from 2000 to 2015.

== Life and career ==
Yelich was born in Saskatoon, Saskatchewan. She is a third-generation Croatian Canadian. The riding of Blackstrap included Yelich's home town of Kenaston, Saskatchewan, identified as the largest Croatian farming settlement in Canada. Yelich was first elected to the House of Commons of Canada in 2000 and was re-elected in 2004, 2006, 2008 and 2011.

At the time of the 2005 dissolution of the 38th Parliament, Lynne Yelich was cited by Carol Goar as one of six Members of Parliament who had "tried to use the legislative system to improve the lives of Canadians" and who deserved "credit for attempting to play a positive role in a House consumed by partisan machinations".

Subsequent to the election of the Conservative minority government in 2006, Yelich was appointed by Prime Minister Stephen Harper as the Parliamentary Secretary to the Minister of Human Resources and Social Development. She was appointed Minister of State (Western Economic Diversification) by Harper following the re-election of the Conservative minority government in 2008. Yelich was last appointed Minister of State (Foreign Affairs and Consular) in July 2013.

During her Parliamentary tenure, Yelich served on the Citizenship & Immigration, Transport, Government Operations & Estimates, and Status of Women committees. She was also a member of the Standing Committee on Human Resources and Social Development and the Status of Persons with Disabilities (HUMA). She also served as Critic for Women Entrepreneurs, Families and Caregivers, Status of Women, Cities, and Grain Transportation.

Yelich introduced private member's motions to make sexually explicit material contraband in prisons, keep open local weather stations, establish a report on decorum in the House, and support research on endometriosis.

In 2015, Yelich lost the Conservative party nomination for the newly created riding of Saskatoon—Grasswood, essentially the Saskatoon portion of her old riding, to local sports broadcaster Kevin Waugh.
