= Nutana Urban Centre, Saskatoon =

Nutana Urban Centre
- Neighborhood
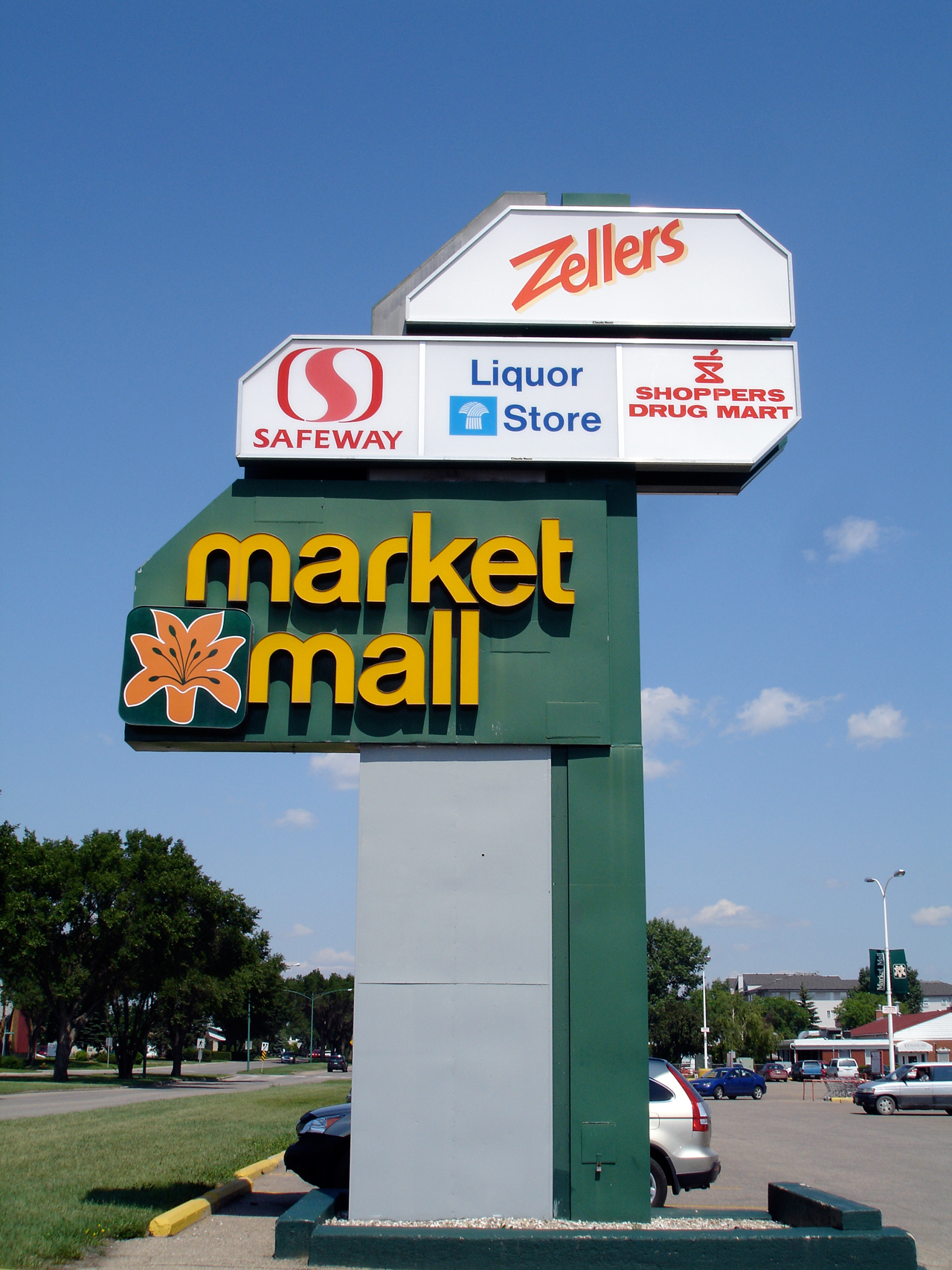
- Market Mall sign

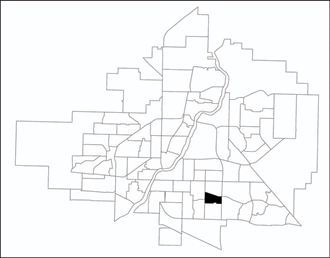
- Nutana Urban Centre location map
- Coordinates: 52°6′13″N 106°39′20″W
- Country: Canada
- Province: Saskatchewan
- City: Saskatoon
- Sector: Nutana
- Annexed: 1910-1919
- Construction: 1961-present

Government
  - Type: Municipal (Ward 9)
  - Administrative body: Saskatoon City Council
  - Councillor: Bev Dubois
  - Member of Legislature: Matt Love (Saskatoon Eastview)
  - Member of Legislature: Keith Jorgenson (Saskatoon Churchill-Wildwood)
  - Member of Parliament: Kevin Waugh

Area
  - Total: 0.78 km^{2} (0.30 sq mi)

Population (2024)
  - Total: 3,008
  - Average Income: $34,474
- Time zone: UTC-6 (UTC)

Nutana Urban Centre, previously known as Nutana Suburban Centre, is a mixed-development neighbourhood located in south-central Saskatoon, Saskatchewan, Canada. It is a classified as a "suburban centre" subdivision, composed of medium to high-density multiple-unit dwellings, commercial areas and civic facilities. As of 2009, the area is home to 2,962 residents. Housing in the neighbourhood consists of high-density apartment-style dwellings and row houses. The neighbourhood is considered a lower-income area, with an average family income of $34,474, an average dwelling value of $266,311 and a home ownership rate of 29.3%. The low average income but comparatively high dwelling value is due to the number of senior citizens residing in the neighbourhood. The age distribution of Nutana Urban Centre's population is skewed very highly toward residents age 65 and older.

== History ==
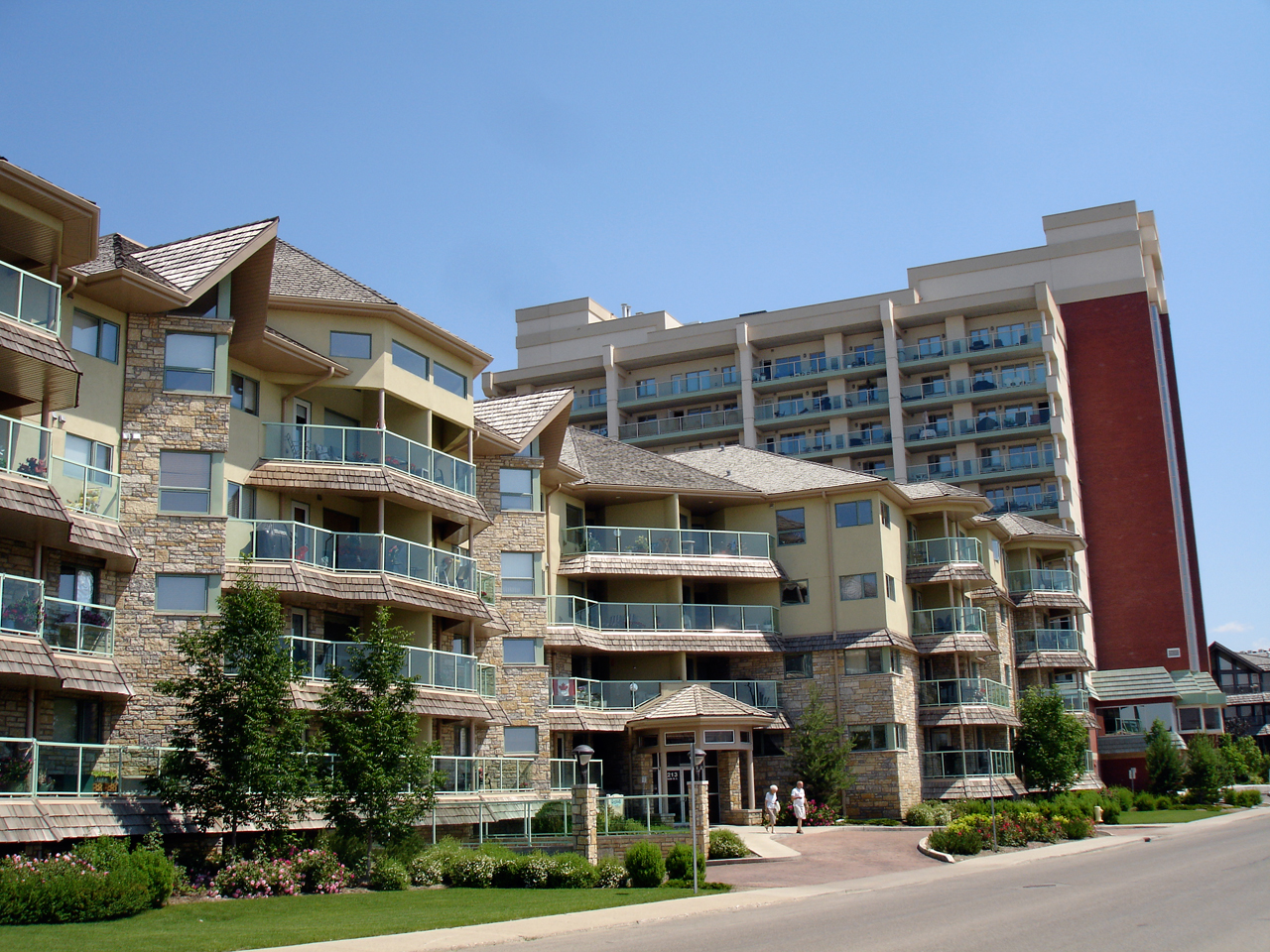
Nutana Urban Centre residences

A 1913 map shows that the present-day Nutana Urban Centre was a registered subdivision named Utopia. The land however, was not annexed until the period between 1955 and 1959. Development did not begin in earnest until the 1960s, when adjacent neighbourhoods like Brevoort Park and Eastview emerged. Home construction was most active between 1961 and 1980, but has continued at a steady pace to the present day due to a number of older buildings being replaced by new tower developments.

Nutana Suburban Centre was unique in that it was the first post-World War II neighbourhood to combine high-density housing with schools, businesses and civic facilities. This "suburban centre" concept would be repeated in later years with the development of the Lawson Heights, Confederation, Lakewood, University Heights and Blairmore suburban centres, several of which were developed as part of other neighbourhoods and retroactively delineated as suburban centres when the City of Saskatoon revised its community boundaries in the 1990s. The suburban centres were rebranded as urban centres in the 2010s.

Walter Murray Collegiate Institute, a public secondary school, opened in 1962. Holy Cross High School followed shortly after in 1963. Market Mall opened in 1966 as Saskatoon's first enclosed shopping mall.

In 1966 a hospital was planned for Taylor Street east of Arlington Avenue, but it was ultimately never built. In addition, the 1965 official street map for Saskatoon indicates another location for an unidentified high school east of the intersection of Louise Street and Arlington Avenue that was never constructed (instead, Louise was extended to the east and part of the property became the headquarters of the Saskatchewan Teachers Federation).

== Government and politics ==
Nutana Urban Centre exists within the federal electoral district of Saskatoon—Grasswood. It is currently represented by Kevin Waugh of the Conservative Party of Canada, first elected in 2015.

Provincially, the area is divided by Arlington Avenue into the constituencies of Saskatoon Churchill-Wildwood and Saskatoon Eastview. Saskatoon Churchill-Wildwood is currently represented by Lisa Lambert of the Saskatchewan Party since 2016. Saskatoon Eastview is currently represented by Matt Love of the New Democratic Party since 2020.

In Saskatoon's non-partisan municipal politics, Nutana Urban Centre lies within ward 9. It is currently represented by Councillor Bev Dubois since 2016.

== Institutions ==
=== Education ===
Nutana Urban Centre has two major high schools that serve students from across the eastern half of Saskatoon.

- Walter Murray Collegiate - public secondary, part of the Saskatoon Public School Division
- Holy Cross High School - separate (Catholic) secondary, part of the Greater Saskatoon Catholic School Board

== Parks and recreation ==
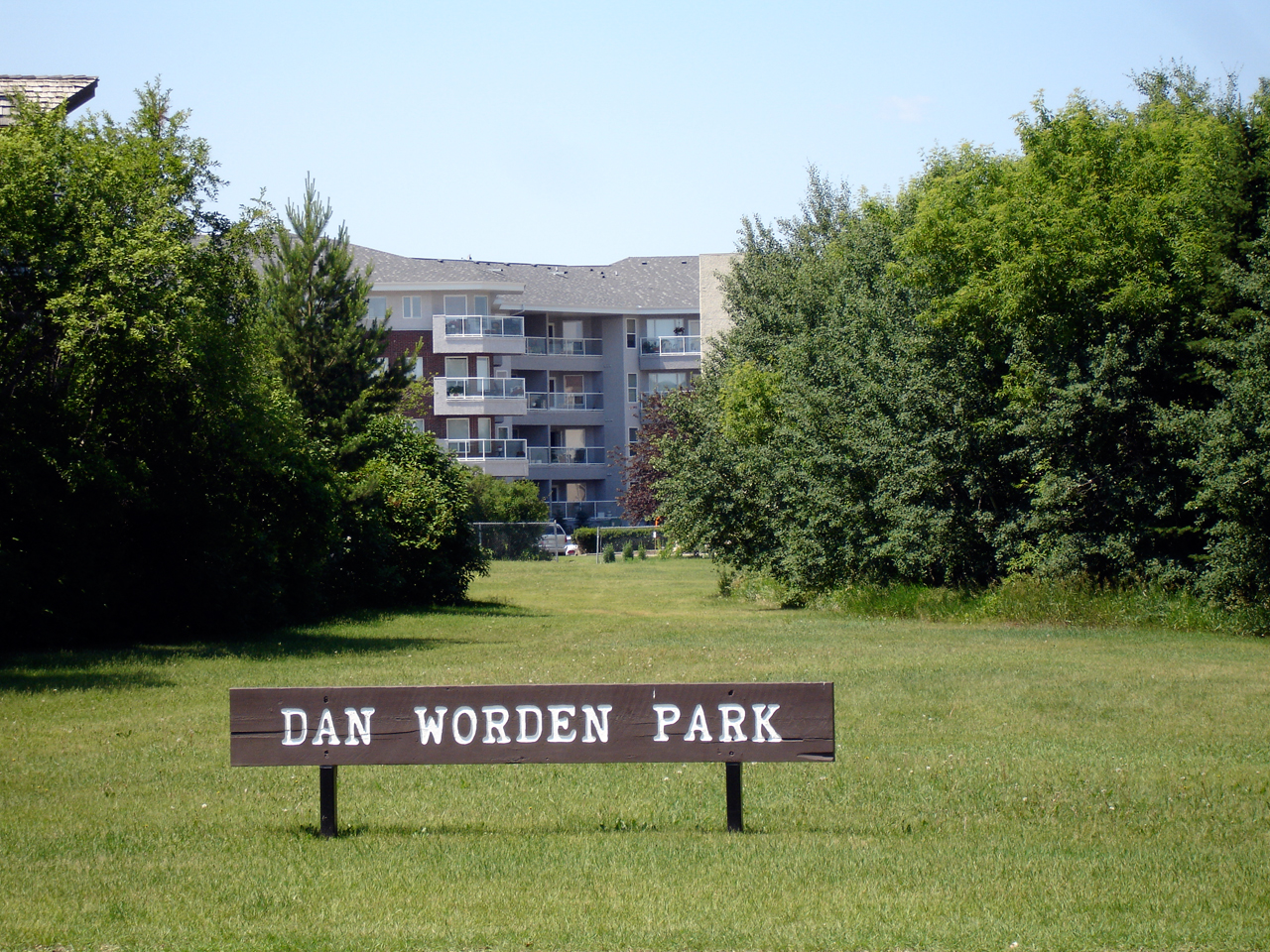
Dan Worden Park

- Dan Worden Park - 2.3 acres (0.93 ha)
- Nutana Kiwanis (North) Park - 4.0 acres (1.6 ha)
- Nutana Kiwanis Park - 27.3 acres (11.0 ha)

Nutana Urban Centre does not have its own community association, but is represented by the one from the adjacent Eastview neighbourhood. The city's branch of the Royal Canadian Legion is also located in the Nutana Urban Centre, off Louise Street. Other recreation facilities in the community include a curling rink and a bowling alley.

== Public services ==
Nutana Urban Centre is a part of the east division of the Saskatoon Police Service's patrol system. Saskatoon Fire & Protective Services' east division covers the neighbourhood. Transit services to Nutana Urban Centre are provided by Saskatoon Transit on routes No. 1 (Wildwood - Westview), 6 (University - Market Mall), 12 (River Heights - Market Mall), and 16 (University - Market Mall). Market Mall is a major transit hub on Saskatoon's east side.

== Commercial ==
Nutana Urban Centre's primary commercial hub is Market Mall, which opened in 1966 as Saskatoon's first enclosed shopping mall and has undergone numerous expansions over the years; as of 2014 it has only one anchor tenant, Canada Safeway, following the closure of its Zellers location. In 2018 the anchor bay formerly occupied by Zellers and vacant since 2012 was redeveloped into several smaller retailers, including new anchors Giant Tiger and Planet Fitness and a relocated Fabricland outlet. A new entrance to the mall was added with the Giant Tiger renovation. In July 2019, Sobeys announced that the Safeway at Market Mall and three other locations in Saskatoon would be closed and converted to its discount brand FreshCo in 2020.

Additional businesses, primarily of the service variety, but also including a bowling alley, are on the east end of Louise Street. In addition, there are 3 home-based businesses in the neighbourhood.

== Location ==
Nutana Urban Centre is located within the Nutana Sector. It is bounded by Taylor Street to the north, Louise Street to the south, Preston Avenue to the west, and Circle Drive to the east. The few roads that exist inside these boundaries are a mix of local and collector roads.
