= Nutana (disambiguation) =

Nutana is a neighbourhood in the center of the city of Saskatoon, Saskatchewan, Canada.

Nutana may also refer to:

- Nutana Park, Saskatoon, a residential neighbourhood in south-central Saskatoon
- Nutana Suburban Centre, Saskatoon, a mixed-use neighbourhood in southeast Saskatoon
- Nutana Sector, a sector (planning district) on the east side of Saskatoon
- Saskatoon Nutana, a provincial electoral district in Saskatchewan
