= Jeanne Thomarat =

Jeanne Aline Thomarat (1893 – 1985) was a French-born Canadian outsider artist who lived and worked in Saskatchewan. She is known for her landscape paintings.

== Life ==
Jeanne Aline Thomarat was born in Lyon in 1893 and came to Canada in 1905, when she was twelve. She lived near Hafford, Saskatchewan. She returned briefly to France in 1921 where she married Armand Thomarat, a handyman. The couple settled at Duck Lake. She later moved to Rosthern, where she died in 1985.

== Work ==
Thomarat began painting in 1952, when she was 59 years old. She painted peaceful landscapes that she remembered from France using oils. She was self-taught and did not desire any formal art training; she considered herself a "primitive" artist.

== Collections and exhibits ==
Thomarat's work is included in public and private collections, including the National Gallery of Canada, the University of Calgary, the Arts Development Branch of Alberta Community Development and the Saskatchewan Arts Board.

== Recognition ==
Thomarat's work was included in the first major exhibit of Saskatchewan folk art, Grassroots Saskatchewan, curated by David Thauberger in 1976. She was featured in a CBC television documentary on folk art in 1979.
