= Ron Fisher (politician) =

Canadian politician (born 1934)

Member of Parliament for Saskatoon—Dundurn
- In office December 12, 1988 – September 8, 1993
- Preceded by: first member
- Succeeded by: Morris Bodnar

Personal details
- Born: July 22, 1934 (age 91) Wadena, Saskatchewan
- Party: New Democratic Party
- Spouse: Dorothea Fisher
- Profession: hoistman, minister

Ronald Claude Fisher (born July 22, 1934) is a Canadian former politician. He represented the electoral district of Saskatoon—Dundurn in the House of Commons of Canada from 1988 to 1993 as a member of the New Democratic Party.
