= Onésime Dorval =

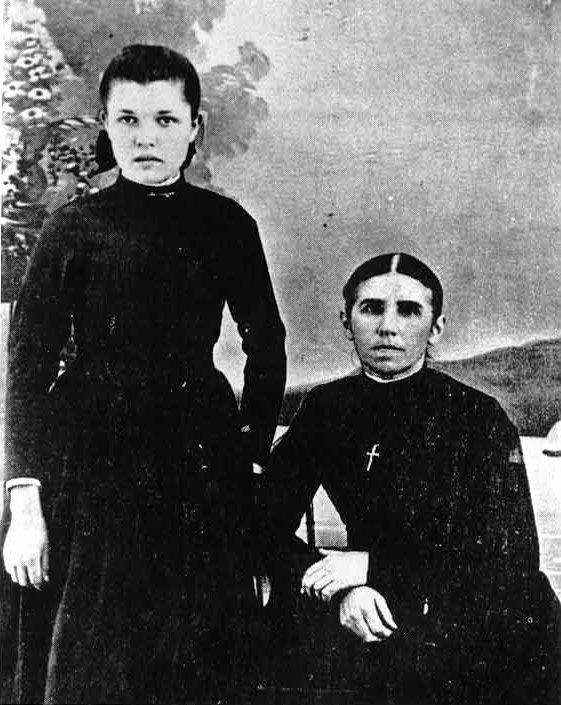
- Onésime Dorval (seated) with her adopted daughter Georgine d'Amours
- Born: 3 August 1845; Saint-Jérôme, Province of Canada
- Died: 10 December 1932 (aged 87); Rosthern, Saskatchewan, Canada
- Resting place: St. Michael’s Indian Residential School (Duck Lake)
- Occupation: Teacher
- Parent(s): Esther Brunette; Ignace Dorval

Onésime Dorval (3 August 1845 – 10 December 1932) was the first certified teacher in the province of Saskatchewan, Canada. She was a "talented painter and innovative woodworker", and became the "best known and most respected French-language teacher" in settlements throughout the northern plains of Saskatchewan.

She was a pioneer in bilingual education.

== Early life ==
Dorval was born to a Métis family in Sainte-Scholastique, in the Laurentians of the Province of Canada, on 3 August 1845. Her mother Esther Brunette and her carpenter father Ignace Dorval lived on a farm and moved to Saint-Jérôme when she was four years old. The petite girl was frail and in poor health throughout her childhood.

Her formal education began at the age of 10 in a convent school operated by the Sisters of Holy Cross at Sainte-Scholastique. A very good student, by the age of 18 she became a substitute teacher at l'École Modèle in Saint-Jérôme, during which time she would complete her studies and obtain a teaching certificate.

Her increasing devotion to her Roman Catholic faith led her to join the congregation of the Sisters of Holy Cross, who had established a convent school at Saint-Jérôme. Spurned because of her poor health, she travelled to the monastery of the congregation Sisters of the Good Shepherd in New York. There, she learned English. Before taking the final of three vows required to become a nun, she was told by a superior she was too susceptible to illness and may not be able to handle the duties required of her. She was not permitted to take her final vows, and was dismissed from the convent. Disappointed that she would not be a nun, she set to find opportunities for her other passion, teaching.

== Missionary teaching ==
Her health began to improve at this time. In 1876 she met a missionary named Albert Lacombe, who in 1872 had established a mission at Fort Garry to promote the colonization of Manitoba. From him she learned that Vital-Justin Grandin, a bishop of the Missionary Oblates of Mary Immaculate in St. Albert (then part of the Northwest Territories), was seeking Roman Catholic "women to work as teachers and housekeepers" in missions throughout Western Canada. In 1877, the bishop accepted her request to work in one of the missions in the Northwest Territories, and Dorval embarked on the long trip to the Red River Colony. She crossed Lake Superior by boat from Sault Ste. Marie in the east to Duluth, Minnesota, in the west, from which she travelled by train to the river port Fisher's Landing, then by steamboat along the Red River to Saint Boniface, where she arrived in late August. She arrived with an orphan girl named Marie Giroux she had adopted.

As a result of conflicts in the Prairies and Grandin's impending trip to France to secure funding for his missions, Dorval stopped at Fort Garry (Baie St. Paul). Dorval taught the Métis children there until 1880, then continued her westward trip.

She travelled as part of a company of nineteen Red River carts with Giroux on a gruelling two and a half month trip, beginning on 24 June 1880 and led by Louis Chatelain. She would often walk ahead of the caravan, and once remarked that the environment she observed "had power to charm the saddest of hearts", despite being inhospitable at times with prairie fires, ravenous mosquitoes, dust, as well as the sound of rickety ox carts and the bland food.

On 8 August 1880, the caravan camped at Stobart near a mission at Duck Lake, where Dorval was met by missionary Alexis André. He informed her that Grandin had sent him a letter authorizing Dorval to teach at Duck Lake, but could not produce the letter when requested by Chatelain. Dorval continued westward for another 27 days, stopping briefly at Fort Carlton and Fort Pitt on the way to Fort-des-Prairies. She was to stay with the Grey Nuns, but as there was insufficient housing, she went to Lac Ste. Anne, where Lacombe had operated a mission from 1852 to 1861.

The subsequent spring, Dorval and Giroux partially retraced their steps, arriving at St. Laurent de Grandin. Accompanied by bishop Grandin, they had travelled some of that journey by boat, and the final portion by a loaned buckboard with Grandin driving and Giroux seated on the baggage. They arrived on 26 July 1881, sooner than anticipated by its missionary leader Father Vital Fourmond, who was whitewashing the buildings in preparation and attired accordingly (French: "accoutré pour la circonstance", dressed for the occasion). She described it as a "poor little church" ("une bien pauvre petite église") amidst austere poverty.

During her time there, she convinced brother Piquet to erect a statue in a tree trunk. When complete, she and father Fourmond would lead the children in a recitation of the rosary, a tradition still practiced today. She spent two years there, until the Faithful Companions of Jesus opened a convent school in June 1883. Mission documents record that Dorval was known and beloved for her kindness and teaching skills. She left the mission after being recruited by Father A. Bigonesse to teach at St. Vital School in Battleford. She arrived on 2 September 1883, and would teach and cook for the mission until 1896. Helping to establish the school, she used her carpentry skills to assist in its construction and to build furniture for it. During the North-West Rebellion in 1885, mission residents took refuge at Fort Battleford, designated a National Historic Site of Canada in 1923 to commemorate its role in the rebellion.

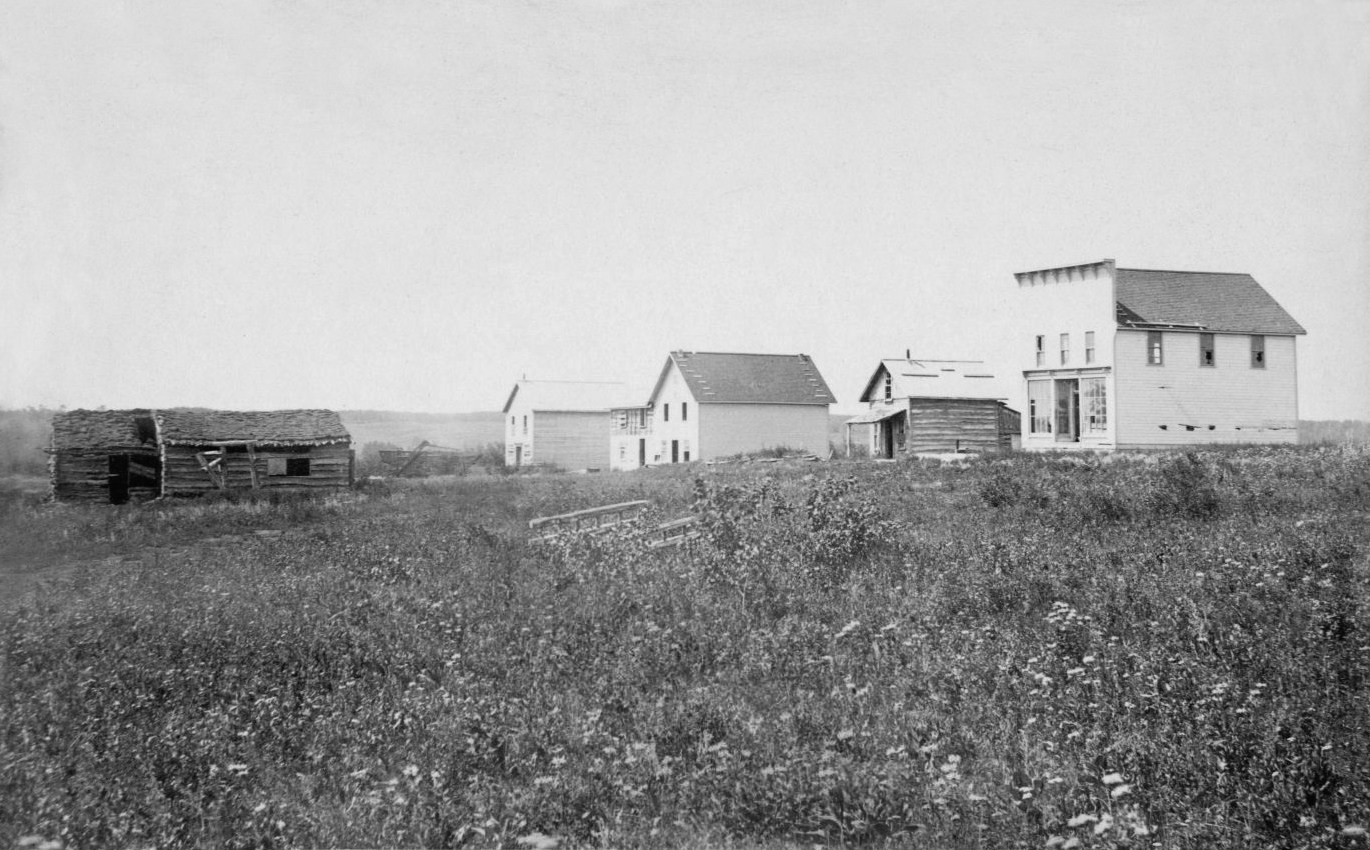
The village of Batoche in the North-West Territories in 1885

Dorval moved to the Métis community of Batoche in 1896 which consisted of many former residents of St. Laurent de Grandin. There, she and father Julien Moulin split the use of a rectory, a building that still exists in the Batoche National Historic Site. In addition to teaching the usual curriculum, she also taught crafts and music, the latter using a harmonium, performed household duties for father Moulin, and provided room and board for some children. They were housed in the rectory, girls in an annex with Dorval, and boys in the dining room or a shed behind the annex.

On 19 August 1913, the Sisters of the Presentation of Mary organized a celebration to mark Dorval's 50 years of teaching. It was held in Duck Lake, at St. Michael's Residential School, and was attended by Grandin, Moulin, and by vicars and many missionaries from surrounding missions. H. Delmas introduced her during the proceedings.

A thriving community when she arrived, Batoche experienced many economic and social hardships in the early 1900s, some precipitated by the community being bypassed by the Canadian Pacific Railway. Tuberculosis also had a deleterious impact on Batoche. With the community in decline and few children to teach, in 1914 she moved to Duck Lake. She taught for one year at Notre-Dame-de-Pontmain in Aldina (near Marcelin), then returned to St. Laurent de Grandin where she taught from 1915 to 1921 before retiring with the Sisters of the Presentation of Mary congregation at Duck Lake.

For the remainder of her life, she continued her missionary activities and community involvement, and wrote her memoirs. Dorval died at the Rosthern hospital, southwest of Duck Lake, on 10 December 1932. A funeral ceremony conducted on 13 December 1932 at the chapel adjoining St. Michael's Indian Residential School was well attended by white people, First Nations, and Métis. She is interred at the grounds of the St. Michael's Indian Residential School.

== Legacy ==
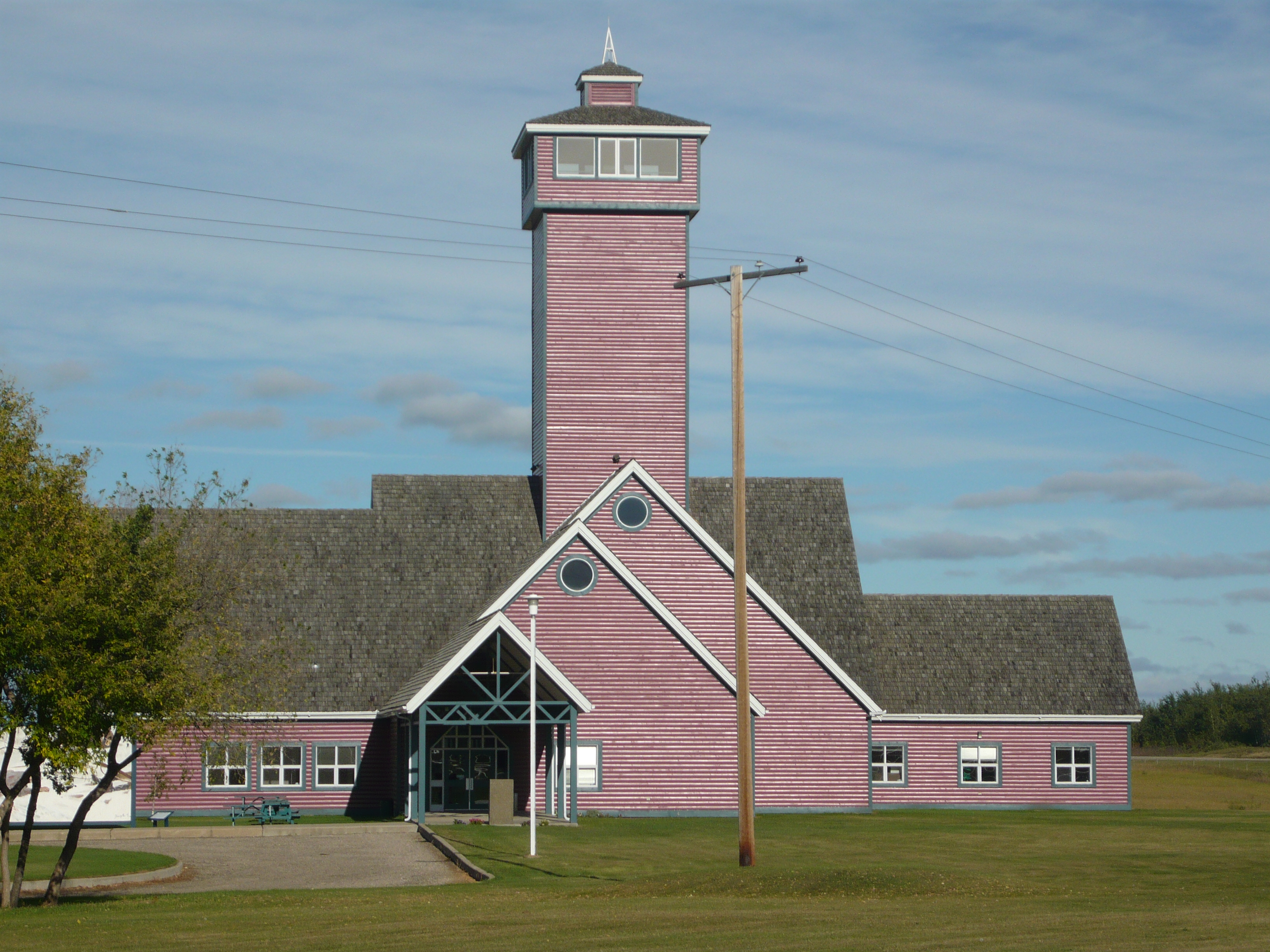
The Duck Lake Regional Interpretive Centre

On 7 June 1954, she was registered in the Persons of National Historic Significance, a register of people designated by the Government of Canada as being nationally significant in the history of the country. Two plaques have been installed in her honour, one at Duck Lake, unveiled on 29 October 2002 by Sheila Copps. The harmonium she used to teach music is now at the Duck Lake Regional Interpretive Centre, and one of her paintings hangs at the Batoche National Historic Site.

The Government of Saskatchewan officially named four small islands in the North Saskatchewan River in her honour on 9 August 1969. The Dorval Islands are located at 52º39'N 108º9'W, southeast and downstream of Battleford and North Battleford, and northwest of Denholm.
