= Market Mall (Saskatoon) =

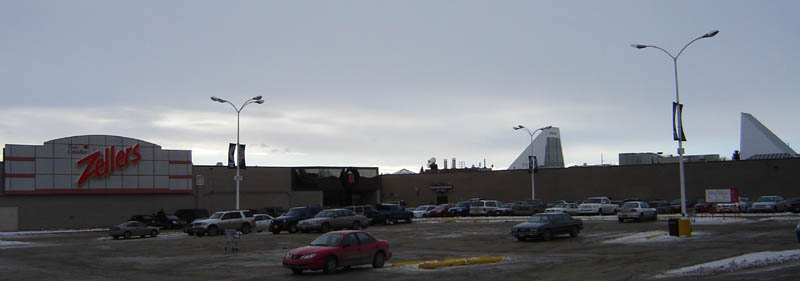
- Market Mall facing East, McEown Avenue entrance. The former Zellers (now Giant Tiger) can be seen in this photo.
- Location: Saskatoon, Saskatchewan, Canada
- Coordinates: 52.10129°N 106.62005°W
- Address: 2325 Preston Avenue South
- Opened: Nov. 22, 1966
- Manager: Redcliff Realty Management
- Owner: Strathallen Management Corporation
- Num. of stores: over 90
- Num. of anchor tenants: 3
- Floor area: 285,611 sq ft (26,534.1 m^{2})
- Floors: 1
- Parking: 921 surface, 452 in two-level underground parkade
- Website: saskatoonmarketmall.com

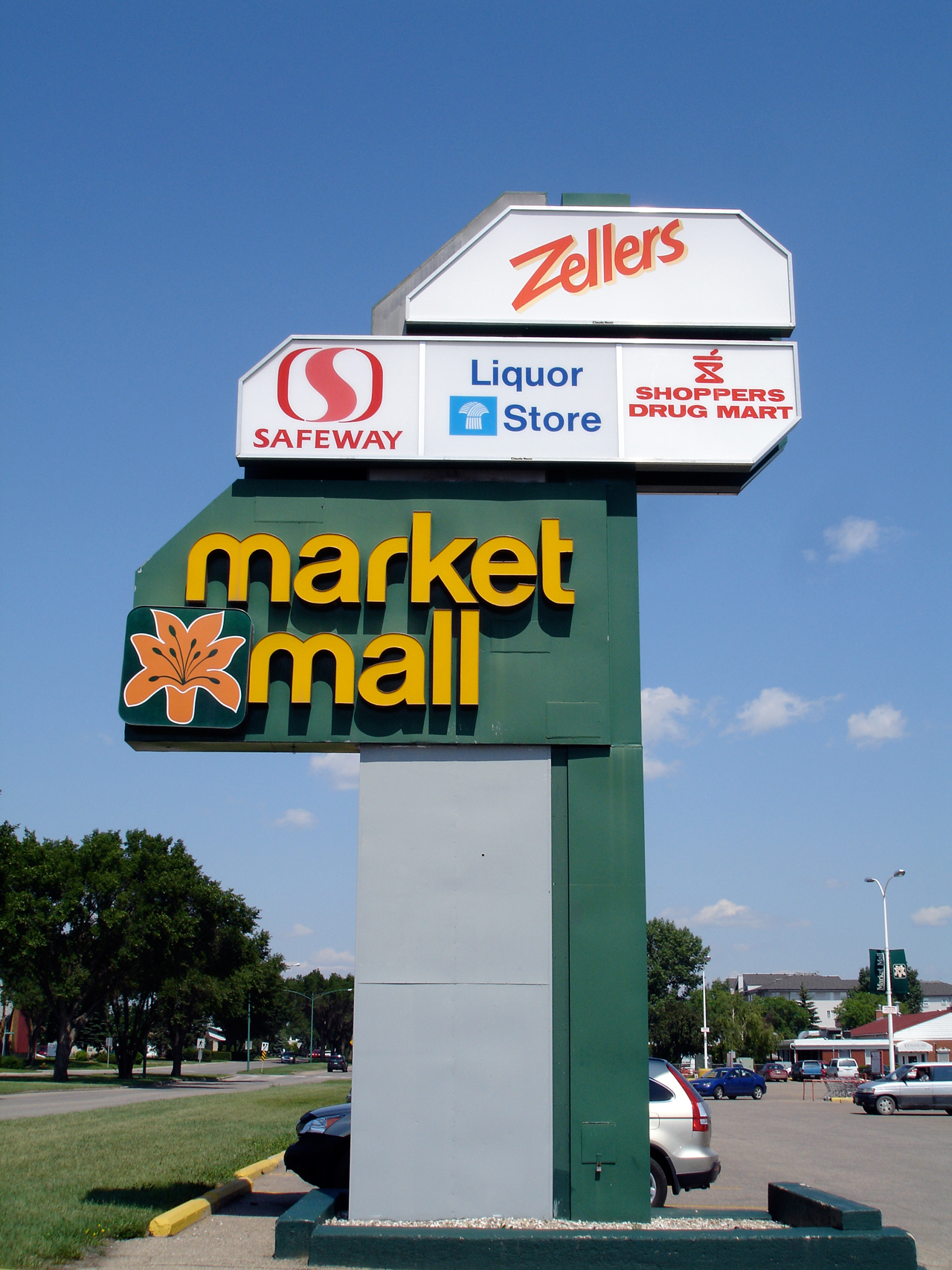
Market Mall sign with Zellers logo on the top

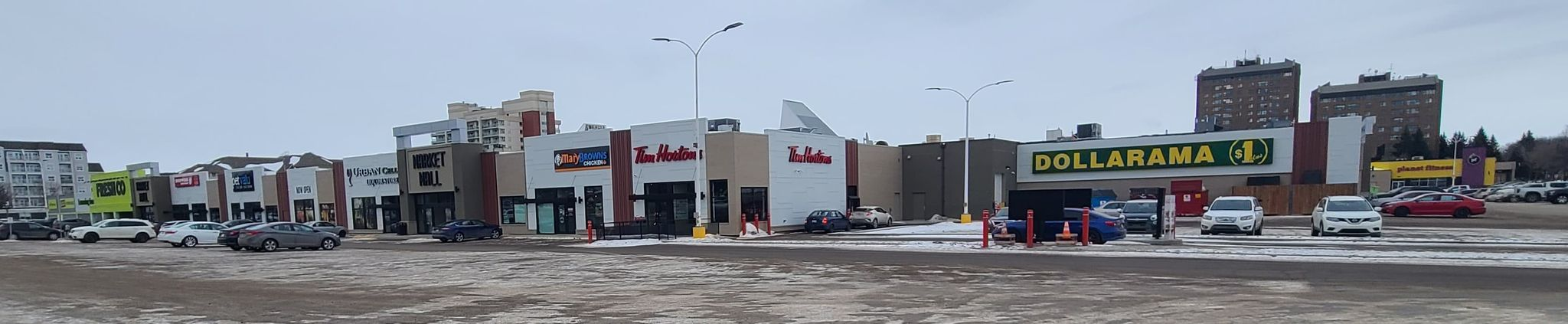
Market Mall facing West, Preston Avenue entrance in the early 2020s with new exterior shops after renovations, seniors' complex tower visible in background.

Market Mall is a shopping centre located in the Nutana Suburban Centre neighbourhood on the east side of Saskatoon, Saskatchewan, Canada. Built in the 1960s as Saskatoon's first enclosed shopping centre, it has undergone four major expansions since the late 1970s and now houses approximately 90 stores and services, anchored as of January 2021 by Giant Tiger, Planet Fitness and FreshCo. It also contains an 18-hole indoor miniature golf course, a branch of Service Canada, and a six-bay City of Saskatoon Transit terminal that was added in 2006. A branch of the Dollarama discount chain opened in 2014, replacing a bingo hall that had operated in the mall for a number of years.

Market Mall is located on Preston Avenue on land bounded by Adelaide Street to the North, Louise Street to the South; Preston Ave South to the West, and McEown Avenue to the East.

Former anchor tenants have included Zellers, Kmart, Canadian Tire, Stedmans and a department store that at varying times used the brandings Macleods and Gambles before it was finally closed in the early 1990s. When the mall first opened, and continuing until its first major renovation, a unique feature was an "open air" format that saw most walls between stores being only eight feet tall, creating what was described as a market atmosphere.

In September 2011, it was reported that Target Canada, as part of its takeover of the Zellers chain, had purchased the leasehold for the Market Mall location with the possibility of it being converted to a Target store in the future. Prior to this, in June 2011, mall management announced that the Zellers location would close in 2012 to facilitate plans to build an 18,000-sq.-ft. expansion to the mall and add a residential component. Ultimately, the Zellers location did close in the spring of 2012, and the department-store sized bay did not become a Target, remaining vacant for several years and used for a succession of seasonal and short-term retailers.

In spring of 2011 Hanger's closed its doors and the space sat vacant for three and a half years before Dollarama opened in spring of 2014

In March 2018, the mall changed ownership. The new owners announced that the plans to add 440 condominium units had been cancelled, and that the bay formerly occupied by Zellers would be taken over by two new anchor tenants, Giant Tiger and Planet Fitness. Both opened for business in the fall of 2018. In July 2019, Sobeys announced that the Safeway at Market Mall and three other locations in Saskatoon would be closed and converted to its discount banner FreshCo in 2020.

In June 2021, a fire broke out in the mall's Dollarama location. Although quickly extinguished and causing $100,000 in damages, the fire led to portions of the mall being closed for several weeks. Coinciding with the closure, work began on renovations to the interior of the mall, including the temporary closure of the miniature golf course; several new retailers have been announced as joining the mall, including a branch of Tim Hortons. The renovations were completed by the end of 2021.

== Expansions ==
During the history of the mall, it has undergone 4 major expansions.

- 1980: 4,738 sq. metre expansion off the southeast corner of the mall added a number of shops as well as a liquor store. The mall's "open air market" format was also adjusted, closing the open spaces between each retailer.
- 1982: 3,500 sq. metre expansion on the west side of the mall allowed Canada Safeway to double the size of its store and added Mark's Work Wearhouse as a new anchor tenant.
- 1987: 4,000 sq. metre expansion sparked by the departure of Canadian Tire from the mall added a food court and more retail to the northeast side of the mall. This project also included an expansion of the mall's parking lot with the demolition of a neighbouring car wash and a one-storey building formerly used by the Nutana branch of the Royal Canadian Legion.
- 1992: 8,000 sq. metre expansion following the closure of Macleod's added a Kmart (later Zellers) anchor store and added an indoor miniature golf course attraction, underground parking, and a transit hub. The 1980 expansion was also reconfigured.
- While not an expansion, in 2018 the anchor bay formerly occupied by Zellers and vacant since 2012 was redeveloped into several smaller retailers, including new anchors Giant Tiger and Planet Fitness and a relocated Fabricland outlet. A new entrance to the mall was added with the Giant Tiger renovation.
- Several new businesses were added to the western side of the mall in the fall of 2021, including Mary Brown's Fried Chicken and Tim Hortons; these businesses do not have interior mall access.

== Anchor tenants ==
- FreshCo (since 2020)
- Giant Tiger (since 2018)
- Planet Fitness (since 2018)
- Fabricland (since 2000)
- Dollarama (since 2014)

== Former anchor tenants ==
- Safeway 1966-2019
- Macleods 196?-197?
- Gambles 1978-1990
- Canadian Tire 1970-1986 (Relocated to Circle Park Mall in 1986 and relocated again to Preston Crossing in 2003)
- Kmart 1992-1997
- Zellers 1998-2012
- Hangers 2001-2011
- SLGA Liquor Store 1991-2017
- BiWay 1990-1999
- Mark's Work Wearhouse 1982-1990

== See also ==
- List of shopping malls in Saskatoon
- Nutana Suburban Centre
- Market Mall, Calgary
