= Tracy Muggli =

Canadian senator

The Honourable Tracy Muggli

Canadian Senator from Saskatchewan
- Incumbent
- Assumed office August 16, 2024
- Nominated by: Justin Trudeau
- Appointed by: Mary Simon

Personal details
- Born: September 18, 1965 (age 61) Muenster, Saskatchewan, Canada
- Party: Progressive Senate Group
- Other political affiliations: Liberal (until 2024)
- Education: University of Saskatchewan; University of Regina (BSW); Carleton University (MSW)
- Profession: Politician; social worker; hospital administrator

Tracy Ann Muggli (born September 18, 1965) is a politician, hospital administrator and registered social worker. She was appointed to the Senate of Canada on August 16, 2024, on the recommendation of Prime Minister Justin Trudeau. At the time of her appointment, Muggli was executive director of St. Paul's Hospital in Saskatoon. She had previously been director of mental health and addiction services with the Saskatoon Health Region and has also taught courses at the University of Regina's Faculty of Social Work.

== Early life and education ==
Muggli was born in Muenster, Saskatchewan, but has spent most of her life in Saskatoon since moving there in 1984.

Muggli graduated from the University of Saskatchewan and also has a Bachelor of Social Work from the University of Regina, and a Master of Social Work from Carleton University.

== Political career ==
Muggli was previously a Liberal candidate in Saskatoon—Grasswood in the 2015 and 2019 Canadian federal election. However, her 2019 result was also "the strongest showing of the Liberal candidates" running in Saskatoon.

== Honours ==
Honours Muggli has received include the Queen Elizabeth II Platinum Jubilee Medal, a YWCA Woman of Distinction Award, and the Saskatchewan Premier's Award for Excellence in Public Service.

== Electoral history ==
2019 Canadian federal election: Saskatoon—Grasswood
Party	Candidate	Votes	%	±%	Expenditures
Conservative	Kevin Waugh	26,336	53.3	+11.7	$32,265.34
New Democratic	Erika Ritchie	12,672	25.6	-4.5	none listed
Liberal	Tracy Muggli	8,419	17.0	-9.4	$50,741.23
Green	Neil Sinclair	1,320	2.7	+0.9	$335.36
People's	Mark Friesen	692	1.4	-	none listed
Total valid votes/expense limit		49,439	100.0		
Total rejected ballots		337			
Turnout		49,776	77.6		
Eligible voters		64,150			
Conservative hold		Swing		+8.10	
Source: Global News, Elections Canada

2015 Canadian federal election: Saskatoon—Grasswood
Party	Candidate	Votes	%	±%	Expenditures
Conservative	Kevin Waugh	19,166	41.58	-8.64	$68,859.20
New Democratic	Scott Bell	13,909	30.18	-9.66	$103,289.43
Liberal	Tracy Muggli	12,165	26.4	+19.09	$63,065.97
Green	Mark Bigland-Pritchard	846	1.84	-0.65	$2,839.31
Total valid votes/expense limit		46,086	100.0		$194,681.77
Total rejected ballots		137	–	–	
Turnout		46,223	78.59	–	
Eligible voters		58,810			
Conservative hold		Swing		-9.13	
Source: Elections Canada
