= Kevin Waugh =

Canadian politician and television sports journalist

Kevin Waugh MP
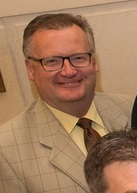

Member of Parliament for Saskatoon South Saskatoon—Grasswood (2015–2025)
- Incumbent
- Assumed office October 19, 2015
- Preceded by: Lynne Yelich

Saskatchewan Conservative Caucus Chair
- Incumbent
- Assumed office December 4, 2019
- Preceded by: Randy Hoback

Saskatoon Public School Division Trustee
- In office November 1, 2006 – October 27, 2015
- Preceded by: Lindsay Fast
- Succeeded by: Charmaine Bellamy

Personal details
- Born: June 9, 1956 (age 69) Saskatoon, Saskatchewan, Canada
- Party: Conservative
- Spouse: Ann Waugh
- Profession: Broadcaster

Kevin Waugh MP (born June 9, 1956) is a Canadian politician and former television sports journalist. Waugh was first elected to represent the riding of Saskatoon—Grasswood in the House of Commons of Canada in the 2015 Canadian federal election. During the 43rd Canadian Parliament Waugh's private member bill An Act to amend the Criminal Code (sports betting) was adopted to legalize betting on single sport events in Canada.

== Broadcasting career ==
Prior to his election as an MP, Waugh had been a longtime sportscaster with CTV Saskatoon.

== Political career ==
=== School Trustee ===
From 2006 to 2015, Waugh served as the Ward 9 Trustee for the Saskatoon Public School Division.

=== Conservative Nomination ===
Prior to the 2015 election, Waugh defeated incumbent Member of Parliament and Cabinet Minister Lynne Yelich, who had previously served as the Minister of State for Western Economic Diversification and Minister of State (Foreign Affairs and Consular) in the nomination race for the newly created riding of Saskatoon-Grasswood, which was replacing the former riding of Blackstrap. Waugh stated at the time that "Lynne was a great M.P., I have no issues with her" and that "we haven't had a Saskatoon MP from the city for a long time". Waugh had previously served as President of the Blackstrap Conservative Association while Yelich was the Member of Parliament for the riding.

=== Member of Parliament ===
In the 2015 election, Waugh was elected by a margin of nearly 5,000 votes over his closest opponent, Scott Bell of the New Democratic Party. Following the selection of Rona Ambrose as interim leader of the Conservative Party of Canada, Waugh was appointed as the Deputy Critic for Canadian Heritage. Waugh was also appointed to the House of Commons Standing Committee on Canadian Heritage.

In 2016, at a sports award ceremony, Waugh claimed that female athletes are treated as good or better than their male counterparts. That comment received heavy criticism from female and male athletes alike, and concern given that Waugh's spot on the Canadian parliamentary committee examining women and girls in sport.

On February 26, 2016, Waugh introduced Bill C-241: An Act to amend the Excise Tax Act (school authorities). This legislation would have increased the goods and services tax rebate that schools and school boards received from 68% to 100%, effectively exempting schools from paying the tax. Despite support from members of his own Conservative Party, the New Democratic Party and the Bloc Québécois, the bill was defeated at second reading by the Liberal majority.

Upon the election of Andrew Scheer as leader of the Conservative Party in May 2017, Waugh was named Deputy Shadow Minister for Crown-Indigenous Relations and Northern Affairs, Indigenous Services, and the Canadian Northern Economic Development Agency. In this role, Waugh served on the Standing Committee on Indigenous and Northern Affairs.

Waugh was re-elected with an increased vote count and vote share in the 2019 Canadian Federal Election, receiving more than twice as many votes as his closest challenger. On December 4, 2019, Waugh was elected as the Chair of the Conservative Party's Saskatchewan Regional Caucus. This position is responsible for chairing meetings of the regional caucus and presenting the results and decisions of those meetings to party leadership. During the 43rd Canadian Parliament Waugh's private member bill An Act to amend the Criminal Code (sports betting) (Bill C-218) was adopted to allow a province's lottery corporation to offer betting on single sport events, athletic contests, races and fights.

In July 2021, Waugh voted against a bill to ban LGBT conversion therapy. He was one of 62 Conservative MPs to vote against the bill.

=== #BeLikeBruce ===
In recognition of his contributions to the community, retired police officer Bruce Gordon was bestowed the Saskatoon-Grasswood Canada 150 Award by Waugh. In addition to his career as a police officer with the Saskatoon Police Service and dedication to the athletic community, Gordon was a volunteer and offered his time to PRIDE Saskatoon, the Saskatoon Road Runners Club, John Lake Home and School Council, the Saskatoon Sexual Assault Centre, and may other local organizations.

== Bill C-250 (Holocaust-denial amendment) ==
In February 2022, Waugh introduced Private Member’s Bill C-250, titled An Act to amend the Criminal Code (prohibition: promotion of antisemitism). The bill sought to amend section 319 of the Criminal Code to make it a criminal offence—punishable by up to two years in prison—to publicly condone, deny, or downplay the Holocaust, outside of a private conversation.

On April 27, 2022, during the bill's second reading—strategically timed to coincide with Yom HaShoah (Holocaust Remembrance Day)—Waugh cited data from B'nai Brith Canada showing a 7.2% rise in antisemitic incidents in 2021. He characterized Holocaust denial not merely as offensive speech but as a key driver of radicalization and a direct threat to the Jewish community.

Although Waugh's bill garnered cross-party support in principle, it did not pass on its own. Instead, its provisions were incorporated by the federal government into the Budget Implementation Act, 2022, No. 1 (Bill C-19), a large omnibus bill. Division 21 of Part 5 of the budget bill contained the Holocaust-denial clause in substantially the same form as Waugh’s original bill. This legislative maneuver drew criticism from organizations like the Canadian Bar Association, which objects to the practice of using budget bills to enact substantive, non-financial changes to the Criminal Code, arguing it prevents proper parliamentary scrutiny and debate. The budget act received Royal Assent on June 23, 2022, officially enacting Holocaust denial as a criminal offence in Canada.

The Centre for Israel and Jewish Affairs (CIJA) was among the advocacy groups that lauded the new law, crediting Waugh’s initiative with prompting the government to adopt the measure.

=== Public Opposition and Legal Critique ===
The Holocaust-denial provision championed by Waugh drew notable public criticism, particularly during the Senate debate. On June 14, 2022, Senator Paula Simons delivered a prominent speech opposing that section of the omnibus bill. She called its inclusion a "stealth addition" that prevented focused debate and warned it risked giving Holocaust deniers a "platform to play the martyr," which could paradoxically fuel antisemitic narratives rather than curtail them.

To illustrate her point, she referenced the historical case of James Keegstra, an Alberta teacher prosecuted in the 1980s for promoting antisemitic hate speech, including Holocaust denial, to his students. Critics note that Keegstra's prolonged legal saga, which spanned over a decade, inadvertently amplified his public profile and provided him a national stage for his hateful ideology.

This case study also formed the basis for another key criticism: that the new law was legally redundant. Opponents point out that the Keegstra prosecution demonstrates that the existing general hate speech law (section 319(2) of the Criminal Code) could already be used to prosecute Holocaust denial.

Further legal critiques focused on the structure of the new offence. The law imports the same defences available for the general hate speech offence, including the defence that the statements communicated were "true". The Canadian Bar Association argued this creates a legal paradox, as the law criminalizes Holocaust denial on the premise that it is inherently false, yet provides a defence that could allow a trial to "devolve into a forum to air conspiracy theories" as an accused attempts to prove the truth of their denial.

=== Constitutional Context and Historical Note ===
Despite these criticisms, the law is widely considered to be constitutional. This is based on the Supreme Court of Canada's landmark 1990 ruling in R v Keegstra, which upheld the general hate speech law. In a 4-3 decision, the Court found that while the law infringes on freedom of expression, it is a "reasonable limit" that is "demonstrably justified in a free and democratic society".

For clarity, it is important to distinguish Waugh's 2022 Bill C-250 from an earlier, more famous bill with the same number. In 2004, Bill C-250, introduced by NDP MP Svend Robinson, became law and amended the Criminal Code's hate propaganda sections to include "sexual orientation" as a protected identifiable group. The shared bill number is a coincidence of parliamentary procedure.

=== Controversies ===
On February 2, 2022, Waugh posted a picture on his Twitter page of himself, as well as former Conservative Party leader Andrew Scheer, Battlefords-Lloydminster MP Rosemarie Falk, Moose Jaw-Lake Centre-Lanigan MP Fraser Tolmie, Regina-Lewvan MP Warren Steinley and Sen. Denise Batters standing with the Saskatchewan flag at the Freedom Convoy 2022. The mayor of Ottawa, Jim Watson, demanded an apology, as he felt the protestors actions were not welcomed and that "MPs and senator in the picture should know better."

== Personal life ==
Kevin Waugh lives in Saskatoon with his wife Ann, with whom he has two children and one granddaughter.

== Electoral record ==
=== Federal ===
2025 Canadian federal election: Saskatoon South
** Preliminary results — Not yet official **
Party	Candidate	Votes	%	±%	Expenditures
Conservative	Kevin Waugh	24,516	49.29	+0.04	
Liberal	Rokhan Sarwar	20,107	40.43	+26.06	
New Democratic	Jacob Gadzella	4,498	9.04	–21.59	
Green	Hamish Graham	310	0.62	–0.61	
People's	Richard Brent Wintringham	308	0.62	–3.90	
Total valid votes/expense limit					
Total rejected ballots					
Turnout		49,739	71.97		
Eligible voters		69,109			
Conservative notional hold		Swing		–13.01	
Source: Elections Canada

2021 Canadian federal election: Saskatoon—Grasswood
Party	Candidate	Votes	%	±%	Expenditures
Conservative	Kevin Waugh	22,760	49.9	-3.4	$40,482.04
New Democratic	Kyla Kitzul	13,720	30.1	+4.5	$20,635.41
Liberal	Rokhan Sarwar	6,460	14.2	-2.8	$44,977.86
People's	Mark Friesen	2,108	4.6	+3.2	none listed
Green	Gillian Walker	556	1.2	-0.2	$131.25
Total valid votes/expense limit		45,604	100.0	–	$105,310.10
Total rejected ballots		303			
Turnout		45,907	68.71%		
Eligible voters		66,817			
Source: Elections Canada

2019 Canadian federal election: Saskatoon—Grasswood
Party	Candidate	Votes	%	±%	Expenditures
Conservative	Kevin Waugh	26,336	53.3	+11.7	$32,265.34
New Democratic	Erika Ritchie	12,672	25.6	-4.5	none listed
Liberal	Tracy Muggli	8,419	17.0	-9.4	$50,741.23
Green	Neil Sinclair	1,320	2.7	+0.9	$335.36
People's	Mark Friesen	692	1.4	-	none listed
Total valid votes/expense limit		49,439	100.0		
Total rejected ballots		337			
Turnout		49,776	77.6		
Eligible voters		64,150			
Conservative hold		Swing		+8.10	
Source: Global News, Elections Canada

2015 Canadian federal election: Saskatoon—Grasswood
Party	Candidate	Votes	%	±%	Expenditures
Conservative	Kevin Waugh	19,166	41.58	-8.64	$68,859.20
New Democratic	Scott Bell	13,909	30.18	-9.66	$103,289.43
Liberal	Tracy Muggli	12,165	26.4	+19.09	$63,065.97
Green	Mark Bigland-Pritchard	846	1.84	-0.65	$2,839.31
Total valid votes/expense limit		46,086	100.0		$194,681.77
Total rejected ballots		137	–	–	
Turnout		46,223	78.59	–	
Eligible voters		58,810			
Conservative hold		Swing		-9.13	
Source: Elections Canada

=== Provincial ===
2003 Saskatchewan general election: Saskatoon Greystone
Party	Candidate	Votes	%	±%
New Democratic	Peter Prebble	4,287	49.09	+1.23
Saskatchewan	Kevin Waugh	2,844	32.57	-0.40
Liberal	Herta Barron	1,552	17.77	-1.40
New Green	Brian Berezowski	50	0.57	*
Total		8,733	100.00	

=== Municipal ===
2012 Saskatoon Public School Division, Public Trustee, Ward Nine
Candidate	Votes	%
Kevin Waugh	3,731	82.87
Nathan Schneider	771	17.13
Total	4,502	100.00

2009 Saskatoon Public School Division, Public Trustee, Ward Nine
Candidate	Votes	%
Kevin Waugh	Acclaimed	

2006 Saskatoon Public School Division, Public Trustee, Ward Nine
Candidate	Votes	%
Kevin Waugh	3,940	74.41
Morag MacPherson	1,355	25.59
Total	5,295	100.00
