= Rosthern =

Town in Saskatchewan, Canada

- Town
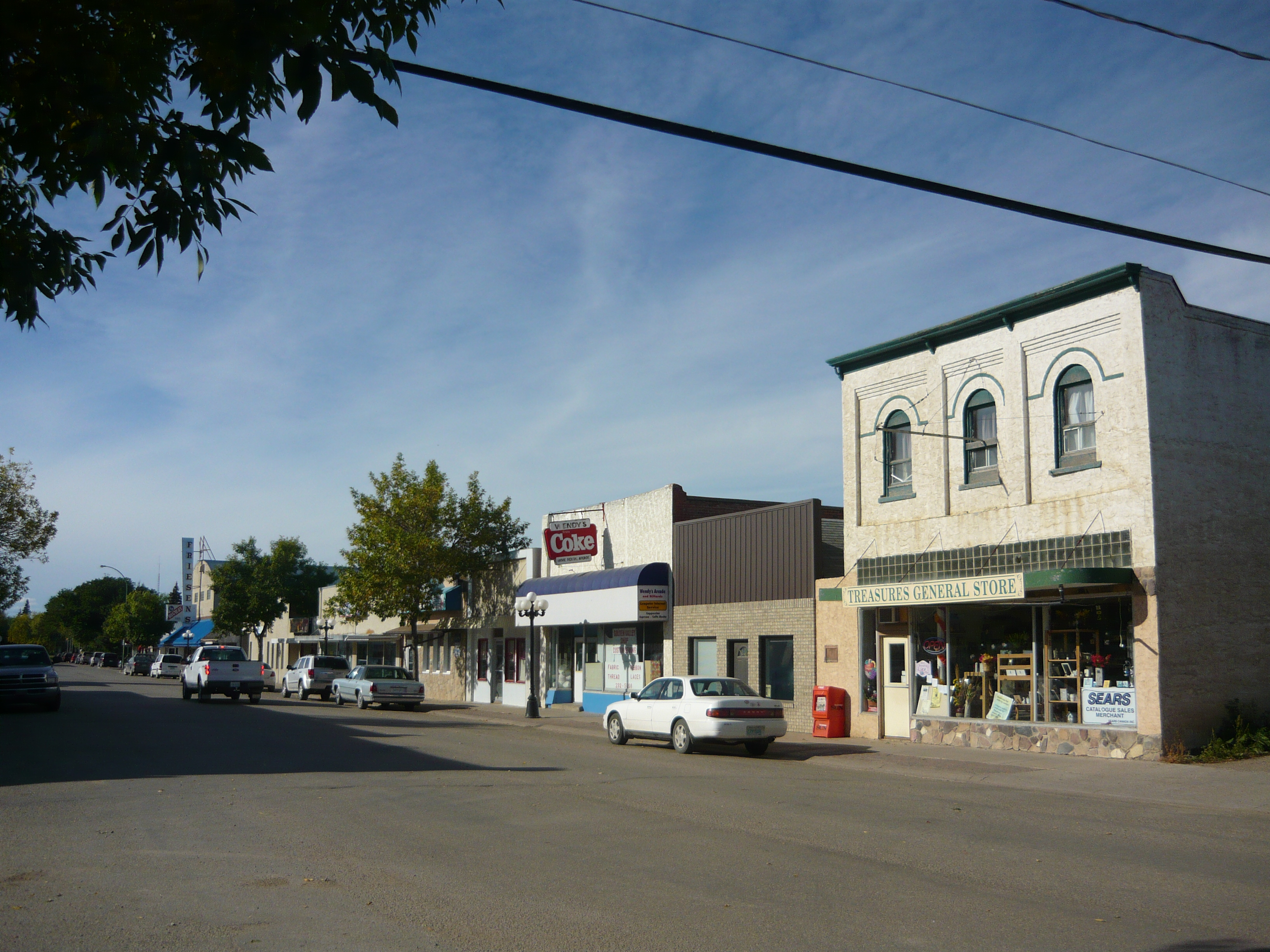
- Business District; Sixth Street

- Location within Saskatchewan Location within Canada
- Coordinates: 52°39′50″N 106°20′16″W
- Country: Canada
- Province: Saskatchewan
- Rural municipality: Rosthern No. 403
- Post office founded: 1893-09-01
- Village established: 1898
- Town incorporated: 1903

Government
  - Mayor: Dennis Helmuth
  - MP (Carlton Trail—Eagle Creek): Kelly Block
  - M.L.A. (Rosthern-Shellbrook): Scott Moe

Area
  - Total: 4.31 km^{2} (1.66 sq mi)

Population (2016)
  - Total: 1,688
  - Density: 392/km^{2} (1,020/sq mi)
- Time zone: UTC-6 (CST)
- Postal code: S0K 3R0
- Area code: 306
- Highways: Highway 11 / Highway 312
- Website: rosthern.com

Rosthern is a town at the juncture of Highway 11 and Highway 312 in central Saskatchewan, Canada. It is roughly halfway between the cities of Prince Albert and Saskatoon.

== History ==
Mennonite settlers, led by Gerhard Ens, began arriving in the area around 1890, with the establishment of the Qu'Appelle, Long Lake & Saskatchewan Railway to Prince Albert. The post office was established in 1893, and by 1898 the community achieved village status. In 1903, Rosthern was incorporated as a town.

There are several apocryphal versions of the story about how the town got its name. One is that in the late 1880s when the railway ran through from Regina to Prince Albert a man by the name of Ross drowned in the creek that flows through the town. Terne is old English for tarn meaning a pool, and the name stuck. In all likelihood, however, the town's name echoes an old world name brought over by a homesick worker on the railroad, in this case that of Rostherne, a village in the United Kingdom.

== Attractions and recreation ==
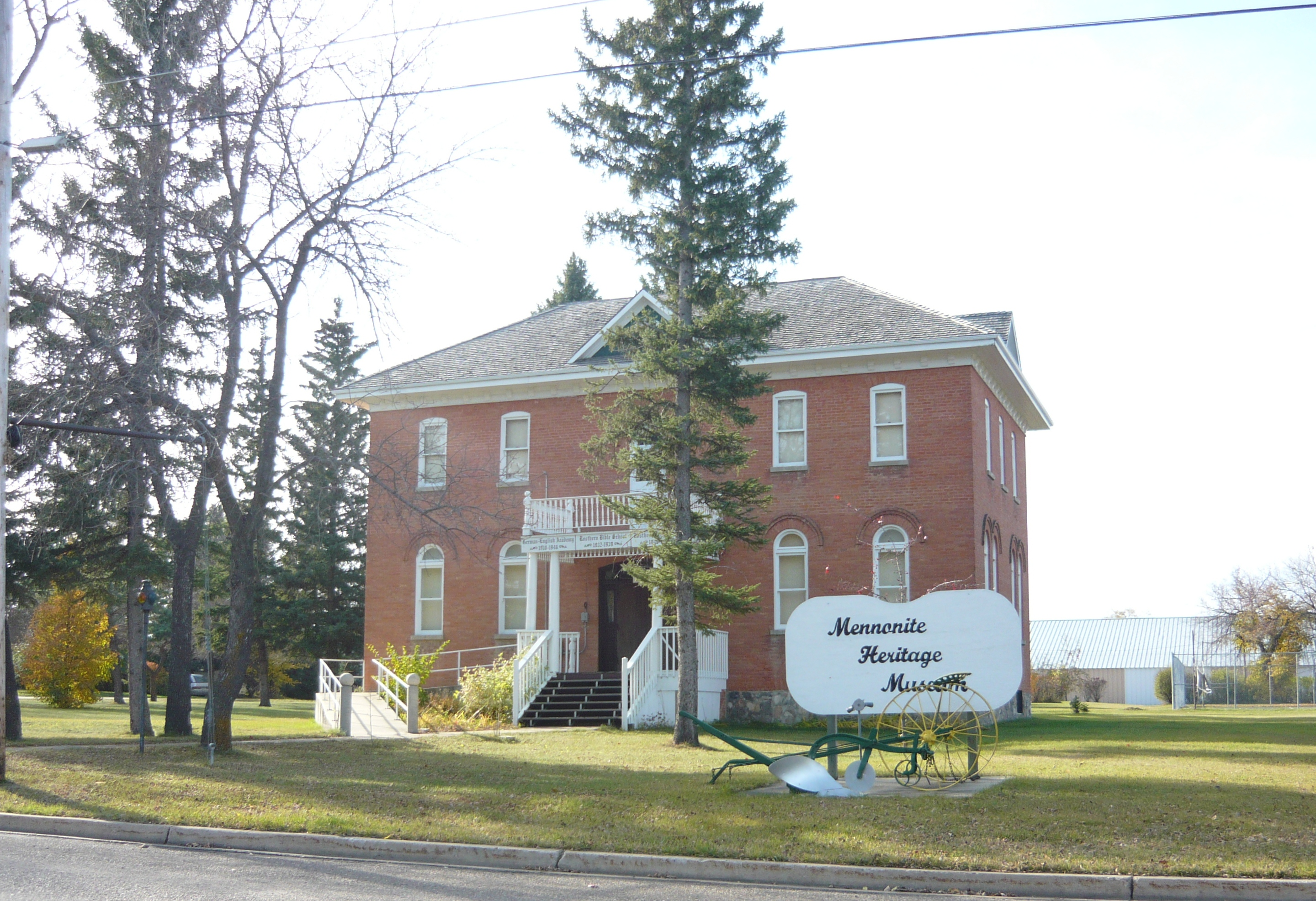
Mennonite Heritage Museum (1910)

Rosthern has a public library, many parks and walking trails, Valley Regional Park with an 18-hole grass green golf course, two ball-diamonds, two indoor hockey rinks, a curling rink, bowling alley, and three school gyms. An outdoor swimming pool was completed in 2005. Rosthern is also home to the Youth Farm Bible Camp.

Nearby Rosthern is the Seager Wheeler Farm, a National Historic Site of Canada, and the Rosthern Mennonite Heritage Museum (c. 1909–1910). It is a Municipal Heritage Property on the Canadian Register of Historic Places.

== Valley Regional Park ==
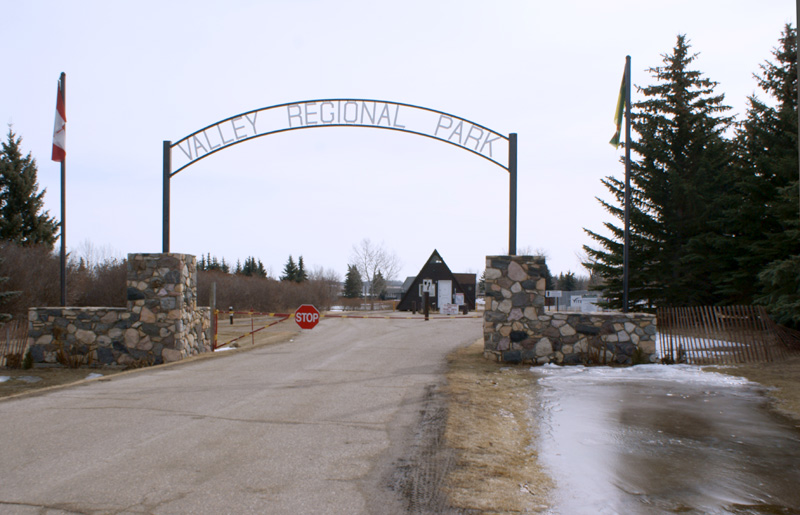
Valley Regional Park entrance

Valley Regional Park (52.6834°N 106.3006°W), founded in 1974, is a regional park about 2 kilometres (1.2 mi) north-east of Rosthern on the western shore of Rempel Lake. The park has an 18-hole golf course, campground, and picnic area. There is also a 100-foot slide and an 80-foot zip line. The campground has about 80 campsites and modern washrooms and showers. Access to the park is from Highway 11.

Valley Regional Park Golf Club is an 18-hole, par 72 course with grass greens and 6,577 total yards. There is a pro shop, practice green, and a licensed clubhouse.

In 2023, the park won the Park on the Move award.

== Churches ==
Rosthern is home to over ten churches including Mennonite, Ukrainian Orthodox, Swedenborgian, Pentecostal, Anglican, Roman Catholic, Ukrainian Catholic, Lutheran, Seventh-day Adventist, Christian & Missionary Alliance, and Baptist.

== Demographics ==
In the 2021 Census of Population conducted by Statistics Canada, Rosthern had a population of 1,602 living in 642 of its 694 total private dwellings, a change of −5.1% from its 2016 population of 1,688. With a land area of 4.14 km^{2} (1.60 sq mi), it had a population density of 387.0/km^{2} (1,002.2/sq mi) in 2021.

Canada census – Rosthern community profile

	2021	2016	2011
Population	1,602 (-5.1% from 2016)	1,688 (7.4% from 2011)	1,572 (13.7% from 2006)
Land area	4.14 km^{2} (1.60 sq mi)	4.31 km^{2} (1.66 sq mi)	4.31 km^{2} (1.66 sq mi)
Population density	386.9/km^{2} (1,002/sq mi)	392.0/km^{2} (1,015/sq mi)	365.0/km^{2} (945/sq mi)
Median age	41.2 (M: 40, F: 42.4)	43.3 (M: 41.8, F: 44.8)	46.0 (M: 43.6, F: 47.7)
Private dwellings	645 (total)	747 (total)	731 (total)
Median household income		$N/A	$N/A

References: 2021 2016 2011

== Notable people ==
- Bill Braden, politician
- George Braden, 2nd Premier of Northwest Territories
- Russ Brayshaw, hockey player
- Onésime Dorval, educator
- Wayne Elhard, politician
- Isaak Elias, politician
- Gerhard Ens, town founder
- Jerry Friesen, football player
- Ben Heppner, politician
- Jim Hrycuik, hockey player
- Roger Kortko, hockey player
- George Langley, politician
- Frederick Loveroff, artist
- Archibald Peter McNab, 6th Lieutenant Governor of Saskatchewan
- Myles Morin, politician
- Earle Morris, curler
- Barbara Nickel, writer
- Erdman Penner, Disney screenwriter
- Jim Penner, businessman and politician
- J. D. Denis Pelletier, judge
- Richie Regehr, hockey player
- Robyn Regehr, hockey player
- Jeanne Thomarat, artist
- Maurice Vellacott, politician
- Seager Wheeler, author
- Art Wiebe, hockey player
- Berny Wiens, politician

== See also ==
- List of towns in Saskatchewan
- List of communities in Saskatchewan
