= Jim Hrycuik =

Canadian ice hockey player

- Born: October 7, 1949 (age 75); Rosthern, Saskatchewan, Canada
- Height: 5 ft 10 in (178 cm)
- Weight: 180 lb (82 kg; 12 st 12 lb)
- Position: Centre
- Shot: Left
- Played for: Washington Capitals
- Playing career: 1970–1976

James Peter Hrycuik (born October 7, 1949) is a Canadian former ice hockey player. He played 21 games in the National Hockey League with the Washington Capitals. He scored the franchise's first goal, on October 9, 1974, against the New York Rangers. The rest of his career, which lasted from 1971 to 1976, was spent in the minor leagues.

== Career statistics ==
=== Regular season and playoffs ===
			Regular season					Playoffs
Season	Team	League	GP	G	A	Pts	PIM	GP	G	A	Pts	PIM
1970–71	Moose Jaw Canucks	SJHL	—	—	—	—	—	—	—	—	—	—
1971–72	Regina Capitals	ASHL	38	21	39	60	36	—	—	—	—	—
1972–73	Hershey Bears	AHL	36	3	7	10	22	—	—	—	—	—
1972–73	Fort Wayne Komets	IHL	25	12	11	23	35	9	7	5	12	6
1973–74	Hershey Bears	AHL	74	26	49	75	75	14	3	11	14	28
1974–75	Washington Capitals	NHL	21	5	5	10	12	—	—	—	—	—
1974–75	Richmond Robins	AHL	7	4	3	7	2	—	—	—	—	—
1975–76	Richmond Robins	AHL	56	6	13	19	43	8	3	1	4	0
NHL totals			21	5	5	10	12	—	—	—	—	—
