= Frederick Loveroff =

Canadian artist (1894-1959)

Frederick Nicholas Loveroff
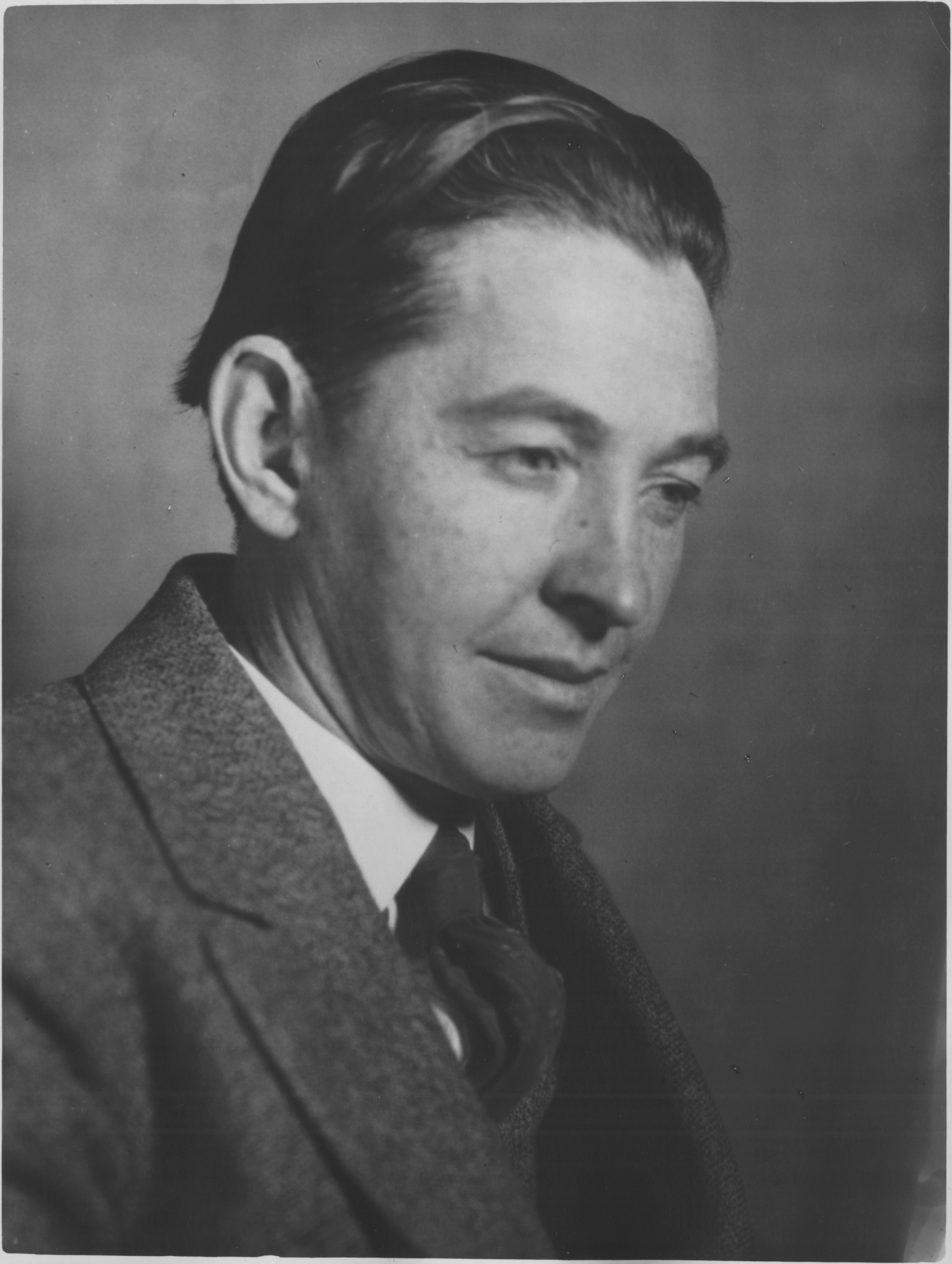
- Loveroff in 1930
- Born: Frederick Nicholas Postnikoff c. 8 June 1894; Terpaniye, Russia
- Died: 12 Aug. 1959; Redwood City, California
- Elected: Associate member, Royal Canadian Academy of Arts (1920-1933)

Frederick Loveroff (or F. N. Loveroff as he was also known) (1894 – August 12, 1959) was a painter, known for his landscapes and scenes of Canadian farms.

== Career ==
Loveroff was born in Terpeniye village, Kars region, Russia. His mother died when he was young and his father, a Doukhobor farmer, took him to live in Petrofka village, west of Rosthern, Saskatchewan in 1899. After studies at a Quaker school in Pennsylvania, he worked his own homestead near Borden, Saskatchewan.

During winter nights on the homestead, he taught himself watercolour and seeing one of these works, Colonel Perret, the Principal of his school, the Normal School in Regina, interested D. A. Dunlap, a Toronto mining magnate, in sponsoring an art education for the young man.

In 1913, at the age of nineteen, Loveroff moved to Toronto, changed his name to Loveroff, and attended the Central Ontario School of Art (today's OCAD). Here, he studied for the next four years with George Agnew Reid, J.W. Beatty, and J.E.H. MacDonald of the Group of Seven as well as William Cruikshank. He graduated in 1917 but even before then had begun to exhibit with the Royal Canadian Academy (RCA) and the Ontario Society of Artists (OSA). In 1920, he was elected an Associate member of the Royal Canadian Academy and in 1921, a member of the OSA. His painting career lasted from 1915 to 1934 when it ended likely due to the Depression. He left for California that year to make his living as a farmer and died in Redwood City in 1960 at the age of sixty-six. Loveroff compiled a phenomenal record of achievement in a few years of activity, wrote the curator of a show devoted to his work in 1981.

His work reflects the growing strength and popularity of Canadian Impressionism: he delighted in vibrant but subtle colour. One of the high points of his career was the acceptance of his painting Snow on the Hillside by the Leicester Museum & Art Gallery, England, after the painting had been exhibited at the British Empire Exhibition, a colonial exhibition held at Wembley Park, Wembley, England, from 23 April 1924 to 31 October 1925. His work was also part of group exhibitions at the Imperial Gallery of Art in London, England, and at the Musée du Jeu de Paume in Paris, France.

He is represented in the public collections of the National Gallery of Canada, Ottawa; Hart House (today the Justina M. Barnicke Gallery, Art Museum at the University of Toronto); the Art Gallery of Ontario; and the MacKenzie Art Gallery, Regina, among others.

His work fuses an insight into the satisfactions of Canadian farm and country life with a handling that marks him as a member of the group of Canadian Impressionists who ushered in new ways of seeing and depicting life in Canada.

== Record prices at auction ==
A work by Loveroff, Evening, Algonquin, an oil on board, 8 x 10 ins (20.3 x 25.4 cms), estimated at the Cowley-Abbott auction in Toronto at $3,000.00-$5,000.00 had a price realized of $38,520.00, December 14, 2021.
