= Russ Brayshaw =

Canadian ice hockey player

- Born: January 17, 1918 Rosthern, Saskatchewan, Canada
- Died: February 25, 1993 (aged 75) Abbotsford, British Columbia, Canada
- Height: 5 ft 8 in (173 cm)
- Weight: 164 lb (74 kg; 11 st 10 lb)
- Position: Left wing
- Shot: Left
- Played for: Chicago Black Hawks
- Playing career: 1938–1949

Russell Ambrose "Buster" Brayshaw (January 17, 1918 – February 25, 1993) was a Canadian professional ice hockey left wing who played 43 games in the National Hockey League with the Chicago Black Hawks during the 1944–45 season. He was a fill-in player for the Hawks while others served in the Second World War. Brayshaw spent the four following years in the American Hockey League.

He died in Abbotsford, British Columbia in 1993.

== Career statistics ==
=== Regular season and playoffs ===
| | | | Regular season | | | | | Playoffs |
| Season | Team | League | GP | G | A | Pts | PIM | GP | G | A | Pts | PIM |
|---|---|---|---|---|---|---|---|---|---|---|---|---|
| 1936–37 | Noranda Copper Kings | NOHA | — | 11 | 8 | 19 | — | — | — | — | — | — |
| 1937–38 | Saskatoon Quakers | SSHL | 16 | 2 | 1 | 3 | 4 | 5 | 0 | 0 | 0 | 0 |
| 1938–39 | Moose Jaw Millers | S-SSHL | 22 | 10 | 2 | 12 | 8 | 10 | 1 | 2 | 3 | 6 |
| 1939–40 | Moose Jaw Millers | S-SSHL | 32 | 9 | 8 | 17 | 40 | 7 | 1 | 1 | 2 | 4 |
| 1939–40 | Moose Jaw Millers | Al-Cup | — | — | — | — | — | 3 | 0 | 1 | 1 | 0 |
| 1940–41 | Moose Jaw Millers | S-SSHL | 30 | 11 | 11 | 22 | 14 | — | — | — | — | — |
| 1941–42 | Moose Jaw Millers | S-SSHL | 26 | 9 | 15 | 24 | 26 | 9 | 5 | 3 | 8 | 4 |
| 1942–43 | Victoria VMD | NNDHL | 18 | 16 | 15 | 31 | 16 | — | — | — | — | — |
| 1942–43 | New Westminster Spitfires | PCHL | 1 | 0 | 0 | 0 | 2 | 6 | 4 | 5 | 9 | 8 |
| 1943–44 | Seattle Ironmen | NorIHL | 2 | 1 | 1 | 2 | 0 | — | — | — | — | — |
| 1943–44 | New Westminster Spitfires | PCHL | 19 | 17 | 15 | 32 | 25 | 3 | 3 | 1 | 4 | 4 |
| 1943–44 | New Westminster Spitfires | Al-Cup | — | — | — | — | — | 15 | 21 | 8 | 29 | 10 |
| 1944–45 | Chicago Black Hawks | NHL | 43 | 5 | 9 | 14 | 24 | — | — | — | — | — |
| 1945–46 | Cleveland Barons | AHL | 57 | 24 | 24 | 48 | 37 | 5 | 1 | 1 | 2 | 0 |
| 1946–47 | Providence Reds | AHL | 38 | 10 | 16 | 26 | 27 | — | — | — | — | — |
| 1946–47 | St. Louis Flyers | AHL | 21 | 8 | 4 | 12 | 2 | — | — | — | — | — |
| 1947–48 | St. Louis Flyers | AHL | 7 | 2 | 2 | 4 | 6 | — | — | — | — | — |
| 1947–48 | Tulsa Oilers | USHL | 52 | 22 | 21 | 43 | 12 | 2 | 0 | 0 | 0 | 0 |
| 1948–49 | Vancouver Canucks | PCHL | 13 | 4 | 9 | 13 | 12 | — | — | — | — | — |
| 1948–49 | Seattle Ironmen | PCHL | 7 | 1 | 2 | 3 | 8 | — | — | — | — | — |
| 1948–49 | Saskatoon Quakers | WCSHL | 12 | 2 | 7 | 9 | 16 | — | — | — | — | — |
| AHL totals | | | 123 | 44 | 46 | 90 | 72 | 5 | 1 | 1 | 2 | 0 |
| NHL totals | | | 43 | 5 | 9 | 14 | 24 | — | — | — | — | — |
