= Blackstrap (electoral district) =

Federal electoral district in Saskatchewan, Canada

Saskatchewan electoral district
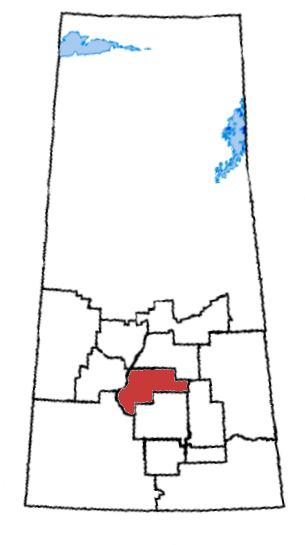
- Blackstrap in relation to other Saskatchewan federal electoral districts
- Coordinates: 51.692°N 105.664°W

Defunct federal electoral district
- Legislature: House of Commons
- District created: 1996
- District abolished: 2013
- First contested: 1997
- Last contested: 2011
- District webpage: profile, map

Demographics
- Population (2011): 85,541
- Electors (2011): 59,797
- Area (km²): 10,921.10
- Census division(s): Saskatoon
- Census subdivision(s): Saskatoon, Corman Park No. 344

Blackstrap was a federal electoral district in Saskatchewan, Canada, that had been represented in the House of Commons of Canada since 1997. It is named for Blackstrap Lake. The riding was abolished prior to the 2015 Canadian federal election.

== Geography ==
The riding included the southeast quadrant of the city of Saskatoon and extended south to Elbow, southeast to Bladworth, and east to Jansen.

== History ==
The electoral district was created in 1996 from Saskatoon—Dundurn and portions of Mackenzie, Moose Jaw—Lake Centre and Saskatoon—Humboldt ridings.

For the 2015 Canadian Federal election, the riding was abolished, with the Saskatoon portion becoming part of Saskatoon—Grasswood, while the rural portion became part of Moose Jaw—Lake Centre—Lanigan.

== Members of Parliament ==
This riding has elected the following members of the House of Commons:

Parliament	Years	Member	Party
Blackstrap; Riding created from Saskatoon—Dundurn, Mackenzie, Moose Jaw—Lake Centre and Saskatoon—Humboldt
36th	1997–2000	Allan Kerpan	Reform
36th	2000–2000	Allan Kerpan	Alliance
37th	2000–2003	Lynne Yelich	Alliance
37th	2003–2004	Lynne Yelich	Conservative
38th	2004–2006	Lynne Yelich	Conservative
39th	2006–2008	Lynne Yelich	Conservative
40th	2008–2011	Lynne Yelich	Conservative
41st	2011–2015	Lynne Yelich	Conservative
Riding dissolved into Moose Jaw—Lake Centre—Lanigan, Saskatoon—Grasswood and Regina—Qu'Appelle

== Election results ==
2011 Canadian federal election
Party	Candidate	Votes	%	±%	Expenditures
Conservative	Lynne Yelich	23,281	54.4	+0.5	$66,677
New Democratic	Darien Moore	15,768	36.8	+11.1	$59,199
Liberal	Deb Walker	2,713	6.3	-8.0	$13,295
Green	Shawn Setyo	1,033	2.4	-3.6	$0
Total valid votes/expense limit		42,795	100.0		–
Total rejected ballots		113	0.3	-0.1	
Turnout		42,908	70.6	+6.0	
Eligible voters		60,641	–	–	

2008 Canadian federal election
Party	Candidate	Votes	%	±%	Expenditures
Conservative	Lynne Yelich	20,747	53.9	+6.0	$68,414
New Democratic	Patti Gieni	9,876	25.7	-4.9	$30,120
Liberal	Deb Ehmann	5,509	14.3	-2.6	$24,743
Green	Imre Pallagi	2,325	6.0	+2.8	$3,352
Total valid votes/expense limit		38,456	100.0		$81,893
Total rejected ballots		152	0.4	+0.1	
Turnout		38,609	64.6	-4	

2006 Canadian federal election
Party	Candidate	Votes	%	±%	Expenditures
Conservative	Lynne Yelich	19,430	48.0	+6.5	$62,564
New Democratic	Don Kossick	12,376	30.6	+7.0	$41,367
Liberal	Herta Barron	6,841	16.9	-14.5	$25,287
Green	Mike Fornssler	1334	3.3	+0.2	$550
Independent	D. Jay Krozser	410	1.0	–	$4,469
Communist	Sonje Kristtorn	96	0.2	–	$515
Total valid votes		40,487	100.0		–
Total rejected ballots		105	0.3	0.0	
Turnout		40,592	69	+5	

2004 Canadian federal election
Party	Candidate	Votes	%	±%	Expenditures
Conservative	Lynne Yelich	15,608	41.5	+2.6	$71,019
Liberal	Tiffany Paulsen	11,815	31.4	+8.8	$50,307
New Democratic	Don Kossick	8,862	23.6	-2.8	$51,849
Green	Lynn Oliphant	1,168	3.1	+1.7	$25
Christian Heritage	Clayton Sundberg	177	0.5	–	–
Total valid votes		37,630	100.0		–
Total rejected ballots		98	0.3	0.0	
Turnout		37,728	64	-2	

Note: Conservative vote is compared to the total of the Canadian Alliance vote and Progressive Conservative vote in 2000 election.

2000 Canadian federal election
Party	Candidate	Votes	%	±%	Expenditures
Alliance	Lynne Yelich	16,028	44.2	+7.4	$40,528
New Democratic	Noreen Johns	9,551	26.4	-1.3	$43,141
Liberal	J. Wayne Zimmer	8,206	22.6	-5.7	$28,857
Progressive Conservative	Tim Stephenson	1,926	5.3	-1.3	$1,200
Green	Neil Sinclair	519	1.4	–	$17
Total valid votes		36,230	100.0		–
Total rejected ballots		93	0.3	-0.1	
Turnout		36,323	66	-4	

Note: Canadian Alliance vote is compared to the Reform vote in 1997 election.

1997 Canadian federal election
Party	Candidate	Votes	%	±%	Expenditures
Reform	Allan Kerpan	13,502	36.9	–	$31,124
Liberal	Morris Bodnar	10,365	28.3	–	$48,752
New Democratic	Steven Bobiash	10,117	27.6	–	$53,988
Progressive Conservative	Bob Chisholm	2,414	6.6	–	$9,565
Natural Law	Leon Laforge	208	0.6	–	$169
Total valid votes		36,606	100.0		–
Total rejected ballots		138	0.4		
Turnout		36,744	70		

== See also ==
- List of Canadian federal electoral districts
- Historical federal electoral districts of Canada
