= Minister of Human Resources and Social Development =

The Minister of Human Resources and Social Development was a cabinet position active from 2006 to 2008, designed to consolidate social and economic programs. Its responsibilities are now split between:

- the Minister of Employment, Workforce Development and Disability Inclusion
- the Minister of Families, Children and Social Development.
