= Morris Bodnar =

Canadian politician (1948–2026)

Morris Peter Bodnar (4 September 1948 – 16 January 2026) was a Canadian politician who was a member of the House of Commons of Canada at the Saskatoon—Dundurn electoral district from 1993 to 1997. Born in Saskatoon, Saskatchewan, Bodnar was a lawyer by career.

Bodnar won election to the 35th Canadian Parliament with the Liberal party in the 1993 federal election. He was defeated by Reform party candidate Allan Kerpan in the Blackstrap electoral district in the 1997 federal election. Bodnar was also unsuccessful in the 2000 federal election when he attempted to return to Parliament in the Saskatoon—Humboldt riding.

Bodnar died on 16 January 2026, at the age of 77.

== Sources ==
- Morris Bodnar – Parliament of Canada biography

Parliament of Canada
Preceded by Ron Fisher	Member of Parliament for Saskatoon—Dundurn; 1993–1997	Succeeded by The electoral district was abolished in 1996.
