= Saskatoon South (federal electoral district) =

Federal electoral district in Saskatchewan, Canada

Saskatchewan electoral district
- Interactive map of riding boundaries from the 2025 federal election

Federal electoral district
- Legislature: House of Commons
MP
Kevin Waugh
Conservative
- District created: 2013
- First contested: 2015
- Last contested: 2025
- District webpage: profile, map

Demographics
- Population (2021): 93,277
- Electors (2016): 66,219
- Area (km²): 342
- Pop. density (per km²): 272.7
- Census division: Division No. 11
- Census subdivision: Saskatoon (part)

Saskatoon South (French: Saskatoon-Sud; formerly Saskatoon—Grasswood) is a federal electoral district in Saskatchewan, Canada, that has been represented in the House of Commons of Canada since 2015. Most of it previously was in the Blackstrap riding (93%) with a small amount formerly in the Saskatoon—Humboldt (7%) riding, both in the city of Saskatoon.

Saskatoon—Grasswood was created by the 2012 federal electoral boundaries redistribution and was legally defined in the 2013 representation order. It came into effect upon the call of the 42nd Canadian federal election, on October 19, 2015.

Following the 2022 Canadian federal electoral redistribution, this riding was renamed Saskatoon South upon the calling of the 2025 Canadian federal election which was held on April 28, 2025. It lost all of its territory outside of the City of Saskatoon to Carlton Trail—Eagle Creek and lost the area north of 8th Street and west of Highway 11 to Saskatoon—University. It borders three other ridings, Carlton Trail—Eagle Creek to the south and east, Saskatoon East to the north, and Saskatoon West to the west.

== Demographics ==
Panethnic groups in Saskatoon—Grasswood (2011−2021)
Panethnic group	2021		2016		2011	
Panethnic group	Pop.	%	Pop.	%	Pop.	%
European (Note: Statistic includes all persons that did not make up part of a visible minority or an indigenous identity.)	62,955	68.9%	60,270	74.36%	59,260	83.52%
Indigenous	6,770	7.41%	6,155	7.59%	3,715	5.24%
South Asian	6,510	7.12%	4,375	5.4%	1,925	2.71%
East Asian (Note: Statistic includes total responses of "Chinese", "Korean", and "Japanese" under visible minority section on census.)	5,110	5.59%	4,015	4.95%	2,360	3.33%
Southeast Asian (Note: Statistic includes total responses of "Filipino" and "Southeast Asian" under visible minority section on census.)	3,400	3.72%	2,040	2.52%	1,165	1.64%
African	3,120	3.41%	1,850	2.28%	845	1.19%
Middle Eastern (Note: Statistic includes total responses of "West Asian" and "Arab" under visible minority section on census.)	1,980	2.17%	1,315	1.62%	915	1.29%
Latin American	720	0.79%	430	0.53%	305	0.43%
Other/multiracial (Note: Statistic includes total responses of "Visible minority, n.i.e." and "Multiple visible minorities" under visible minority section on census.)	815	0.89%	605	0.75%	460	0.65%
Total responses	91,375	97.96%	81,055	97.72%	70,955	98.53%
Total population	93,277	100%	82,946	100%	72,010	100%
Notes: Totals greater than 100% due to multiple origin responses. Demographics based on 2012 Canadian federal electoral redistribution riding boundaries.

== Members of Parliament ==
This riding has elected the following members of Parliament:

Parliament	Years	Member	Party
Saskatoon—Grasswood; Riding created from Blackstrap and Saskatoon—Humboldt
42nd	2015–2019	Kevin Waugh	Conservative
43rd	2019–2021	Kevin Waugh	Conservative
44th	2021–2025	Kevin Waugh	Conservative
Saskatoon South
45th	2025–present	Kevin Waugh	Conservative

== Election results ==
Graph of election results in Saskatoon—Grasswood (minor parties that never got 2% of the vote or didn't run consistently are omitted)

=== Saskatoon South, 2023 representation order ===
2025 Canadian federal election
** Preliminary results — Not yet official **
Party	Candidate	Votes	%	±%	Expenditures
Conservative	Kevin Waugh	24,516	49.29	+0.04	
Liberal	Rokhan Sarwar	20,107	40.43	+26.06	
New Democratic	Jacob Gadzella	4,498	9.04	–21.59	
Green	Hamish Graham	310	0.62	–0.61	
People's	Richard Brent Wintringham	308	0.62	–3.90	
Total valid votes/expense limit					
Total rejected ballots					
Turnout		49,739	71.97		
Eligible voters		69,109			
Conservative notional hold		Swing		–13.01	
Source: Elections Canada

2021 federal election redistributed results
Party	Vote	%
Conservative	21,423	49.25
New Democratic	13,322	30.63
Liberal	6,253	14.37
People's	1,965	4.52
Green	537	1.23

=== Saskatoon—Grasswood, 2013 representation order ===
2021 Canadian federal election: Saskatoon—Grasswood
Party	Candidate	Votes	%	±%	Expenditures
Conservative	Kevin Waugh	22,760	49.9	-3.4	$40,482.04
New Democratic	Kyla Kitzul	13,720	30.1	+4.5	$20,635.41
Liberal	Rokhan Sarwar	6,460	14.2	-2.8	$44,977.86
People's	Mark Friesen	2,108	4.6	+3.2	none listed
Green	Gillian Walker	556	1.2	-0.2	$131.25
Total valid votes/expense limit		45,604	100.0	–	$105,310.10
Total rejected ballots		303			
Turnout		45,907	68.71%		
Eligible voters		66,817			
Source: Elections Canada

2019 Canadian federal election: Saskatoon—Grasswood
Party	Candidate	Votes	%	±%	Expenditures
Conservative	Kevin Waugh	26,336	53.3	+11.7	$32,265.34
New Democratic	Erika Ritchie	12,672	25.6	-4.5	none listed
Liberal	Tracy Muggli	8,419	17.0	-9.4	$50,741.23
Green	Neil Sinclair	1,320	2.7	+0.9	$335.36
People's	Mark Friesen	692	1.4	-	none listed
Total valid votes/expense limit		49,439	100.0		
Total rejected ballots		337			
Turnout		49,776	77.6		
Eligible voters		64,150			
Conservative hold		Swing		+8.10	
Source: Global News, Elections Canada

2015 Canadian federal election: Saskatoon—Grasswood
Party	Candidate	Votes	%	±%	Expenditures
Conservative	Kevin Waugh	19,166	41.58	-8.64	$68,859.20
New Democratic	Scott Bell	13,909	30.18	-9.66	$103,289.43
Liberal	Tracy Muggli	12,165	26.4	+19.09	$63,065.97
Green	Mark Bigland-Pritchard	846	1.84	-0.65	$2,839.31
Total valid votes/expense limit		46,086	100.0		$194,681.77
Total rejected ballots		137	–	–	
Turnout		46,223	78.59	–	
Eligible voters		58,810			
Conservative hold		Swing		-9.13	
Source: Elections Canada

2011 federal election redistributed results
Party	Vote	%
Conservative	18,118	50.22
New Democratic	14,372	39.84
Liberal	2,641	7.32
Green	900	2.49
Independent	43	0.12

== See also ==
- List of Canadian electoral districts
- Historical federal electoral districts of Canada
