= Saskatoon—Dundurn =

Former federal electoral district in Saskatchewan, Canada

Saskatoon—Dundurn was a federal electoral district in Saskatchewan, Canada, that was represented in the House of Commons of Canada from 1988 to 1997. This riding was created in 1987 from parts of Humboldt—Lake Centre, Saskatoon East, and Saskatoon West ridings

It was abolished in 1996 when it was redistributed into Blackstrap and Saskatoon—Rosetown ridings.

== Members of Parliament ==
The following were the Members of Parliament for the riding:

1. Ron Fisher, New Democratic Party (1988–1993)
2. Morris Bodnar, Liberal (1993–1997)

== Election results ==
1988 Canadian federal election
Party	Candidate	Votes
New Democratic	FISHER, Ron	20,986
Progressive Conservative	BRYDEN, Grant	13,859
Liberal	FERGUSON, Debra	8,389
Confederation of Regions	KNUTSON, Elmer	384
Commonwealth of Canada	QUESNEL, Harold	51

1993 Canadian federal election
Party	Candidate	Votes
Liberal	BODNAR, Morris	14,707
New Democratic	FISHER, Ron	11,453
Reform	SCHENSTEAD, Eric Eugene	10,175
Progressive Conservative	BIRKMAIER, Donna L.	3,728
National	PINO, Kateri Hellman	785
Independent	KRIEGER, Al	302
Natural Law	LAFORGE, Léon	206
Canada Party	LLOYD, Bob	82
Not affiliated	STANTON, Colleen	62

== See also ==
- List of Canadian electoral districts
- Historical federal electoral districts of Canada
