= Cumberland Lake =

Lake in Saskatchewan, Canada

- Pine Island Lake
- Location in Saskatchewan Cumberland Lake (Canada)
- Location: Northern Administration District, Saskatchewan
- Coordinates: 54°03′N 102°18′W
- Type: Glacial lake
- Part of: Nelson River drainage basin
- Primary inflows: Saskatchewan River; Mossy Channel (branch of the Saskatchewan River); Sturgeon-Weir River
- River sources: Rocky Mountains
- Primary outflows: Saskatchewan River; Tearing River (flows into the Saskatchewan River)
- Basin countries: Canada
- Surface area: 24,562 ha (60,690 acres)
- Average depth: 1 m (3 ft)
- Max. depth: 4 m (13 ft)
- Shore length^{1}: 454 km (282 mi)
- Surface elevation: 262 m (860 ft)
- Settlements: Cumberland House
- ^{1} Shore length is not a well-defined measure.

Cumberland Lake (formally Pine Island Lake) is a glacial lake in the Canadian province of Saskatchewan. It is situated in the Saskatchewan River Delta in east-central Saskatchewan, about 60 kilometres (37 mi) from the Manitoba border. Cumberland House and Cumberland House Provincial Historic Park are on the south shore of the lake on Cumberland Island. Access to the lake and its amenities is from Highway 123 and Cumberland House Airport.

The area around Cumberland Lake has been inhabited by humans for over 7,000 years, is the site of the oldest permanent settlement in Saskatchewan, and was the interior hub for three canoe routes travelled by Voyageurs during the fur trade era. Lake (and delta) water levels have been dropping in recent years due to upstream damming, water usage, and water diversion.

== History ==
For over 7,000 years, Cumberland Lake and the surrounding delta has been inhabited by Indigenous peoples. In 1774, Samuel Hearne built the Hudson's Bay Company's first major inland trading post on Cumberland Island on the southern shore of the lake. This trading post is the oldest continuously inhabited settlement in Saskatchewan. The lake's location gave westward access for fur traders to the Saskatchewan River, north-west access to the Sturgeon-Weir River and the Churchill River system (and Lake Athabasca via the Methye Portage), and the Grass River, which lead north-east towards York Factory on Hudson Bay.

== Description ==
Cumberland lake is a large, shallow lake in the Saskatchewan River Delta — also known as the Cumberland Marshes. The delta, at almost 10,000 km^{2} (3,900 sq mi), is the largest inland delta in North America and Cumberland Lake, at 24,562 hectares (60,690 acres) in size, is the largest lake in the delta. The vast wetlands of the delta "contain some of the highest densities of breeding waterfowl in Saskatchewan" and, as such, are part of the Cumberland Marshes (SK 102) Important Bird Area of Canada. The southern portion of the lake is within this Important Bird Area.

The Saskatchewan River and several of its channels flow into the west end of the lake. The Sturgeon-Weir River, which has its source to the north at Corneille Lake, works its way into the lake through Namew Lake, Whitey Narrows, and Cross Lake. Cross Lake flows directly into the east end of Cumberland Lake. The main outflows include a channel that connects it back to the Saskatchewan River and Tearing River (which also connects back to the Saskatchewan River). It is bounded by Pine Island to the west and Spruce Island and Cumberland Island to the south.

== Lake water levels ==
Water levels in Cumberland Lake have been falling due to upstream damming and water usage. Several upstream dams have been constructed for reservoirs that provide water for consumption, irrigation, and hydroelectricity. Water is drawn from the Saskatchewan River and its tributaries thereby decreasing the overall flow that reaches the delta and the lake. The dams also reduce the amount of sediment that reaches the delta. This is changing the course of the Saskatchewan River and reducing the amount of water in the delta's channels, marshes, and lakes. The E.B. Campbell Hydroelectric Station upstream at Tobin Lake releases water based on electricity demand, which affects the natural flooding cycle of the delta. Before the damming of the river, the delta naturally flooded twice a year — once in the spring from local snow melt and once in the summer from snow melt in the Rocky Mountains. This disruption is problematic as it affects natural cycles and habitats of fish and animals. Reduced water flows into Cumberland Lake have reduced the lake's average depth to about 1 metre (3 ft) from 6.7 metres (22 ft). During the winter — which typically lasts five to six months — the lake, due to being shallow, "nearly freezes to the bottom, largely impacting fish populations".

There are concerns that the $4 billion future irrigation project that will draw water from Lake Diefenbaker will further cause water shortages in Cumberland Lake and the Saskatchewan River Delta. Patrick Boyle, a spokesman with the Saskatchewan Water Security Agency, responded, "We actually lose more [water] to evaporation [from Lake Diefenbaker], which is over three per cent, than we do to irrigation. We believe that there is significant supply there to satisfy all needs."

== Fish species ==
Fish commonly found in Cumberland Lake include walleye, sauger, yellow perch, northern pike, lake whitefish, goldeye, mooneye, white sucker, shorthead redhorse, longnose sucker, lake sturgeon, and burbot.

== See also ==
- List of lakes of Saskatchewan
