= Saskatchewan Highway 255 =

Provincial highway in Saskatchewan, Canada

Highway 255

Route information
- Maintained by Ministry of Highways and Infrastructure
- Length: 22.8 km (14.2 mi)

Major junctions
- South end: Highway 55 near Nipawin
- North end: Tobin Lake

Location
- Country: Canada
- Province: Saskatchewan
- Rural municipalities: Nipawin, Moose Range

Highway system
- Provincial highways in Saskatchewan
← Highway 247	→ Highway 263

Highway 255 is a provincial highway in the Canadian province of Saskatchewan. Saskatchewan's 200-series highways primarily service its recreational areas. The highway runs from Highway 55 to the resort village of Tobin Lake. It is about 23 kilometres (14 mi) long.

Highway 255 runs along Range Road 2133, Township Road 520, and Range Road 2130.

== Route description ==
Hwy 255 begins in the Rural Municipality of Nipawin No. 487 at an intersection with Hwy 55 (Northern Woods and Water Route) nearly halfway between the town of Nipawin and the hamlet of Blue Jay. It heads north along Range Road 2133 to cross the Petaigan River via a causeway and travel through rural farmland for a few kilometres, passing by the Rolling Pines Golf Course and an RV park before curving eastward onto Township Road 520 near the Gingara Subsivision. After travelling due east through rural areas for a few kilometres, the highway makes a sudden sharp left onto Range Road 2130 as it crosses into the Rural Municipality of Moose Range No. 486, with Township Road 520 continuing east towards Hwy 123, Petaigan, and Cumberland House. Hwy 255 begins running parallel to the southern coastline of Tobin Lake, heading northeast past several lakeside resorts and campgrounds to enter the resort village of Tobin Lake, travelling through neighbourhoods before coming to an end at a boat launch in the centre of town. The entire length of Hwy 255 is a paved, two-lane highway.

== Major intersections ==
Rural municipality	Location	km	mi	Destinations	Notes
Nipawin No. 487		0.0	0.0	Highway 55 (NWWR) – Carrot River, Nipawin	Southern terminus
Nipawin No. 487		0.5– 0.9	0.31– 0.56	Causeway across the Petaigan River	
Nipawin No. 487		9.8	6.1	Gingara Road (Township Road 520 / Range Road 2133) – Gingara Subdivision	
Nipawin No. 487 / Moose Range No. 486 boundary		14.4	8.9	Township Road 520 to Highway 123 – Cumberland House	Hwy 255 makes a sharp left turn
Moose Range No. 486	Tobin Lake	22.8	14.2	Boat launch on Tobin Lake	Dead end; northern terminus
1.000 mi = 1.609 km; 1.000 km = 0.621 mi

== See also ==
- Transportation in Saskatchewan
- Roads in Saskatchewan
