= Saskatchewan Highway 123 =

Provincial highway in Saskatchewan, Canada

Highway 123

Route information
- Maintained by Ministry of Highways and Infrastructure
- Length: 137.1 km (85.2 mi)
- Existed: 1963–present

Major junctions
- South end: Highway 55 near Carrot River
- North end: Cumberland House

Location
- Country: Canada
- Province: Saskatchewan
- Rural municipalities: Moose Range

Highway system
- Provincial highways in Saskatchewan
← Highway 120	→ Highway 135

Highway 123 is a provincial highway in the Canadian province of Saskatchewan. It runs from Highway 55, 600 metres (2,000 ft) east of its intersection with Highway 23, to Cumberland House on Cumberland Island. It is about 137 kilometres (85 mi) long.

Highway 123 runs along the south-eastern shore of Tobin Lake and follows the Saskatchewan River downstream from the E.B. Campbell Dam to Cumberland Island. It provides access to the communities of Petaigan, Ravendale, Pemmican Portage, and Cumberland House. Parks accessed from the highway include Cumberland House Provincial Park, Dragline Channel Recreation Site, D. Gerbrandt Recreation Site (Thunder Rapids Lodge), and Bigstone Cutoff Recreation Site.

On 24 May 2024, the road was washed out and so the community of Cumberland House declared a state of emergency.

== Major intersections ==
From south to north:

Rural municipality	Location	km	mi	Destinations	Notes
Moose Range No. 486		0.0	0.0	Highway 55 (NWWR) – The Pas, Nipawin; To Highway 23 south – Carrot River	Southern terminus; southern end of paved section
Moose Range No. 486	Petaigan	9.9	6.2	Township Road 520 – Tobin Lake	
Moose Range No. 486	D. Gerbrandt Recreation Site	41.7	25.9	E.B. Campbell Hydroelectric Station access road	Access road to dam
Moose Range No. 486	D. Gerbrandt Recreation Site	42.4	26.3	Northern end of paved section	
Northern Saskatchewan Administration District		63.5	39.5	Bridge over the Sipanok Channel	
Northern Saskatchewan Administration District	Dragline Channel Recreation Site	80.4	50.0	Bridge over the Dragline Channel	
Northern Saskatchewan Administration District	Cumberland House	133.2– 133.5	82.8– 83.0	Cumberland House Bridge over the Saskatchewan River	
Northern Saskatchewan Administration District	Cumberland House	134.2	83.4	Reserve Road – Cumberland House Cree Nation	
Northern Saskatchewan Administration District	Cumberland House	135.9	84.4	Reserve Road – Cumberland House Cree Nation	
Northern Saskatchewan Administration District	Cumberland House	137.1	85.2	Cumberland Street / Industrial Drive	End of provincial maintenance; northern terminus
1.000 mi = 1.609 km; 1.000 km = 0.621 mi

== See also ==
- Transportation in Saskatchewan
- Roads in Saskatchewan
