= Saskatchewan Highway 55 =

Provincial highway in Saskatchewan, Canada

Highway 55
- Northern Woods and Water Route
- Highway 55 highlighted in red

Route information
- Maintained by Saskatchewan Ministry of Highways and Infrastructure
- Length: 685 km (426 mi)

Major junctions
- West end: Highway 55 at Alberta border
- Highway 21 at Pierceland; Highway 26 near Goodsoil; Highway 4 at Meadow Lake; Highway 155 at Green Lake; Highway 3 from Shellbrook to Prince Albert; Highway 2 / CanAm Highway in Prince Albert; Highway 106 at Smeaton; Highway 6 at Choiceland; Highway 35 at Nipawin; Highway 23 north of Carrot River; Highway 9 east of Mountain Cabin
- East end: PR 283 at Manitoba border

Location
- Country: Canada
- Province: Saskatchewan
- Rural municipalities: Beaver River RM, Meadow Lake RM, Northern Administration District, Big River RM, Canwood RM, Shellbrook RM, Buckland RM, Garden River RM, Paddockwood RM, Torch River RM, Nipawin RM, Moose Range RM, Hudson Bay RM
- Major cities: Prince Albert

Highway system
- Provincial highways in Saskatchewan
← Highway 54	→ Highway 56

Highway 55 is a paved, undivided provincial highway in Saskatchewan, Canada. It runs from the Alberta border west of Pierceland (where it continues as Alberta Highway 55) to Manitoba Provincial Road 283 west of The Pas, Manitoba. Highway 55 is about 685 kilometres (426 mi) long and forms part of the interprovincial Northern Woods and Water Route.

== Attractions ==
Several parks and points of interest are accessed from Highway 55. Some of these include:

- Meadow Lake Provincial Park is a large provincial park accessed from several roads off Highway 55.
- Saint Cyr Hills Trails Recreation Site is a recreational park with year-round hiking, biking, snowshoeing, and cross-country skiing. Access is from Island Hill Rd, 3 kilometres (1.9 mi) from Highway 55.
- Nipawin & District Regional Park is park on the north side of Nipawin along the banks of the Saskatchewan River.
- Nipawin Bridge, located on Highway 55, is Saskatchewan's longest bridge.
- Wildcat Hill Provincial Park is a provincial park just south of the eastern end of the highway. The park is only accessible by ATV or snowmobile.
- Mountain Cabin Recreation Site is just south of the junction with Highway 9 along Highway 9.
- Rice River Canyon is a "rugged backcountry wilderness hike" up Rice River Canyon into the Pasquia Hills.
- Pasquia Hills North Recreation Site is a campground along Highway 55.
- Cowan Dam Recreation Site is a campground at Cowan Lake Dam.
- Big River Regional Park is in the town of Big River.

== Highway upgrades and improvements ==
In the autumn of 2025, the Highway 55 bridge over the Green River was replaced. Paving was completed in the spring of 2026. The bridge is west of the community of Green Lake and north of the lake of the same name. The project cost $9.2 million.

== Major intersections ==
From west to east:

Rural municipality	Location	km	mi	Destinations	Notes
Beaver River No. 622		0.0	0.0	Highway 55 west (NWWR) – Cold Lake, Edmonton	Continuation into Alberta
Beaver River No. 622	Pierceland	15.6	9.7	Highway 21 – Paradise Hill, Meadow Lake Provincial Park	
Beaver River No. 622	Peerless	51.9	32.2	Highway 26 north – Goodsoil, Meadow Lake Provincial Park	West end of Highway 26 concurrency
Beaver River No. 622		53.3	33.1	Highway 26 south – Loon Lake, St. Walburg	East end of Highway 26 concurrency
Beaver River No. 622–Meadow Lake No. 588 boundary		71.2	44.2	Crosses the Beaver River	
Meadow Lake No. 588		89.0	55.3	Highway 699 south – Loon Lake	
Meadow Lake No. 588		111.0	69.0	Highway 4 north – Meadow Lake Provincial Park	West end of Highway 4 concurrency
City of Meadow Lake		120.9	75.1	Highway 4 south – Glaslyn, The Battlefords	East end of Highway 4 concurrency
Meadow Lake No. 588		132.1	82.1	Highway 903 north – Canoe Narrows	
Meadow Lake No. 588		140.1	87.1	Highway 698 south	
Northern Saskatchewan Administration District	Green Lake	170.3	105.8	Highway 155 north – Beauval, Buffalo Narrows, La Loche	Passes through Green Lake
Northern Saskatchewan Administration District		198.2	123.2	Highway 924 north – Sled Lake	
Big River No. 555	Big River	246.5	153.2		Passes through Big River
Big River No. 555		254.5	158.1	Highway 942 north	
Big River No. 555		255.6	158.8	Highway 922 north	
Canwood No. 494	Debden	284.6	176.8	Highway 793 west – Leoville	
Canwood No. 494		309.8	192.5	Highway 790 west	
Canwood No. 494	Canwood	310.3	192.8	Highway 694 south	
Shellbrook No. 493		329.0	204.4	Highway 240 north – Prince Albert National Park	
Shellbrook No. 493	Shellbrook	334.0	207.5	Highway 3 west to Highway 40 west – Spiritwood, The Battlefords	West end of Highway 3 concurrency
Shellbrook No. 493	Holbein	346.7	215.4	Highway 693 north – Sturgeon Valley	
Buckland No. 491	No major junctions				
City of Prince Albert		376.2	233.8	Highway 2 / Highway 3 east / CanAm Highway – Prince Albert National Park, La Ronge, Melfort, Saskatoon	Interchange; east end of Highway 3 concurrency
City of Prince Albert		377.0	234.3	Riverside Drive	Westbound access to Highway 2 south / Highway 3 east
Buckland No. 491		393.6	244.6	Pulp Haul Road	
Garden River No. 490		395.9	246.0	Highway 780 east	West end of Highway 780 concurrency
Garden River No. 490		399.9	248.5	Highway 780 west	East end of Highway 780 concurrency
Garden River No. 490	Meath Park	417.2	259.2	Highway 355 west – Spruce Home	
Garden River No. 490	Meath Park	418.3	259.9	Highway 120 north – Candle Lake, Creighton	
Garden River No. 490	Weirdale	424.9	264.0	Range Road 2230	
Torch River No. 488	Smeaton	454.7	282.5	Highway 106 north (Hanson Lake Road) – Creighton, Flin Flon	
Torch River No. 488	Snowden	464.4	288.6	Highway 691 north	
Torch River No. 488	Choiceland	475.9	295.7	Highway 6 south – Melfort, Regina Highway 692 north	
Torch River No. 488	White Fox	505.0	313.8	Highway 35 north – Tobin Lake (west/north shores)	West end of Highway 35 concurrency
Torch River No. 488–Nipawin No. 487 boundary		512.8	318.6	Nipawin Bridge across the Saskatchewan River	
Nipawin No. 487	Nipawin	516.9	321.2	Highway 35 south (1st Avenue E) / Nipawin Road – Tisdale	East end of Highway 35 concurrency
Nipawin No. 487		527.8	328.0	Highway 255 north – Tobin Lake	
Moose Range No. 486		545.1	338.7	Highway 23 south – Carrot River, Porcupine Plain	
Moose Range No. 486		545.7	339.1	Highway 123 north – Cumberland House	
Moose Range No. 486		572.6	355.8	Highway 690 south	
Northern Saskatchewan Administration District		589.1	366.0	Red Earth Access Road – Red Earth First Nation	
Northern Saskatchewan Administration District		611.9	380.2	Pakwaw Lake Access Road – Shoal Lake First Nation	
Northern Saskatchewan Administration District		650.1	404.0	Highway 9 south (Saskota Flyway) – Hudson Bay	West end of Highway 9 concurrency
Northern Saskatchewan Administration District		685.0	425.6	PR 283 east (NWWR) – The Pas	Continuation into Manitoba; east end of Highway 9 concurrency
1.000 mi = 1.609 km; 1.000 km = 0.621 mi: Concurrency terminus; Route transition

== See also ==
- Transportation in Saskatchewan
- Roads in Saskatchewan
