= Rural Municipality of Nipawin No. 487 =

Rural municipality in Saskatchewan, Canada

Nipawin No. 487
- Rural municipality
- Rural Municipality of Nipawin No. 487
- Location of the RM of Nipawin No. 487 in Saskatchewan
- Coordinates: 53.363°N 104.063°W
- Country: Canada
- Province: Saskatchewan
- Census division: 14
- SARM division: 4
- Formed: December 9, 1912

Government
  - Reeve: Dona Hoppe
  - Governing body: RM of Nipawin No. 487 Council
  - Administrator: Nathalie Hipkins
  - Office location: Codette

Area (2016)
  - Land: 886.04 km^{2} (342.10 sq mi)

Population (2016)
  - Total: 1,004
  - Density: 1.1/km^{2} (2.8/sq mi)
- Time zone: CST
  - Summer (DST): CST
- Area codes: 306 and 639
- Website: Official website

The Rural Municipality of Nipawin No. 487 (2016 population: 1,004) is a rural municipality (RM) in the Canadian province of Saskatchewan within Census Division No. 14 and SARM Division No. 4.

== History ==
The RM of Nipawin No. 487 incorporated as a rural municipality on December 9, 1912.

== Geography ==
=== Communities and localities ===
The following urban municipalities are surrounded by the RM.

Towns

- Nipawin

Villages

- Aylsham
- Codette

The following unincorporated communities are within the RM.

Localities

- Carlea
- Elk Hill
- Inkster
- Klemmer
- Lost River
- Pontrilas

== Demographics ==
Population history (1981–2016)
Year	Pop.	±%
1981	1,429	—
1986	1,570	+9.9%
1991	1,389	−11.5%
1996	1,269	−8.6%
2001	1,274	+0.4%
2006	1,166	−8.5%
2011	1,030	−11.7%
2016	1,004	−2.5%
Source: Statistics Canada via Saskatchewan Bureau of Statistics

In the 2021 Census of Population conducted by Statistics Canada, the RM of Nipawin No. 487 had a population of 958 living in 391 of its 467 total private dwellings, a change of −4.6% from its 2016 population of 1,004. With a land area of 879.63 km^{2} (339.63 sq mi), it had a population density of 1.1/km^{2} (2.8/sq mi) in 2021.

In the 2016 Census of Population, the RM of Nipawin No. 487 recorded a population of 1,004 living in 401 of its 440 total private dwellings, a −2.5% change from its 2011 population of 1,030. With a land area of 886.04 km^{2} (342.10 sq mi), it had a population density of 1.1/km^{2} (2.9/sq mi) in 2016.

== Parks and recreation ==
Museums

- Nipawin & District Living Forestry Museum

Wildlife sanctuaries

- Maurice Street Provincial Protected Area

Regional parks

- Wapiti Valley Regional Park.
- Nipawin & District Regional Park (53.3847°N 104.0083°W) is a recreational park in a boreal forest of birch, jack pine, and tamarack about 2.5 kilometres (1.6 mi) north of the town of Nipawin. It is situated along the banks of the Saskatchewan River, just upstream from Tobin Lake. The park, which was designated a regional park in 1965 and opened in 1968, consists of over 300 acres of land, a campground, cabin rentals, river access, and a golf course. Access is from Highway 55.

Accommodations at the park include a campground that has over 180 serviced campsites with showers and washrooms, houseboats, and cabins. There is also a chalet that can be rented for events. Other amenities at the park include a picnic area, petting zoo, kids' playground, spray park, 18-hole mini golf, boat rentals, boat launches, horseshoe pits, a basket ball and pickleball court, and hiking trails. In the winter, there are many kilometres of groomed cross-country skiing trails.

Golf courses

- The Evergreen Golf and Country Club is an 18-hole golf course that was built in 1957. It has grass greens, 6,539 yards, and is a par 72. It was once touted as one of the top one hundred courses in Canada and has won awards for Best Overall Value, Top Hidden Gem, and Top 3 Best Conditioned Greens. Amenities at the course include a licensed clubhouse, pro shop, rentals, dining, and a patio.

== Government ==
The RM of Nipawin No. 487 is governed by an elected municipal council and an appointed administrator that meets on the second Tuesday of every month. The reeve of the RM is Dona Hoppe while its administrator is Nathalie Hipkins. The RM's office is located in Codette.

== Infrastructure ==
The RM is home to the Nipawin Hydroelectric Station.

=== Transportation ===
- Highway 6
- Highway 35
- Highway 55
- Highway 255
- Highway 691
- Highway 789
- Crooked Bridge
- Canadian National Railway
- Nipawin Airport

== See also ==
- List of rural municipalities in Saskatchewan
