= Gerald M. Morin =

Cree judge (born 1953/1954)

The Honourable Gerald M. Morin OC KC

Provincial Court of Saskatchewan Judge
- In office January 24, 2001 – February 2019

Cree Court Judge
- In office October 2001 – February 2019 (Note: He has been continuing his judicial duties despite retiring in February 2019.)
- Preceded by: Position established
- Succeeded by: Mary McAuley

Territorial Court of the Northwest Territories Deputy Judge
- In office 2006 or 2008 – February 2019

Territorial Court of Yukon Deputy Judge
- In office 2016 – February 2019

Personal details
- Born: 1953 or 1954 (age 72–73) Cumberland House, Saskatchewan, Canada
- Children: 1
- Education: Kelsey Institute of Applied Arts and Sciences; University of Regina; University of Saskatchewan

Gerald "Gerry" M. Morin OC KC (born 1953 or 1954 in Cumberland House, Saskatchewan) is a Canadian judge. He is a member of the Peter Ballantyne Cree Nation.

== Early life and education ==
Morin was born in 1953 or 1954 in Cumberland House, Saskatchewan. He attended Charlebois School in Cumberland House until grade 10, then completed high school at L.P. Miller Comprehensive School in Nipawin, Saskatchewan, in 1971.

He obtained a certificate in social work from Saskatchewan Polytechnic (then the Kelsey Institute of Applied Arts and Sciences) in 1973. He obtained another certificate in social work in 1978 from the University of Regina, and in 1979 earned a Bachelor of Social Work from the same institution. He enrolled at the University of Saskatchewan in 1984 and graduated with a Bachelor of Laws and Juris Doctor in 1987.

== Career ==
Morin started working as a probation officer in 1973. He was an assistant professor at the University of Manitoba School of Social Work, where he taught community development, and where he served as the Director of the Indian Child and Family Services Training Program from 1982 to 1984. After graduating from law school in 1987, he practised law in Prince Albert, Saskatchewan and he was a sessional instructor at the Gabriel Dumont Institute's Native Justice Program. He has served as a member and president of the board of the Prince Albert Indian and Métis Friendship Centre. In 1999, he was the first Indigenous person in Saskatchewan's history to receive a Queen's Counsel designation.

On January 24, 2001, he was the first Cree-speaking person to be appointed as a judge to the Provincial Court of Saskatchewan for Prince Albert, where he helped set up the Cree Court Circuit. As a judge, he sat in Indigenous communities such as Pelican Narrows, Sandy Bay First Nation, Whitefish Lake First Nation, and Ahtahkakoop Cree Nation, at times addressing defendants in Cree. In 2012, he initiated the Wunusweh Centennial Lecture in Aboriginal Law, (Note: In Cree, Wunusweh means 'to make things right' or 'to make law'.) an annual lecture series at the University of Saskatchewan's College of Law.

He has also served as a Deputy Judge in the Territorial Court of the Northwest Territories (appointed in 2006 or 2008) and the Territorial Court of Yukon (appointed in 2016).

He retired in 2019, but continues his judicial duties in all three jurisdictions.

In December 2022, he was appointed as an Officer of the Order of Canada, "[f]or his groundbreaking contributions to the Cree Court Circuit, and for his mentorship of the next generation of lawyers and judges."

== Personal life ==
Morin speaks three dialects of Cree. He enjoys golf, cross-country skiing, and fishing, and has served as a member of the board of directors for the Prince Albert Raiders. He has one son.
