= Codette Lake =

Reservoir in Saskatchewan, Canada

- Location in Saskatchewan Codette Lake (Canada)
- Location: Saskatchewan
- Coordinates: 53.2538°N 104.4649°W
- Type: Reservoir
- Part of: Saskatchewan River drainage basin
- Primary inflows: Saskatchewan River
- Primary outflows: Saskatchewan River
- Basin countries: Canada
- Max. length: 35 km (22 mi)
- Surface area: 4,615.5 ha (11,405 acres)
- Max. depth: 38.1 m (125 ft)
- Shore length^{1}: 224.2 km (139.3 mi)
- Surface elevation: 340 m (1,120 ft)
- Islands: Thomson Island
- ^{1} Shore length is not a well-defined measure.

Codette Lake, which was named after Métis fur trader Baptiste Codette, is a reservoir in the Canadian province of Saskatchewan. The lake was impounded in 1986 with the construction of the Francois-Finlay Dam across the Saskatchewan River about 5 kilometres (3.1 mi) upstream from the town of Nipawin. The dam is the site of the Nipawin Hydroelectric Station. Downstream from Codette Lake is Tobin Lake, which is another man-made lake along the course of the Saskatchewan River. It was created in 1963 with the construction of the E.B. Campbell Dam.

The creation of Codette Lake submerged Bushfield Flats, which was an important site for First Nations and an historic trading post. The lake's northern shoreline is in the RM of Torch River No. 488 while the southern shore is in the RM of Nipawin No. 487.

== Bushfield Flats ==
The Bushfield Flats, which were submerged under Codette Lake when the dam was built, was an important site for local Indians and the site of the trading post built by James Finaly and Francois LeBlanc in 1768. The Francois-Finlay Dam was named after the pair. The flats were directly upstream from the current site of the dam on a peninsula that jutted out into the Saskatchewan River. These flats were the original "meeting place" for the town of Nipawin's namesake. The flats were named after William Bushfield, a local farmer. Prior to the flooding of the lake in 1986, there were two archaeological digs there. The West Site had a pre-historic Cree encampment while the East Site showed evidence "that the area had been an important Indian stopover for centuries". Bushfield's Landing — a marina located on the lake's southern shore — is near the original site.

== Recreation ==
Wapiti Valley Regional Park straddles the lake near the western end. The park has downhill and cross-country skiing in the winter and camping in the summer. The park is accessed from Highways 6 and 789.

About 5 kilometres (3.1 mi) south of Nipawin along Highway 35 is Francois Finlay Hydroelectric Dam Vista Viewpoint. The viewpoint is on a plateau and has views of Codette Lake, the dam and power station, and the gorge.

On the southern shore of the lake, about 11.5 kilometres (7.1 mi) west of Codette, is Smit's Campground and Blue Winds Fish n' Tours. Access is from Highway 789.

== Fish species ==
Fish commonly found in Codette Lake include walleye, northern pike, burbot, yellow perch, white sucker, goldeye, Lake sturgeon, sauger, and white sturgeon.

== See also ==
- List of lakes of Saskatchewan
- Saskatchewan River fur trade
- Tourism in Saskatchewan
