= Codette =

Village in Saskatchewan, Canada

- Village
- Village of Codette
- Location of Codette in Saskatchewan Codette (Canada)
- Coordinates: 53.164407°N 104.013320°W
- Country: Canada
- Province: Saskatchewan
- Region: East-central
- Census division: 14
- Rural municipality: Nipawin No. 487

Government
  - Type: Municipal
  - Governing body: Codette Village Council
  - Mayor: Kyle Kotelko
  - Administrator: Vacant

Area
  - Land: 0.37 km^{2} (0.14 sq mi)

Population (2016)
  - Total: 198
  - Density: 539.2/km^{2} (1,397/sq mi)
- Time zone: UTC-6 (CST)
- Postal code: S0E 0P0
- Area code: 306
- Highways: Highway 35 Highway 789

Codette (2016 population: 198) is a village in the Canadian province of Saskatchewan within the Rural Municipality of Nipawin No. 487 and Census Division No. 14. The village is located 10 kilometres (6.2 mi) south of Nipawin at the junction of Highway 35 and Highway 789.

== History ==
Codette incorporated as a village on March 9, 1929. The community shares its name with nearby Codette Lake, a reservoir on the Saskatchewan River, impounded by the Francois Finlay Dam.

== Demographics ==
Population history (1981–2016)
Year	Pop.	±%
1981	236	—
1986	270	+14.4%
1991	293	+8.5%
1996	278	−5.1%
2001	237	−14.7%
2006	221	−6.8%
2011	205	−7.2%
2016	198	−3.4%
Source: Statistics Canada via Saskatchewan Bureau of Statistics

In the 2021 Census of Population conducted by Statistics Canada, Codette had a population of 180 living in 95 of its 105 total private dwellings, a change of −9.1% from its 2016 population of 198. With a land area of 0.41 km^{2} (0.16 sq mi), it had a population density of 439.0/km^{2} (1,137.1/sq mi) in 2021.

In the 2016 Census of Population, the Village of Codette recorded a population of 198 living in 103 of its 105 total private dwellings, a −3.5% change from its 2011 population of 205. With a land area of 0.37 km^{2} (0.14 sq mi), it had a population density of 535.1/km^{2} (1,386.0/sq mi) in 2016.

== See also ==
- List of communities in Saskatchewan
- List of villages in Saskatchewan
