= Elk Hill =

Elk Hill may refer to:

- Elk Hill (Forest, Virginia), listed on the National Register of Historic Places in Bedford County, Virginia
- Elk Hill (Goochland, Virginia), listed on the National Register of Historic Places in Goochland County, Virginia
- Elk Hill (Nellysford, Virginia), listed on the National Register of Historic Places in Nelson County, Virginia
- Elk Hill (Pennsylvania), a mountain in Herrick Township, Susquehanna County
- Elk Hill, Saskatchewan, hamlet in Saskatchewan
