= Pontrilas, Saskatchewan =

Ghost town in Saskatchewan, Canada

Coordinates: 53°13′00″N 104°02′02″W

Location of Pontrilas in Saskatchewan

Pontrilas was a town in the Canadian province of Saskatchewan that no longer exists. At one time Pontrilas was a small farming community approximately 10 miles (16.1 km) south of Nipawin. Access is from Highway 35.

At one time, there were four grain elevators, small stores, and other services. Around the centre were homes and a two-room school for grades 1 to 12. When the school closed, the students were sent to Codette and Nipawin; the school's merry-go-round was sent to Codette. There was a hotel, which burnt down. The community was named for Pontrilas in Herefordshire, near the border with Wales.

== See also ==
- List of ghost towns in Saskatchewan
- List of communities in Saskatchewan
