= Carlea =

Carlea may refer to:

- Carlea, Saskatchewan, a former railway station and hamlet in Canada
- Carlea, a taxonomic synonym of the plant genus Symplocos
