= Saskatchewan River Sturgeon Management Board =

(SRSMB)
- Founded: 1998, Saskatchewan, Canada
- Purpose: Sturgeon Recovery
- Region served: Saskatchewan River
- Method: Research
- Website: saskriversturgeon.ca

The Saskatchewan River Sturgeon Management Board (SRSMB) advises the governments of Canada, Manitoba, Saskatchewan and First Nations on all matters related to sturgeon management on the Saskatchewan River between the Grand Rapids and E.B. Campbell dams.

== Scope ==
SRSMB members represent provincial and federal agencies, commercial fishermen and local Cree Nations with a common objective:

To prevent further decline of the sturgeon population; and to develop and coordinate a recovery plan.

The Board may make recommendations on the following matters:

- Provincial harvest levels (sport, commercial, and domestic)
- Aboriginal domestic harvest
- Population monitoring
- Habitat assessment and enhancement
- Fish culture activities
- Community education
- Water Management with respect to sturgeon requirements
- Research

== Lake sturgeon overview ==
Lake sturgeon have always been an important resource for people living along the lower Saskatchewan River. Sturgeon not only provide a traditional food source, but also supported a commercial fishery for over 110 years.

Over-harvesting and habitat changes (resulting from municipal and industrial water use, irrigation and hydroelectric development) have caused a drastic reduction in the sturgeon population in the lower Saskatchewan River during the latter half of the 20th century.

The SRSMB was formed to prevent further population decline and work towards recovery

=== Habitat impact ===
Natural Changes

Occasionally waterways change their course and the new channel may or may not be as suitable for sturgeon as the previous channel.

Human Developments

In the past little consideration was given to the effects of developments on fish and their habitat. This is changing and efforts are being made to minimize impacts of new and existing development.

- Municipal and Industrial Water Use

Municipal and industrial water use can impact sturgeon by changing the amount of water available, the water temperature and water quality.

- Irrigation and Agriculture

Withdrawing irrigation water from creeks and rivers can reduce and degrade fish habitat. Agricultural practices can also degrade riverbanks and cause erosion. Erosion increases the amount of sediment in the water and can affect fish survival.

- Hydroelectric Development and other Dams

Dams create barriers to upstream movement, can change flow patterns and can damage and destroy habitat, making it less suitable for sturgeon

=== Sturgeon recovery ===
The number of sturgeon in the SRSMB area is much lower now than historically. This has been due primarily to a combination of habitat loss and historical over-harvest. The population is no longer large enough to support a commercial fishery and, if it declines further, may soon fail to support the traditional uses of local Aboriginal people.

A recovery program can stop the population decline by:

- Decreasing mortality (the number of fish that die) by voluntarily reducing harvest.
- Increasing recruitment (the number of new fish each year) by stocking and by allowing the number of spawners to increase through voluntarily reducing harvest.
- Protecting and enhancing habitat, such as the quantity and quality of water.

The SRSMB is undertaking a recovery program consisting of several components including:

- population monitoring
- population enhancement
- habitat assessment
- habitat use studies
- public education.

== Members ==
The Saskatchewan River Sturgeon Management Board is made up of members representing the following organizations:

- Cumberland House Cree Nation
- Cumberland House Fishermen's Co-op
- Fisheries and Oceans Canada
- Manitoba Water Stewardship, Fisheries Branch
- Manitoba Hydro
- Opaskwayak Cree Nation
- Opaskwayak Commercial Fishermen's Co-op
- Saskatchewan Northern Affairs
- SaskPower
- Saskatchewan Watershed Authority
- Saskatchewan Environment

== See also ==
- Sturgeon
- Lake Sturgeon
