= Crooked Bridge =

Old Nipawin Bridge
- Coordinates: 53°21′56.3″N 104°02′26.1″W
- Carries: Torch River Rail Inc.
- Crosses: Saskatchewan River
- Locale: Nipawin No. 487 / Torch River No. 488, near Nipawin, Saskatchewan, Canada
- Official name: Old Nipawin Bridge
- Maintained by: Torch River Rail Inc.

Characteristics
- Design: Girder bridge
- Total length: 581 m (1,906 ft)

History
- Construction start: September 1928
- Construction end: April, 1930

Location
- Interactive map of Old Nipawin Bridge

The Old Nipawin Bridge is a railway bridge that spans the Saskatchewan River just north of Nipawin, Saskatchewan. It was originally built by the Canadian Pacific Railway. The 'Old Bridge' is a double-deck bridge with the top deck carrying the Torch River Railway (short-line operator) track while a now-disused 16-foot-wide (4.9 m) roadway is on the lower deck. Because of the narrow roadway, traffic was controlled by traffic signals at either end. On June 16, 2021, Saskatchewan Ministry of Highways closed the road portion of the bridge due to rapidly deteriorating conditions; however, as of August 2021 the railway portion of the bridge remains active.

== See also ==
- List of bridges in Canada
- List of road–rail bridges
