= Cumberland Island (Saskatchewan) =

Island in Saskatchewan, Canada

- Location in Saskatchewan Cumberland Island (Saskatchewan) (Canada)

Geography
- Location: Saskatchewan River Delta
- Coordinates: 53.9167°N 102.2004°W
- Adjacent to: Cumberland Lake
- Highest elevation: 272 m (892 ft)

Administration
- Canada
- Province: Saskatchewan
- Rural municipality: Northern Administration District

Cumberland Island, also known as Pine Island, is a small island in the Saskatchewan River Delta in the east-central region of the Canadian province of Saskatchewan. The Saskatchewan River Delta is one of the largest active inland deltas in North America. Cumberland Island is situated between Cumberland Lake to the north and the Saskatchewan River to the south. The Tearing River runs along the eastern edge of the island and Bigstone River along the western edge. The Bigstone River separates Cumberland Island from Spruce Island to the west. The island is in the Mid-Boreal Lowland region, which consists of mixed coniferous and deciduous forests of white and black spruce, jack pine, tamarack, trembling aspen, balsam poplar, and balsam fir.

Cumberland Island's location was important to the fur trade as it sat on the canoe route that brought furs from the west to the Hudson Bay. In 1774, the Hudson's Bay Company had set up its first inland factory on the island.

== Communities ==
Cumberland Island is in the Northern Saskatchewan Administration District and is home to the villages of Cumberland House (Saskatchewan's oldest continuously inhabited community) and Pemmican Portage. Adjacent to the communities are Cumberland House Provincial Park, which is the site of the former Hudson's Bay Company fort, and Cumberland House Indian reserve. Métis and Swampy Cree make up most of the 1,500 residents on the island. Access to the island is from Highway 123 and the Cumberland House Airport. The airport is located west of Cumberland House and Highway 123 accesses the island from the south side across the Cumberland House Bridge, which was built in 1995.

== Bigstone Cutoff Recreation Site ==
Bigstone Cutoff Recreation Site (53.9311°N 102.3436°W) is a provincial recreation site located at the westernmost point of Cumberland Island, at the confluence of Bigstone River and the Bigstone Cutoff arm of the Saskatchewan River. The park has a small, free campground and access to the river for boating and fishing.

== See also ==
- List of islands of Saskatchewan
- Saskatchewan River fur trade
- List of Hudson's Bay Company trading posts
