= Wapiti Valley Regional Park =

Ski resort in Saskatchewan, Canada

- Location within Saskatchewan Location within Canada
- Location: RM of Nipawin No. 487, Saskatchewan, Canada
- Nearest city: Melfort
- Coordinates: 53.2334°N 104.4588°W
- Vertical: 90 m (300 ft)
- Skiable area: 10 ha (25 acres)
- Trails: 15
- Lift system: 1 quad chair; 1 surface lift
- Terrain parks: yes
- Snowfall: 51 cm (20 in)
- Snowmaking: 95%
- Website: Ski Wapiti

Wapiti Valley Regional Park is a ski resort and regional park in the Canadian province of Saskatchewan. It is in the Saskatchewan River Valley on the shores of Codette Lake in the rural municipalities of Nipawin No. 487 and Torch River No. 488 on the edge of the Fort à la Corne Provincial Forest. The park, which opened in 1984, is a ski resort in the winter and a campground in the summer. Access is from Highway 6.

The ski resort has 15 different runs totalling about 6 km (3.7 mi) of trails. There are two lifts—the quad chair "Wapiti Express" and a magic carpet lift. Amenities include a pro shop, chalet, rentals, and lessons. Besides downhill skiing and snowboarding, there is also cross-country skiing with about 30 km (19 mi) of groomed trails. Wapiti Valley ski resort sees about 30,000 visitors a year.

== Wapiti Campground ==
Wapiti Campground is on the north side of the lake and has 20 rustic campsites. On the south side, there are ten RV sites and 15 private cabins. Summertime activities at the park include camping, boating, ATVing, fishing, hiking, hunting, and picnicking. In the winter, there is snowmobiling and ice fishing on Codette Lake.

== See also ==
- List of ski areas and resorts in Canada
- Tourism in Saskatchewan
