= Tobin Lake =

Reservoir in Saskatchewan, Canada

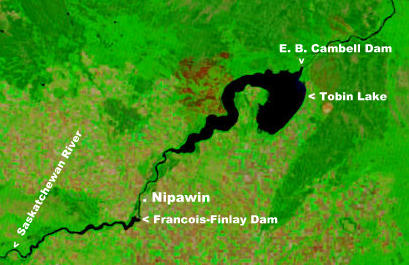
- NASA image of Tobin Lake

- Location in Saskatchewan Tobin Lake (Canada)
- Location: Saskatchewan
- Coordinates: 53°35′N 103°30′W
- Type: Reservoir
- Part of: Saskatchewan River drainage basin
- Primary inflows: Saskatchewan River, Petaigan River
- Primary outflows: Saskatchewan River
- Basin countries: Canada
- Max. length: 74 km (46 mi)
- Max. width: 15 km (9.3 mi)
- Surface area: 26,195.1 ha (64,730 acres)
- Max. depth: 26 m (85 ft)
- Water volume: 2,200,000 dam^{3} (7.8×10^{10} cu ft)
- Shore length^{1}: 252.1 km (156.6 mi)
- Surface elevation: 335 m (1,099 ft)
- Settlements: Tobin Lake
- ^{1} Shore length is not a well-defined measure.

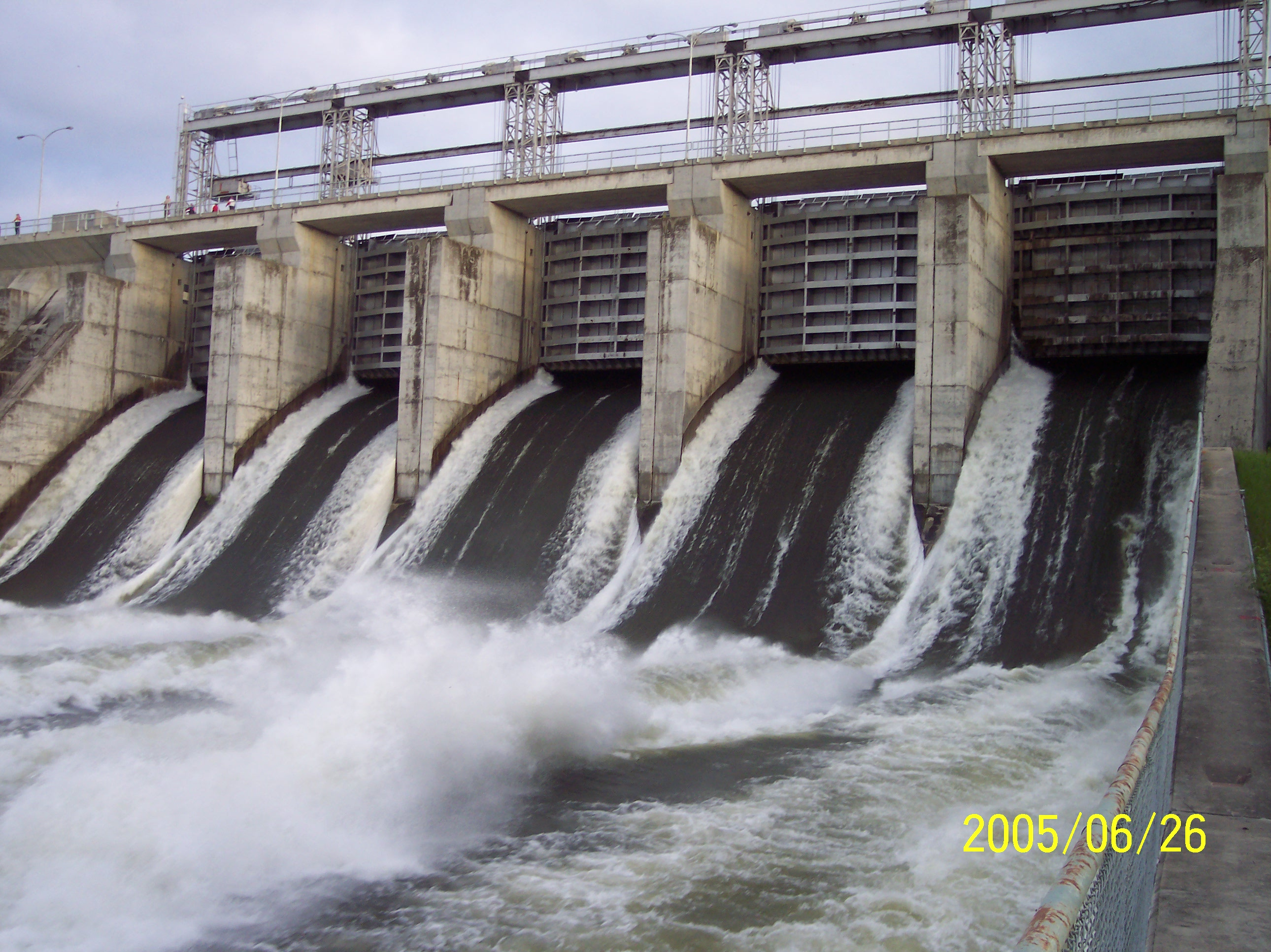
E.B. Campbell Dam Spillway

Tobin Lake is a reservoir along the course of the Saskatchewan River in the Canadian province of Saskatchewan. Tobin Lake was formed by the building of the E.B. Campbell Dam (known as Squaw Rapids Dam until 1983) on the Saskatchewan River in 1963. Tobin Lake is named for William Thorburn, who was a fur trader on the Saskatchewan River. He had built a trading post on the Saskatchewan River where it is met by the Petaigan River. The rapids near the post became known as the "Thornburn Rapids". The name was later shortened to "Tobin Rapids".

The town of Nipawin is near the western end of the lake and upstream from Nipawin along the Saskatchewan River is Codette Lake, which was formed by the construction of the Francois-Finlay Dam in 1986. Situated between these two man-made lakes, Nipawin earned the nickname The Town of Two Lakes.

Most of the lake is in the RMs of Moose Range No. 486 and Torch River No. 488; the northernmost shoreline is in the Northern Saskatchewan Administration District. Access to the west and north side of the lake is from Highway 35, the east side from Highway 123, and on the south-west corner from Highway 255. The resort community of Tobin Lake is on the southern shore and spread out along its over 250 kilometres (160 mi) of shoreline are several parks, outfitters, lodges, and campgrounds. The entire lake is an Important Bird Area of Canada.

== Tobin Lake IBA ==
The entirety of Tobin Lake and the marshes on the western end are part of the Tobin Lake (SK 099) Important Bird Area (IBA) of Canada. In total, the IBA covers 721.04 km^{2} (278.40 sq mi). Birds including tundra swans, American white pelicans, Bonaparte's gulls, and ring-billed gulls are found at the lake and neighbouring marshes.

== Parks and recreation ==
At the westernmost point of the lake is Maurice Street Wildlife Sanctuary (53.4634°N 103.9322°W). The Saskatchewan Natural History Society created the sanctuary in 1968. It preserves natural stands of boreal forest that harbours several species of birds and animals, such as woodpeckers, black bears, cougars, and raccoons.

Tobin Lake Recreation Site (53.5177°N 103.8024°W) is a provincial recreation site on the western shore of Tobin Lake. The park has a small campground called Caroll's Cove Campground. Caroll's Cove Campground has several well-treed campsites and rustic trappers' cabins that are semi-modern and sleep six set in boreal forest. The park also has a picnic area on the lake's shore, several marked hiking trails, and a number of fishing spots. Access is from Highway 35.

East of Tobin Lake Recreation Site is Pruden's Point Resort. Pruden's Point has many campsites and modern cabins for rent and facilities include potable water, showers, and laundry. At the resort, there's also a picnic area, sandy beach, and lake access for fishing. North of Pruden's Point, along Highway 35, is Tobin Lake Trophy Adventures. It is a two-storey, ten-bedroom outfitter's hunting and fishing lodge. Near the terminus of Highway 35 along the northern shore is Wilderness Ministries Bible Camp.

On the south-western shore of Tobin Lake is Serenity Bay Resort. The resort has cabin rentals, beach access, a boat launch, and 5 kilometres (3.1 mi) of hiking trails. North-east of Serenity Bay and south of the village of Tobin Lake on Highway 255 is Tobin Lake Leisure campground. On the southern edge of the village is Tobin Lake Hilltop Campground, which has RV campsites, beach and lake access, and mini-golf.

== Fish species ==
Tobin Lake is home to several species of fish including walleye, sauger, yellow perch, lake sturgeon, northern pike, goldeye, mooneye, lake whitefish, burbot, white sucker, longnose sucker, and shorthead redhorse.

Father Mariuz Zajac, from Carrot River, set the world ice fishing record for walleye here in 2005 with a catch of 8.3 kg (18 lb).

== See also ==
- List of lakes of Saskatchewan
- List of protected areas of Saskatchewan
- Tourism in Saskatchewan
