= Cumberland House Provincial Park =

Provincial park in Saskatchewan, Canada

- IUCN category III (natural monument or feature)
- Location within Saskatchewan Location within Canada
- Location: Saskatchewan, Canada
- Nearest city: Nipawin Hudson Bay
- Coordinates: 53°57′36″N 102°15′47″W
- Established: 1986 (provincial park)
- Governing body: Sask Parks; Provincial Historic Site

National Historic Site of Canada
- Official name: Cumberland House National Historic Site of Canada
- Designated: 1924

Cumberland House Provincial Park is a located on Cumberland Island at Cumberland House in the Canadian province of Saskatchewan. The site is the location of the first inland Hudson's Bay Company post in Saskatchewan and the oldest village in the province. A powder magazine shed (used to store explosives) built in 1886 and artifacts from the HBC Northcote steamship are the remaining historic elements on the site.

The site is located along a distributary called Bigstone River on the eastern edge of the delta made by the Saskatchewan River flowing into Cumberland Lake.

The site was designated a National Historic Site of Canada in 1924, and was protected as a historic park by the provincial government in 1986.

== History ==
Established in 1774, Cumberland House was an important stop for the transport of goods and passengers by steamship along the Saskatchewan River on routes between Grand Rapids, Manitoba on Lake Winnipeg and Edmonton and Medicine Hat to the west. It also served as a stop for smaller steamships that operated between the Pas and Prince Albert, Saskatchewan. Due to the arrival of the railway, steamship travel came to an end and the Northcote was beached at Cumberland House in 1886. It also served as an important transit point for copper ore from Flin Flon until the railway arrived in Flin Flon in 1925. Cumberland House was also an important administration and distribution centre as the Hudson's Bay Company until 1821 when the Hudson Bay Company and the North West Company merged and Norway House became the new inland headquarters.

== See also ==
- List of provincial parks in Saskatchewan
- List of protected areas of Saskatchewan
- List of National Historic Sites of Canada in Saskatchewan
- Tourism in Saskatchewan
