= Tobin Lake, Saskatchewan =

Village in Saskatchewan, Canada

Resort Village of Tobin Lake
- Resort village
- Resort Village of Tobin Lake
- Location within Saskatchewan
- Coordinates: 53.515°N 103.728°W
- Country: Canada
- Province: Saskatchewan
- Census division: 14
- Rural municipality: RM of Moose Range No. 486
- Incorporated: August 1, 1973

Government
  - Mayor: Darren Opp
  - Governing body: Resort Village of Tobin Lake
  - Administrator: Nathalie Hipkins
  - Assistant CAO: Tanya Regush

Area (2016)
  - Land: 1.81 km^{2} (0.70 sq mi)

Population (2016)
  - Total: 89
  - Density: 49.2/km^{2} (127/sq mi)
- Time zone: CST
  - Summer (DST): CST
- Area codes: 306 and 639
- Waterway(s): Tobin Lake
- Website: Official website

Tobin Lake (2016 population: 89) is a resort village in the Canadian province of Saskatchewan within Census Division No. 14. It is on the shores of Tobin Lake in the Rural Municipality of Moose Range No. 486. It is approximately 34 km (21 mi) northeast of Nipawin at the end of Highway 255, which is accessed via Highway 55.

== History ==
Tobin Lake incorporated as a resort village on August 1, 1973.

== Demographics ==
Population history (1981–2016)
Year	Pop.	±%
1981	22	—
1986	31	+40.9%
1991	23	−25.8%
1996	26	+13.0%
2001	45	+73.1%
2006	87	+93.3%
2011	90	+3.4%
2016	89	−1.1%
Source: Statistics Canada via Saskatchewan Bureau of Statistics

In the 2021 Census of Population conducted by Statistics Canada, Tobin Lake had a population of 139 living in 72 of its 186 total private dwellings, a change of 56.2% from its 2016 population of 89. With a land area of 2.29 km^{2} (0.88 sq mi), it had a population density of 60.7/km^{2} (157.2/sq mi) in 2021.

In the 2016 Census of Population conducted by Statistics Canada, the Resort Village of Tobin Lake recorded a population of 89 living in 40 of its 142 total private dwellings, a −1.1% change from its 2011 population of 90. With a land area of 1.81 km^{2} (0.70 sq mi), it had a population density of 49.2/km^{2} (127.4/sq mi) in 2016.

== Government ==
The Resort Village of Tobin Lake is governed by an elected municipal council and an appointed Administrator that meets on the second Tuesday of every month. The mayor is Darren Opp and the Administrator is Nathalie Hipkins.

== See also ==
- List of communities in Saskatchewan
- List of francophone communities in Saskatchewan
- List of municipalities in Saskatchewan
- List of resort villages in Saskatchewan
- List of villages in Saskatchewan
- List of summer villages in Alberta
