= Rural Municipality of Moose Range No. 486 =

Rural municipality in Saskatchewan, Canada

Moose Range No. 486
- Rural municipality
- Rural Municipality of Moose Range No. 486
- Location of the RM of Moose Range No. 486 in Saskatchewan
- Coordinates: 53.333°N 103.333°W
- Country: Canada
- Province: Saskatchewan
- Census division: 14
- SARM division: 4
- Formed: December 11, 1916

Government
  - Reeve: Bud Charko
  - Governing body: RM of Moose Range No. 486 Council
  - Administrator: Beverly Doerksen
  - Office location: Carrot River

Area (2016)
  - Land: 2,418.7 km^{2} (933.9 sq mi)

Population (2016)
  - Total: 1,000
  - Density: 0.4/km^{2} (1.0/sq mi)
- Time zone: CST
  - Summer (DST): CST
- Area codes: 306 and 639

The Rural Municipality of Moose Range No. 486 (2016 population: 1,000) is a rural municipality (RM) in the Canadian province of Saskatchewan within Census Division No. 14 and SARM Division No. 4.

== History ==
The RM of Moose Range No. 486 incorporated as a rural municipality on December 11, 1916.

== Geography ==
=== Communities and localities ===
The following urban municipalities are surrounded by the RM.

Towns

- Carrot River

Resort villages

- Tobin Lake

The following unincorporated communities are within the RM.

Localities

- Battle Heights
- Blue Jay
- Moose Range
- Pas Trail
- Petaigan
- Pruden's Point
- Ravendale
- Smoky Burn

== Demographics ==
Population history (1981–2016)
Year	Pop.	±%
1981	1,679	—
1986	1,612	−4.0%
1991	1,408	−12.7%
1996	1,300	−7.7%
2001	1,210	−6.9%
2006	1,086	−10.2%
2011	1,131	+4.1%
2016	1,000	−11.6%
Source: Statistics Canada via Saskatchewan Bureau of Statistics

In the 2021 Census of Population conducted by Statistics Canada, the RM of Moose Range No. 486 had a population of 942 living in 348 of its 391 total private dwellings, a change of −5.8% from its 2016 population of 1,000. With a land area of 2,423.98 km^{2} (935.90 sq mi), it had a population density of 0.4/km^{2} (1.0/sq mi) in 2021.

In the 2016 Census of Population, the RM of Moose Range No. 486 recorded a population of 1,000 living in 371 of its 417 total private dwellings, a −11.6% change from its 2011 population of 1,131. With a land area of 2,418.7 km^{2} (933.9 sq mi), it had a population density of 0.4/km^{2} (1.1/sq mi) in 2016.

== Attractions ==
- D. Gerbrandt Recreation Site, formerly "Squaw Rapids Provincial Recreation Site", (53.6891°N 103.3413°W) is a 74-hectare (180-acre) provincial recreation area leased and operated by Thunder Rapids Lodge. The park is on the southern shore of the Saskatchewan River at the foot of the E.B. Campbell Hydroelectric Station. It has camping, access to the river, and a day-use area. The adjoining lodge has cabins, boat rentals, and an outfitters with hunting and fishing guides.
- Pasquia Provincial Forest is a provincial forest that encompasses most of the Pasquia Hills.
- Pasquia Regional Park is a regional park along the Carrot River.
- Pasquia River Recreation Site is a road-side park along Highway 9 with access to the Pasquia River.

== Government ==
The RM of Moose Range No. 486 is governed by an elected municipal council and an appointed administrator that meets on the second Wednesday of every month. The reeve of the RM is Wilfred Wolowski while its administrator is Beverly Doerksen. The RM's office is located in Carrot River.

== Transportation ==
- Saskatchewan Highway 23
- Saskatchewan Highway 55
- Saskatchewan Highway 123
- Saskatchewan Highway 255
- Saskatchewan Highway 690
- Saskatchewan Highway 789
- Canadian National Railway

== See also ==
- List of rural municipalities in Saskatchewan
