= Nipawin Hydroelectric Station =

Hydroelectric Station in Saskatchewan, Canada

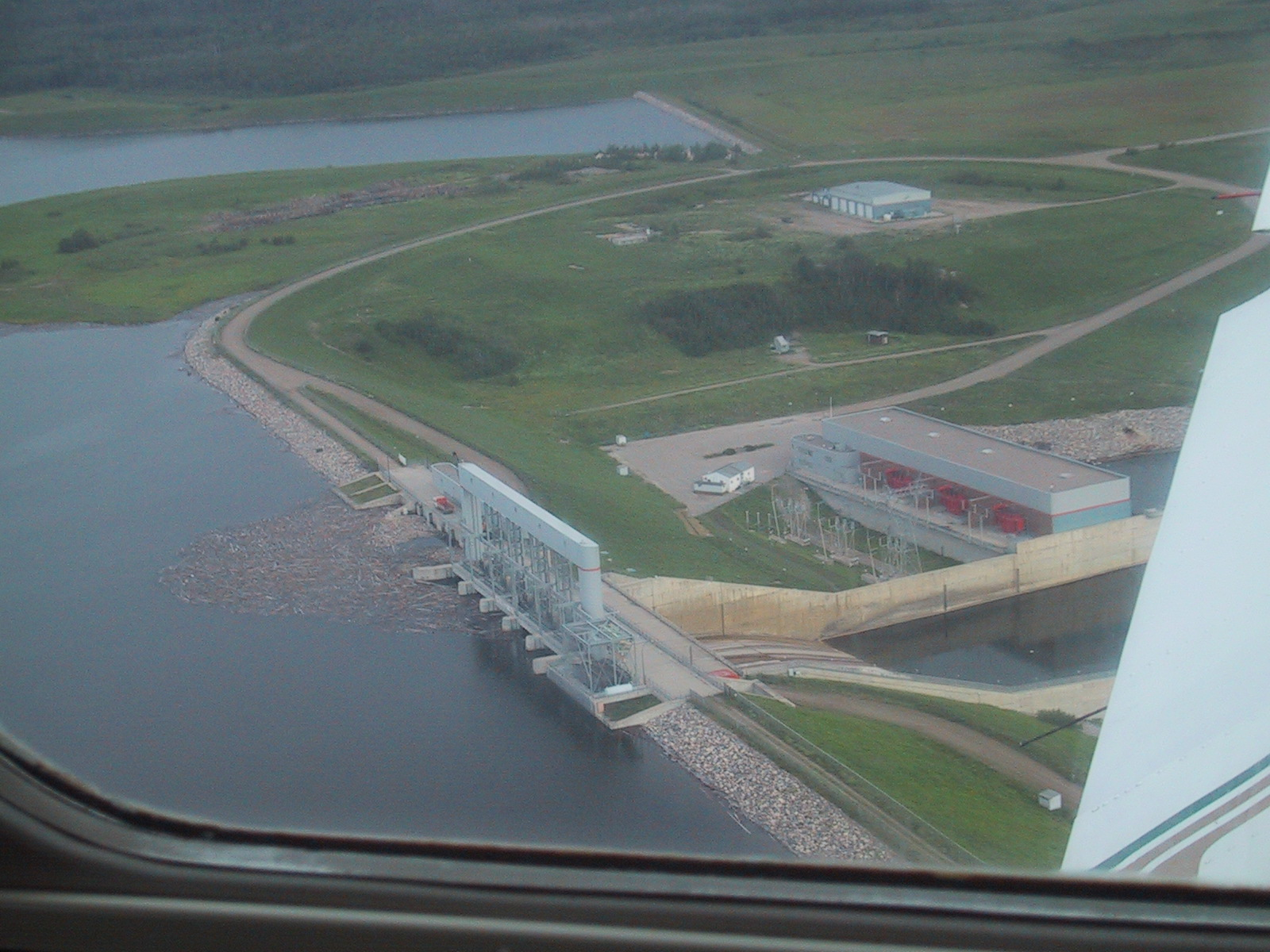
- Country: Canada
- Location: Nipawin No. 487 / Torch River No. 488, near Nipawin, Saskatchewan
- Coordinates: 53°19′11″N 104°2′31″W
- Status: Operational
- Commission date: 1985
- Owner: SaskPower

Thermal power station
- Primary fuel: Hydroelectric

Power generation
- Units operational: Francis turbine
- Nameplate capacity: 255 MW

Nipawin Hydroelectric Station is a hydroelectric station owned by SaskPower in the Canadian province of Saskatchewan. It is about 5 kilometres (3.1 mi) upstream from the town of Nipawin at the Francois-Finlay Dam. The dam, which was completed in 1986, crosses the Saskatchewan River creating Codette Lake, which supplies the water for the power station. The dam was named after James Finaly and Francois LeBlanc who had "constructed a trading post on the lower terrace of Bushfield Flats immediately upstream of the power station".

== Description ==
The Nipawin Hydroelectric Station has a capacity of 255MW, and consists of:

- one Hitachi 85 net MW unit (commissioned in 1985)
- two Hitachi 85 net MW units (commissioned in 1986)

It is possible to expand the station to five generating units, which would keep the baseload capacity at 255MW, but would increase the peak capacity to 420MW.

== See also ==
- List of generating stations in Saskatchewan
- E.B. Campbell Hydroelectric Station
- List of dams in Saskatchewan
