= L.P. Miller Comprehensive School =

Location
- P.O. Box 2650; Nipawin, Saskatchewan, S0E 1E0; Canada; 53.358820°N 104.002005°W

Information
- School type: High School
- Founded: 1969
- School board: North East School Division no. 200
- School number: Nipawin School Division no. 61
- Grades: 7-12
- Language: English
- Area: Nipawin
- Colours: Scarlet and Gold
- Team name: Bears
- Website: lpmiller.nesd.ca

L.P. Miller Comprehensive School is a school in Nipawin, Saskatchewan. Located in north east Saskatchewan, L.P. Miller is a part of the North East School Division #200.

Its sports teams go by the name LP Miller Bears.

This school has shop classes including electrical, carpentry, mechanics, machining, drafting, automotive, and welding. Additionally, practical and applied arts courses include computers, theatre arts and foods.

The current principal of the school is Nicole Stadnek, and the vice principal is Kevin Stene.
