= Territorial Court of the Northwest Territories =

Canadian court

The Territorial Court of the Northwest Territories is the lower trial court of the Northwest Territories, Canada. It hears cases relating to criminal law and family law.

== Judges of the Territorial Court of the Northwest Territories ==
- The Honourable Chief Judge Christine Gagnon
- The Honourable Judge Bernadette E. Schmaltz
- The Honourable Judge Robert D. Gorin
- The Honourable Judge Garth E. Malakoe
