= Carlea, Saskatchewan =

Former railway station and hamlet in Saskatchewan, Canada

Coordinates: 53°09′00″N 103°54′02″W

Carlea is a former Canadian National Railway railway station and hamlet in northeastern Saskatchewan, Canada.

The name "Carlea" was created from the first few letters of the names of two rivers that meet nearby, the Carrot and the Leather.

== See also ==
- List of communities in Saskatchewan
