= Elk Hill, Saskatchewan =

Community in Saskatchewan, Canada

Coordinates: 53°16′59″N 104°13′00″W

Location of Elk Hill in Saskatchewan

Elk Hill is a hamlet in the Canadian province of Saskatchewan.

== See also ==
- List of communities in Saskatchewan
