= Cumberland House, Saskatchewan =

Village in Saskatchewan, Canada

Cumberland House Wāskahikanihk
- Northern village
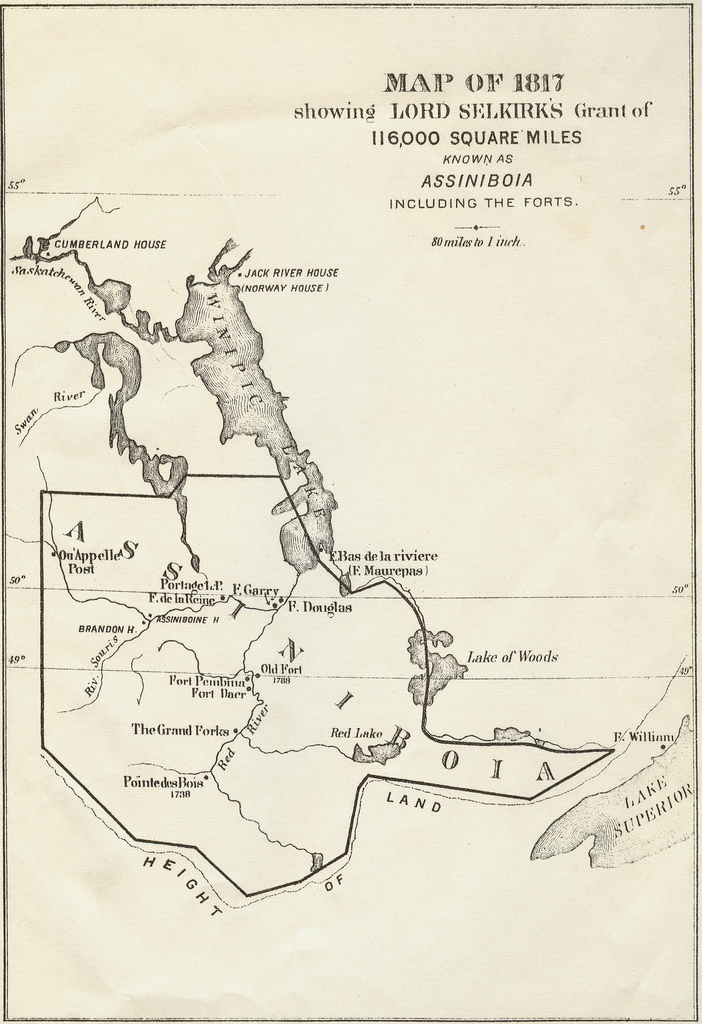
- Map of the Red River Colony showing Cumberland House

- Location of Cumberland House in Saskatchewan
- Coordinates: 53°56′29″N 102°18′45″W
- Country: Canada
- Province: Saskatchewan
- District: Northern Saskatchewan Administration District
- Census division: 18
- Time zone: CST
- Area code: 306
- Website: Official website

Cumberland House (Swampy Cree: Wāskahikanihk) is a community in Census Division No. 18 in northeast Saskatchewan, Canada on the Saskatchewan River. It is the oldest community in Saskatchewan. Cumberland House Provincial Park, which provides tours of an 1890s powder house built by the Hudson's Bay Company, is located nearby.

The community is on Cumberland Island and consists of the Northern Village of Cumberland House with a population of 772 and the adjoining Cumberland House Cree Nation with a population of 715. The community is served by the Cumberland House Airport and by Highway 123.

== Cumberland House Cree Nation ==
The population of Cumberland House consists of mostly First Nations people, including Cree and Métis. Cumberland House was and is a Cree "n" dialect community, known in Cree as "Wāskahikanihk".

In March 2013, Cumberland House Cree Nation had a registered population of 1,387 with 814 members living on-reserve or crown land and 573 members living off-reserve. The First Nation has territory at five locations and is governed by a Chief and four councillors. It is a member of the Prince Albert Grand Council.

== History ==
=== Fur trade depot ===
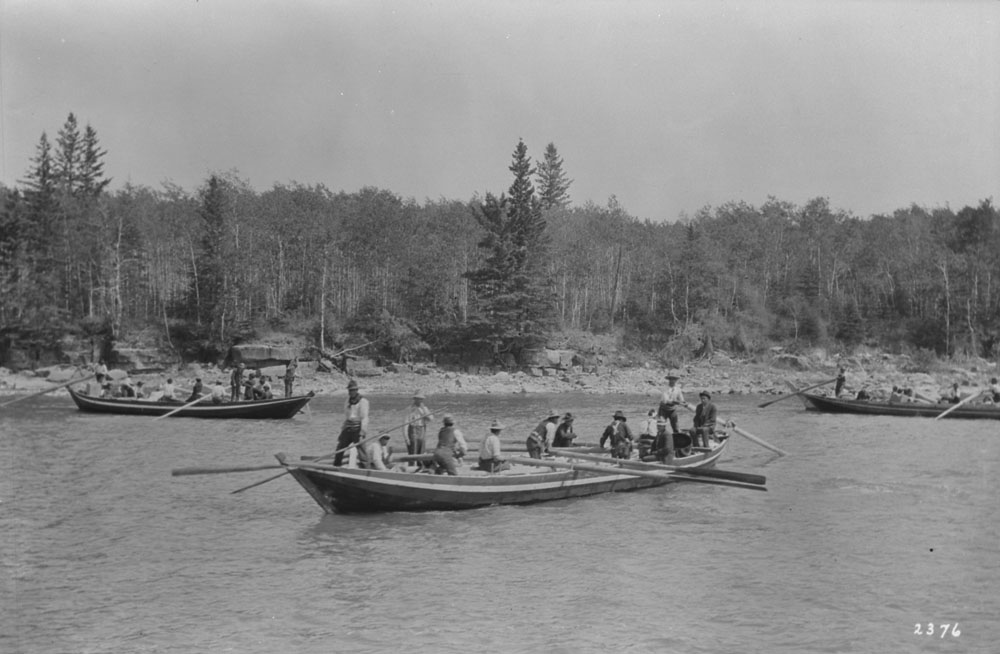
York boats on the Saskatchewan River at Cumberland House

From its foundation in 1774, Cumberland House was one of the most important fur trade depots in Canada. To the east, the Saskatchewan River led to Lake Winnipeg and on to Montreal or Hudson Bay. To the west, the river led to the Rocky Mountains and a pass to Oregon Country. To the north, the Sturgeon-Weir River led to the Churchill River, which led to the Methye Portage and the rich Athabasca Country to the northwest. During the construction of Cumberland House, the traders were challenged by the inland location and their unfamiliarity with crafting canoes. During the completion of the community's construction, the traders had developed the required proficiency to travel.

Cumberland House was used as a depot for eastbound furs and westbound trade goods. It was also a depot for pemmican used to feed the voyageurs on their long journey to Lake Athabasca. Since it was in the forest belt, pemmican was brought downriver from the prairies or upriver from Lake Winnipeg. It was about 40 days' paddling time from the Hudson's Bay Company base at York Factory but nearly five months' journey from their competitor's base at Montreal. Cumberland House was located on a strip of land between the Saskatchewan to the south and Cumberland Lake to the north. The lake drained into the river a mile or so to the west. Today, the strip is wider because of changes in the lake level.

As in much of Canada, the first European visitors were probably coureurs des bois, who left no records. The first European known to have passed the site was Louis-Joseph Gaultier de La Vérendrye, in the spring of 1749. A private fur trader, Joseph Frobisher, set up a temporary post on Cumberland Lake in 1772. Samuel Hearne established the permanent HBC post in 1774. It is sometimes said to be the first inland post of the company, which was strictly speaking Henley House, established in 1743, but that was an isolated event. Cumberland House was the first post established when the inland policy was adopted. Hearne took the Grass River (Manitoba) route from York Factory which led him to Cumberland Lake. A month after Hearne had finished building, Thomas and Joseph Frobisher arrived on their way to intercept HBC furs at Frog Portage. The next year, Mathew Cocking was in charge, and the two Frobishers reappeared, along with Alexander Henry the elder.

From 1778 to 1804, it was the administrative centre of the western posts. In 1793, the North West Company built a competing post nearby. About the same time, the Hudson's Bay Company fort was moved to a new site across from the North West Company post. In 1821, the two forts were merged. At the time, there were 30 men at the post and about the same number of women and children. The post declined after about 1830 but revived somewhat with the introduction of steamboats on the river in 1874. By 1980, the powder magazine and the house of the Hudson's Bay Company manager were still there.

=== Later ===
On June 24, 2005, Cumberland House residents were evacuated to Prince Albert, Saskatchewan, and housed in a shelter set up by the Red Cross at the SIAST (now called Saskatchewan Polytechnic) campus due to impending flooding from the Saskatchewan River. The influx of water was from record-breaking rainfall in Alberta, where the North and South Saskatchewan Rivers collected the runoff from that rainfall.

== Demographics ==
In the 2021 Census of Population conducted by Statistics Canada, Cumberland House had a population of 540 living in 192 of its 241 total private dwellings, a change of −31.7% from its 2016 population of 791. With a land area of 16.11 km^{2} (6.22 sq mi), it had a population density of 33.5/km^{2} (86.8/sq mi) in 2021.

== Transportation ==
Cumberland House is the northern terminus of Highway 123. The community is located on Pine Island. The first bridge to the mainland, across the Saskatchewan River, was built in 1996, replacing a ferry during the summer months and ice crossings in the winter. The community is also serviced by the Cumberland House Airport.

On 24 May, 2024, the community declared a state of emergency after rains washed out the only road connecting it to the rest of the world.

== Notable people ==
- Keith Goulet, a former politician and Saskatchewan's first Indigenous Cabinet Minister
- Alexander Kennedy Isbister
- Gerald M. Morin, the first Cree-speaking provincial judge

== See also ==
- North American fur trade
- Voyageurs
- Saskatchewan River fur trade
