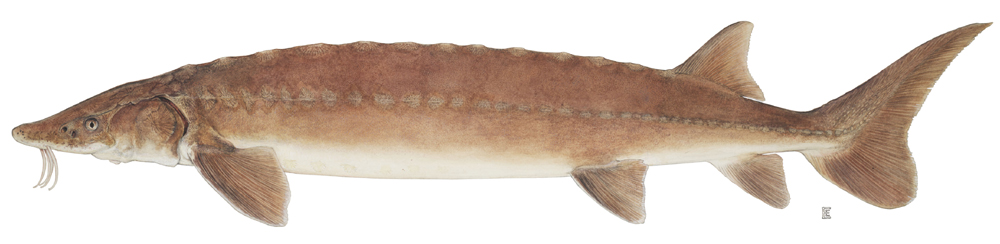

Conservation status
- Endangered (IUCN 3.1)

- Vulnerable (NatureServe)

Scientific classification
- Kingdom: Animalia
- Phylum: Chordata
- Class: Actinopterygii
- Order: Acipenseriformes
- Family: Acipenseridae
- Genus: Acipenser
- Species: A. fulvescens

Binomial name
- Acipenser fulvescens (Rafinesque, 1817)

Synonyms
- List: Sterletus serotinus (Rafinesque 1820); Acipenser (Huso) anasimos Duméril 1870; Acipenser (Huso) anthracinus Duméril 1870; Acipenser (Huso) atelaspis Duméril 1870; Acipenser (Antaceus) buffalo Duméril 1867; Acipenser carbonarius Agassiz 1850; Acipenser cataphractus Rapp ex Gray 1835; Acipenser (Antaceus) cincinnati Duméril 1867; Acipenser (Huso) copei Duméril 1870; Acipenser (Huso) honneymani Duméril 1870; Acipenser (Huso) kirtlandii Duméril 1870; Acipenser laevis Agassiz 1850; Acipenser (Huso) lamarii Duméril 1870; Acipenser liopeltis Günther 1870; Accipenser macrostomus Rafinesque 1820; Acipenser maculosus Lesueur 1818; Acipenser (Huso) megalaspis Duméril 1870; Acipenser (Huso) nertinianus Duméril 1870; Accipenser ohiensis Rafinesque 1820; Acipenser (Huso) paranasimos Duméril 1870; Acipenser (Huso) platyrhinus Duméril 1870; Acipenser (Huso) rafinesquii Duméril 1870; Acipenser (Huso) rauchii Duméril 1870; Acipenser rhynchaeus Agassiz 1850; Acipenser (Huso) richardsoni Duméril 1870; Acipenser (Huso) rosarium Duméril 1870; Acipenser rubicundus Lesueur 1818; Acipenser rupertianus Richardson 1836

= Lake sturgeon =

Lake sturgeon Temporal range: Pleistocene - Recent

Species of fish

The lake sturgeon (Acipenser fulvescens) is one of the 27 species of sturgeon globally, and one of the 10 species of sturgeon and paddlefish in North America. It occurs from the Hudson Bay to the Mississippi River basin and is one of the largest freshwater fish in North America, growing to up to 7 ft (2.1 m) in length. The species has historically and in current times been an important sustenance and sports fishery target; overfishing has contributed to its current IUCN classification as an Endangered species. Lake sturgeon play a fundamental role in Native American culture, spirituality, and way of life.

== Life history and ecology ==
Lake sturgeon are potamodromous, cartilaginous fish with a life history strategy characterized by a long-life span, relatively old age-to-maturity, intermittent spawning, and opportunisitic/generalist supra-benthic feeding behavior.

Similar to other Acipenser species, lake sturgeon have five rows of bony scutes, four barbels on the ventral side of the rostrum anterior of the protrusible mouth, large pectoral fins, and a heterocercal tail. Lake sturgeon are one of the largest freshwater fish in North America, and grow up to over 7 feet long, and weigh well over 250 pounds.

Being opportunistic and generalist feeders, the diet of lake sturgeon varies depending on the size and age of the fish, and the geographic location and available food resources within the system they inhabitat. Lake sturgeon rely on tactile, olfactory, chemosensory, and electrosensory receptors to locate prey within the substrate. Primarily feeding on benthic macroinvertebrates, such as mayflies, chrionimids, stoneflies, lake sturgeon will also opportunistically eat small fish, mussels, and other crustaceans.

== Taxonomy ==
Brownstein and Near (2025) published a paper proposing a new generic taxonomy that reclassifies the traditional genera Acipenser and Huso. The new taxonomoy is based on a combination of mitochondrial and nuclear DNA data and morphological data. Considering the importance of a reliable classification for species threatened with extinction, the IUCN Sturgeon Specialist Group, and the World Sturgeon Conservation Society discussed the proposed changes at a joint meeting during the 10th annual International Sturgeon Symposium, in Yichang, China, on October 22, 2025. This reclassification proposed by Brownstein and Near (2025) was widely not supported, and remains unaccepted in scientific literature and by the American Fisheries Society.

== Distribution and habitat ==
The historical geographic native range of lake sturgeon extended from Hudson Bay, throughout the Laurentian Great Lakes Region, and throughout the Mississippi River Basin and connecting tributaries and freshwater lakes. Many populations of lake sturgeon have recovered through harvest restrictions, habitat restoration, and stocking program intiatives. In the Great Lakes Region, populations of lake sturgeon in the Lake Winnebago System, St. Clair River/Detroit River System, Black Lake Michigan, St. Lawrence River, and the St. Marys River have recovered through collaboration between federal, state, and tribal restoration intiatives.

Throughout the range of the lake sturgeon, these areas were linked by large lakes that formed as the glaciers retreated from North America at the end of the last ice age (e.g., Lake Agassiz, Lake Iroquois).

Lake sturgeon are known to migrate long distances for spawning, in search of food, or in response to seasonal environmental conditions.

The abundance of prey also plays a large factor in finding a suitable habitat for sturgeon of all life stages.

== Life cycle ==
Lake sturgeon are a very long-lived species. Validated ages from otoliths have shown individuals up to 68 years old, although individuals reaching up to 150 years old is not uncommon. In a 2026 study, statistical models made predictions of lifespan from size data across recaptures from different populations in the Midwest.

Estimated ages vary among populations, and a 160 cm fork length male lake sturgeon has an estimated age range of 90 to 279 years. Ages for a 180 cm fork length female are estimated from 99 to 427 years.

Lake sturgeon lifespan estimates suggest they may be one of the longest-lived vertebrates, and therefore one of the longest-lived fish species alongside the Greenland shark and Rougheye rockfish, respectively. They grow quickly during a lengthy juvenile stage.

=== Early life ===
Eggs typically hatch after 8 to 14 days. Observations suggest lake sturgeon and other fish and invertebrates likely consume some fertilized eggs while on the spawning grounds.

At hatching, the larvae are barely discernible and are about 10 mm long. Larvae are negatively phototactic, and remain in the interstitial places of large cobble and rocks. About two weeks after hatching, larvae drift downstream with the current, and are known to drift at night to avoid predation.

As juveniles, they can remain in their natal streams for several years before venturing out to shallow river mouths, bays, and lacustrine, or lake-like systems, preferring depths greater than 6 feet.

=== Reproduction ===
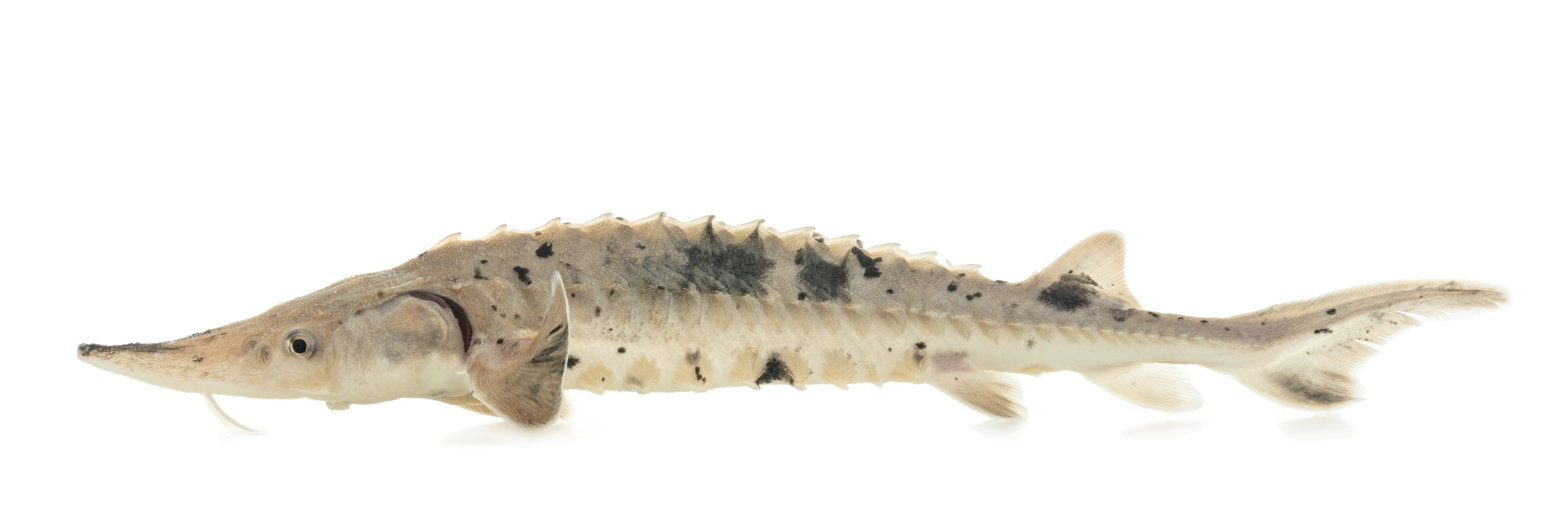
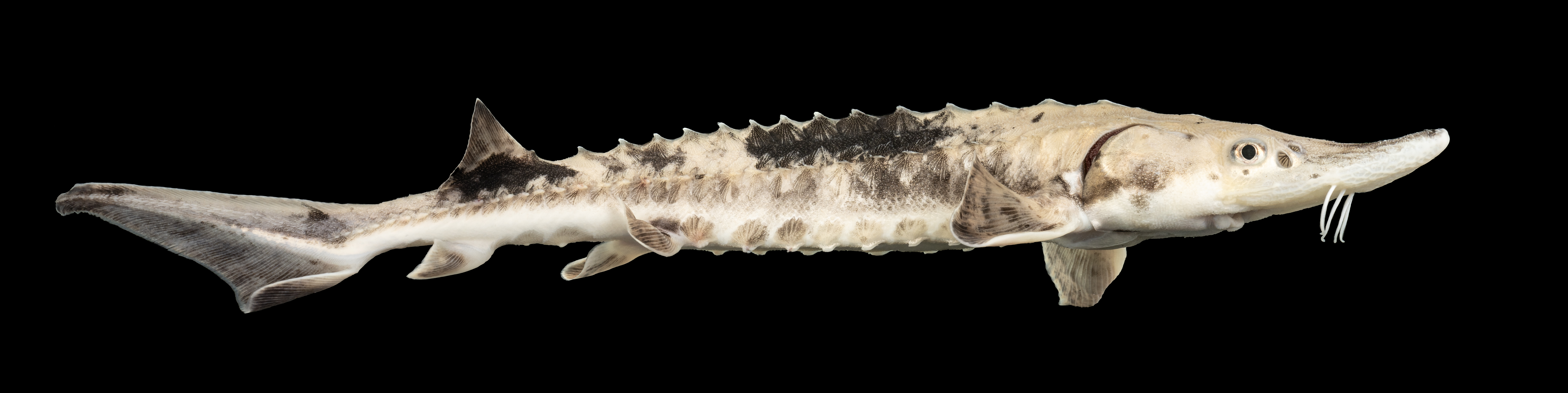
Juveniles

Male lake sturgeon do not reach reproductive maturity until 15-20 years old, and females take up to 20-25 years. Lake sturgeon are also intermittent spawners, and have spawning cycles every 3 to 5 years instead of annually like most freshwater fish.

Lake sturgeon will migrate great distances to reach suitable spawning habitat, often returning to their natal streams for reproduction. They spawn on clean, gravel shoals and stream rapids, usually from April to June. They prefer to spawn in temperatures between 55 and 64 °F (13 and 18 °C). Lake sturgeon reproduce by swimming around each other in circles and shaking violently; the male stops circling when he has released his sperm and the female then lays her eggs. Female lake sturgeon lay 4,000 to 7,000 eggs per pound of fish. Males spawn every 2 to 7 years while females spawn every 4 to 9 years. Only 10 to 20 percent of adult lake sturgeon are sexually active during a season.

Lake sturgeon are polygamous, maximizing genetic diversity.

== Conservation ==
In the 1800s and early 1900s lake sturgeon populations declined throughout their native range due to unregulated commercial fishing practices and habitat loss that followed European settlement and colonization of North America. As the commercial fishing industry grew in the Great Lakes, lake sturgeon were initially seen as a nuisance fish that damaged nets intended for other species, and as a result, were indiscriminately thrown along the shorelines.

When their meat and eggs became prized, commercial fishermen targeted them. Between 1879 and 1900, the Great Lakes commercial sturgeon fishery brought in an average of 4 million pounds (1,800 t) per year. Such unsustainable catch rates were coupled with environmental challenges, such as pollution and the construction of dams and other flood control measures. Sturgeon, which return each spring to spawn in the streams and rivers in which they were born, found tributaries blocked and spawning shoals destroyed by silt from agriculture and lumbering. In the 20th century, drastic drops in sturgeon catches, increased regulations, and the closure of viable fisheries occurred. Currently, 19 of the 20 states within the fish's original U.S. range list it as either threatened or endangered. It is considered "Vulnerable" by NatureServe.

This sturgeon is a valuable gourmet food fish, as well as a source of specialty products including caviar and isinglass. "In 1860, this species, taken on incidental catches of other fishes, was killed and dumped back in the lake, piled up on shore to dry and be burned, fed to pigs, or dug into the earth as fertilizer." It was even stacked like cordwood and used to fuel steamboats. Once its value was realized, "They were taken by every available means from spearing and jigging to set lines of baited or unbaited hooks laid on the bottom to trap nets, pound nets and gillnets." Over 5 million pounds of lake sturgeon were taken from Lake Erie in a single year. The fishery collapsed, largely by 1900. Like most sturgeons, the lake sturgeon is rare now and is protected in many areas.

In addition to overharvesting, it has also been negatively affected by pollution and loss of migratory waterways. It is vulnerable to population declines through overfishing due to its extremely slow reproductive cycle; most individuals caught before 20 years of age have never bred and females spawn only once every four or five years. The specific harvesting of breeding females for their roe is also damaging to population size. Few individuals ever reach the extreme old age or large size that those of previous generations often did.

=== Restoration ===
Despite historical declines throughout their native range, some lake sturgeon populations have begun to recover in localized areas where management plans and restoration efforts have been entacted. States, Tribal Nations, and Provinces have collaborated to successfully rehabilitate populations through dam removal, habitat restoration, harvest restrictions, stocking programs, and commitment to long-term montiroing and evaluation.

In 2001, transmitters placed into ten sturgeon and egg mats placed in the Detroit River documented spawning of sturgeon for the first time in many decades. This discovery followed the 2001 discovery of spawning runs under the Blue Water Bridge in the St. Clair River.

The Little River Band of Ottawa Indians (LRBOI) Sturgeon Program began in 2001 in Manistee, MI. In 2002 they successfully documented natural reproduction of lake sturgeon by capturing larvae (newly hatched fish) from the Big Manistee River. The Streamside Rearing Facility for lake sturgeon on the Big Manistee River became operational in the spring of 2004 and marked the first time this technique had ever been used for this species. Since that time there have been five Streamside Rearing Facilities operating within the Lake Michigan Basin built on the same LRBOI design. Many agencies now collaborate on this effort including the U.S. Fish and Wildlife Service, the states of Michigan and Wisconsin, and many other partners. The LRBOI Nmé Stewardship Plan, created by biologists and Tribal members, was published in 2005 as a guiding document for the LRBOI sturgeon program and sturgeon restoration. New York State has also had a successful recovery program, using eggs and sperm collected from a spawning area on the St. Lawrence River. In early June 2017, aquatic biologists conducted the annual assisted propagation effort, through which 130,000 fertilized eggs were sent to hatcheries.

Several populations of lake sturgeon have begun to be restored by the U.S. Fish and Wildlife Service in cooperation with locally managed fisheries from North Carolina to the Great Lakes. To better understand their life cycle, USFWS tags individual sturgeon and records abundance, distribution, age, growth and health of the population. While strict regulations have been put in place to monitor harvests, hatcheries are a key component of restoration efforts.

Wolf Lake State Fish Hatchery in Kalamazoo, MI, raises and releases lake sturgeon. The lake sturgeon are produced mainly for inland waters, although a few are stocked in Great Lakes waters.

There is also a streamside rearing facility near Onaway, Michigan, on the Black River, a tributary of the Cheboygan River, then Lake Huron. The facility is run and managed by the Michigan Department of Natural Resources, Michigan State University, and Tower Kliber. Each year hundreds to thousands of sturgeon are raised and released into Black Lake, and other surrounding areas. Adult sturgeon are caught in the river, their eggs and sperm are extracted and then taken back to the hatchery for fertilization, and left to incubate. Hatched larvae are also caught in the river with drift nets. The hatchery is open to the public, and visitors can also watch the hatchery workers catch the fish.

== Recreational fishing ==
Limited sturgeon fishing seasons are permitted in only a few areas, including some locations in Minnesota, Wisconsin, and Michigan. Fishing for sturgeon is allowed on Black Lake in Michigan, for example, but the fishery is limited to five total fish taken each year, each over 36 in (910 mm) and taken through the ice with spears.

Anglers in Minnesota have the opportunity to harvest one lake sturgeon per calendar year between 45 and 50 in on the Rainy River, and Lake of the Woods on the Canada–US border. The early season runs from April 24 to May 7 each year with the late season running from July 1 to September 30. Anglers must have a valid Minnesota fishing license and purchase a sturgeon tag to harvest a lake sturgeon.

An annual sturgeon spearing season is open on Lake Winnebago in Wisconsin. It has changed from a 16-day season in the past to a season with a marked quota, but the season can still run for the full 16 days. If 90–99% of the quota is reached on any day, the season is over at 1:00 pm the following day. If 100% (or more) of the quota is reached, the Wisconsin Department of Natural Resources can enable an emergency stoppage rule. In 2012, the largest sturgeon ever caught on Lake Winnebago (a female) was 125 years old, weighed 240 lb., and measured 87.5 in. in length. It was tagged and released by scientists from the Wisconsin Department of Natural Resources.

== Cultural significance ==
Lake sturgeon have long played a fundamental role in Native American culture, spirituality, and way of life. They are seen as knowledge holders and symbols of generosity, wisdom, and selflessness.

Traditionally, lake sturgeon also play an important role in structuring the Anishinaabe clan system. The Sturgeon Clan holds immense cultural and spiritual significance, with direct connections to stellar constellations, clan symbols often represent the responsibilities and interconnectedness of tribal nations.

Historically, lake sturgeon provided sustenance for Native Americans throughout the winter, and brought Indigenous peoples together for traditional ceremonies, feasts, reconnection, and inter-tribal trade. Native Americans utilized every part of the lake sturgeon, including the meat, eggs, isinglass, and bones for traditional and ceremonial purposes. After European colonization of the Great Lakes region, lake sturgeon were a valued trade item, and European settlers utilized the meat, eggs, and isinglass, as a beer and wine clarifier.

== Gallery ==
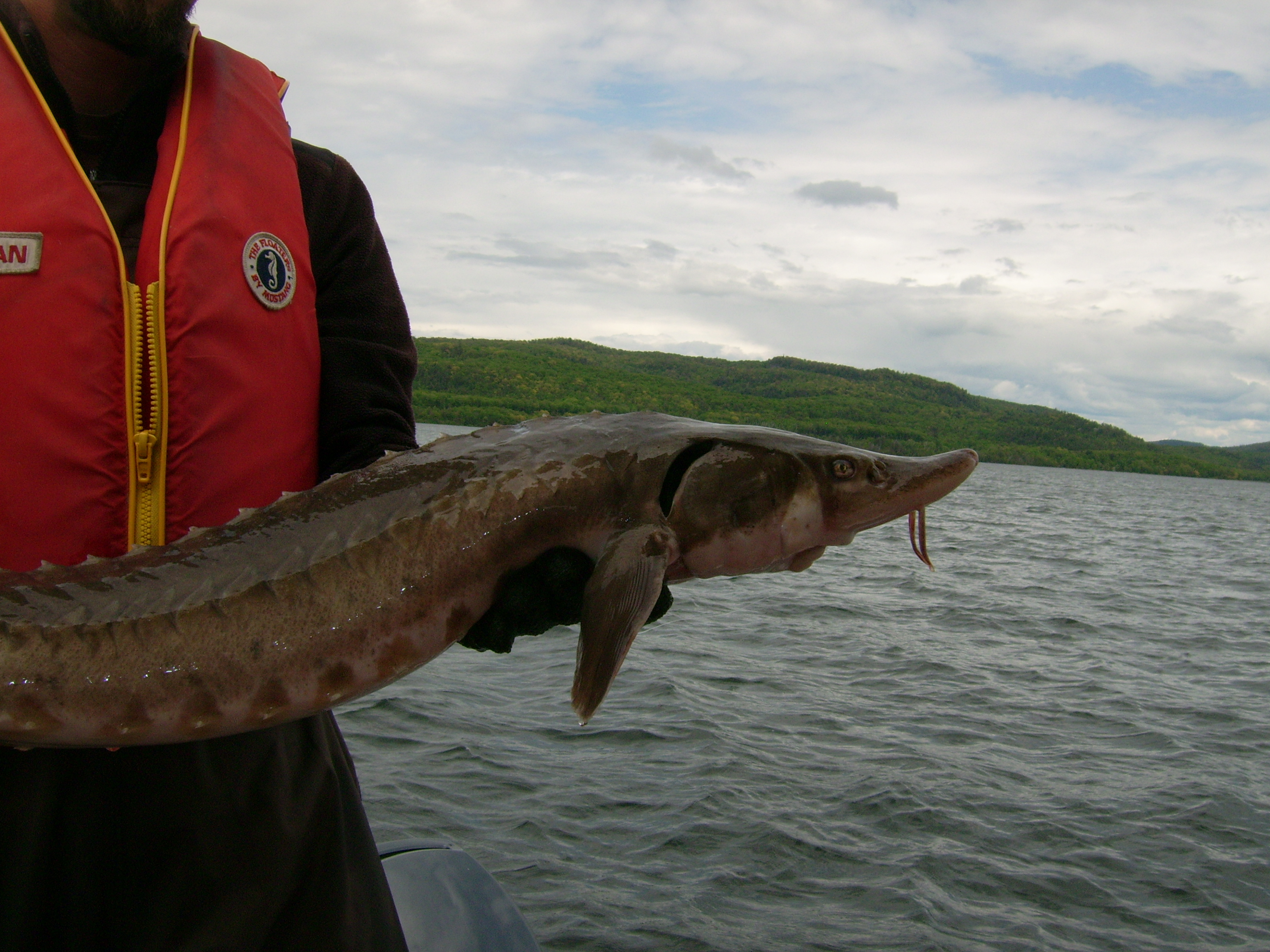
lake sturgeon, Batchawana Bay, Lake Superior (live released)

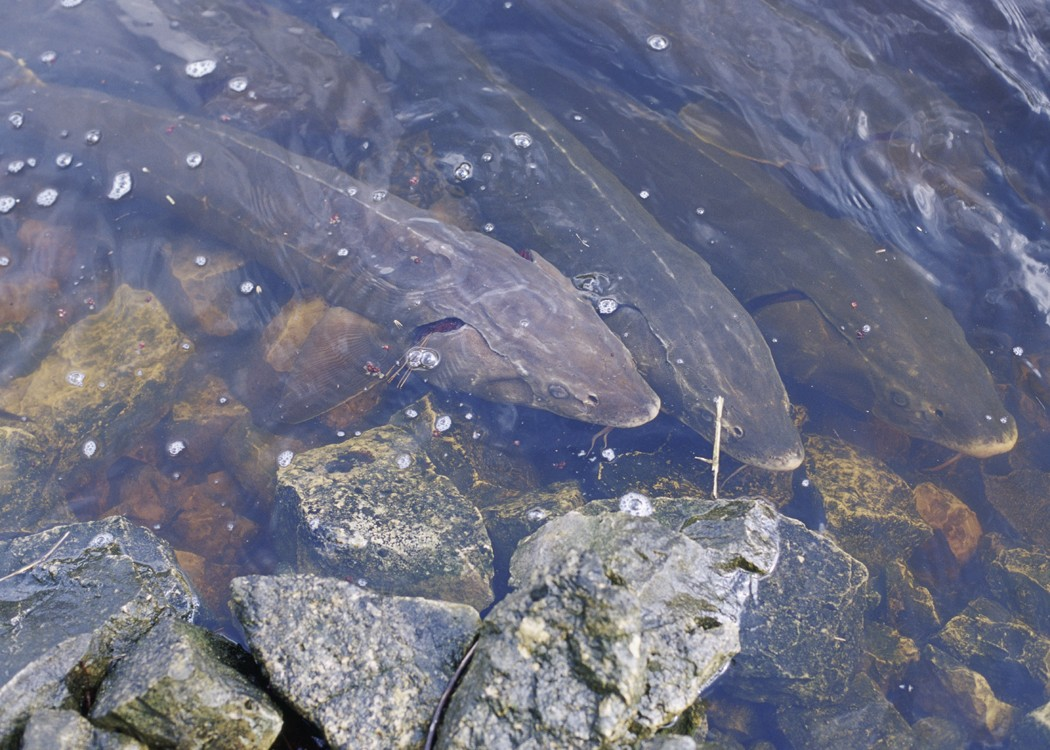
lake sturgeon

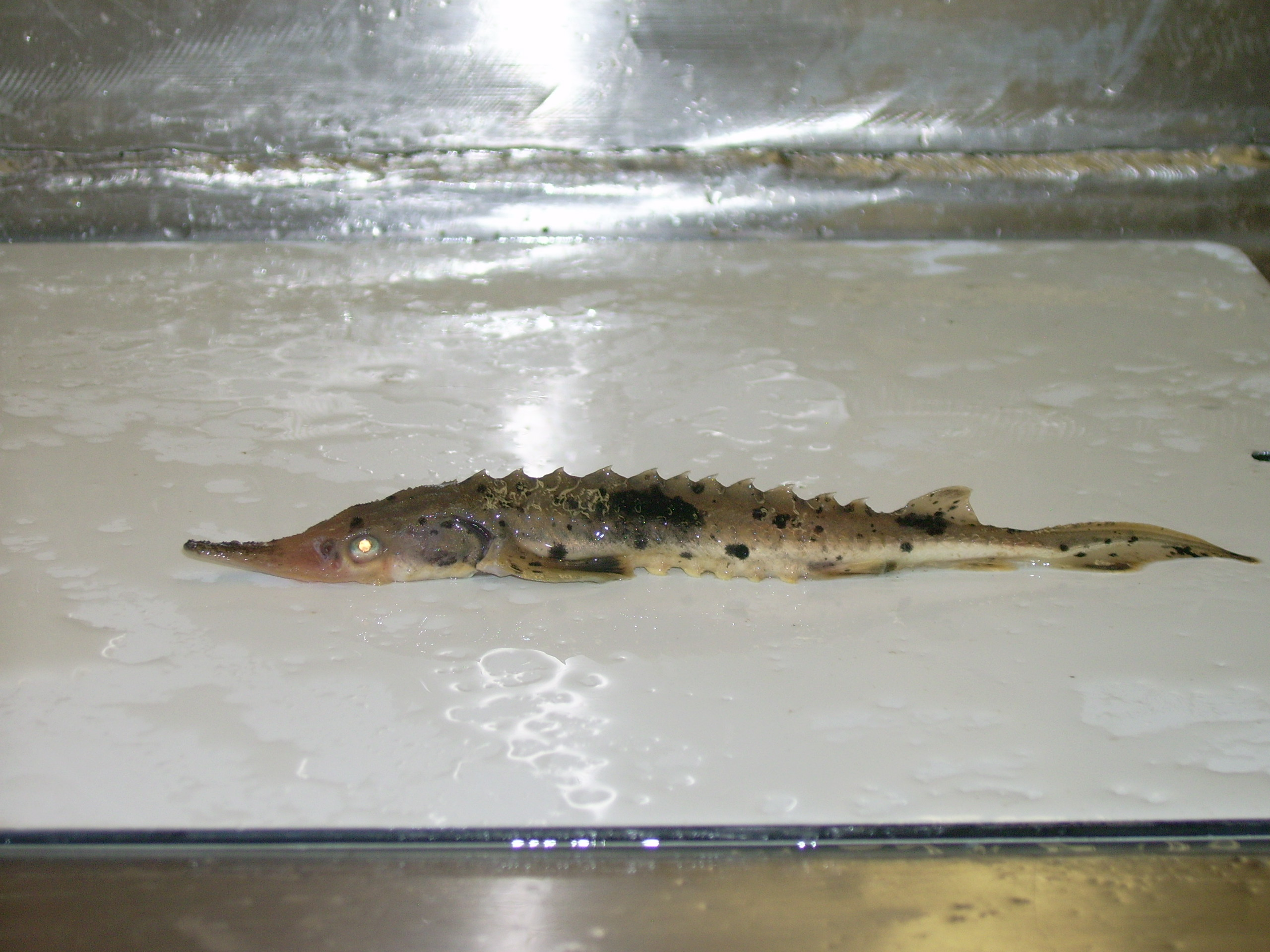
Juvenile lake sturgeon
Goulais Bay, Lake Superior

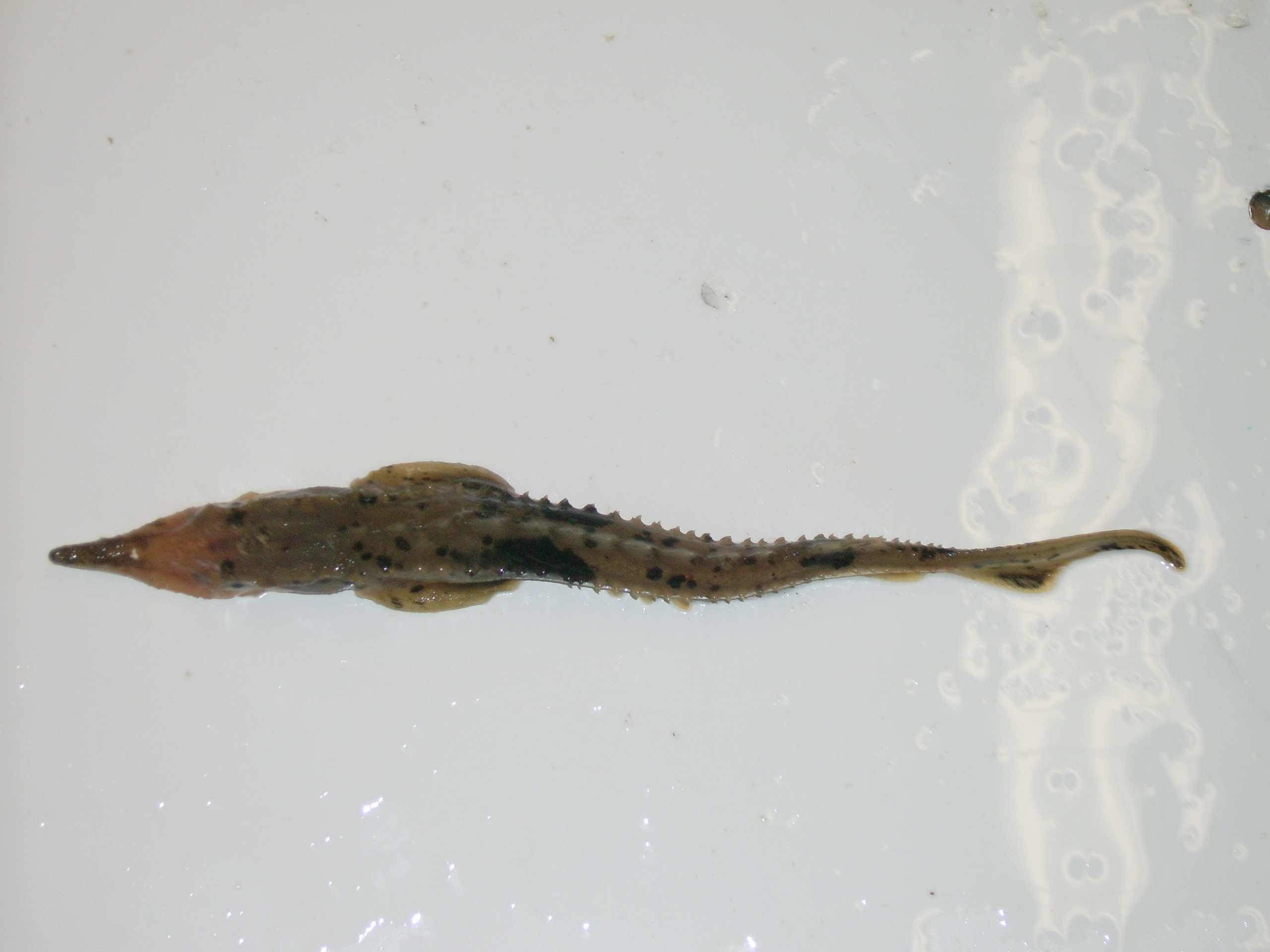
Juvenile lake sturgeon
Goulais Bay, Lake Superior

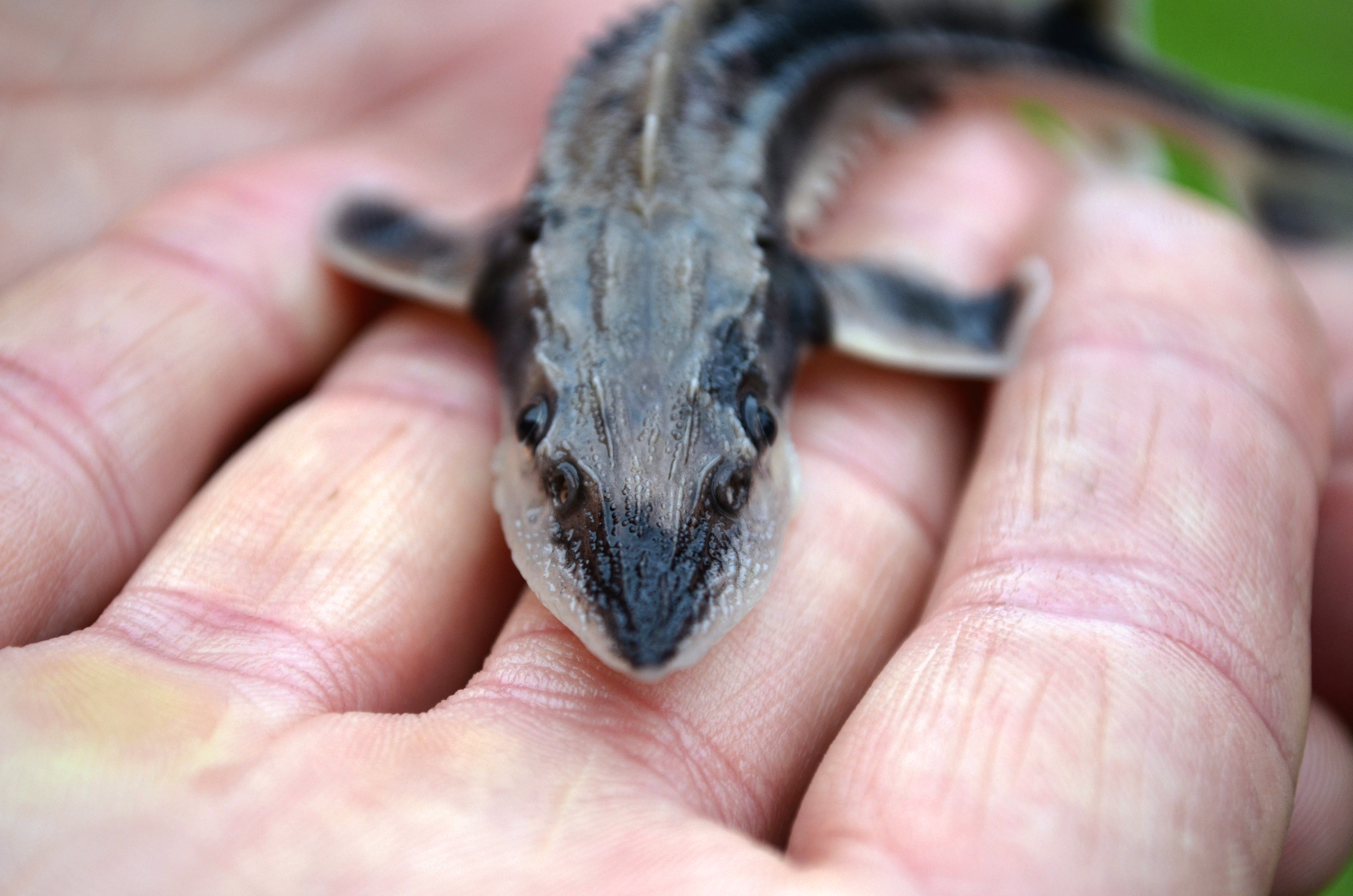
A very young juvenile lake sturgeon

== See also ==
- Saskatchewan River Sturgeon Management Board
