= Carrot River, Saskatchewan =

Town in Saskatchewan, Canada

Carrot River ᐅᐢᑳᑖᐢᑯ ᓰᐲᕽ oskâtâsko-sîpîhk
- Town
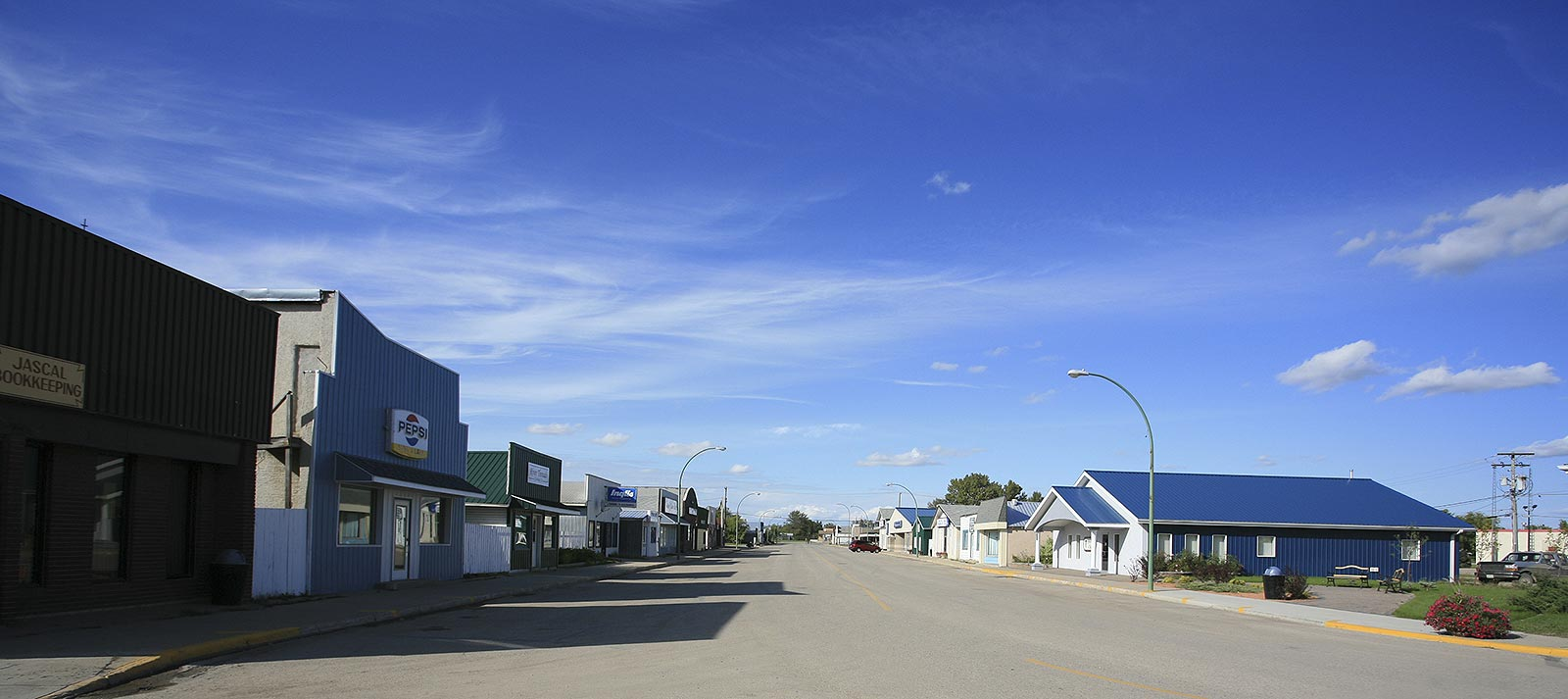
- Carrot River's Main Street

- Location within Saskatchewan
- Coordinates: 53.282022°N 103.585711°W
- Country: Canada
- Province: Saskatchewan
- Census division: 14
- Rural Municipality: Moose Range
- Post office Founded: 1931
- Incorporated (Village): 1941
- Incorporated (Town): 1948

Government
  - Mayor: Roman Charko
  - Administrator: Taryn Bryson
  - Governing body: Carrot River Town Council
  - Federal Electoral District of Prince Albert M.P.: Randy Hoback (2011)
  - Provincial Constituency of Carrot River Valley M.L.A.: Fred Bradshaw (2011)
- Elevation: 358 m (1,175 ft)

Population (2016)
  - Total: 973
  - Density: 706.4/km^{2} (1,830/sq mi)
- Time zone: UTC−6 (CST)
- Postal code: S0E 0L0
- Area code: 306
- Highways: Highway 23
- Waterways: Emmons Creek, Carrot River
- Website: Official Website

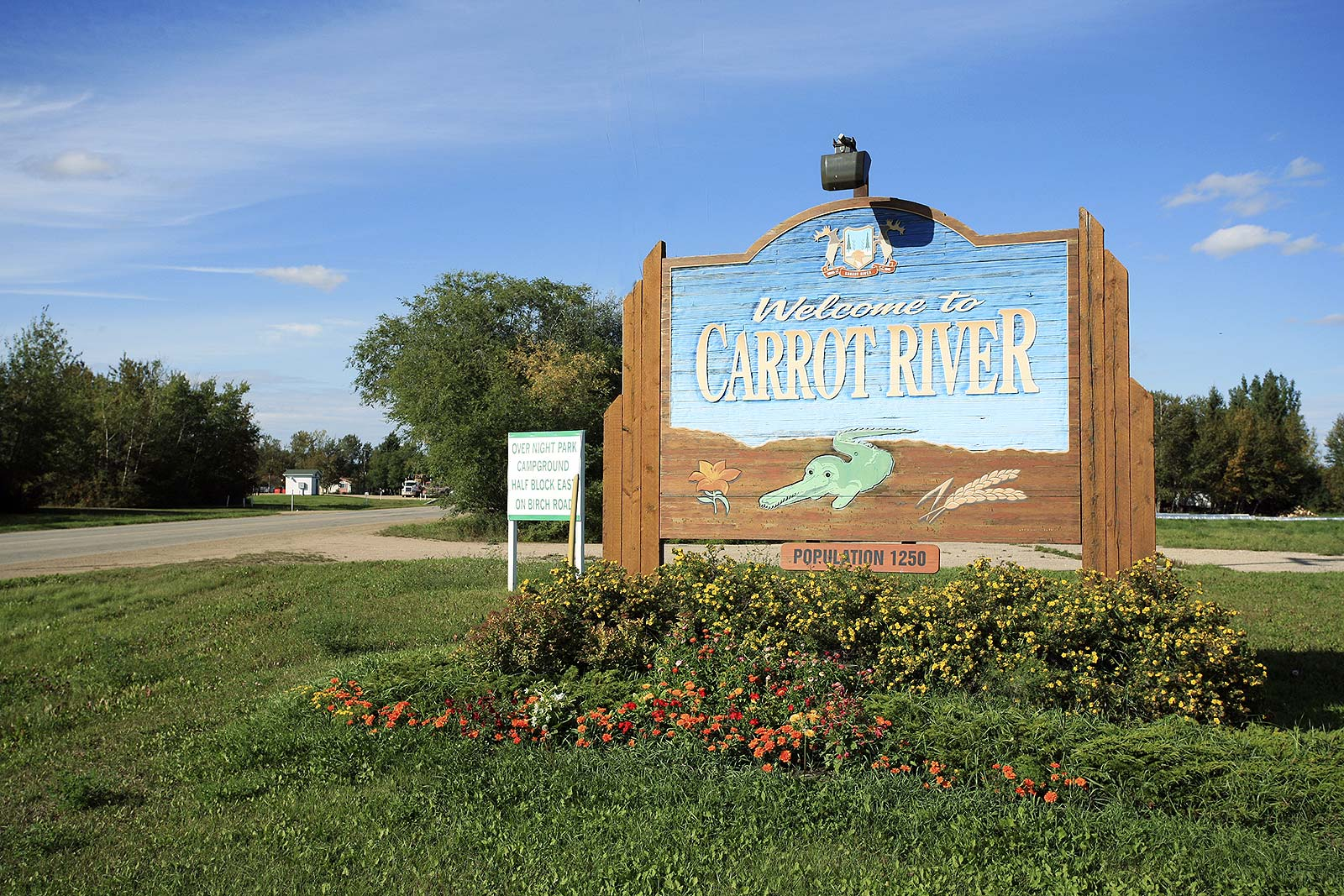
The town sign, featuring "Big Bert", the prehistoric Crocodile found on the banks of the Carrot River, on the edges of town.

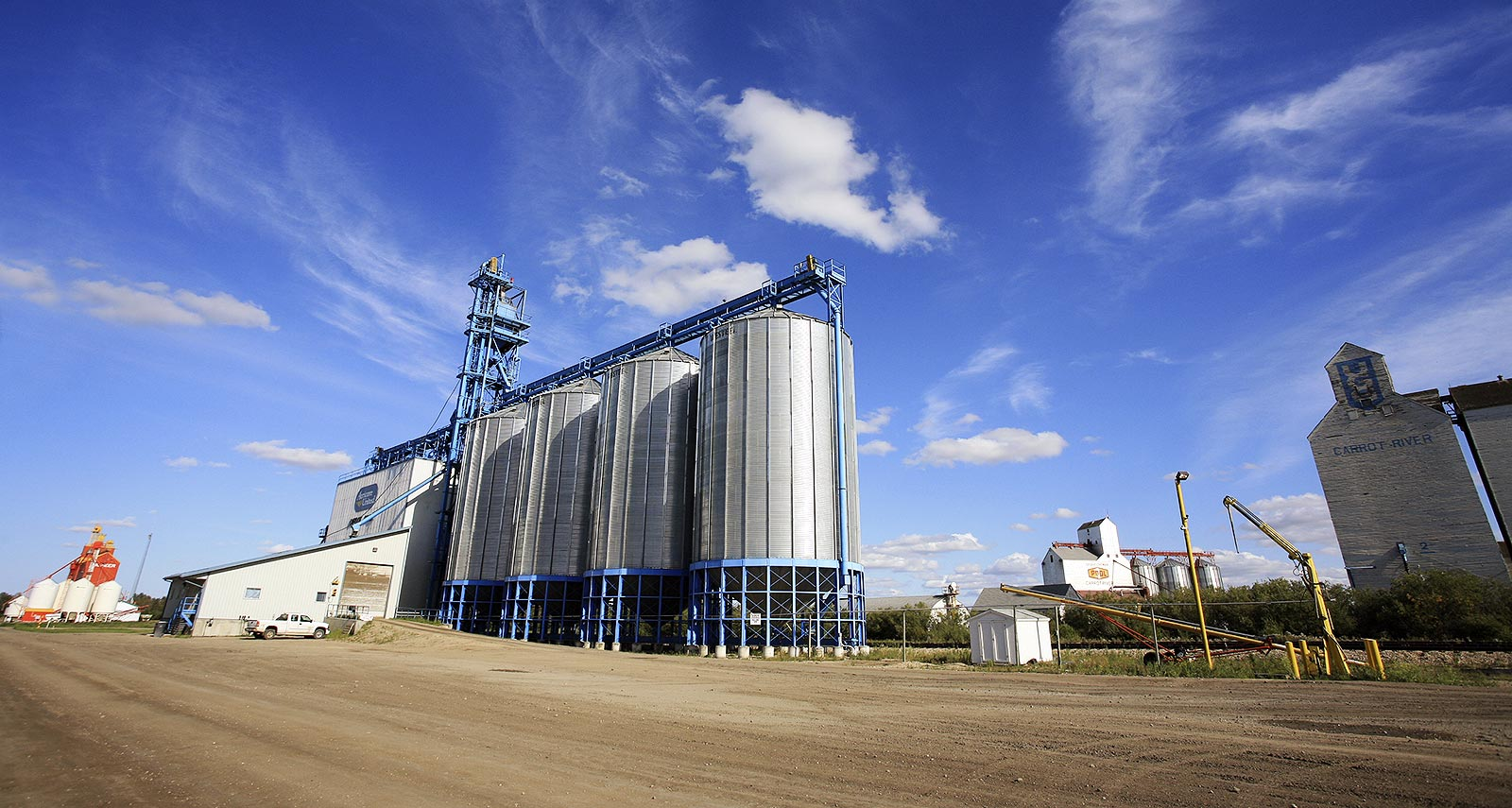
Looking down Railway Avenue. Although some of the original wooden grain elevators have been removed, some remain alongside newer steel structures.

Carrot River is a town located in east-central Saskatchewan (population: 1000) in Canada. The administration office for the Rural Municipality of Moose Range No. 486 is located in Carrot River.

== History ==
The name Carrot River comes from the Plains Cree word for river of wild carrots, referring to the wild carrots growing along the Carrot River. Settlement was slow until the Canadian National Railway came in 1931 bringing farmers from the south. The building of roads and drainage ditches improved land conditions around Carrot River. It became a village in 1941 and incorporated as a town on April 1, 1948.

== Demographics ==
In the 2021 Census of Population conducted by Statistics Canada, Carrot River had a population of 946 living in 426 of its 463 total private dwellings, a change of −2.8% from its 2016 population of 973. With a land area of 1.75 km^{2} (0.68 sq mi), it had a population density of 540.6/km^{2} (1,400.1/sq mi) in 2021.

Canada census – Carrot River community profile

	2021	2011
Population	946 (-2.8% from 2016)	1000 (+6.3% from 2006)
Land area	1.75 km^{2} (0.68 sq mi)	1.42 km^{2} (0.55 sq mi)
Population density	541.4/km^{2} (1,402/sq mi)	706.4/km^{2} (1,830/sq mi)
Median age	46.4 (M: 43.6, F: 48.0)
Private dwellings	463 (total) 426 (occupied)	462 (total)
Median household income	$70,500

References: 2021 2011

== Economy ==
In 1963, the Squaw Rapids Hydro Dam was built 50 kilometres (31 mi) north of Carrot River, forming Tobin Lake, an excellent fishing and recreation area close to the town which attracts tourists from all over the world. It was renamed to E.B. Campbell Hydroelectric Dam in honour of E.B. (Bruce) Campbell, a former SaskPower president, who was the assistant chief engineer during the construction of this station. The dam consists of eight units with a combined generating capacity of 288 net MW.

The Weyerhaeuser sawmill once provided the town's largest source of employment. The operation has recently undergone a $14 million upgrade, although on February 20, 2008, Weyerhaeuser stated the mill would close permanently. In 2011, Edgewood Forest Products, after purchasing the mill, began production of wood for China.

Premier Sask Inc. harvests peat, a decayed matter and the precursor to coal and has a packing and shipping plant at Carrot River. Expanding markets for peat have allowed the Carrot River plant to expand. Premier Sask Inc. ships approximately 1.6 million cubic foot bales per year.

== Attractions ==
- Pasquia Regional Park is less than 10 kilometres (6.2 mi) south of town.
- Pasquia Park Golf Club is at Pasquia Regional Park.
- The Dickson Hardie Interpretive Centre at Pasquia Regional Park is home to "Big Bert", the remains of a 92-million-year-old Terminonaris robusta crocodile, found near Pasquia Park on the shores of the Carrot River. These were the first such remains to be found in North America.
- To the north of Carrot River is Tobin Lake, a top fishing and recreation lake created by the E.B. Campbell Hydroelectric Station. Carrot River provides one of the few accesses to Tobin Lake and its many boat launches and beaches, as well as being the closest community to the hydroelectric station.

== Sports ==
The town is also the home of the Carrot River Outback Thunder Junior B Hockey Team. Games located in Carrot River draw crowds of 100-200, and play-off games draw crowds of 300-500.

== See also ==
- List of communities in Saskatchewan
