= E.B. Campbell Hydroelectric Station =

Hydroelectric station and dam in Saskatchewan, Canada

E.B. Campbell Dam
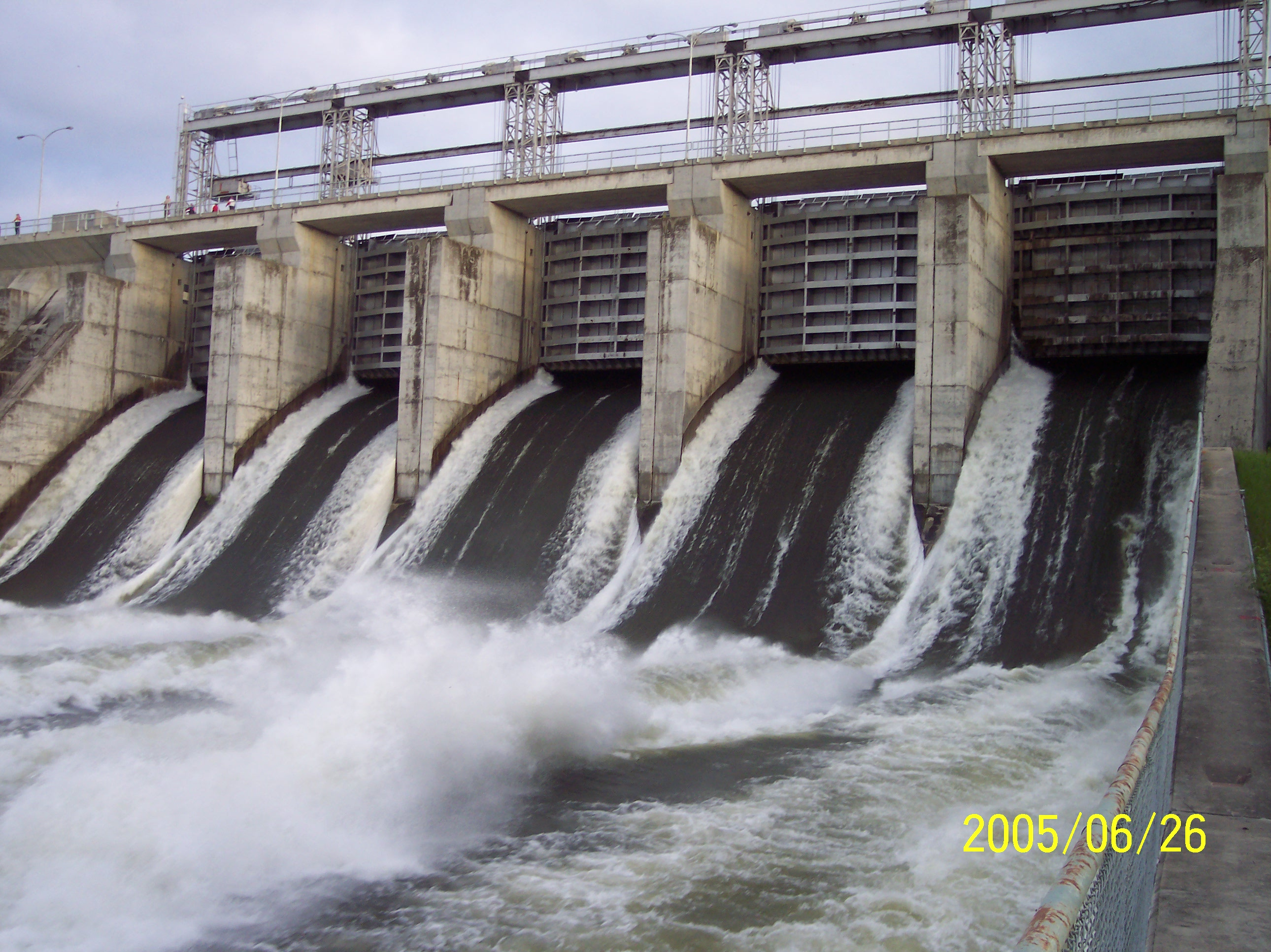
- Spillway of E.B. Campbell Dam while Spilling
- Interactive map of E.B. Campbell Dam
- Official name: E.B. Campbell
- Location: Moose Range No. 486, Saskatchewan
- Coordinates: 53°41′19″N 103°20′50″W
- Opening date: 1963
- Owner: SaskPower
- Operator: SaskPower

Dam and spillways
- Type of dam: Embankment dam
- Height: 33.5 metres (110 ft)
- Length: 722 metres (2,369 ft)
- Spillway capacity: 5,660 cubic metres (200,000 cu ft) per second

Reservoir
- Creates: Tobin Lake
- Total capacity: 2,200,000,000 cubic metres (1,800,000 acre⋅ft)
- Maximum length: 74 kilometres (46 mi)
- Maximum water depth: 26 metres (85 ft)

Power Station
- Commission date: 1963
- Turbines: 8
- Installed capacity: 288 MW
- Annual generation: 900 Million KWH

E.B. Campbell Hydroelectric Station is a hydroelectric station on the Saskatchewan River owned by SaskPower, located near Carrot River, Saskatchewan, Canada. The dam created the artificial Tobin Lake. The station is named after Bruce Campbell, a former president of SaskPower who was also the assistant chief engineer during the construction of the station. Until 1988, it was named Squaw Rapids Dam.

The dam altered water levels in the Saskatchewan River, which made the area uninhabitable for a lot of animals. The impact on fishers and trappers was acknowledged in 1989 with a payment of 15 million dollars. The environmental impact of the dam and power station continues however.

== Description ==
The E.B. Campbell Hydroelectric Station consists of:

- six 32 net MW unit (commissioned in 1963 to 1964)
- two 42 net MW units (commissioned in 1966)

E.B. Campbell Hydroelectric Station
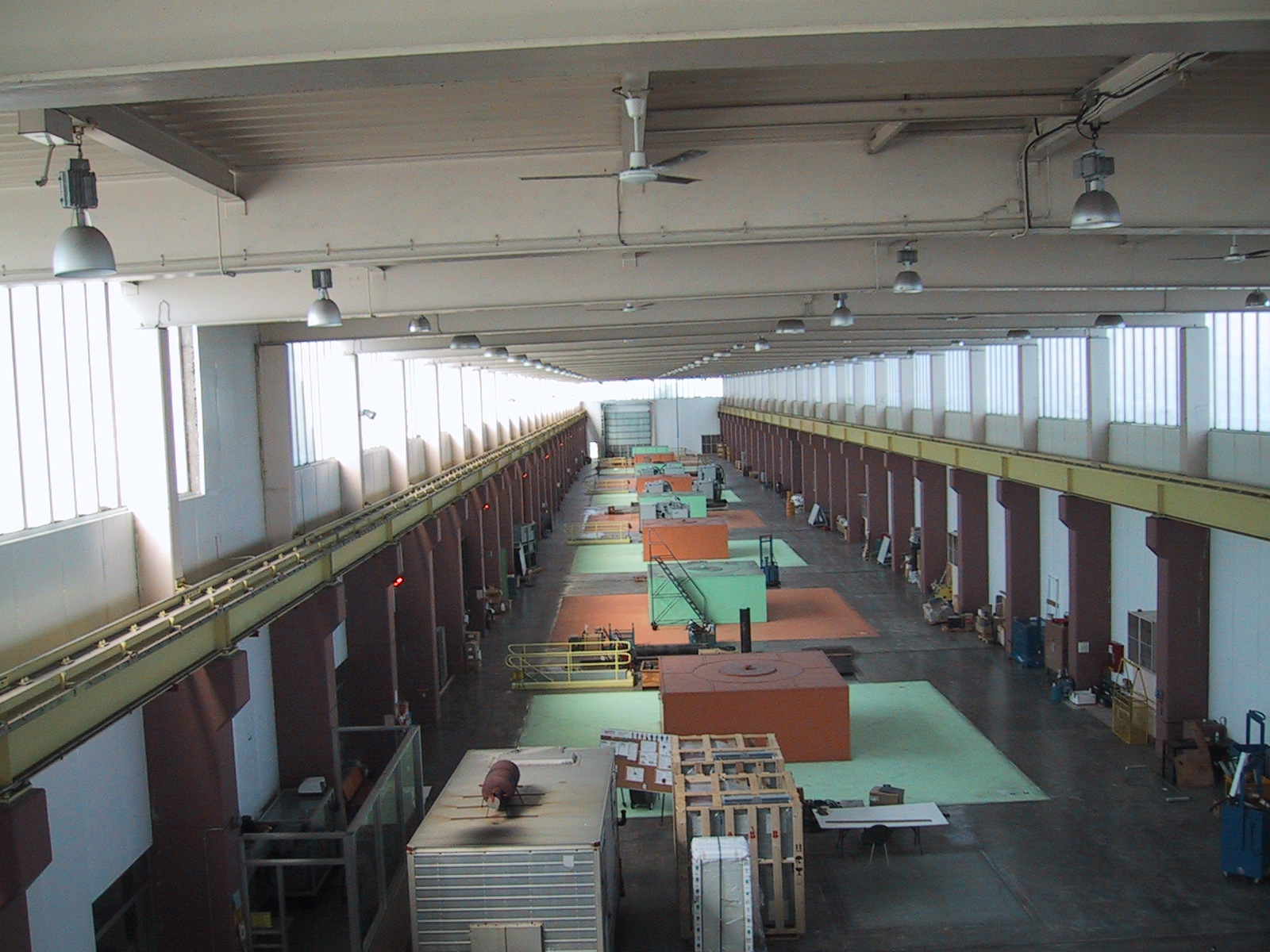
- Country: Canada
- Location: Moose Range No. 486, near Carrot River, Saskatchewan
- Coordinates: 53°41′19″N 103°20′50″W

== See also ==
- SaskPower
- List of dams in Saskatchewan
