= Nipawin =

Town in Saskatchewan, Canada

- Town
- Town of Nipawin
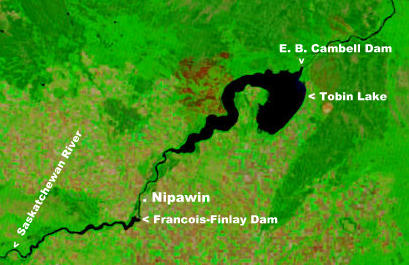
- NASA satellite image of Tobin Lake

- Location of Nipawin Nipawin (Canada)
- Coordinates: 53°21′26″N 104°01′01″W
- Country: Canada
- Province: Saskatchewan
- Census division: No. 14
- Rural municipality: Nipawin No. 487
- Settled: 1910
- Incorporated (town): 1937

Government
  - Mayor: Marlon Zacharias

Area
  - Total: 8.71 km^{2} (3.36 sq mi)

Population (2016)
  - Total: 4,401
  - Density: 505/km^{2} (1,310/sq mi)
- Time zone: UTC−06:00 (CST)
- Postal code: S0E 1E0
- Area code: 306
- Waterways: Saskatchewan River
- Website: www.nipawin.com

Nipawin (/ˈnɪpəwɪn/) is a town in Saskatchewan, Canada, on the Saskatchewan River portion of Tobin Lake. The town lies between Codette Lake, created by the Francois-Finlay Dam (built in 1986) and Tobin Lake, created by the E.B. Campbell Dam built in 1963, renamed from Squaw Rapids. The construction of Francois-Finlay Dam earned Nipawin the nickname the "Town of Two Lakes".

Nipawin is bordered by the Rural Municipality of Nipawin No. 487 and the Rural Municipality of Torch River No. 488 (the latter across the Saskatchewan River).

Highway 35 and Highway 55 intersect in Nipawin. The Nipawin Airport and the Nipawin Water Aerodrome also serve the community.

Nipawin is a Cree word meaning "stand up" which referred to a low-lying area along the river now flooded by Codette Lake where First Nations women and children would camp and wait for the men to arrive.

== History ==
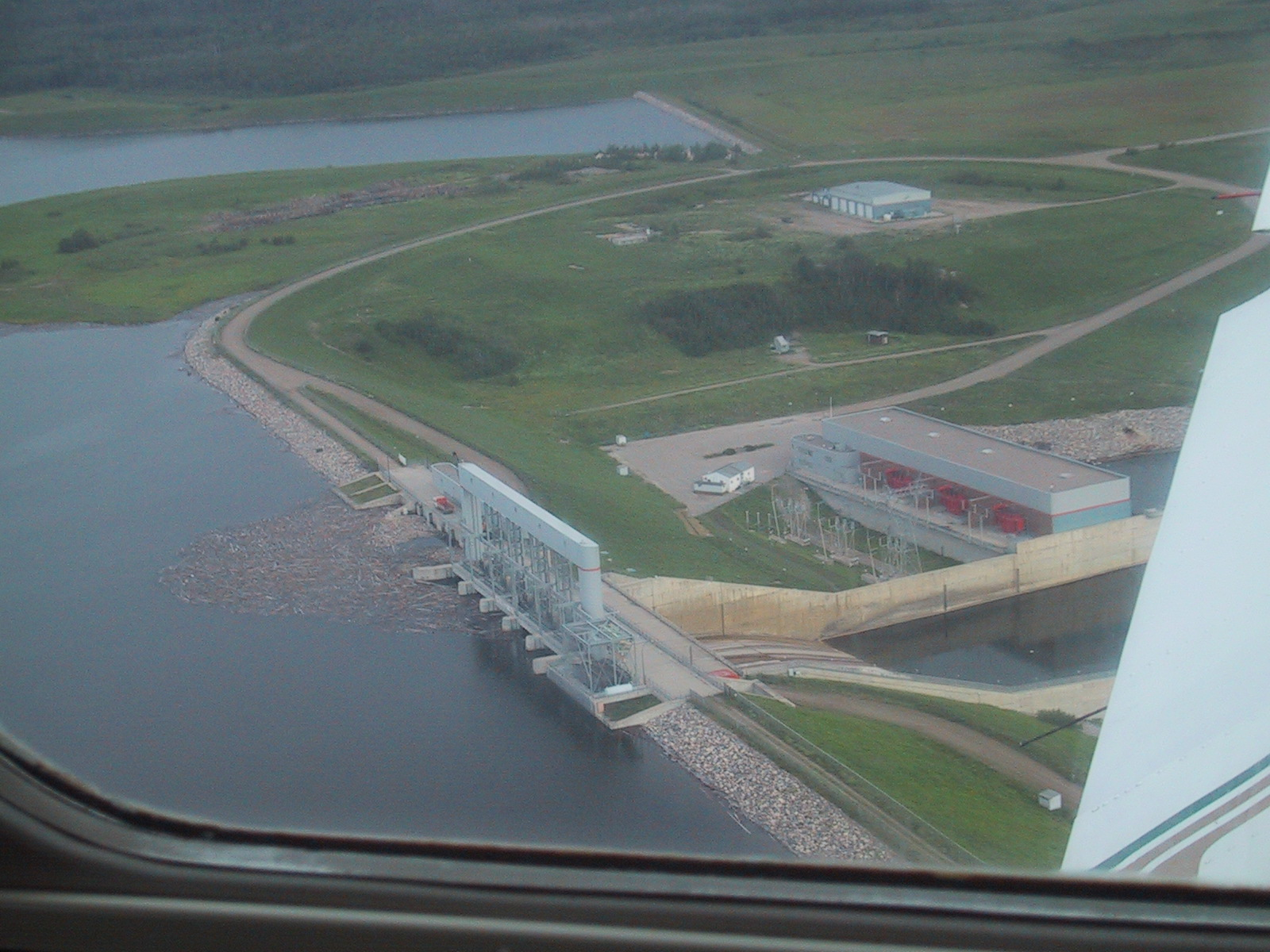
Francois Finlay dam and SaskPower Nipawin Hydroelectric Station

The first permanent settlement of Nipawin occurred in 1910 with the establishment of a trading post. In 1924 a branch-line of the Canadian Pacific Railway passed nearby, crossing the North Saskatchewan River over the Crooked Bridge, and the settlement was moved, building by building, to its current location alongside the railway line.

The Nipawin Historical Society's publication, Bridging the years : Nipawin, Saskatchewan, published in 1988, presents the settlement's early history.

=== Exploration and Fur trade ===
In 1751, a group of New France soldiers commanded by Joseph Boucher de Niverville may have built a short-lived fort, Fort La Jonquière, near the site of Nipawin.

Several fur trading posts may have operated at various times in the area, but they are poorly documented. In 1763 Joseph Smith reached the area from York Factory. In 1768 James Finlay from Montreal built a post. François le Blanc, known as "Saswe", had a post by that year. In 1790 William Thorburn built there then moved to Hungry Hall the following year.

In 1795 two posts operated in the area, one run by A. N. McLeod for the North West Company and another run by James Porter working for David Grant.

=== Recent history ===
On April 18, 2008, a downtown meat shop exploded, destroying three buildings as well as damaging several more. The explosion killed two and injured five. The explosion is suspected to have been caused by a backhoe that snagged and sheared a natural gas riser from the main line. The explosion prompted the implementation of a state of emergency by the mayor. The explosion received extensive national news coverage.

== Demographics ==
In the 2021 Census of Population conducted by Statistics Canada, Nipawin had a population of 4,570 living in 1,921 of its 2,091 total private dwellings, a change of 3.8% from its 2016 population of 4,401. With a land area of 8.93 km^{2} (3.45 sq mi), it had a population density of 511.8/km^{2} (1,325.4/sq mi) in 2021.

Canada census – Nipawin community profile

	2021	2016	2011
Population	4,570 (+3.8% from 2016)	4,401 (+3.2% from 2011)	4,265 (+4.6% from 2006)
Land area	8.93 km^{2} (3.45 sq mi)	8.71 km^{2} (3.36 sq mi)	8.71 km^{2} (3.36 sq mi)
Population density	512/km^{2} (1,330/sq mi)	505.0/km^{2} (1,308/sq mi)	489.4/km^{2} (1,268/sq mi)
Median age	41.2 (M: 39.2, F: 43.2)		43.1 (M: 40.0, F: 45.5)
Private dwellings	1,920 (total)	2,042 (total)	1,977 (total)
Median household income

References: 2021 2016 2011

== Climate ==
Nipawin Experiences a Humid continental climate (Koppen: Dfb) bordering on a subarctic climate (Dfc), with long, extremely cold winters and short, warm summers. The highest temperature ever recorded in Nipawin was 42.2 °C (108 °F) on July 19, 1941. The coldest temperature ever recorded was −48.3 °C (−55 °F) on January 8, 1930.

Climate data for Nipawin Airport, 1981–2010 normals, extremes 1927–present (Note: Climate data was recorded at Nipawin from April 1927 to March 1975 and at Nipawin Airport from August 1973 to present.)
Month	Jan	Feb	Mar	Apr	May	Jun	Jul	Aug	Sep	Oct	Nov	Dec	Year
Record high °C (°F)	11.1 (52.0)	11.1 (52.0)	16.8 (62.2)	31.1 (88.0)	36.7 (98.1)	38.2 (100.8)	42.2 (108.0)	37.2 (99.0)	37.2 (99.0)	31.1 (88.0)	17.0 (62.6)	8.0 (46.4)	42.2 (108.0)
Mean daily maximum °C (°F)	−13.3 (8.1)	−9.1 (15.6)	−2.2 (28.0)	8.5 (47.3)	17.2 (63.0)	21.6 (70.9)	23.9 (75.0)	23.7 (74.7)	17.0 (62.6)	8.3 (46.9)	−3.3 (26.1)	−10.9 (12.4)	6.8 (44.2)
Daily mean °C (°F)	−18.7 (−1.7)	−14.7 (5.5)	−7.9 (17.8)	2.6 (36.7)	10.1 (50.2)	15.2 (59.4)	17.6 (63.7)	16.8 (62.2)	10.6 (51.1)	2.7 (36.9)	−7.8 (18.0)	−16 (3)	0.9 (33.6)
Mean daily minimum °C (°F)	−24.2 (−11.6)	−20.3 (−4.5)	−13.5 (7.7)	−3.4 (25.9)	2.9 (37.2)	8.7 (47.7)	11.2 (52.2)	9.7 (49.5)	4.2 (39.6)	−2.9 (26.8)	−12.2 (10.0)	−21 (−6)	−5.1 (22.8)
Record low °C (°F)	−48.3 (−54.9)	−45 (−49)	−40.2 (−40.4)	−33.6 (−28.5)	−11.9 (10.6)	−7.8 (18.0)	−1.1 (30.0)	−1.7 (28.9)	−10 (14)	−24.4 (−11.9)	−37.4 (−35.3)	−47.2 (−53.0)	−48.3 (−54.9)
Average precipitation mm (inches)	15.2 (0.60)	11.6 (0.46)	14.8 (0.58)	25.2 (0.99)	43.3 (1.70)	74.4 (2.93)	82.7 (3.26)	57.2 (2.25)	40.8 (1.61)	27.7 (1.09)	16.1 (0.63)	18.2 (0.72)	427.3 (16.82)
Average rainfall mm (inches)	0.4 (0.02)	0.6 (0.02)	1.6 (0.06)	12.7 (0.50)	40.6 (1.60)	74.3 (2.93)	82.7 (3.26)	57.2 (2.25)	39.4 (1.55)	14.8 (0.58)	2.0 (0.08)	0.5 (0.02)	326.8 (12.87)
Average snowfall cm (inches)	22.3 (8.8)	16.8 (6.6)	17.1 (6.7)	14.9 (5.9)	2.9 (1.1)	0.1 (0.0)	0.0 (0.0)	0.0 (0.0)	1.4 (0.6)	14.9 (5.9)	19.3 (7.6)	24.7 (9.7)	134.4 (52.9)
Mean monthly sunshine hours	101.1	128.8	177.8	233.4	267.2	282.2	311.8	281.3	178.0	136.5	88.3	80.0	2,266.3
Percentage possible sunshine	40.1	46.5	48.5	55.7	54.4	55.7	61.2	61.4	46.6	41.5	33.9	33.9	48.3
Source: Environment Canada

== Economy ==
Nipawin is near the Fort à la Corne Provincial Forest, location of the world's largest diamond bearing kimberlites and intensive diamond exploration activity. Other industries in the area include: agriculture, tourism, canola oil processing, honey production, forestry, and commercialization of second-generation biofuels.

== Attractions ==
This resort community has become a destination for fishing, camping, boating, golfing, hunting, and outdoor recreation.

- Nipawin hosts several annual fishing events, including, the Great Northern Pike Festival, a summer-long event offering prizes for catching tagged fish. Other annual fishing events are the Codette Walleye tournament, Ladies Fish for Freedom tournament, Premier's Walleye Cup tournament, and the Vanity Cup Walleye tournament running the last weekend in September and the first week in October.
- Nipawin and District Regional Park is about 2.5 kilometres (1.6 mi) north of town.
- The 18-hole Evergreen Golf Course is north of town at the regional park. It has been rated as one of the top 100 public courses in Canada and one of the top five in Saskatchewan. Annual events held at the Evergreen Golf Club are Bob Dow Memorial Golf Tournament and the Evergreen Classic Golf Tournament along with many other tournaments throughout the golf season.
- Nipawin is along the Trans-Canada Snowmobile Trail. There are many other groomed trails that run around Nipawin along with snowmobile rallies.

== Sports ==
- Curling is also found in Nipawin for the young and old. Nipawin hosts the Ladies, Men's and Seniors Bonspiels and the Evergreen Curling Classic.
- The town is home to the Nipawin Hawks of the Saskatchewan Junior Hockey League.

== Education ==
Nipawin has three public schools: Central Park Elementary School, Wagner Elementary School, and L.P. Miller Comprehensive School.

The town is home to the Nipawin Campus of Cumberland College with 360 students and Nipawin Bible College with 48 students.

== Notable residents ==
- Sharon Butala, novelist
- Dane Byers, NHL hockey player
- Lyndon Byers, retired NHL player for the Boston Bruins
- Greg Classen, retired hockey player who played 90 games in the NHL for the Nashville Predators
- James Archibald Kiteley, provincial politician
- Arthur McKay, painter and professor
- Dave Pagan, professional baseball pitcher

== See also ==
- List of towns in Saskatchewan
- List of place names in Canada of Indigenous origin
