= Saskatchewan Highway 224 =

Provincial highway in Saskatchewan, Canada

Highway 224

Route information
- Maintained by Ministry of Highways and Infrastructure
- Length: 46.0 km (28.6 mi)

Major junctions
- West end: Highway 26 / Highway 954 at Goodsoil
- Highway 950 in Meadow Lake Provincial Park
- East end: Highway 4 / Highway 904 in Meadow Lake Provincial Park north of Dorintosh

Location
- Country: Canada
- Province: Saskatchewan
- Rural municipalities: Beaver River, Meadow Lake

Highway system
- Provincial highways in Saskatchewan
| ← Highway 221 | → Highway 225 |

Highway 224 is a provincial highway in the Canadian province of Saskatchewan. Saskatchewan's 200-series highways primarily service its recreational areas. The highway runs from Highway 26 / Highway 950 to Highway 4 / Highway 904. It is about 46 kilometres (29 mi) long.

Highway 224 is gravelled for its entire length, lies entirely within Meadow Lake Provincial Park, follows the course of the Waterhen River, and provides access to many recreational areas, lakes, and campgrounds. The lakes accessed by the highway include Greig Lake, Rusty Lake, First Mustus Lake, Second Mustus Lake, Kimball Lake, Matheson Lake, Vivian Lake, Peitahigan Lake, and Mistohay Lake.

== Route description ==
Hwy 224 begins in the Rural Municipality of Beaver River No. 622 on the northern boundary of the village of Goodsoil at the junction between Hwy 26 and Hwy 954, with the road continuing south as Hwy 26. It heads north through farmland a few kilometres to enter Meadow Lake Provincial Park, crossing the Waterhen River just west of Lac des Îles and curving eastward at an intersection with Hwy 950. Running parallel to the river, the highway travels woodlands for the next several kilometres, crossing Mistohay Creek via a culvert and travelling along the southern coastline of Mistohay Lake. Winding its way southeast past several campgrounds and Peitahigan Lake, Matheson Lake, Vivian Lake (where it crosses into the Rural Municipality of Meadow Lake No. 588), First and Second Mustus Lakes, and Kimball Lake, where it passes by a subdivision as well as a campground with several amenities. Hwy 224 now crosses over Rusty Creek and traverses some switchbacks as it travels along the coastlines of Rusty Lake and Greig Lake, where it has intersections with an access road to the Waters Edge Eco Lodge as well as Park Street, which leads to the resort village of Greig Lake. After passing through remote woodlands for a few kilometres, the highway comes to an end at the intersection between Hwy 4 and Hwy 904, just metres away from the north bank of the river. The entire length of Hwy 224 is a grave, two-lane highway.

== Major intersections ==
| Rural municipality | Location | km | mi | Destinations | Notes |
|---|---|---|---|---|---|
| Beaver River No. 622 | Goodsoil | 0.0 | 0.0 | Highway 26 south (Main Street N) – Goodsoil, Loon Lake; Highway 954 west – Northern Cross Resort, Christel Beach, Laumans Landing, The Shores, Big Island Cove, Lac des Îles south side | Western terminus; northern terminus of Hwy 26; eastern terminus of Hwy 954; road continues south as Hwy 26 |
| Beaver River No. 622 | Meadow Lake Provincial Park | 3.7– 3.8 | 2.3– 2.4 | Bridge over the Waterhen River | |
| Beaver River No. 622 | Meadow Lake Provincial Park | 3.9 | 2.4 | Meadow Lake Provincial Park Goodsoil entry gate | |
| Beaver River No. 622 | Meadow Lake Provincial Park | 4.3 | 2.7 | Highway 950 west – Murray Doell, Howe Bay, Sandy Beach, Pierceland, Lac des Îles north side | Eastern terminus of Hwy 950 |
| Beaver River No. 622 | Meadow Lake Provincial Park | 15.3 | 9.5 | Mistohay Lake Campground access road | |
| Beaver River No. 622 | Meadow Lake Provincial Park | 25.8 | 16.0 | Matheson Lake Campground access road | |
| Beaver River No. 622 | Meadow Lake Provincial Park | 26.3 | 16.3 | Vivian Lake Campground access road | |
| Meadow Lake No. 588 | Meadow Lake Provincial Park | 28.7 | 17.8 | Second Mustus Lake access road | |
| Meadow Lake No. 588 | Meadow Lake Provincial Park | 32.4 | 20.1 | Kimball Lake Campground access road | |
| Meadow Lake No. 588 | Meadow Lake Provincial Park | 32.5 | 20.2 | Old Hwy 224 – First Mustus Lake boat launch | |
| Meadow Lake No. 588 | Meadow Lake Provincial Park | 33.3 | 20.7 | Bridge over Rusty Creek | |
| Meadow Lake No. 588 | Meadow Lake Provincial Park | 34.5 | 21.4 | Old Hwy 224 – First Mustus Lake campground | |
| Meadow Lake No. 588 | Meadow Lake Provincial Park | 36.1 | 22.4 | Rusty Lake access point | |
| Meadow Lake No. 588 | Meadow Lake Provincial Park | 37.5 | 23.3 | Waters Edge Eco Lodge access road | |
| Meadow Lake No. 588 | Meadow Lake Provincial Park | 41.9 | 26.0 | Park Street – Greig Lake, Greig Lake campground | |
| Meadow Lake No. 588 | Meadow Lake Provincial Park | 46.0 | 28.6 | Highway 4 south – Dorintosh; Highway 904 north – Canoe Lake | Eastern terminus; northern terminus of Hwy 4; southern terminus of Hwy 904 |
1.000 mi = 1.609 km; 1.000 km = 0.621 mi

== See also ==
- Transportation in Saskatchewan
- Roads in Saskatchewan
