= Matheson Lake =

Lake in Saskatchewan, Canada

- Location in Saskatchewan Matheson Lake (Canada)
- Location: Meadow Lake Provincial Park, Saskatchewan
- Coordinates: 54.410201°N 108.938897°W
- Part of: Churchill River drainage basin
- Basin countries: Canada
- Surface area: 330.7 ha (817 acres)
- Max. depth: 15.545 m (51.00 ft)
- Shore length^{1}: 9.73 km (6.05 mi)
- Surface elevation: 475 m (1,558 ft)
- Settlements: None
- ^{1} Shore length is not a well-defined measure.

Matheson Lake is a lake in Meadow Lake Provincial Park in the Canadian Province of Saskatchewan in the boreal forest ecozone of Canada. The lake is located near the centre of the park, north of the Waterhen River, west of Vivian Lake, and south of Peitahigan Lake. Several small streams feed into the lake and the outflow is at the southern shore, which feeds into the Waterhen River, a tributary of Beaver River. The Beaver River, in turn, flows north into Lac Île-à-la-Crosse and the Churchill River, a major tributary in the Hudson Bay drainage basin.

There is a campground at the north-east corner of the lake and both the lake and campground are accessed from Highway 224.

== Recreation ==
Matheson Lake Campground is a first-come-first-serve campsite with 46 non-electric campsites. It is situated on a beach along the lake. The beach is about 100 metres (330 ft) long and has amenities such as a picnic area, boat launch, and a fish cleaning station. A 7.2-kilometre (4.5 mi) long trail starts near the campground and travels around the lake.

About a mile east of Matheson Lake is Vivian Lake. On the west side of Vivian Lake there are eight non-electric campsites that have access to the lake. The campground is also the start of a 2.4-kilometre (1.5 mi) long trail that makes a loop along the lake's northern shore.

== See also ==
- List of lakes of Saskatchewan
- Tourism in Saskatchewan
