= Waterhen Lake (Saskatchewan) =

Lake in Saskatchewan, Canada

- Location of Waterhen Lake in Saskatchewan Waterhen Lake (Canada)
- Location: Saskatchewan
- Coordinates: 54°28′0″N 108°25′3″W
- Part of: Churchill River drainage basin
- Primary inflows: Waterhen River (from Lac des Îles)
- Primary outflows: Waterhen River
- Basin countries: Canada
- Surface area: 10,023.2 ha (24,768 acres)
- Max. depth: 30.5 m (100 ft)
- Shore length^{1}: 461.01 km (286.46 mi)
- Surface elevation: 469 m (1,539 ft)
- Settlements: Waterhen Lake First Nation
- ^{1} Shore length is not a well-defined measure.

Waterhen Lake is a lake in Meadow Lake Provincial Park in the Canadian province of Saskatchewan, located about 40 kilometres (25 mi) north of the city of Meadow Lake. The lake is situated along the course of the Waterhen River in the boreal forest ecozone of Canada.

At just over 10,000 ha (25,000 acres) in size, it is the second largest lake at least partially within Meadow Lake Provincial Park — the largest being Cold Lake at the far western end of the park.

Waterhen Indian Reserve No. 130, the reserve community of the Waterhen Lake First Nation, surrounds most of the eastern portion of the lake and the western half of the lake and the far eastern shore are in Meadow Lake Provincial Park. Highways 904, 941, and 951 provide access to the lake.

== Description ==
Waterhen Lake's primary tributary, the Waterhen River, flows east from Lac des Îles for about 65 km (40 mi) into the southern shore of Waterhen Lake. The Waterhen River then flows out of the lake at the north-east corner in a northeasterly direction for approximately 50 km (31 mi) into Beaver River, which flows into the Churchill River at Lac Île-à-la-Crosse. The Churchill River is a major river in the Hudson Bay drainage basin.

At the point where the Waterhen River flows into Waterhen Lake, it's a shallow, marshy delta with several other smaller lakes in the vicinity, including Niven Lake, which both Matkin and Iskwayach Lakes flow into, and Redmond Lake. Otter Creek, a tributary of Waterhen River, also flows into the delta. at the eastern end, Jarvis Lake opens up into Waterhen Lake. At the northern end of the lake, two notable tributaries flow into the lake in another marshy delta. Flotten River flows in from Flotten Lake and Short Creek drains Nesootao (Twin) Lakes and Little Lake.

== Recreation ==
Situated in a provincial park, there are many recreational opportunities at Waterhen Lake, including boating, camping, fishing, and swimming.

On the western shore of the lake there is South Waterhen Lake, Waterhen Lake Campground, Tawaw Cabins, Tawaw Outfitters, and Miywasin Ota Resort. Tawaw Cabins offers 14 cabins, 27 campsites, showers, washrooms, beach access, boat rentals, and a store at the outfitters. Miywasin Ota Resort also has beach access with rentals, fuel, long term and short term cabin rentals, and a store.

== Fish species ==
Fish commonly found in the lake include the northern pike, walleye, yellow perch, and burbot. There is a custom limit for walleye on the lake of three and only one may be over 55 cm (22 in).

== See also ==
- List of lakes of Saskatchewan
- Tourism in Saskatchewan
