= Kimball Lake =

Lake in Saskatchewan, Canada

- Location in Saskatchewan Kimball Lake (Canada)
- Location: Meadow Lake Provincial Park, Saskatchewan
- Coordinates: 54.4081°N 108.8266°W
- Part of: Churchill River drainage basin
- Basin countries: Canada
- Surface area: 290 ha (720 acres)
- Max. depth: 11 m (36 ft)
- Shore length^{1}: 7.7 km (4.8 mi)
- Surface elevation: 472 m (1,549 ft)
- Settlements: None
- ^{1} Shore length is not a well-defined measure.

Kimball Lake is a lake in Meadow Lake Provincial Park in Saskatchewan, Canada. The lake is surrounded by boreal forest near the centre of the park. It is north of the Waterhen River and Little Raspberry Lake and south of First Mustus Lake. Rusty and Greig Lakes are to the east. Several small streams feed into the lake and the outflow is at the southern shore, which feeds into the Waterhen River, a tributary of Beaver River. The Beaver River, in turn, flows north into Lac Île-à-la-Crosse and the Churchill River. The Churchill River flows east into the Hudson Bay.

The lake is accessed from Highway 224, which runs along its northern shore. Also on the northern shore is a small subdivision of cabins, and along the eastern part of the lake is Kimball Lake Beach and Campground.

== Recreation ==
Kimball Lake Campground has 190 individual campsites as well as group sites with access to a one-kilometre long sandy beach. There are full-service and electric-only campsites, public washrooms, showers, and laundry available, as well as a store, playground, picnic area, and sani-dump.

A nearly 10-kilometre long interpretive trail heads south from the campground and goes around Little Raspberry Lake.

== Fish species ==
Fish commonly found in Kimball Lake include walleye, northern pike, and tiger trout.

== See also ==
- List of lakes of Saskatchewan
- Tourism in Saskatchewan
