= Jeannette Lake =

Lake in Saskatchewan, Canada

- Location in Saskatchewan Jeannette Lake (Canada)
- Location: Meadow Lake Provincial Park, Saskatchewan
- Coordinates: 54.5518°N 108.5466°W
- Part of: Churchill River drainage basin
- Basin countries: Canada
- Surface area: 384.9 ha (951 acres)
- Max. depth: 33 m (108 ft)
- Shore length^{1}: 12.9 km (8.0 mi)
- Surface elevation: 481 m (1,578 ft)
- Settlements: None
- ^{1} Shore length is not a well-defined measure.

Jeannette Lake is a small lake located within Meadow Lake Provincial Park in the Canadian province of Saskatchewan. Two summer camps are located on the lake's shore, including Camp Oshkidee on the northern shore and Bethel Gospel Camp on the southern shore. The lake can be accessed from Highway 904. Dorintosh is the closest town to the lake.

== Fish species ==
Fish species found in Jeanette Lake include northern pike and walleye.

== See also ==
- List of lakes of Saskatchewan
- Tourism in Saskatchewan
