= Mistohay Lake =

Lake in Saskatchewan, Canada

- Location in Saskatchewan Mistohay Lake (Canada)
- Location: Meadow Lake Provincial Park, Saskatchewan
- Coordinates: 54°27′18″N 109°05′42″W
- Part of: Churchill River drainage basin
- River sources: Mostoos Hills
- Basin countries: Canada
- Surface area: 600 ha (1,500 acres)
- Max. depth: 12 m (39 ft)
- Shore length^{1}: 16 km (9.9 mi)
- Surface elevation: 533 m (1,749 ft)
- Settlements: None
- ^{1} Shore length is not a well-defined measure.

Mistohay Lake is a lake in Meadow Lake Provincial Park in the Canadian Province of Saskatchewan in the boreal forest ecozone of Canada. The lake is part of the Waterhen River drainage basin. The Waterhen River is a tributary of the Beaver River, which flows north into Lac Île-à-la-Crosse and the Churchill River.

Several streams feed into Mistohay Lake, including ones that drain the southern slopes of the Mostoos Hills. Mistohay Creek, the lake's outflow, is located at the western end of the lake and it flows south-west into the Waterhen River. Shortly after Mistohay Creek leaves Mistohay Lake, it is met by another creek that drains nearby de Balinhard Lake.

Highway 224 runs along the southern shore of the lake and provides access to the lake and the campground.

== Recreation ==
The Mistohay Lake Campground is located on the southern shore near the eastern end of Mistohay Lake and has 20 non-electric campsites. The campground is one of the most popular campgrounds in Meadow Lake Provincial Park and has a boat launch, children's playground, and public washrooms.

A 7.5-kilometre long trail leads south from Mistohay Campground to link up with the Boreal Trail, which is a year-round 135-kilometre long trail that traverses the length of the park. It mostly follows the courses of the Cold and Waterhen Rivers from Cold Lake to Greig Lake. A 13.2-kilometre round-trip trail branches off from the Boreal Trail from just east of Lac des Îles and heads north-east to nearby de Balinhard Lake.

== Fish species ==
Fish species found in Mistohay Lake include walleye, cisco, longnose sucker, white sucker, yellow perch, lake whitefish, and northern pike.

== See also ==
- List of lakes of Saskatchewan
- Tourism in Saskatchewan
