= Little Raspberry Lake =

Lake in Saskatchewan, Canada

- Location in Saskatchewan Little Raspberry Lake (Canada)
- Location: Meadow Lake Provincial Park, Saskatchewan
- Coordinates: 54.3989°N 108.8094°W
- Part of: Churchill River drainage basin
- Basin countries: Canada
- Max. length: 1.6 km (1 mi)
- Max. width: 600 m (2,000 ft)
- Surface area: 80 ha (200 acres)
- Max. depth: 17.7 m (58 ft)
- Shore length^{1}: 4.1 km (2.5 mi)
- Surface elevation: 471 m (1,545 ft)
- Settlements: None
- ^{1} Shore length is not a well-defined measure.

Little Raspberry Lake is a lake in the Canadian province of Saskatchewan. It is situated in Meadow Lake Provincial Park, just south of Kimball Lake and north of Waterhen River. The lake is within the boreal forest surrounded by jack pine and white birch. Access is from a gravel road that begins at Kimball Lake Campground and via a series of hiking trails.

There are about 10 kilometres (6.2 mi) of hiking trails that connect from Kimball Lake that loop around Little Raspberry Lake. The gravel road that leads in from Kimball Lake terminates at Little Raspberry Lake's eastern end. Highway 224 is the nearest highway.

== Fish species ==
Fish commonly found in Little Raspberry Lake include rainbow trout, tiger trout, splake, and brown trout. In alternating years, the lake is stocked with brown trout and splake. In years past, it was stocked with rainbow trout and tiger trout.

== See also ==
- List of lakes of Saskatchewan
