= Greig Lake =

Greig Lake may refer to:

- Greig Lake (Saskatchewan), a lake in Canada
- Greig Lake, Saskatchewan, a resort village on Greig Lake
