= Pagan Lake =

Lake in Saskatchewan, Canada

- Location in Saskatchewan Pagan Lake (Canada)
- Location: RM of Meadow Lake No. 588, Saskatchewan
- Coordinates: 54.3206°N 108.2820°W
- Part of: Churchill River drainage basin
- Primary outflows: Herlen River
- Basin countries: Canada
- Surface area: 317.3 ha (784 acres)
- Max. depth: 4.3 m (14 ft)
- Shore length^{1}: 9.2 km (5.7 mi)
- Surface elevation: 457 m (1,499 ft)
- Settlements: None
- ^{1} Shore length is not a well-defined measure.

Pagan Lake is a lake in the Canadian province of Saskatchewan in the Rural Municipality of Meadow Lake No. 588, about 30 kilometres (19 mi) north of the city of Meadow Lake. The lake is in the Mid-boreal Upland ecozone and is situated in a landscape of boreal forest and muskeg. The lake's outflow is Herlen River, which is a tributary of the Beaver River. On the west side of the lake is a Provincial recreation site. Access is from Highway 903.

== Pagan Lake Recreation Site ==
Pagan Lake Recreation Site (54.3186°N 108.2951°W) is a provincially-run park on the west side of Pagan Lake. It has a small campground, boat launch, and picnic area. The park provides access to the lake for fishing and other water sports.

== Fish species ==
Fish commonly found in Pagan Lake include northern pike, walleye, and yellow perch.

== See also ==
- List of lakes of Saskatchewan
- Tourism in Saskatchewan
