= Flotten Lake =

Lake in Saskatchewan, Canada

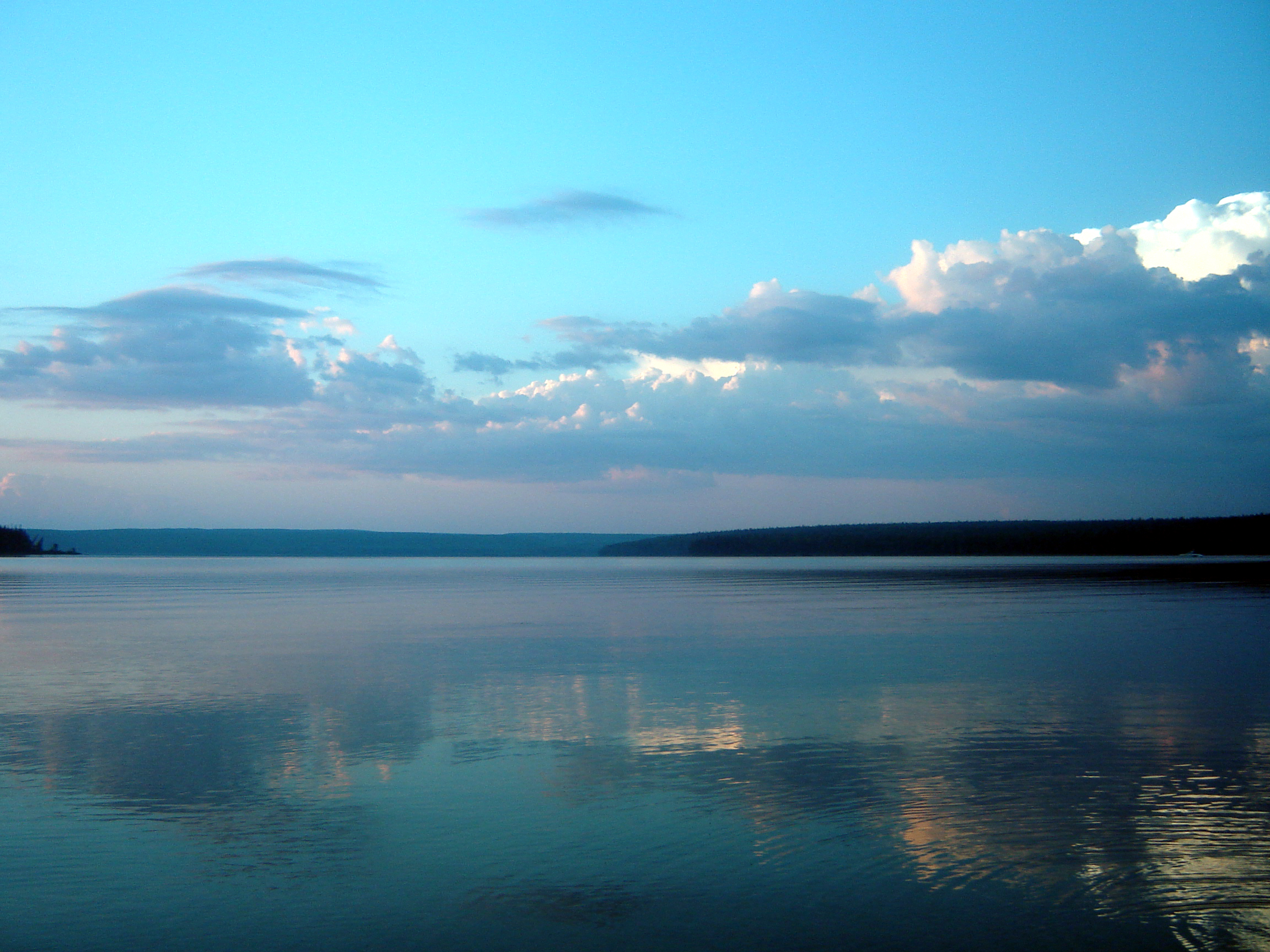
- Flotten Lake at dusk

- Location in Saskatchewan Flotten Lake (Canada)
- Location: Meadow Lake Provincial Park, Saskatchewan
- Coordinates: 54.6145°N 108.5306°W
- Part of: Churchill River drainage basin
- River sources: Mostoos Hills
- Primary outflows: Flotten River
- Basin countries: Canada
- Max. length: 11 km (6.8 mi)
- Max. width: 4 km (2.5 mi)
- Surface area: 2,396.6 ha (5,922 acres)
- Max. depth: 15 m (49 ft)
- Shore length^{1}: 29.47 km (18.31 mi)
- Surface elevation: 485 m (1,591 ft)
- Islands: Clay Island
- Settlements: None
- ^{1} Shore length is not a well-defined measure.

Flotten Lake is a lake in Meadow Lake Provincial Park in the Canadian Province of Saskatchewan. While the lake has one outflow, Flotten River, there are several small inflow creeks, including Fleury Creek, Young Creek, Ross Creek, Moloney Creek, and Salt Creek. Flotten River exits the lake at the south end and flows south into Waterhen Lake, which is the source of the Waterhen River.

The lake features two campgrounds on its eastern shore, North Flotten and South Flotten Campgrounds, totalling about 25 campsites. Also on the eastern shore is Flotten Lake Adventures. The lake is in an ecozone called the boreal forest.

The lake was named for Peter Flotten, a veteran of the Boer War and the First World War, who worked as a government surveyor in the area.

== Flotten Lake Adventures ==
Flotten Lake Adventures is a resort that offers hunting, fishing, and camping opportunities at Flotten Lake in Meadow Lake Provincial Park. The resort is located off Highway 904 on the south-east corner of the lake. The resort offers modern cabins for rent that have amenities including private bathrooms, showers, Wi-Fi, Satellite TV, and a well-equipped kitchen. Individual campsites are also located at the resort that have electrical hookups, Wi-Fi, running water, and a central shower house with flush toilets.

== Fishing ==
Fish commonly found in Flotten Lake include northern pike and walleye.

== See also ==
- List of lakes of Saskatchewan
- Tourism in Saskatchewan
