= Saskatchewan Highway 904 =

Provincial highway in Saskatchewan, Canada

Highway 904

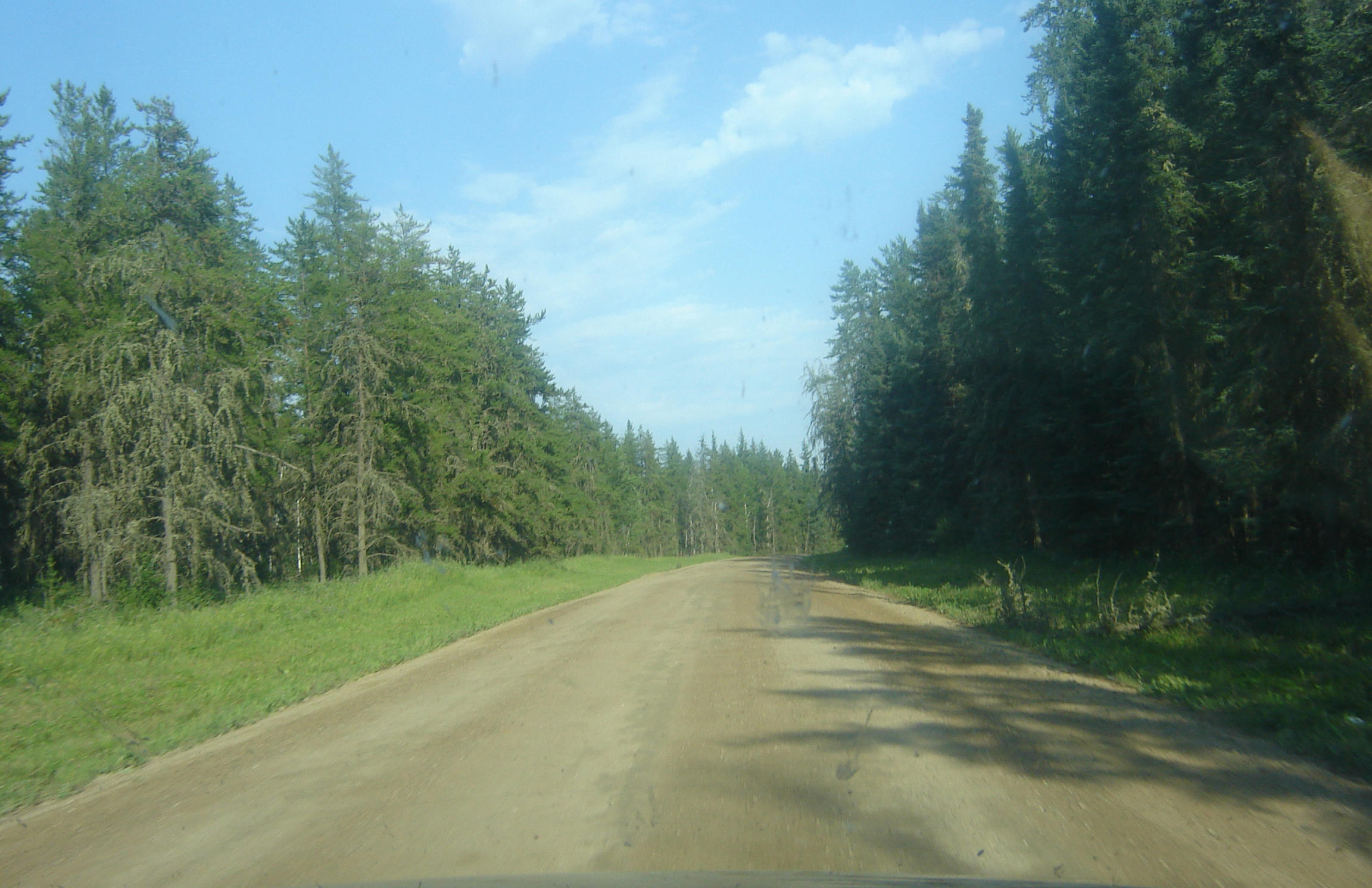
- Hwy 904 in Meadow Lake Provincial Park

Route information
- Maintained by Ministry of Highways and Infrastructure
- Length: 72.1 km (44.8 mi)
- History: Formerly Highway 104

Major junctions
- South end: Highway 4 / Highway 224 in Meadow Lake Provincial Park
- Highway 951
- North end: Highway 903 just west of Wepuskow Sahgaiechan Indian reserve

Location
- Country: Canada
- Province: Saskatchewan
- Rural municipalities: Meadow Lake No. 588

Highway system
- Provincial highways in Saskatchewan
← Highway 903	→ Highway 905

Highway 904 is a provincial highway in the north-west region of Saskatchewan, Canada. The highway travels from the Highway 4 / Highway 224 intersection in Meadow Lake Provincial Park north to Highway 903 just west of Wepuskow Sahgaiechan Indian reserve and Keeley Lake. It is about 72 kilometres (45 mi) long.

Highway 904 was once Highway 104, a northerly extension of Highway 4; it was replaced in the early 1980s.

== Route description ==
In Meadow Lake Provincial Park, Highway 904 begins at the northern terminus of Highway 4. It heads generally north through the park where it provides access to the amenities of the western shore of Waterhen Lake (including South Waterhen Lake, Miywasin Ota Resort, and Waterhen Lake Campground), intersects Highways 951 and 941, and runs along the eastern shore of Flotten Lake. North of the park, it runs along the eastern slopes of the Mostoos Hills. From the hills, Highway 904 turns east where it terminates at Highway 903. From its terminus, a road continues east to Keeley Lake where it services the Wepuskow Sahgaiechan Indian reserve and the community of Keeley Lake.

== See also ==
- Roads in Saskatchewan
- Transportation in Saskatchewan
