= Saskatchewan Highway 903 =

Provincial highway in Saskatchewan, Canada

Highway 903

Route information
- Maintained by Ministry of Highways and Infrastructure
- Length: 179 km (111 mi)

Major junctions
- South end: Highway 55 near Meadow Lake
- Highway 941; Highway 904; Highway 965
- North end: Cole Bay

Location
- Country: Canada
- Province: Saskatchewan
- Rural municipalities: Meadow Lake No. 588

Highway system
- Provincial highways in Saskatchewan
← Highway 799	→ Highway 904

Highway 903 is a provincial highway in the north-west region of Saskatchewan, Canada. It begins at Highway 55 in RM of Meadow Lake No. 588, east of the town of Meadow Lake, and heads north past Waterhen Lake, Keeley Lake, Upper Cumins Lake, and Canoe Lake en route to Vermette Lake. It is about 179 kilometres (111 mi) long.

Along Highway 903's route, it intersects Highways 941, 904, and 965 (at Cole Bay, on the south side of Canoe Lake) and provides access to Meadow Lake Provincial Park, Gladue Lake Indian reserve, Waterhen Indian reserve, Keeley Lake, and Canoe Lake Recreation Site.

== See also ==
- Roads in Saskatchewan
- Transportation in Saskatchewan
