= Cole Bay =

Hamlet in Saskatchewan, Canada

Coordinates: 55°5′54″N 108°19′13″W

Location of Cole Bay in Saskatchewan

Cole Bay is a northern hamlet in Saskatchewan's northern boreal forest. It is located on the southern shore of Canoe Lake. The population in the Canada Census of 2011 was 230, an increase of 47.4% over 156 in 2006.

Cole Bay shares its eastern border with Canoe Narrows and is near Jans Bay, which is also located on Canoe Lake.

Highway 965 accesses the community. It intersects Highway 155 at its eastern end and Highway 903 at its western end.

== Demographics ==
In the 2021 Census of Population conducted by Statistics Canada, Cole Bay had a population of 194 living in 59 of its 66 total private dwellings, a change of 14.1% from its 2016 population of 170. With a land area of 4.86 km^{2} (1.88 sq mi), it had a population density of 39.9/km^{2} (103.4/sq mi) in 2021.

== See also ==
- List of communities in Saskatchewan
