= Keeley Lake (Saskatchewan) =

Lake in Saskatchewan, Canada

- Location in Saskatchewan Keeley Lake (Canada)
- Location: Northern Administration District, Saskatchewan
- Coordinates: 54.9001°N 108.1340°W
- Part of: Churchill River drainage basin
- Primary inflows: Broad Creek
- Primary outflows: Keeley River
- Basin countries: Canada
- Max. length: 14 km (8.7 mi)
- Max. width: 10 km (6.2 mi)
- Surface area: 9,321 ha (23,030 acres)
- Max. depth: 15 m (49 ft)
- Shore length^{1}: 46 km (29 mi)
- Surface elevation: 451 m (1,480 ft)
- Settlements: Keeley Lake
- ^{1} Shore length is not a well-defined measure.

Keeley Lake is a lake in Northern Saskatchewan, Canada. It is within the Churchill River drainage basin about 88 kilometres (55 mi) north-northeast of the city of Meadow Lake. At the southern end of the lake is the small hamlet of Keeley Lake. The community has an outfitters and lake access. On the western shore is Wepuskow Sahgaiechan 165D Indian reserve. Access to the lake and its amenities is from a gravel road leading off from the intersection of Highway 903 and Highway 904.

== Description ==
Keeley Lake is a large, round lake with two bays — Marshy and Wiggins — situated in the boreal forest. It covers an area of 9,321 hectares (23,030 acres) and has a shoreline measuring 46 kilometres (29 mi). At about 15 metres (49 ft) deep, it is relatively shallow for its size.

Broad Creek, the main inflow, enters the lake at the community of Keeley Lake. Other inflows include Little Whitefish River (flows into Marshy Bay) and Hawryluk Creek. On the eastern side, the Keeley River flows out and then north into Canoe Lake. Canoe Lake is connected to Lac Île-à-la-Crosse of the Churchill River via Canoe River.

== Fish species ==
Fish commonly found in Keeley Lake include walleye, northern pike, cisco, longnose sucker, yellow perch, and white sucker.

== See also ==
- List of lakes of Saskatchewan
