= Canoe Lake 165 =

Indian reserve in Saskatchewan, Canada

- Indian reserve
- Canoe Lake Indian Reserve No. 165
- Location in Saskatchewan
- Coordinates: 55°9′50″N 108°9′16″W
- First Nation: Canoe Lake
- Country: Canada
- Province: Saskatchewan

Government
  - Chief: Pluck Iron
  - MLA Athabasca: Leroy Laliberte
  - MP Desnethé—Missinippi—Churchill River: Buckley Belanger

Area
  - Total: 2,451 ha (6,060 acres)

Population (2016)
  - Total: 912
  - Density: 37.2/km^{2} (96.4/sq mi)
- Time zone: UTC−6 (Central Standard Time)
  - Summer (DST): UTC−5
- Postal code: S0M 0K0
- Area code: (1)306
- Highways: Hwy 965
- Community Well-Being Index: 53

Canoe Lake 165 is an Indian reserve of the Canoe Lake Cree First Nation in the boreal forest of northern Saskatchewan, Canada. Its location is on Canoe Lake approximately thirty miles west of Beauval, within the ancient hunting grounds of the Woodland Cree. In the 2016 Canadian Census, it recorded a population of 912 living in 250 of its 273 total private dwellings. In the same year, its Community Well-Being index was calculated at 53 of 100, compared to 58.4 for the average First Nations community and 77.5 for the average non-Indigenous community. The reserve includes the settlement of Canoe Narrows. The name of the reserve and the settlement in Cree is nêhiyaw-wapâsihk ᓀᐦᐃᔭᐤ ᐘᐹᓯᕽ.

Bordering Canoe Narrows to the east is the village of Jans Bay with a population of 187. Bordering Canoe Narrows to the west is the village of Cole Bay with a population of 230.

Commercial fishing was the community's original means of support; however, fish populations have diminished somewhat since the late 1970s. The community has since turned to forestry as its main industry.

== Canoe Lake First Nation ==
This town is the administrative headquarters of the Canoe Lake Cree First Nations band government and is affiliated with the Meadow Lake Tribal Council.

The registered population of the Canoe Lake Cree First Nation was 2,515 in October 2018. There were 1,149 members living on reserve and 1,366 members living off reserve. The Canoe Lake Cree Nation has seven locations with three on Canoe Lake.

== See also ==
- List of Indian reserves in Saskatchewan
