= Rusty Creek =

River in Saskatchewan, Canada

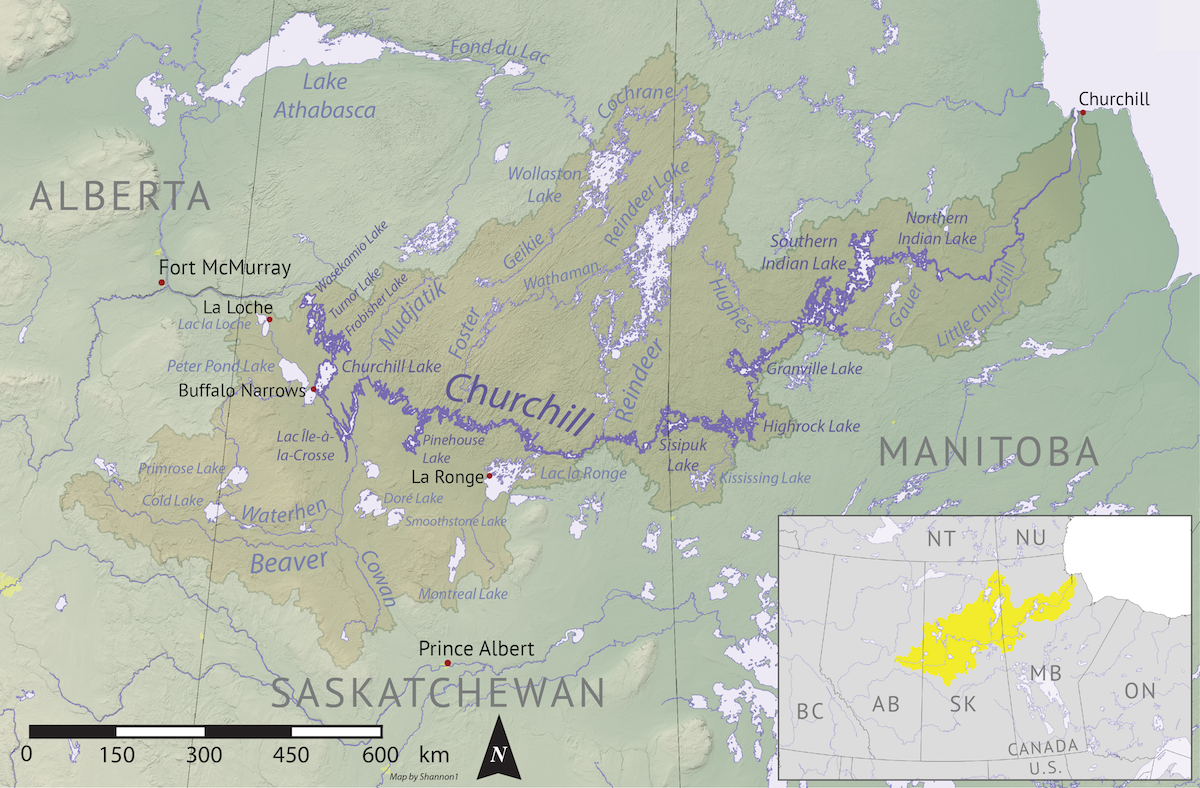
- Churchill River drainage basin

- Location of the mouth in Saskatchewan Rusty Creek (Canada)

Location
- Country: Canada
- Provinces: Saskatchewan

Physical characteristics
- Source: First Mustus Lake
  - location: Meadow Lake Provincial Park
  - coordinates: 54.4231°N 108.8123°W
  - elevation: 471 m (1,545 ft)
- Mouth: Waterhen River
  - location: Meadow Lake Provincial Park
  - coordinates: 54.3990°N 108.7405°W
  - elevation: 470 m (1,540 ft)

Basin features
- River system: Beaver River drainage basin

Rusty Creek is a river in the Canadian province of Saskatchewan. The river's source is First Mustus Lake, which is a lake in Meadow Lake Provincial Park, and its mouth is along the course of the Waterhen River. It is a south flowing river and the entirety of its course is in Meadow Lake Provincial Park and the boreal forest ecozone. Rusty Creek is a tributary of Waterhen River, which is a major tributary of Beaver River of the Churchill River and in the Hudson Bay drainage basin.

== Description ==
While Rusty Creek itself is relatively short, it has a comparatively large drainage basin that has its roots in the Mostoos Hills north of Meadow Lake Provincial Park. There are several small lakes and six notable lakes within its watershed. These include Rusty Lake, First Mustus Lake, Second Mustus Lake, Third Mustus Lake, Peitahigan Lake, and Fourth Mustus Lake. Rusty Lake is along the course of Rusty Creek and numerous creeks flow into the lakes including Dennis Creek, which flows into First Mustus Lake.

== See also ==
- List of rivers of Saskatchewan
- Hudson Bay drainage basin
- Tourism in Saskatchewan
