= First Mustus Lake =

Lake in Saskatchewan, Canada

- Location in Saskatchewan First Mustus Lake (Canada)
- Location: Meadow Lake Provincial Park, Saskatchewan
- Coordinates: 54.4334°N 108.8174°W
- Part of: Churchill River drainage basin
- Primary inflows: Dennis Creek
- River sources: Mostoos Hills
- Primary outflows: Rusty Creek
- Basin countries: Canada
- Surface area: 400.5 ha (990 acres)
- Max. depth: 15.25 m (50.0 ft)
- Surface elevation: 470 m (1,540 ft)
- Settlements: None

First Mustus Lake is a lake in Meadow Lake Provincial Park in the Canadian province of Saskatchewan in the boreal forest ecozone of Canada. The lake is the first of four lakes in a row named 'Mustus' in the Rusty Creek watershed. The other lakes are Second, Third, and Fourth Mustus. Rusty Creek and the lakes are part of the Waterhen River drainage basin. The Waterhen River is a tributary of the Beaver River, which flows north into Lac Île-à-la-Crosse and the Churchill River, a major tributary in the Hudson Bay drainage basin. Highway 224 provides access to both First and Second Mustus Lakes.

There are two main inflows for First Mustus Lake and one outflow. At the south-east corner of the lake, Rusty Creek flows out and into the next lake downstream, Rusty Lake. Dennis Creek, which has its source in the Mostoos Hills, flows into the north-east corner. The river from the other three Mustus Lakes and Peitahigan Lake flow into First Mustus at the western end. Kimball Lake is directly south of First Mustus, Rusty Lake is south-east, and Second and Third Mustus are to the west.

== Recreation ==
On the south-eastern shore of First Mustus Lake, just north of the Rusty Creek outflow, is First Mustus Campground. It is a reservation only campground that is for environmental education group camping. It features a solar-powered water system, composting toilets, food storage lockers, a six-tent cluster site, culvert barbecues, and a picnic shelter.

== Second, Third, and Fourth Mustus Lakes ==
Second Mustus Lake (54.4305°N 108.8792°W) is 121.6 ha (300 acres) in size, 4.9 m (16 ft) deep, and 470 m (1,540 ft) above sea level. A boat launch and washroom facilities are located along the southern shore, just off Highway 224. The lake's inflow from Third Mustus is at the northern shore and the outflow is at the eastern end.

Third Mustus Lake (54.4453°N 108.8831°W) is 342.9 ha (847 acres) in size and 20.12 m (66.0 ft) deep with an elevation of 472 m (1,549 ft). On the west side of the lake is a creek that flows from Peitahigan Lake and on the north shore of the lake is the creek that flows in from Fourth Mustus Lake. Along the southern shore is the lake's outflow, which flows a short distance south into Second Mustus Lake.

Fourth Mustus Lake (54.4645°N 108.8564°W) is the smallest at 62.6 ha (155 acres) in size and has an elevation of 512 m (1,680 ft) above sea level. The lake's outflow is at the eastern end of the lake and it flows south-west into Third Mustus Lake.

== Fish species ==
Fish species commonly found in the lakes include northern pike, walleye, and yellow perch.

== See also ==
- List of lakes of Saskatchewan
- Tourism in Saskatchewan
