= Rusty Lake =

Lake in Saskatchewan, Canada

- Location in Saskatchewan Rusty Lake (Canada)
- Location: Meadow Lake Provincial Park, Saskatchewan
- Coordinates: 54.4168°N 108.7674°W
- Part of: Churchill River drainage basin
- Primary inflows: Rusty Creek
- River sources: Mostoos Hills
- Primary outflows: Rusty Creek
- Basin countries: Canada
- Surface area: 172.1 ha (425 acres)
- Max. depth: 10.06 m (33.0 ft)
- Shore length^{1}: 8.42 km (5.23 mi)
- Surface elevation: 473 m (1,552 ft)
- ^{1} Shore length is not a well-defined measure.

Rusty Lake is a lake in Meadow Lake Provincial Park in the Canadian Province of Saskatchewan in the boreal forest ecozone of Canada. The lake is the first of six notable lakes in the Rusty Creek watershed part of Meadow Lake Provincial Park. The other lakes include First Mustus, Second Mustus, Third Mustus, Peitahigan, and Fourth Mustus.

Rusty Lake, Rusty Creek, and the other lakes are part of the Waterhen River drainage basin. The Waterhen River is a tributary of the Beaver River, which flows north into Lac Île-à-la-Crosse and the Churchill River, a major tributary in the Hudson Bay drainage basin. Highway 224 runs along the northern shore of Rusty Lake.

== Fish species ==
Fish species found in the lake include northern pike, walleye, and yellow perch.

== See also ==
- List of lakes of Saskatchewan
- Tourism in Saskatchewan
