= Saskatchewan Highway 965 =

Provincial highway in Saskatchewan, Canada

Highway 965

Route information
- Maintained by Ministry of Highways and Infrastructure
- Length: 43.9 km (27.3 mi)
- History: Formerly Hwy 101

Major junctions
- West end: Highway 903 near Cole Bay
- East end: Highway 155 near Beauval

Location
- Country: Canada
- Province: Saskatchewan
- Villages: Canoe Narrows

Highway system
- Provincial highways in Saskatchewan
← Highway 964	→ Highway 966

Highway 965 is a provincial highway in the north-west region of the Canadian province of Saskatchewan. It runs from Highway 903 to Highway 155. It is about 44 kilometres (27 mi) long.

Highway 965 also intersects the Cole Bay Access Road and the Canoe Narrows Access Road. It passes through the Canoe Lake Cree First Nation as well as the town of Jans Bay.

Highway 965 was originally designated as Highway 101, but was renumbered in the early 1980s as part of the establishment of the 900-series highways.

== See also ==
- Roads in Saskatchewan
- Transportation in Saskatchewan
