= Canoe Lake 165B =

Indian reserve in Saskatchewan, Canada

Coordinates: 55°10′53″N 108°06′39″W

- Indian reserve
- Canoe Lake Indian Reserve No. 165B
- Location in Saskatchewan
- First Nation: Canoe Lake
- Country: Canada
- Province: Saskatchewan

Area
  - Total: 217.3 ha (537 acres)

Canoe Lake 165B is an Indian reserve of the Canoe Lake Cree First Nation in Saskatchewan. It is 22 miles southwest of Île-à-la-Crosse.

== See also ==
- List of Indian reserves in Saskatchewan
