= Waterhen River (Saskatchewan) =

River in Saskatchewan, Canada

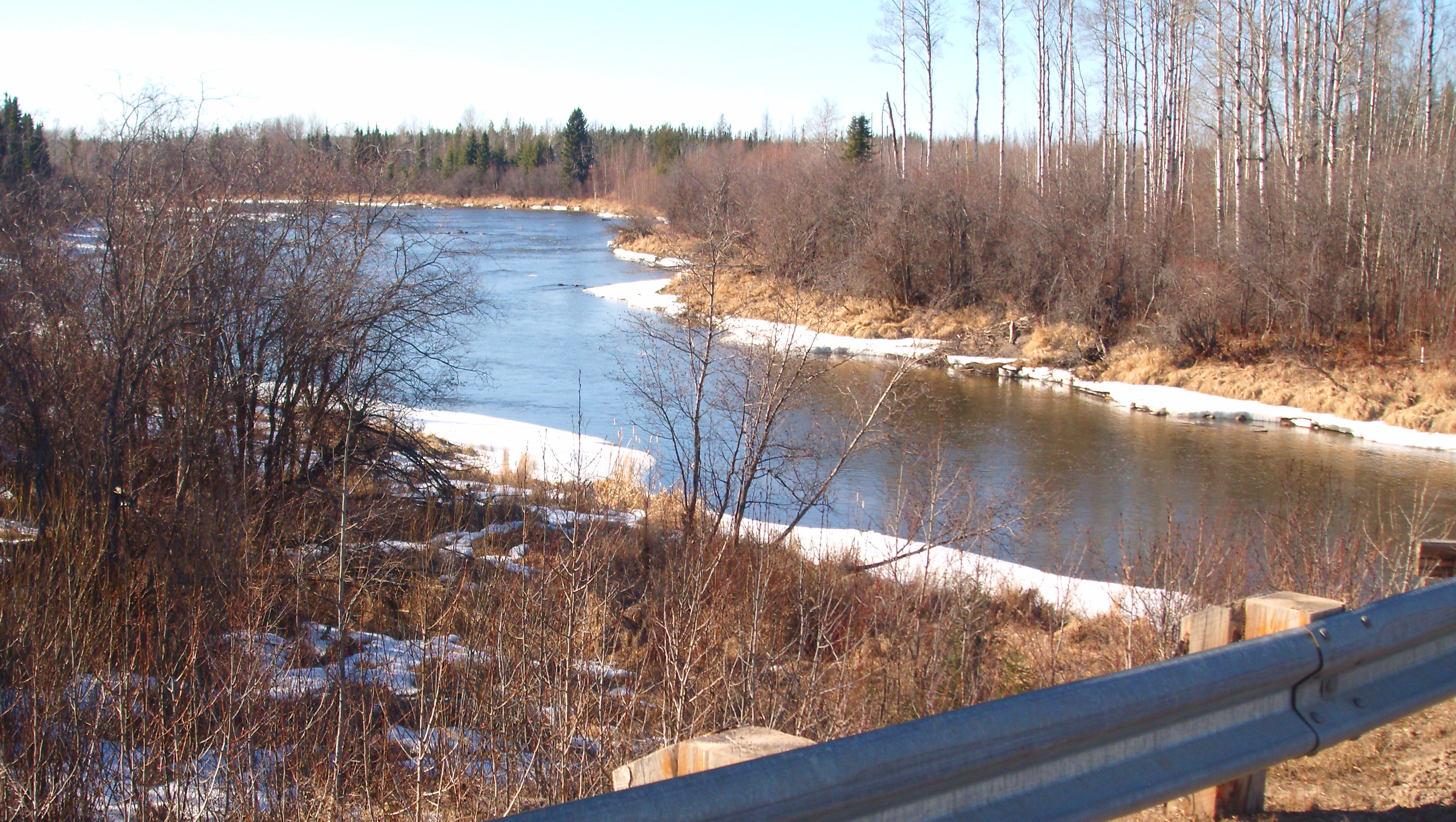
- Waterhen River at Highway 155

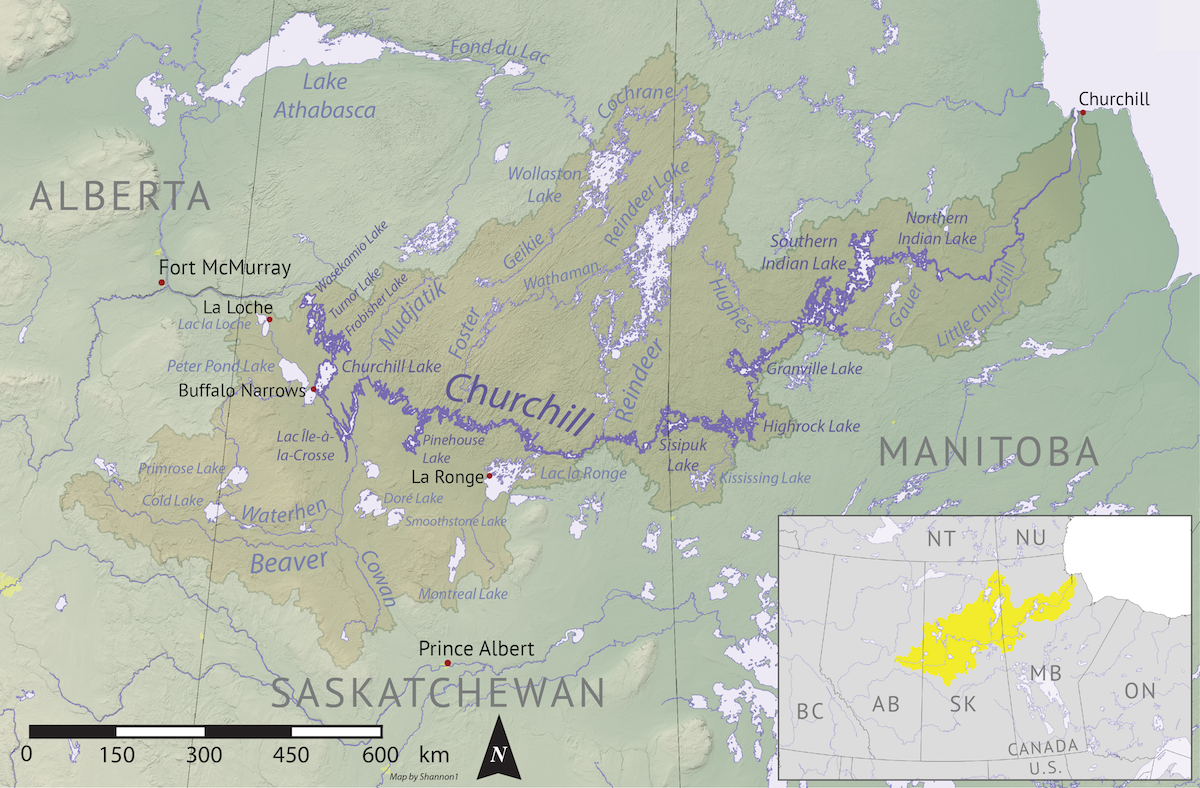
- Churchill River drainage basin

- Location of the mouth in Saskatchewan Waterhen River (Saskatchewan) (Canada)

Location
- Country: Canada
- Province: Saskatchewan

Physical characteristics
- Source: Lac des Îles
  - location: Meadow Lake Provincial Park
  - coordinates: 54°27′12″N 109°16′26″W
  - elevation: 496 m (1,627 ft)
- Mouth: Beaver River
  - location: Division 18, Saskatchewan
  - coordinates: 54°38′19″N 107°46′41″W

Basin features
- River system: Churchill River drainage basin
- Tributaries
  - left: Rusty Creek; Otter Creek; Shallow Creek
  - right: Masumakoos Creek; Gergley Creek

Waterhen River is an east-flowing river in the north-west area of the Canadian province of Saskatchewan in the drainage basin of the Beaver River. It is north of and parallel to the east-flowing part of the Beaver River and joins the north-flowing part of that river. Most of the river and its drainage basin is at the southern edge of the boreal forest belt. While the river's source is Lac des Îles, its drainage basin reaches north into the Mostoos Hills and west well into the neighbouring province of Alberta.

Cree began moving into the area in the eighteenth century. There was a canoe route up the Waterhen River with a portage to the Beaver River on the south side of Cold Lake. The first trading post in the area was Cold Lake House built by the Montreal traders in 1781 near the present Beaver Crossing, Alberta, south of Cold Lake. Around 1790 the North West Company had a post on Waterhen Lake.

The watershed of Waterhen River, including that of Cold River, is a major part of Saskatchewan's largest provincial park, Meadow Lake Provincial Park. There are no communities along the river's course, yet there are many amenities related to Meadow Lake Provincial Park and the villages of Dorintosh and Goodsoil nearby. Highways that cross the river include Highways 4, 155, 224, and 903. Along a portion of the southern bank, near Goodsoil, Waterhen River Road runs parallel to the river and provides access to it.

== Tributaries and course ==
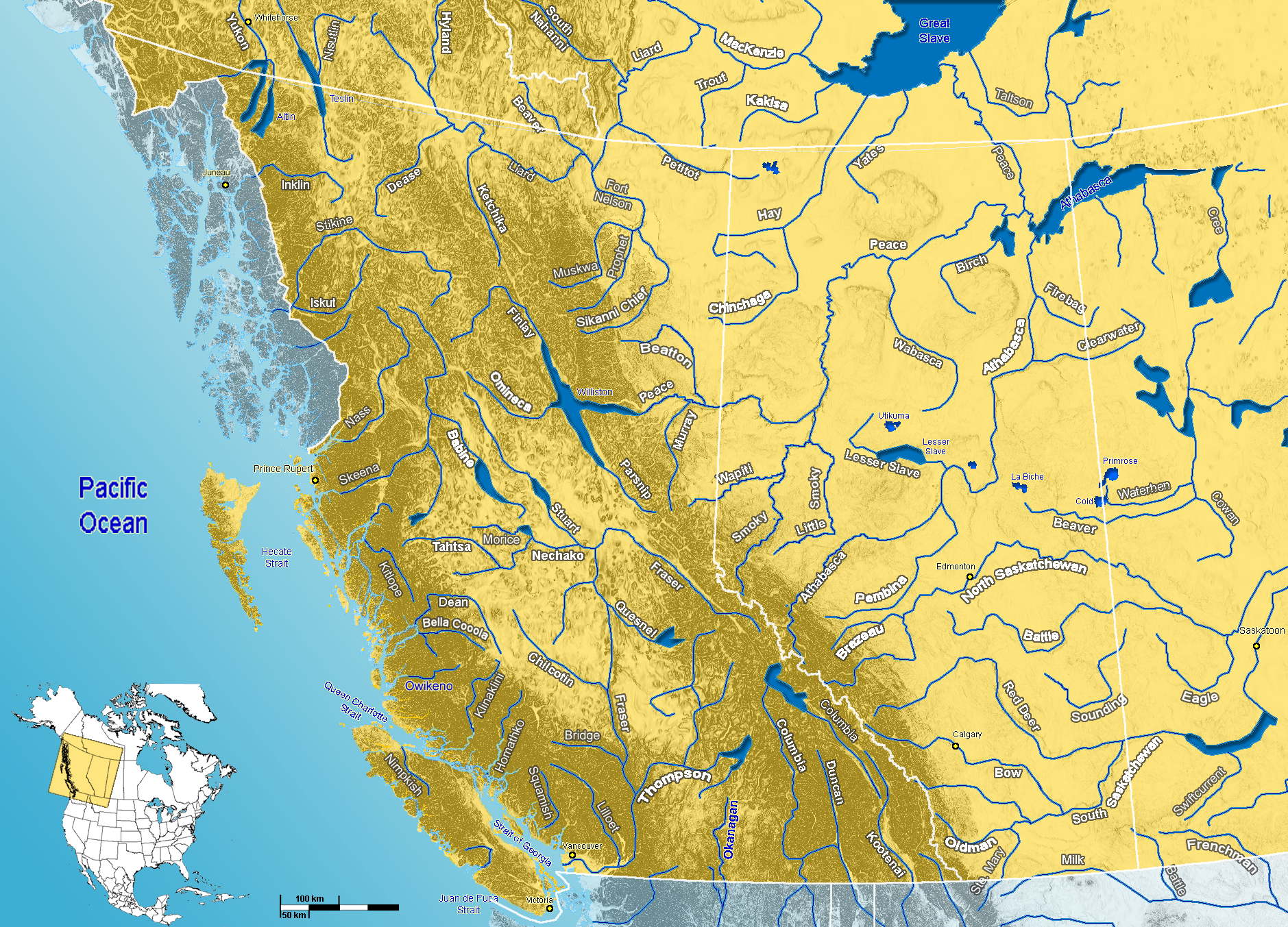
Western Canada rivers

Waterhen River has its beginnings at the large Primrose Lake in Saskatchewan. Primrose Lake discharges south through the Martineau River into Cold Lake on the Alberta / Saskatchewan border. Cold Lake then discharges east into the Cold River through Pierce and Lepine Lakes then into Lac des Îles.

The Waterhen River begins at the eastern end of Lac des Îles and flows eastward for about 65 kilometres (40 mi) following Highway 224 to Waterhen Lake. From Waterhen Lake, the river continues east for about 50 kilometres (31 mi) and meets the Beaver River near Highway 155. The section of the river between Lac des Îles and Waterhen Lake is in Meadow Lake Provincial Park. Coming out of the lake, it leaves the park and travels through Waterhen Lake First Nation en route to Beaver River. Beaver continues north and flows into Lac Île-à-la-Crosse, which is a lake along the course of the Churchill River–a major tributary of the Hudson Bay drainage basin.

Tributaries of the Waterhen River include

- Rusty Creek, which drains Rusty Lake, the Mustus Lakes, and Peitahigan Lake.
- Otter Creek and its tributaries originate in the Mostoos Hills. Otter Creek's source is Sergent Lake.
  - Carl Creek
  - De La Ronde Creek flows south from Mostoos Hills into Sergent Lake.
    - Taylor Creek
    - Laundry Creek starts at Mallard Lake and flows south into De La Ronde Creek.
- Shallow Creek originates at Shallow Lake in the Mostoos Hills.
  - Muskoseu Creek flows into Shallow Lake.
- Masumakoos Creek's source is Minnow Lake, on the south side of Waterhen River.
- Gergley Creek begins south of Gergley Lakes and flows north towards Waterhen River and into Stewart Lake. Stewart Lake empties directly into Waterhen River.

At the marshy delta where the Waterhen River flows into Waterhen Lake, a chain of three shallow lakes drain directly into the south side of the river. These include Niven, Matkin, and Iskwayach Lakes.

== Waterhen River Recreation Site ==
Waterhen River Recreation Site (54.6412461°N 107.81781°W) is a recreation site located on the south shore of the Waterhen River, about one mile upstream from the junction with Beaver River. The park is along Highway 155 in the Northern Saskatchewan Administration District, near the north-east boundary of the RM of Meadow Lake.

It is 12 hectares (30 acres) in size and provides access to the river for fishing and boating. To the east of the recreation site is the Waterhen River Campground.

South of the recreation site, along the south bank of the Waterhen River and west bank of the Beaver River is the Highway 155 Road Corridor Game Preserve.

== See also ==
- List of rivers of Saskatchewan
- Tourism in Saskatchewan
- Hudson Bay drainage basin
- North American fur trade
