= Saskatchewan Highway 951 =

Provincial highway in Saskatchewan, Canada

Highway 951

Route information
- Maintained by Ministry of Highways and Infrastructure
- Length: 15 km (9.3 mi)

Major junctions
- West end: Highway 941 near Waterhen Lake
- East end: Highway 903

Location
- Country: Canada
- Province: Saskatchewan

Highway system
- Provincial highways in Saskatchewan
← Highway 950	→ Highway 952

Highway 951 is a provincial highway in the northwest region of the Canadian province of Saskatchewan. It runs from Highway 941 to Highway 903. It is about 15 kilometres (9.3 mi) long.

The first 5 kilometres (3.1 mi) of Highway 951 lies within the borders of the Meadow Lake Provincial Park.

== See also ==
- Roads in Saskatchewan
- Transportation in Saskatchewan
