= Greig Lake (Saskatchewan) =

Lake in Saskatchewan, Canada

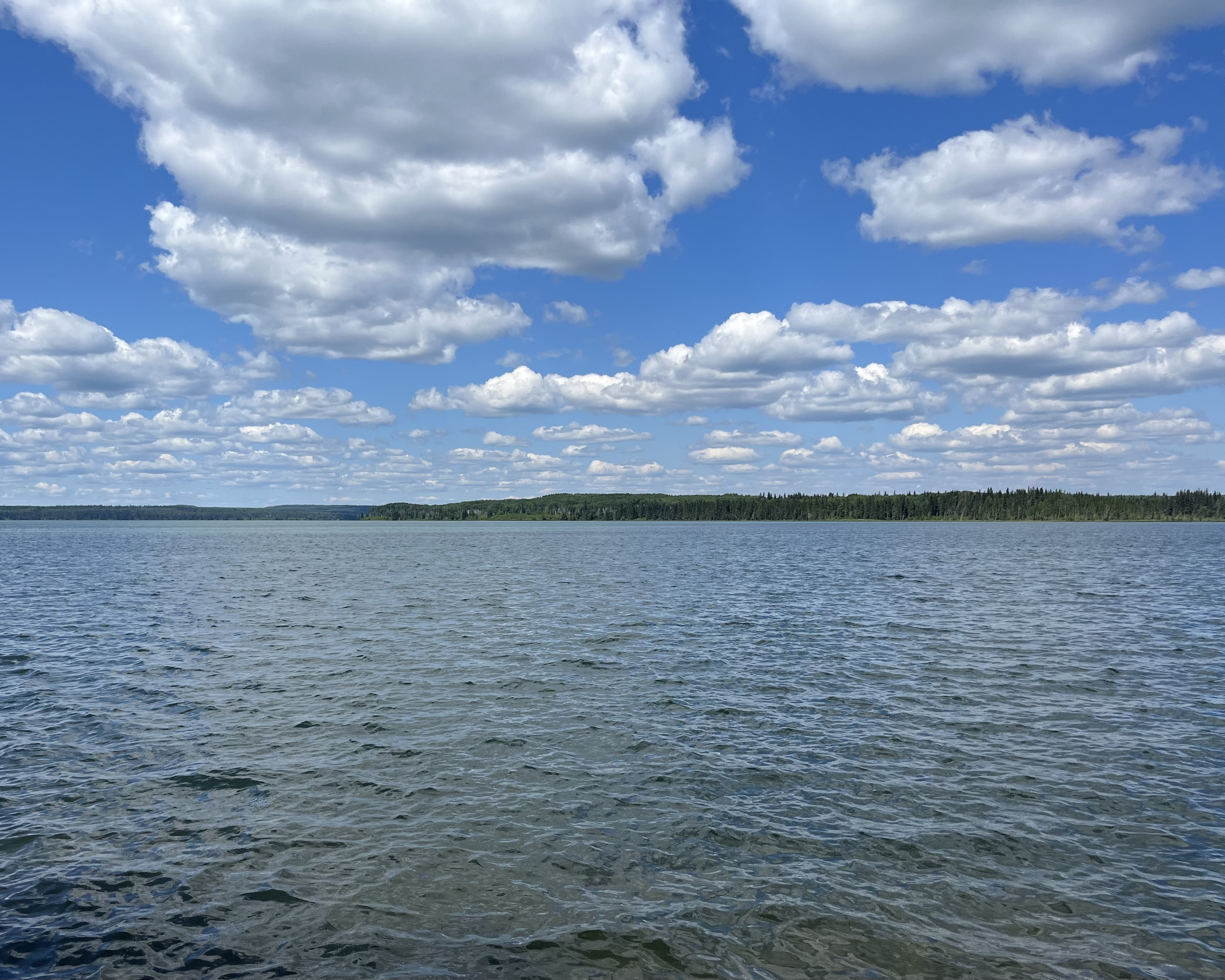
- Greig Lake as seen from the eastern shore

- Location in Saskatchewan Greig Lake (Canada)
- Location: Meadow Lake Provincial Park, Saskatchewan
- Coordinates: 54.4501°N 108.7174°W
- Part of: Churchill River drainage basin
- Basin countries: Canada
- Surface area: 1,614.5 ha (3,990 acres)
- Max. depth: 27.01 m (88.6 ft)
- Shore length^{1}: 24.42 km (15.17 mi)
- Surface elevation: 471 m (1,545 ft)
- Settlements: Greig Lake
- ^{1} Shore length is not a well-defined measure.

Greig Lake is a lake in Meadow Lake Provincial Park in the Canadian province of Saskatchewan in the boreal forest ecozone of Canada. On the eastern shore of the lake is the resort village of Greig Lake and Greig Lake Campground. The south-west corner of the lake has a resort called Waters Edge Eco Lodge. The lake is accessed from Highway 224 at the south end.

The entirety of Greig Lake is within Meadow Lake Provincial Park and it is located just north of the Waterhen River and north-east of Rusty and Kimball Lakes. The four Mustus Lakes, First, Second, Third, and Fourth, are to the west. Several small creeks flow into the lake and, at the south end, a creek flows out and into the Waterhen River via a fish trap. There is old Rearing Pond on the west side of the lake maybe used in 60's,70's 80's it also had a fish trap / gate . The lake is in the Beaver River watershed, which is part of the Churchill River and Hudson Bay drainage basin.

== Recreation ==
Located in Saskatchewan's largest provincial park, there are many amenities and activities in and around the lake. Greig Lake Campground is located at Greig Beach, which is a sandy beach about 50 metres in length, on the eastern shore. There are 150 individual campsites plus two group campgrounds, an 18-hole minigolf course, two boat launches, a store, and boat rentals. There are also showers, laundry, washrooms, and a sewer dump available. The park also has tennis/basketball courts, a baseball field, and a visitor's centre rep.

On the south-west corner of the lake is Waters Edge Eco Lodge. It is a full-service resort with cabin rentals.

== Fish species ==
Fish commonly found in Greig Lake include northern pike (also sliver pike colour morph), walleye, yellow perch, burbot, and lake Whitefish.

== See also ==
- List of lakes of Saskatchewan
- Tourism in Saskatchewan
