= Canoe Lake 165A =

Indian reserve in Saskatchewan, Canada

Coordinates: 55°09′26″N 108°23′13″W

- Indian reserve
- Canoe Lake Indian Reserve No. 165A
- Location in Saskatchewan
- First Nation: Canoe Lake
- Country: Canada
- Province: Saskatchewan

Area
  - Total: 1,158.3 ha (2,862 acres)

Canoe Lake 165A is an Indian reserve of the Canoe Lake Cree First Nation in Saskatchewan. It is 30 miles southwest of Île-à-la-Crosse.

== See also ==
- List of Indian reserves in Saskatchewan
