= Roadside 165F =

Indian reserve in Saskatchewan, Canada

Coordinates: 55°08′02″N 108°08′53″W

- Indian reserve
- Roadside Indian Reserve No. 165F
- Location in Saskatchewan
- First Nation: Canoe Lake
- Country: Canada
- Province: Saskatchewan

Area
  - Total: 0.4 ha (0.99 acres)

Roadside 165F is an Indian reserve of the Canoe Lake Cree First Nation in Saskatchewan.

== See also ==
- List of Indian reserves in Saskatchewan
