= Saskatchewan Highway 941 =

Provincial highway in Saskatchewan, Canada

Highway 941

Route information
- Maintained by Ministry of Highways and Infrastructure
- Length: 22 km (14 mi)

Major junctions
- West end: Highway 904 in Meadow Lake Provincial Park
- Highway 951
- North end: Waterhen Lake

Location
- Country: Canada
- Province: Saskatchewan

Highway system
- Provincial highways in Saskatchewan
← Highway 940	→ Highway 942

Highway 941 is a provincial highway in the Canadian province of Saskatchewan. It runs from Highway 904 to the Waterhen Lake First Nation. It is about 22 kilometres (14 mi) long.

The first 16 kilometres (9.9 mi) of Highway 941 lies within the Meadow Lake Provincial Park. At the 12-kilometre mark is an intersection with Highway 951. The town of Waterhen Lake is 4 kilometres (2.5 mi) south-east of the intersection, on the border of the Waterhen Lake First Nation. Highway 941 ends 6 kilometres (3.7 mi) into the Waterhen Lake First Nation at the Waterhen Lake.

== See also ==
- Roads in Saskatchewan
- Transportation in Saskatchewan
