= Peitahigan Lake =

Lake in Saskatchewan, Canada

- Location in Saskatchewan Peitahigan Lake (Canada)
- Location: Meadow Lake Provincial Park, Saskatchewan
- Coordinates: 54.4453°N 108.9457°W
- Part of: Churchill River drainage basin
- River sources: Mostoos Hills
- Basin countries: Canada
- Surface area: 274.5 ha (678 acres)
- Max. depth: 14.03 m (46.0 ft)
- Shore length^{1}: 8.432 km (5.239 mi)
- Surface elevation: 473 m (1,552 ft)
- Settlements: None
- ^{1} Shore length is not a well-defined measure.

Peitahigan Lake is a lake in Meadow Lake Provincial Park in the Canadian Province of Saskatchewan in the boreal forest ecozone of Canada. The lake is one of six notable lakes in the Rusty Creek watershed. The other lakes include Rusty, First Mustus, Second Mustus, Third Mustus, and Fourth Mustus. Rusty Creek and the lakes are part of the Waterhen River drainage basin. The Waterhen River is a tributary of the Beaver River, which flows north into Lac Île-à-la-Crosse and the Churchill River, a major tributary in the Hudson Bay drainage basin.

Several streams feed into Peitahigan Lake, including ones that drain the southern slopes of the Mostoos Hills. The outflow is a short east-flowing creek that flows into Third Mustus Lake.

Access to the lake is via a gravel road that runs along the west side of the lake that connects up with Highway 224 south of Peitahigan Lake. An 11-kilometre section of the Boreal Trail goes around the lake and over by the Mustus Lakes.

== Fish species ==
Fish species found in the lake include lake whitefish, northern pike, and walleye. The lake was last stocked with 200,000 walleye fry in 2022.

== See also ==
- List of lakes of Saskatchewan
- Tourism in Saskatchewan
