= Onikahp Sahghikansis 165E =

Coordinates: 55°09′56″N 108°03′27″W

- Indian reserve
- Onikahp Sahghikansis Indian Reserve No. 165E
- Location in Saskatchewan
- First Nation: Canoe Lake
- Country: Canada
- Province: Saskatchewan

Area
  - Total: 1,503 ha (3,710 acres)

Onikahp Sahghikansis 165E is an Indian reserve of the Canoe Lake Cree First Nation in Saskatchewan.
