= Keeley Lake =

Hamlet in Saskatchewan, Canada

Coordinates: 54°54′00″N 108°08′00″W

Location of Keeley Lake in Saskatchewan

Keeley Lake is a hamlet in Northern Saskatchewan, Canada. It is on the southern shore of Keeley Lake, adjacent to Wepuskow Sahgaiechan 165D Indian reserve. The lake's main inflow, Broad Creek, enters the lake at the community. Access is from a gravel road that connects to the intersection of Highway 903 and Highway 904.

Live the Dreams Resort is an outfitters and lodge in the community.

== See also ==
- List of communities in Saskatchewan
