= Pierceland Central School =

School in Saskatchewan, Canada

Coordinates: 54.3394°N 109.7833°W

Pierceland Central School (PCS) is a pre-K to 12 school in Pierceland, Saskatchewan. PCS is one of twenty-four schools in the Northwest School Division. The division spans seventeen communities in north west Saskatchewan. The school mascot is the Panther. There are four house teams - Bobcats, Cheetahs, Lynx and Pumas.

== Demographics ==
Students

Grades:	preK to Grade 12
Student Population:	approx. 300
Average Class Size:	18 pupils

Staff

Teaching staff:	17
Support staff:	6
SCC:	14

== Facilities ==
PCS houses 13 classrooms, a science lab, a full court gym, a large library, a shop with air and power tools, and a home economics room set up for sewing and cooking. There is a newly renovated 30-station computer lab with an additional 10 student computers in the library, and a single computer in every classroom all with internet access. Also in the high school end is a newly renovated conference room. In the elementary wing, there is a very well-equipped resource room as well as a band room.
