= Saskatchewan Highway 954 =

Provincial highway in Saskatchewan, Canada

Highway 954

Route information
- Maintained by Ministry of Highways and Infrastructure
- Length: 12.9 km (8.0 mi)

Major junctions
- West end: Northern Cross Resort in Lac des Îles
- East end: Highway 26 / Highway 224 in Goodsoil

Location
- Country: Canada
- Province: Saskatchewan

Highway system
- Provincial highways in Saskatchewan
← Highway 953	→ Highway 955

Highway 954 is a provincial highway in the Canadian province of Saskatchewan. It runs from Highway 26 on the north side of Goodsoil to a dead end at Northern Cross Resort on Lac des Îles within Meadow Lake Provincial Park. At the eastern end of the highway is the Goodsoil Airport. It is about 12.9 kilometres (8.0 mi) long.

== Major intersections ==
Rural municipality	Location	km	mi	Destinations	Notes
Northern Administration District		0.0	0.0	Northern Cross Resort	Western terminus
Northern Administration District	Goodsoil	12.9	8.0	Highway 26 south / Highway 224 north – Peerless	Eastern terminus
1.000 mi = 1.609 km; 1.000 km = 0.621 mi

== See also ==
- Roads in Saskatchewan
- Transportation in Saskatchewan
