= Eagles Lake 165C =

Indian reserve in Saskatchewan, Canada

Coordinates: 54°07′02″N 108°00′13″W

- Indian reserve
- Eagles Lake First Nation No. 165C
- Location in Saskatchewan
- First Nation: Canoe Lake
- Country: Canada
- Province: Saskatchewan
- Community: Eagles Lake Store

Government
  - Acting Chief: None.

Area
  - Total: 3,449.6 ha (8,524 acres)

Population (2021)
  - Total: 365
  - Density: 10.6/km^{2} (27.4/sq mi)
- Area code: 306
- Community Well-Being Index: 72

Eagles Lake 165C is an Indian reserve of the Canoe Lake Cree First Nation in Saskatchewan. It consists of all that portion of Township 59, Range 14, west of the Third Meridian. In the 2016 Canadian Census, it recorded a population of 92 living in 29 of its 32 total private dwellings. In the same year, its Community Well-Being index was calculated at 72 of 100, compared to 58.4 for the average First Nations community and 77.5 for the average non-Indigenous community.

== See also ==
- List of Indian reserves in Saskatchewan
