= Canoe Lake (Saskatchewan) =

Lake in Saskatchewan, Canada

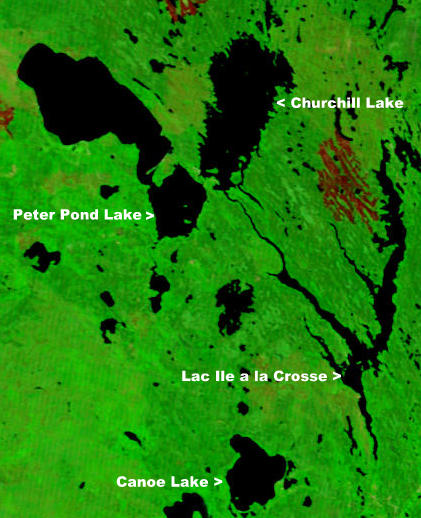
- NASA map showing Canoe Lake at bottom centre

- Location in Saskatchewan Canoe Lake (Canada)
- Location: Northern Administration District, Saskatchewan
- Coordinates: 55°10′00″N 108°15′03″W
- Part of: Churchill River drainage basin
- Primary inflows: Arseneault River; Keely River
- Primary outflows: Canoe River
- Basin countries: Canada
- Surface area: 19,260 ha (47,600 acres)
- Max. depth: 14.94 m (49.0 ft)
- Shore length^{1}: 140 km (87 mi)
- Surface elevation: 423 m (1,388 ft)
- Islands: Cole Island
- Settlements: Canoe Narrows; Cole Bay; Jans Bay
- ^{1} Shore length is not a well-defined measure.

Canoe Lake is a lake in the north-western part of the Canadian province of Saskatchewan. Settlements on the lake include Canoe Narrows, Cole Bay, and Jans Bay. The lake is accessed from Highways 965 and 903. On the western shore is a provincial recreation site called Canoe Lake Recreation Site. The Canoe River flows east from the lake to Lac Île-à-la-Crosse.

== History ==
In 1889, the Hudson's Bay Company established a post on Canoe Lake as a winter outpost of Île-à-la-Crosse. By 1933, it was abandoned.

== Canoe Lake Recreation Site ==
Most of the western shore of the lake from Cole Bay in the south to Anderson Bay is the north is part of Canoe Lake Recreation Site (55.2119°N 108.3343°W). The park, which is leased to a private operator, covers an area of 1,585 ha (3,920 acres) and has a campground with 46 campsites. The park also has a boat launch and offers access to the lake for water sports, fishing, and swimming. Access is from Highway 903.

== Fish species ==
Fish commonly found in the lake include northern pike, lake whitefish, and longnose suckers.

== See also ==
- List of lakes of Saskatchewan
