= Meadow Lake Provincial Park =

Provincial park in Saskatchewan, Canada

- IUCN category II (national park)
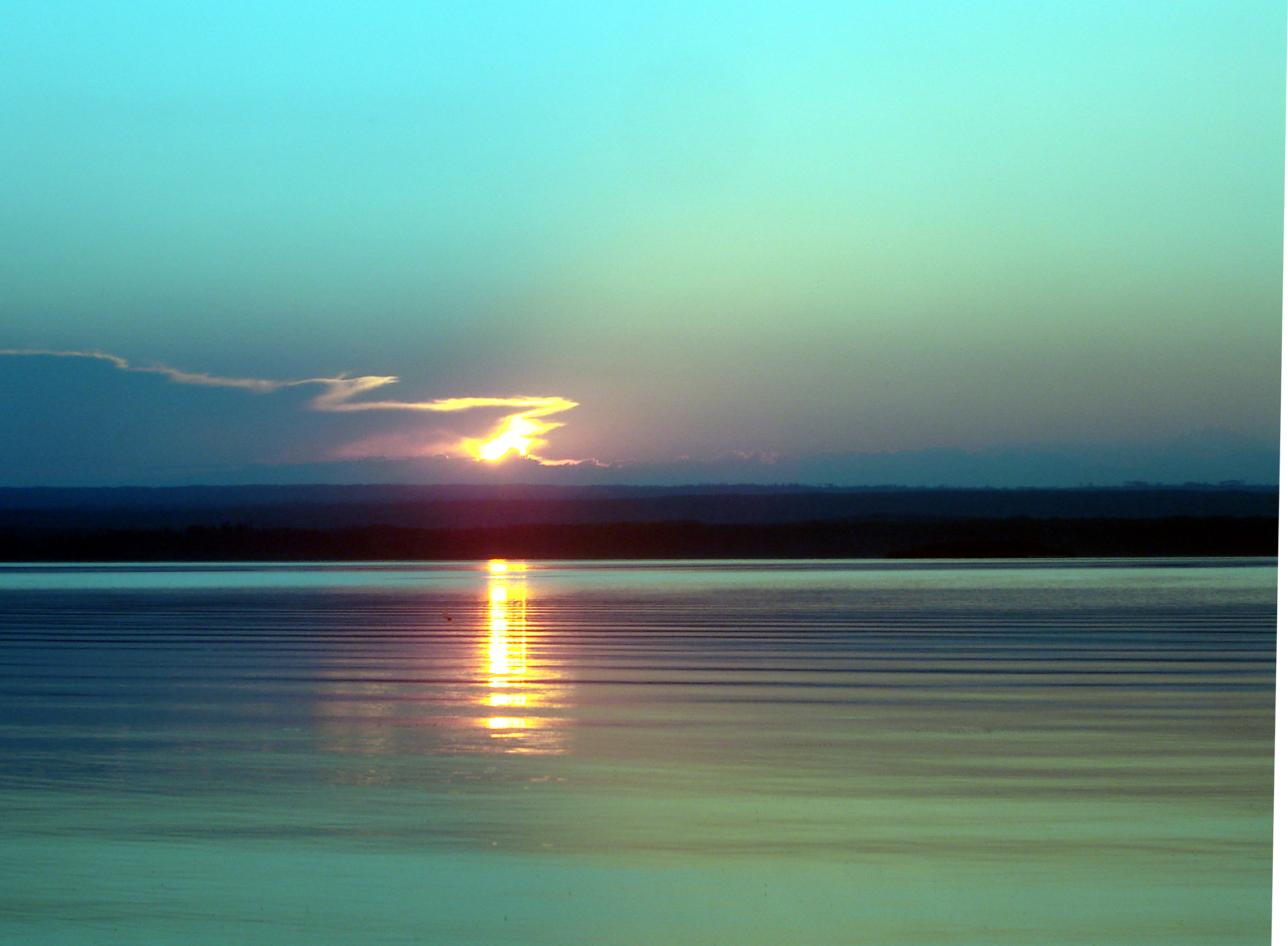
- Flotten Lake at the northern end of the park

- Location within Saskatchewan Location within Canada
- Interactive map of Meadow Lake Provincial Park
- Location: Saskatchewan, Canada
- Nearest city: Meadow Lake
- Coordinates: 54.4038°N 108.9489°W
- Length: 113 km (70 mi)
- Width: 32 km (20 mi)
- Area: 1,600 km^{2} (620 sq mi)
- Established: 10 March 1959
- Governing body: Sask Parks

Meadow Lake Provincial Park is a northern boreal forest provincial recreational park along the Waterhen and Cold Rivers in the Canadian province of Saskatchewan. The park was founded on 10 March 1959, is the largest provincial park in Saskatchewan, and encompasses over 25 lakes in an area of 1,600 km^{2} (620 sq mi). The park was named "Meadow Lake" after the city of Meadow Lake and Meadow Lake. The city and the lake are not in the park and are located about 40 kilometres (25 mi) south-east of the nearest park entrance, which is about 5 kilometres (3.1 mi) north of Dorintosh. The length of the park stretches about 113 kilometres (70 mi) from Cold Lake on the Saskatchewan / Alberta border in the west to the eastern shore of Waterhen Lake in the east.

In-season amenities and recreational opportunities inside the park include camping, hiking, cabin rentals, fishing, swimming, boat rentals, and outfitters. There are also baseball diamonds, tennis courts, mini-golf, and playgrounds. In the winter, there is snowmobiling, ice fishing, and cross-country skiing.

Located near the park are other recreational opportunities, services, and amenities. Alberta's Cold Lake Provincial Park is located adjacent to the western border, near the Goodsoil park entrance is Goodsoil Airport and Northern Meadows Golf Club, Pagan Lake Recreation Site is on Highway 903 south-east of Waterhen Lake, and east of the park along the Waterhen River is Waterhen River Recreation Site. The Mostoos Hills are in the northern part of the park and continue north of the park.

== Location and access ==
There are three main entrances to Meadow Lake Provincial Park spread along the southern boundary and two other entrances by the eastern boundary.

The western gateway into the park is via the village of Pierceland along Highway 21. The central access is through the village of Goodsoil along Highway 26, which is located approximately 78 kilometres (48 mi) west of the city of Meadow Lake. Dorintosh is 5 kilometres (3.1 mi) south of the eastern entrance along Highway 4. Highway 55 parallels the park's southern boundary and provides access to the highways leading into the park and the nearby amenities.

At the eastern end of the park, by Waterhen Lake, Highway 951 provides access to the eastern end of the park and Highway 904 comes into the park at the north-eastern corner by Flotten Lake. Both Highways 904 and 951 connect up with Highway 903, which drops south to Highway 55.

The main arteries in the park include Highways 224, 904, 950, and 951. They provide access to the various campgrounds, lakes, and resorts around the park.

== Resorts and campgrounds ==
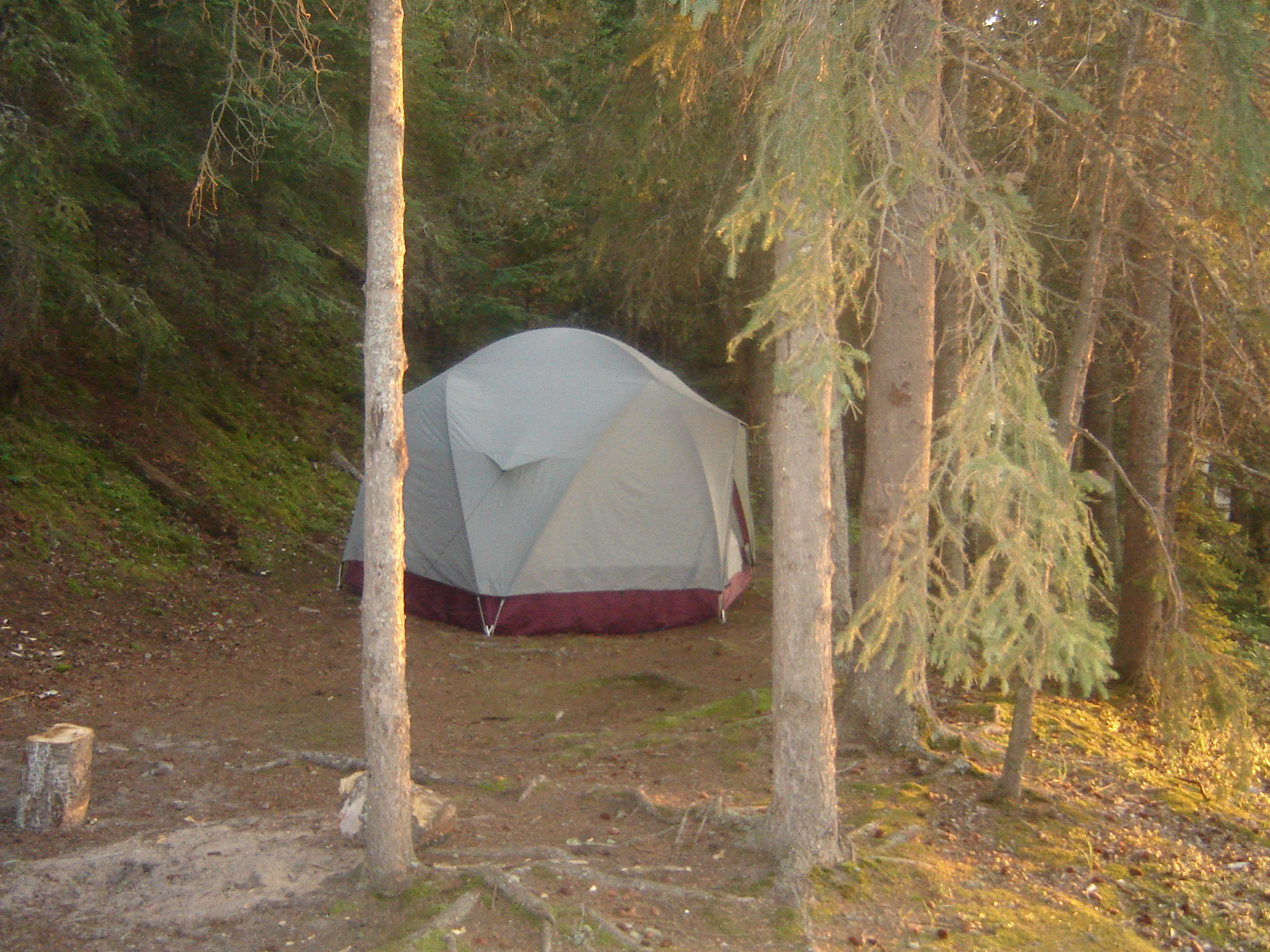
A tent at a campground in the park

There are over 800 campsites spread over 12 campgrounds, including a variety of sites available ranging from RV accessible sites to back county tenting only sites, including along the Boreal Trail, which features several tenting only 'Leave-No-Trace' campsites. As well as campgrounds, there are also several resorts and cabins.

- Tawaw Cabins is on the western shore of Waterhen Lake and has cabin rentals and campsites. There is also an outfitters located there.
- Miywasin Ota Resort, formerly M & N Resort, is also on the western shore of Waterhen Lake, just north of Tawaw. It has long term and short term cabins for rent.
- Waterhen Lake Campground is nestled amongst Tawaw Cabins and Miywasin Ota Resort on the western shore of Waterhen Lake.
- Greig Lake Campground is near the resort community of Greig Lake on the eastern shore of Greig Lake. The campground features 150 campsites, washrooms, showers, a boat launch, laundry, a sani-dump, a store, and an 18-hole mini-golf course.
- Waters Edge Eco Lodge, a full-service resort with cabin rentals, is on the south-west corner of Greig Lake.
- Kimball Lake Campground is on the eastern shore of Kimball Lake, just off Highway 224. The campground has 190 individual sites, plus group camping, which range from full service to just electric to no hookups. There is beach access, showers, washrooms, a sani-dump, and laundry facilities.
- Sandy Beach Campground is on the southern shore of Pierce Lake, just off Highway 919, and features 83 individual campsites as well as several group sites. Facilities include beach access, a boat launch, washrooms, showers, a concession stand, and electric and non-electric campsites.
- Pierce Lake Lodge is at Howe Bay on Pierce Lake, just off Highway 950. The lodge offers 55 campsites, a variety of cabins for rent, beach access, and access to the 24-kilometre marker of the Boreal Trail.
- Hirtz Lake Campground is a small, 'leave-no-trace' campground on the eastern shore of Hirtz Lake. Access is from Highway 919.
- Matheson Lake Campground has 46 non-electric sites and is a first-come-first-serve campground. It is on the northern shore of Matheson Lake, just off Highway 224.
- Vivian Lake Campground is on the west side of Vivian Lake, which is just east of Matheson Lake and is accessed by Highway 224. There are eight non-electric campsites, lake access, and access to a 1.5-mile trail the goes along the north side of the lake.
- Mistohay Lake Campground, also first-come-first-serve, consists of 20 non-electric sites at the eastern end of Mistohay Lake.
- Flotten Lake North and South Campgrounds are on the eastern shore of Flotten Lake. There are 25 non-electric, first-come-first-serve, sites between them. The campgrounds provide access to the lake and multiple hiking trails.
- Flotten Lake Adventures is located on Flotten Lake, just south of the North and South Campgrounds. It offers camping and cabins for rent.
- Big Island Cove Resort is a resort on the southern shore of Lac des Îles. It offers 14 rentable cabins, 27 campsites, beach access, and water sport rentals. There is a general store that carries tackle, souvenirs, confectionery, and groceries. The resort has beach access and there are plenty of nearby nature hiking trails. Highway 954 provides access to the resort.
- Northern Cross Resort is also on the southern shore of Lac des Îles, only a short distance west from Big Island Cove Resort along Highway 954. This resort offers full-service camping, modern cabins for rent, boating with rentals, and access to a sandy beach and nature trails.
- Murray Doell Campground is on the northern shore of Lac des Îles along Highway 950 and Bear Creek and offers 43 electric campsites. It is 15 kilometres (9.3 mi) west of the junction of Highways 224 and 950.
- Camp Oshkidee, a summer camp, is on the northern shore of Jeannette Lake. It is accessed by Highway 904.
- Bethel Gospel Camp is a Christian summer camp on the southern shore of Jeannette Lake. It is accessed by Highway 941.
- First Mustus Campground is on the south-eastern shore of First Mustus Lake off Highway 224. It is a reservation only campground that is for environmental education group camping. It features a solar-powered water system, composting toilets, food storage lockers, a six tent cluster site, culvert barbecues, and a picnic shelter.

== Boreal Trail ==
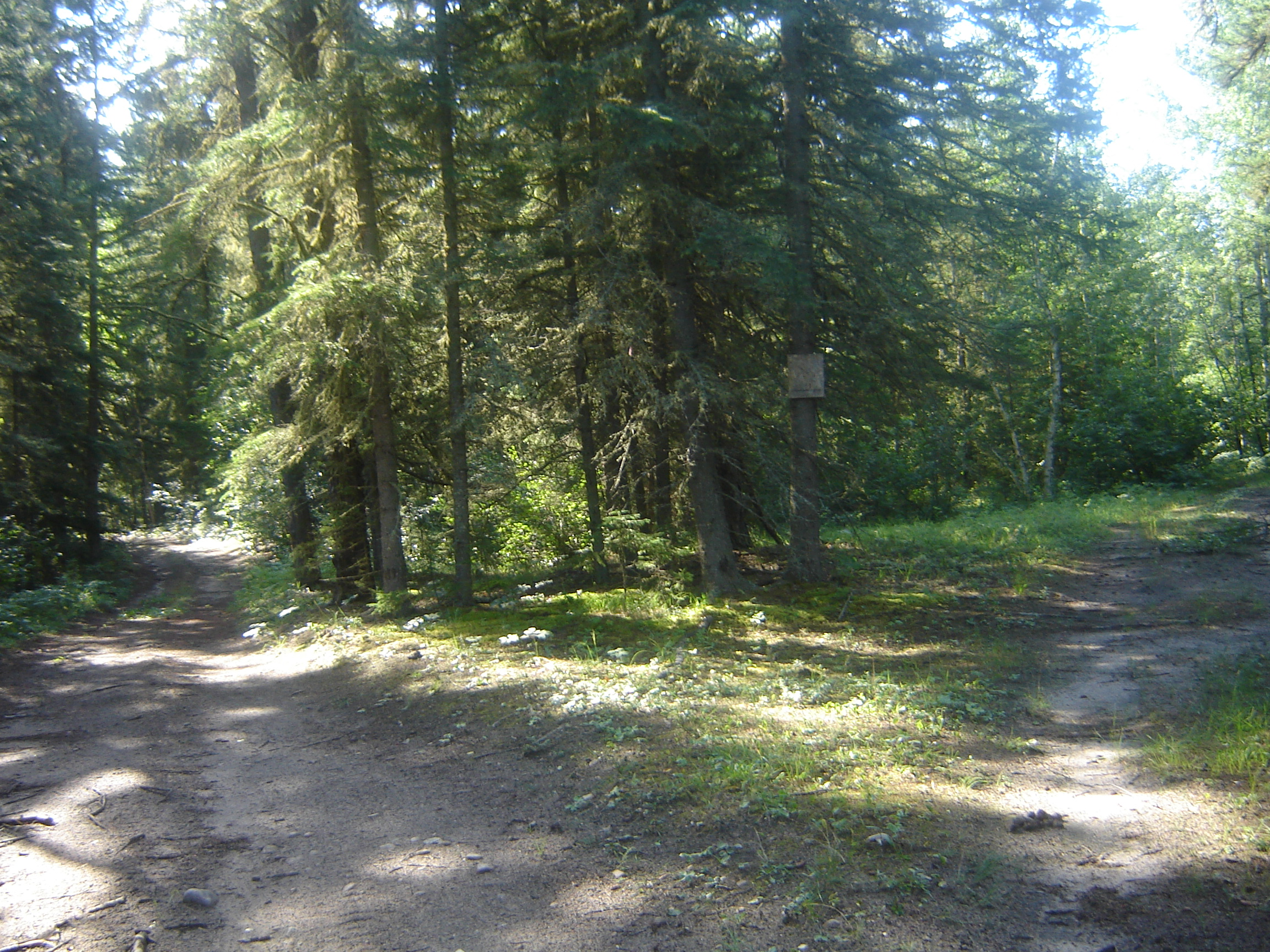
Trails through the boreal forest

The Boreal Trail, which officially opened in June 2011, is the only destination year-round backpacking trail in the Saskatchewan provincial park system. The trail winds through the boreal forest of northern Saskatchewan along the courses of the Cold and Waterhen Rivers. It stretches 135 kilometres (84 mi) from end to end and has multiple entry points. The western trailhead is located along the eastern shore of Cold Lake at Cold River, about 800 metres (870 yd) south of Cold River Campground and can be accessed from Highway 919. The trail runs almost the whole length of the park with multiple branch trails and the eastern trail head is near Greig Lake. The main trail and its branches provide access to many lakes along the way, including Pierce Lake, Lac des Îles, Peitahigan Lake, the Mustus Lakes, de Balinhard Lake, and Mistohay Lake. The trail itself is well marked with sign posts almost every kilometre and the Boreal Trail Shuttle offers transport between different points of the trail.

== Flora and fauna ==
Meadow Lake Provincial Park's wildlife and vegetation is that typical of a boreal forest. Trees found in the park include aspen, birch, jack pine, and spruce. Loons, pelicans, bald eagles, black bears, beaver, coyotes, wolves, moose, and elk, among others, are found in the forest. The lakes are inhabited by fish such as walleye, northern pike, and lake trout.

== Gallery ==
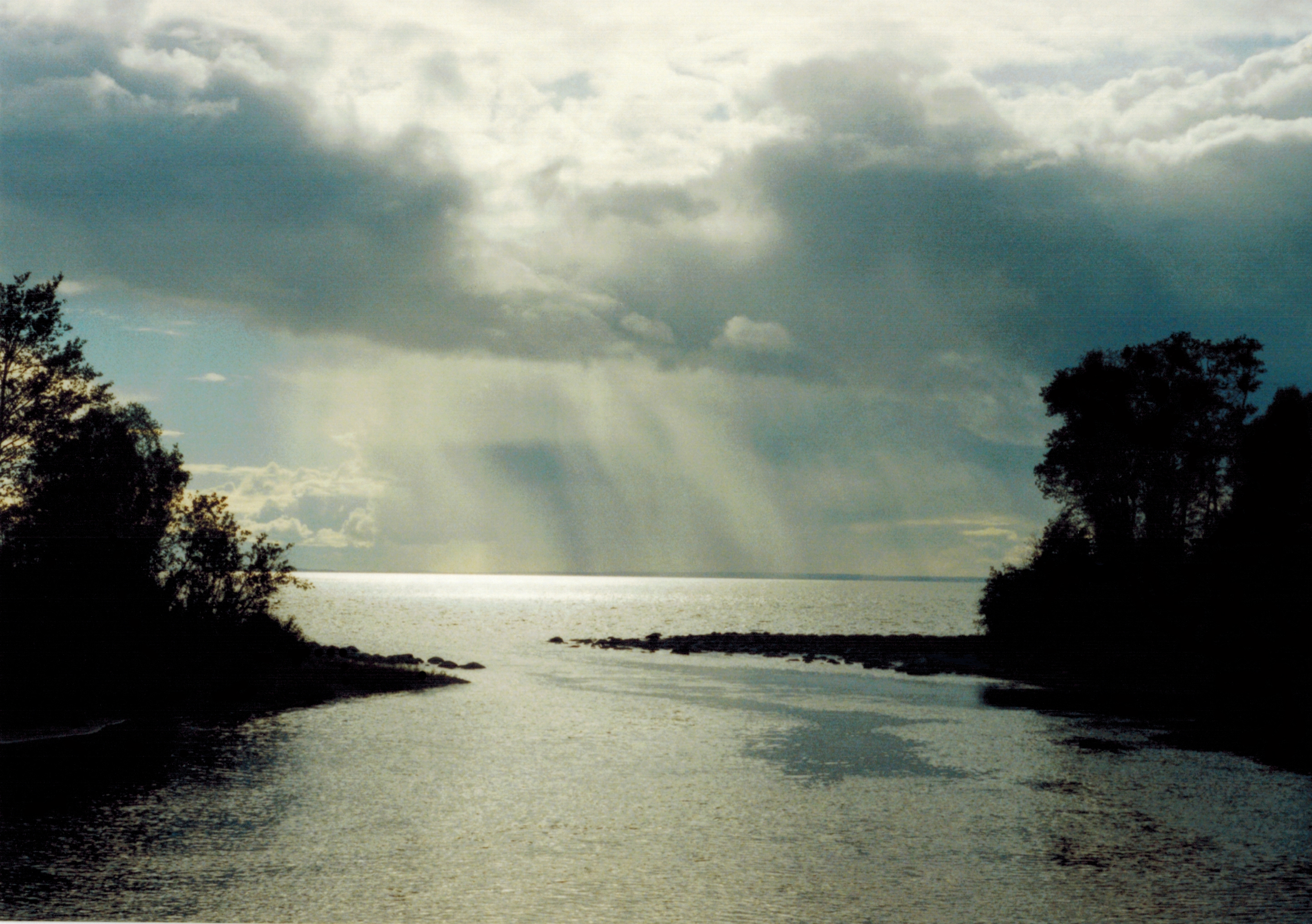
Cold Lake and Cold River at the western end of the park

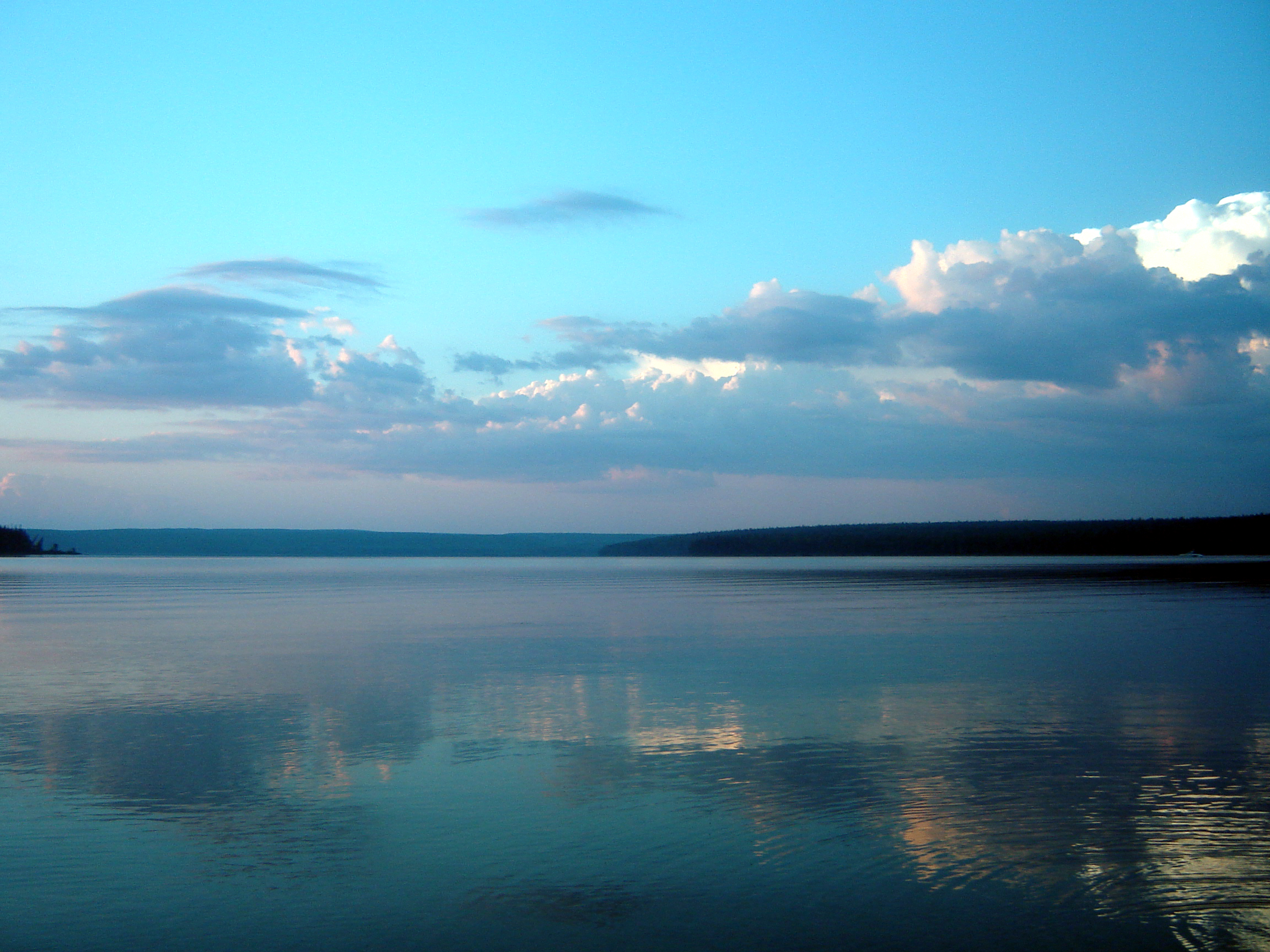
Flotten Lake, dusk

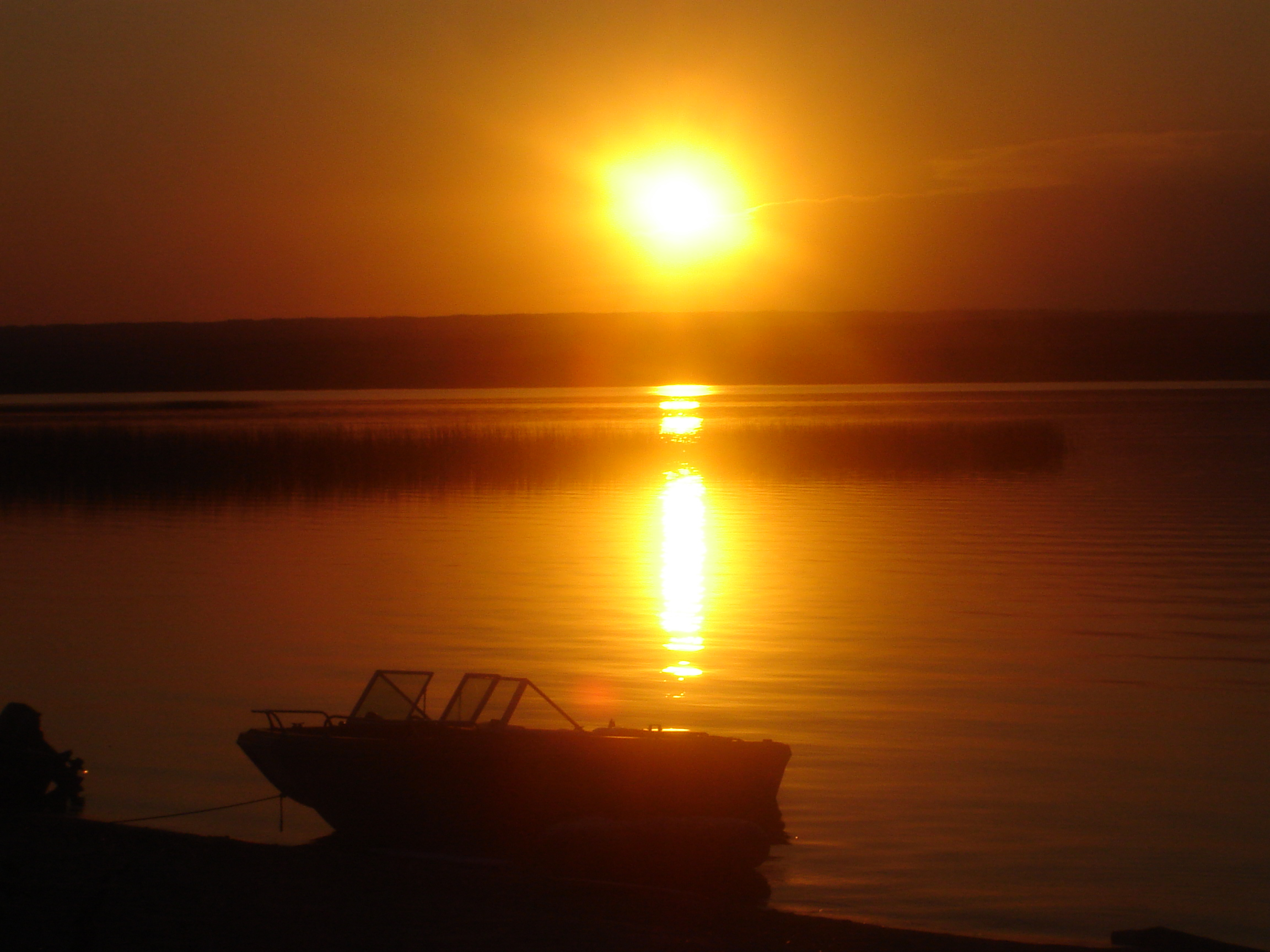
Flotten Lake, sunset

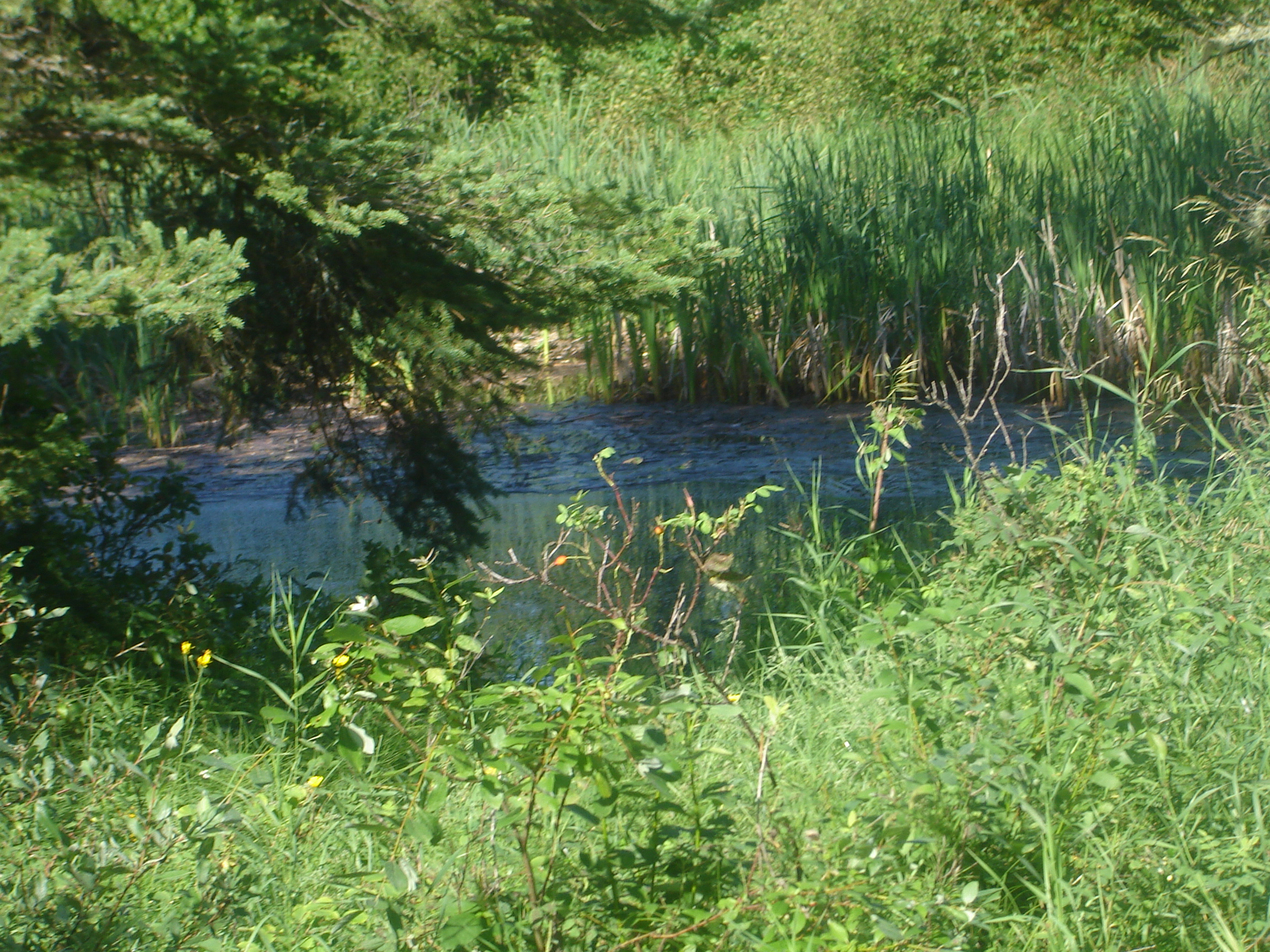
Creek and cattails near Flotten Lake

== See also ==
- List of provincial parks in Saskatchewan
- List of protected areas of Saskatchewan
- Tourism in Saskatchewan
