= Rural Municipality of Beaver River No. 622 =

Rural Municipality in Saskatchewan, Canada

Beaver River No. 622
- Rural municipality
- Rural Municipality of Beaver River No. 622
- Location of the RM of Beaver River No. 622 in Saskatchewan
- Coordinates: 54.247°N 109.508°W
- Country: Canada
- Province: Saskatchewan
- Census division: 17
- SARM division: 6
- Federal riding: Desnethé—Missinippi—Churchill River
- Provincial riding: Lloydminster; Meadow Lake
- Formed: January 1, 1978

Government
  - Reeve: Kevin Turchyn
  - Governing body: RM of Beaver River No. 622 Council
  - Administrator: Sharon Stacey (Interim) Nicole Neufeld
  - Office location: Pierceland

Area (2016)
  - Land: 2,370.09 km^{2} (915.10 sq mi)

Population (2016)
  - Total: 1,216
  - Density: 0.5/km^{2} (1.3/sq mi)
- Time zone: CST
  - Summer (DST): CST
- Postal code: S0M 2K0
- Area codes: 306 and 639
- Website: Official website

The Rural Municipality of Beaver River No. 622 (2016 population: 1,216) is a rural municipality (RM) in the Canadian province of Saskatchewan within Census Division No. 17 and SARM Division No. 6. It is located in the northwest-central portion of the province. The RM of Beaver River No. 622 is the highest numbered rural municipality in Saskatchewan.

== History ==
The RM of Beaver River No. 622 incorporated as a rural municipality on January 1, 1978.

== Geography ==
=== Communities and localities ===
The following urban municipalities are surrounded by the RM.

Villages

- Goodsoil
- Pierceland

The Big Island Lake Cree Territory is within the RM, as is the Ministikwan 161A First Nations Indian reserves and Thunderchild First Nation territories.

== Demographics ==
Population history (1981–2016)
Year	Pop.	±%
1981	1,171	—
1986	1,231	+5.1%
1991	1,103	−10.4%
1996	1,090	−1.2%
2001	1,099	+0.8%
2006	1,108	+0.8%
2011	1,017	−8.2%
2016	1,216	+19.6%
Source: Statistics Canada via Saskatchewan Bureau of Statistics

In the 2021 Census of Population conducted by Statistics Canada, the RM of Beaver River No. 622 had a population of 1,277 living in 496 of its 894 total private dwellings, a change of 5% from its 2016 population of 1,216. With a land area of 2,356.32 km^{2} (909.78 sq mi), it had a population density of 0.5/km^{2} (1.4/sq mi) in 2021.

In the 2016 Census of Population, the RM of Beaver River No. 622 recorded a population of 1,216 living in 441 of its 841 total private dwellings, a 19.6% change from its 2011 population of 1,017. With a land area of 2,370.09 km^{2} (915.10 sq mi), it had a population density of 0.5/km^{2} (1.3/sq mi) in 2016.

== Government ==
The RM of Beaver River No. 622 is governed by an elected municipal council and an appointed administrator that meets on the third Thursday of every month. The reeve of the RM is Kevin Turchyn while its administrator is Sharon Stacey. The RM's office is located in Pierceland.
