= Canoe Lake Cree First Nation =

Cree First Nation based in Saskatchewan, Canada

- Band No. 394
- People: Cree
- Treaty: Treaty 10
- Headquarters: Canoe Narrows
- Province: Saskatchewan

Land
- Main reserve: Canoe Lake 165
- Reserves: Canoe Lake 165; Canoe Lake 165A; Canoe Lake 165B; Eagles Lake 165C; Onikahp Sahghikansis 165E; Roadside 165F; Wepuskow Sahgaiechan 165D
- Land area: 141.73 km^{2} (54.72 sq mi)

Population (2019)
- On reserve: 1087
- On other land: 63
- Off reserve: 1418
- Total population: 2568

Government
- Chief: Francis Iron
- Council: Robert Opikokew; Bernice Iron; Lenny Iron; Lorne Iron; Wilfred Iron; Walter Coulineur

Tribal Council
- Meadow Lake Tribal Council

Website
- https://www.canoelakefirstnation.com/

Canoe Lake Cree First Nation (Cree: ᓀᐦᐃᔭᐤ ᐘᐹᓯᕽ nêhiyaw-wapâsihk) is a Cree First Nation based in the settlement of Canoe Narrows, Saskatchewan. The Nation is a member of Meadow Lake Tribal Council.

Their reserves include:

- Canoe Lake 165 (includes Canoe Narrows) approximately 340 km (210 mi) northwest of Prince Albert, Saskatchewan.
- Canoe Lake 165A
- Canoe Lake 165B
- Eagles Lake 165C
- Onikahp Sahghikansis 165E
- Roadside 165F
- Wepuskow Sahgaiechan 165D
