= Wepuskow Sahgaiechan 165D =

Indian reserve in Saskatchewan, Canada

Coordinates: 54°54′27″N 108°12′36″W

- Indian reserve
- Wepuskow Sahgaiechan Indian Reserve No. 165D
- Location in Saskatchewan
- First Nation: Canoe Lake
- Country: Canada
- Province: Saskatchewan

Area
  - Total: 5,393.4 ha (13,327 acres)

Wepuskow Sahgaiechan 165D is an Indian reserve of the Canoe Lake Cree First Nation in Saskatchewan. It is on the western shore of Keeley Lake, adjacent to the hamlet of Keeley Lake and about 85 kilometres (53 mi) north of the city of Meadow Lake.

== See also ==
- List of Indian reserves in Saskatchewan
