= Goodsoil =

Village in Saskatchewan, Canada

- Village
- Village of Goodsoil
- Location of Goodsoil in Saskatchewan Goodsoil (Canada)
- Coordinates: 54.399°N 109.238°W
- Country: Canada
- Province: Saskatchewan
- Region: West-central
- Census division: 17
- Rural Municipality: Beaver River No. 622
- Post office Founded: 1 December 1929

Government
  - Type: Municipal
  - Governing body: Goodsoil Village Council
  - Mayor: John Purves
  - Administrator: Vanessa Weber

Area
  - Total: 1.98 km^{2} (0.76 sq mi)

Population (2016)
  - Total: 282
  - Density: 142.6/km^{2} (369/sq mi)
- Time zone: UTC-6 (CST)
- Postal code: S0M 1A0
- Area code: 306
- Highways: Highway 26
- Railways: None
- Website: Village of Goodsoil

Goodsoil (2016 population: 282) is a village in the Canadian province of Saskatchewan within the Rural Municipality of Beaver River No. 622 and Census Division No. 17. The Goodsoil Historical Museum Site (c. 1932–45) is a municipal heritage property on the Canadian Register of Historic Places. It is the western gateway to Meadow Lake Provincial Park.

== Parks and recreation ==
Goodsoil is located about one kilometre south of Meadow Lake Provincial Park's boundary, which is Saskatchewan's largest provincial park. The park has over 25 lakes and features recreational activities including boating, camping, fishing, and swimming.

Eight kilometres west of Goodsoil is Northern Meadows Golf Club, an 18-hole championship course that includes a proshop with rentals and a driving range. The golf course is located on the northern shore of Bousquet Lake along Highway 954.

== History ==
Goodsoil incorporated as a village on 1 January 1960.

== Transportation ==
Goodsoil is located along Highway 26 about five kilometres north of Highway 55. At the north end of town, Highway 26 turns into Highway 224 and continues on into Meadow Lake Provincial Park. Highway 954 begins at the north end of town at the junction with Highway 26 / 224 and heads west into Meadow Lake Provincial Park.

Goodsoil Airport is located 1 nautical mile (1.9 km; 1.2 mi) north north-west of the village along Highway 954.

== Demographics ==
Population history (1981–2016)
Year	Pop.	±%
1981	263	—
1986	269	+2.3%
1991	288	+7.1%
1996	278	−3.5%
2001	284	+2.2%
2006	253	−10.9%
2011	281	+11.1%
2016	282	+0.4%
Source: Statistics Canada via Saskatchewan Bureau of Statistics

In the 2021 Census of Population conducted by Statistics Canada, Goodsoil had a population of 301 living in 128 of its 143 total private dwellings, a change of 6.7% from its 2016 population of 282. With a land area of 1.78 km^{2} (0.69 sq mi), it had a population density of 169.1/km^{2} (438.0/sq mi) in 2021.

In the 2016 Census of Population, the Village of Goodsoil recorded a population of 282 living in 122 of its 156 total private dwellings, a 0.4% change from its 2011 population of 281. With a land area of 1.98 km^{2} (0.76 sq mi), it had a population density of 142.4/km^{2} (368.9/sq mi) in 2016.

== Notable people ==
- Ron Greschner, played for the New York Rangers of the NHL from 1974 to 1990.

== See also ==
- List of communities in Saskatchewan
- List of villages in Saskatchewan
