= Waterhen 130 =

Indian reserve in Saskatchewan, Canada

Coordinates: 54°27′46″N 108°21′57″W

- Indian reserve
- Waterhen Indian Reserve No. 130
- Location in Saskatchewan
- First Nation: Waterhen Lake
- Country: Canada
- Province: Saskatchewan

Area
  - Total: 7,972.2 ha (19,700 acres)

Population (2016)
  - Total: 672
  - Density: 8.43/km^{2} (21.8/sq mi)
- Community Well-Being Index: 51

Waterhen 130 is an Indian reserve of the Waterhen Lake First Nation in Saskatchewan. It is about 39 kilometres (24 mi) north of the community of Meadow Lake on Waterhen Lake. In the 2016 Canadian Census, it recorded a population of 672 living in 196 of its 213 total private dwellings. In the same year, its Community Well-Being index was calculated at 51 of 100, compared to 58.4 for the average First Nations community and 77.5 for the average non-Indigenous community.

== See also ==
- List of Indian reserves in Saskatchewan
