= Greig Lake, Saskatchewan =

Resort village in Saskatchewan, Canada

Greig Lake
- Resort village
- Resort Village of Greig Lake
- Location within Saskatchewan Location within Canada
- Coordinates: 54.446°N 108.7°W
- Country: Canada
- Province: Saskatchewan
- Census division: 17
- Rural municipality: Meadow Lake No. 588
- Incorporated: January 1, 1983

Government
  - Mayor: Dale Brander
  - Governing body: Resort Village Council
  - Administrator: Joan Tatomir

Area (2016)
  - Land: 0.14 km^{2} (0.054 sq mi)

Population (2016)
  - Total: 10
  - Density: 71.4/km^{2} (185/sq mi)
- Time zone: CST
  - Summer (DST): CST
- Area codes: 306 and 639
- Waterway(s): Greig Lake

Greig Lake (2016 population: 10) is a resort village in the Canadian province of Saskatchewan within Census Division No. 17. It is on the eastern shore of Greig Lake in the Rural Municipality of Meadow Lake No. 588. The community is surrounded by Meadow Lake Provincial Park.

== History ==
Greig Lake incorporated as a resort village on January 1, 1983.

== Demographics ==
Population history (1981–2016)
Year	Pop.	±%
1981		—
1986	6	—
1991	17	+183.3%
1996	11	−35.3%
2001	15	+36.4%
2006	20	+33.3%
2011	23	+15.0%
2016	10	−56.5%
Source: Statistics Canada via Saskatchewan Bureau of Statistics

In the 2021 Census of Population conducted by Statistics Canada, Greig Lake had a population of 24 living in 16 of its 44 total private dwellings, a change of 140% from its 2016 population of 10. With a land area of 0.1 km^{2} (0.039 sq mi), it had a population density of 240.0/km^{2} (621.6/sq mi) in 2021.

In the 2016 Census of Population conducted by Statistics Canada, the Resort Village of Greig Lake recorded a population of 10 living in 5 of its 89 total private dwellings, a −56.5% change from its 2011 population of 23. With a land area of 0.14 km^{2} (0.054 sq mi), it had a population density of 71.4/km^{2} (185.0/sq mi) in 2016.

== Government ==
The Resort Village of Greig Lake is governed by an elected municipal council and an appointed administrator. The mayor is Dale Brander and its administrator is Joan Tatomir.

== See also ==
- List of communities in Saskatchewan
- List of resort villages in Saskatchewan
- List of villages in Saskatchewan
- List of summer villages in Alberta
