= Jans Bay =

Hamlet in Saskatchewan, Canada

- Northern hamlet
- Location of Jans Bay in Saskatchewan
- Coordinates: 55.147°N 108.099°W
- Country: Canada
- Province: Saskatchewan
- District: Northern Saskatchewan Administration District
- Census division: 18

Government
  - Mayor: Joyce Gardiner-Maurice
  - Administrator: Holly Opikokew
  - Governing body: Jans Bay Village Council

Area
  - Total: 5.94 km^{2} (2.29 sq mi)

Population (2006)
  - Total: 181
  - Density: 30.5/km^{2} (79/sq mi)
- Time zone: CST
- Postal code: S0M 0K0
- Area code: 306
- Highways: Highway 965

Jans Bay is a northern hamlet in the Canadian province of Saskatchewan. It is on the eastern shore of Canoe Lake and access is from Highway 965.

== Demographics ==
In the 2021 Census of Population conducted by Statistics Canada, Jans Bay had a population of 116 living in 33 of its 43 total private dwellings, a change of −23.7% from its 2016 population of 152. With a land area of 6.09 km^{2} (2.35 sq mi), it had a population density of 19.0/km^{2} (49.3/sq mi) in 2021.

Canada census – Jans Bay community profile

	2021	2011
Population	116 (-23.7% from 2016)	187 (3.3% from 2006)
Land area	6.09 km^{2} (2.35 sq mi)	5.94 km^{2} (2.29 sq mi)
Population density	19/km^{2} (49/sq mi)	31.5/km^{2} (82/sq mi)
Median age	26.8 (M: 28.2, F: 25.8)	17.9 (M: 17.8, F: 18.0)
Private dwellings	43 (total) 33 (occupied)	58 (total)
Median household income

References: 2021 2011

== See also ==
- List of communities in Saskatchewan
