= Pierceland =

Village in Saskatchewan, Canada

Village of Pierceland
- Village
- Location within Saskatchewan Location within Canada
- Coordinates: 54.349°N 109.755°W
- Country: Canada
- Province: Saskatchewan
- Census division: 17
- Rural municipality: Beaver River No. 622
- Post office Founded: 1932 April 01
- Incorporated (Village): N/A
- Incorporated (Town): N/A

Government
  - Mayor: Coral Dale
  - Administrator: Tammy Landry
  - Council Member: Candace Frolick
  - Council Member: Jane Eistetter
  - Council Member: Shannon Wilton

Area
  - Total: 2.74 km^{2} (1.06 sq mi)

Population (2021)
  - Total: 605
  - Density: 220.8/km^{2} (572/sq mi)
- Time zone: CST
- Postal code: S0M 2K0
- Area code: 306
- Highways: Highway 21; Highway 55
- Waterways: Pierce Lake; Lac des Îles
- Website: Official website

Pierceland (2016 population: 598) is a village in the Canadian province of Saskatchewan within the Rural Municipality of Beaver River No. 622 and Census Division No. 17. It is north of the Beaver River on Highway 55.

== History ==
Pierceland incorporated as a village on January 1, 1973.

== Demographics ==
Population history (1981–2016)
Year	Pop.	±%
1981	425	—
1986	501	+17.9%
1991	475	−5.2%
1996	488	+2.7%
2001	449	−8.0%
2006	498	+10.9%
2011	551	+10.6%
2016	598	+8.5%
Source: Statistics Canada via Saskatchewan Bureau of Statistics

In the 2021 Census of Population conducted by Statistics Canada, Pierceland had a population of 605 living in 251 of its 285 total private dwellings, a change of 1.2% from its 2016 population of 598. With a land area of 2.74 km^{2} (1.06 sq mi), it had a population density of 220.8/km^{2} (571.9/sq mi) in 2021.

In the 2016 Census of Population, the Village of Pierceland recorded a population of 598 living in 249 of its 289 total private dwellings, a 7.9% change from its 2011 population of 551. With a land area of 2.69 km^{2} (1.04 sq mi), it had a population density of 222.3/km^{2} (575.8/sq mi) in 2016.

== Notable people ==
- Grant Erickson (born April 28, 1947, in Pierceland) is a retired professional ice hockey player who played 266 games in the World Hockey Association and six games in the National Hockey League.

== See also ==
- Pierceland Central School
- List of communities in Saskatchewan
- List of villages in Saskatchewan
