= Dorintosh =

Village in Saskatchewan, Canada

- Village
- Village of Dorintosh
- Location of Dorintosh in Saskatchewan Dorintosh (Canada)
- Coordinates: 54.352°N 108.626°W
- Country: Canada
- Province: Saskatchewan
- Region: West-central
- Census division: 17
- Rural municipality: Meadow Lake No. 588
- Post office Founded: December 1, 1940

Government
  - Type: Municipal
  - Governing body: Dorintosh Village Council
  - Mayor: John Osborne
  - Administrator: Pam Dallyn

Area
  - Total: 0.88 km^{2} (0.34 sq mi)

Population (2016)
  - Total: 127
  - Density: 151.6/km^{2} (393/sq mi)
- Time zone: UTC-6 (CST)
- Postal code: S0M 0T0
- Area code: 306
- Highways: Highway 4; Highway 779

Dorintosh (2016 population: 134) is a village in the Canadian province of Saskatchewan within the Rural Municipality of Meadow Lake No. 588 and Census Division No. 17. Access is from Highway 4.

The village name is a portmanteau of the names of two members of parliament for North Battleford: Dorise Nielsen (1940–45) and Cameron Ross McIntosh (1925-40).

The Meadow Lake Provincial Park is directly north of Dorintosh along Highway 4.

== History ==
Dorintosh incorporated as a village on January 1, 1989.

== Demographics ==
Population history (1991–2016)
Year	Pop.	±%
1991	100	—
1996	133	+33.0%
2001	125	−6.0%
2006	127	+1.6%
2011	147	+15.7%
2016	134	−8.8%
Source: Statistics Canada via Saskatchewan Bureau of Statistics

In the 2021 Census of Population conducted by Statistics Canada, Dorintosh had a population of 107 living in 53 of its 58 total private dwellings, a change of −20.1% from its 2016 population of 134. With a land area of 0.28 km^{2} (0.11 sq mi), it had a population density of 382.1/km^{2} (989.7/sq mi) in 2021.

In the 2016 Census of Population, the Village of Dorintosh recorded a population of 134 living in 60 of its 74 total private dwellings, a −9.7% change from its 2011 population of 147. With a land area of 0.88 km^{2} (0.34 sq mi), it had a population density of 152.3/km^{2} (394.4/sq mi) in 2016.

== See also ==
- List of communities in Saskatchewan
- List of villages in Saskatchewan
