= Rural Municipality of Meadow Lake No. 588 =

Rural municipality in Saskatchewan, Canada

Meadow Lake No. 588
- Rural municipality
- Rural Municipality of Meadow Lake No. 588
- Location of the RM of Meadow Lake No. 588 in Saskatchewan
- Coordinates: 54.169°N 108.337°W
- Country: Canada
- Province: Saskatchewan
- Census division: 17
- SARM division: 6
- Federal riding: Desnethé—Missinippi—Churchill River
- Provincial riding: Meadow Lake
- Formed: February 1, 1976

Government
  - Reeve: Dale Sheppard
  - Governing body: RM of Meadow Lake No. 588 Council
  - Administrator: Richard Levesque
  - Office location: Meadow Lake

Area (2016)
  - Land: 6,306.17 km^{2} (2,434.83 sq mi)

Population (2016)
  - Total: 2,501
  - Density: 0.4/km^{2} (1.0/sq mi)
- Time zone: CST
  - Summer (DST): CST
- Postal code: S9X 1Y5
- Area codes: 306 and 639
- Website: Official website

The Rural Municipality of Meadow Lake No. 588 (2016 population: 2,501) is a rural municipality (RM) in the Canadian province of Saskatchewan within Census Division No. 17 and SARM Division No. 6.

== History ==
The RM of Meadow Lake No. 588 incorporated as a rural municipality on February 1, 1976.

== Geography ==
=== Communities and localities ===
The following urban municipalities are surrounded by the RM.

Cities

- Meadow Lake

Villages

- Dorintosh

Resort Villages

- Greig Lake

The following unincorporated communities are within the RM.

Organized hamlets

- South Waterhen Lake (54.4629°N 108.5263°W)

The RM also surrounds several First Nations Indian reserves (Eagles Lake 165C, Flying Dust First Nation No. 105, Meadow Lake 105A, Thunderchild First Nation 115D, and Waterhen 130).

== Demographics ==
Population history (1981–2016)
Year	Pop.	±%
1981	2,514	—
1986	2,503	−0.4%
1991	2,445	−2.3%
1996	2,612	+6.8%
2001	2,761	+5.7%
2006	2,627	−4.9%
2011	2,677	+1.9%
2016	2,501	−6.6%
Source: Statistics Canada via Saskatchewan Bureau of Statistics

In the 2021 Census of Population conducted by Statistics Canada, the RM of Meadow Lake No. 588 had a population of 2,553 living in 988 of its 1,215 total private dwellings, a change of 3.1% from its 2016 population of 2,476. With a land area of 6,231.27 km^{2} (2,405.91 sq mi), it had a population density of 0.4/km^{2} (1.1/sq mi) in 2021.

In the 2016 Census of Population, the RM of Meadow Lake No. 588 recorded a population of 2,501 living in 945 of its 1,239 total private dwellings, a −6.2% change from its 2011 population of 2,667. With a land area of 6,306.17 km^{2} (2,434.83 sq mi), it had a population density of 0.4/km^{2} (1.0/sq mi) in 2016.

== Government ==
The RM of Meadow Lake No. 588 is governed by an elected municipal council and an appointed administrator that meets on the second Monday of every month. The reeve of the RM is Dale Sheppard while its administrator is Richard Levesque. The RM's office is located in Meadow Lake.

== Attractions ==
- Meadow Lake Provincial Park – the largest provincial park in Saskatchewan encompassing over 1,600 km^{2} (620 sq mi)
- Saint Cyr Hills Trails Recreation Site (54.2044°N 108.1698°W) – a year-round provincial recreation site centred around Ski Lodge Lake. The park, which is maintained by St. Cyr Trails Club, has hiking, biking, snowshoeing, and cross country ski trails. Access is from Island Hill Rd, which is off Highway 55.
- Beaver River Recreation Site – a small park along Highway 4 with access to Beaver River
- Island Lake Recreation Site – a campground at Island Lake
- Nesset Lake Recreation Site – protected land at Nesset Lake
