= Waterhen Lake First Nation =

Cree First Nation band government

Waterhen Lake First Nation (Cree: ᓯᐦᑭᐦᑊ ᓵᑲᐦᐃᑲᓂᕽ sihkihp sâkahikanihk) is a Cree First Nation band government located in northwestern Saskatchewan, Canada. As of October 2018 the total membership of the Waterhen Lake First Nation was 2,053. There were 983 members living on reserve, 2 on Crown Land and 1,068 members living off reserve. The First Nation is a member of the MLTC Program Services, a regional tribal Chiefs' Council. The First Nation is also a signatory to the Adhesion to Treaty 6 in 1921.

== Government ==
The current elected leadership of the community consists of Chief Blaine Fiddler (2nd Term - Former Councillor) and six Councillors: Dean Martell (1st Term), Carol Bernard (Former Chief - 1st Term Council), Gordon Ernest (1st Term), Karnella Fiddler (3rd Term), David Fleury (3rd Term), and Peter Bouvier (2nd Term). Their current elected term expires on December 23, 2024. Waterhen Lake First Nation is currently under Indian Act Election codes and thus has a new election every 2 years - rather than 3 or 4 as most democratic institutions operate.

Assisting the elected officials in their duties is the current Band Manager Calvin Opikokew.

== Reserves ==
Waterhen 130 is an Indian reserve about 39 kilometres (24 mi) north of the city of Meadow Lake. It is 7,972.0 ha. in size. It is the sole reserve and community of the Waterhen Lake First Nation.

Within the reserve community there is a store, an arena, a water treatment facility, a school, a clinic, and Band and postal offices. The community is home to a health centre, a nursery to grade twelve school called Waweyekisik, a confectionery, and numerous other community facilities.

The community's economy relies heavily on the forestry industry in the region, as well as the tourism and farming industries. Waterhen Lake First Nation members have many established business operations including the band-owned M & N Resort on the shores of Waterhen Lake, eco-tourism guiding businesses.

With a population of approximately 1896 members, the Waterhen Lake First Nation serves its band members in the form of capital projects, health and social programming and cultural activities.

== History ==
In August 2022, they became a signatory of the Buffalo Treaty.
