= Tourism in Saskatchewan =

Saskatchewan's tourism sector generated over $2 billion in revenue, with more than 12 million visitors in 2022. There are numerous heritages and cultural attractions in the Canadian province of Saskatchewan. Museums, dinosaur digs, aboriginal cultural and heritage sites, art galleries, professional sport venues, spas, handcraft, antique and tea shops, agricultural tours, theatre, and archaeological sites comprise over 600 varied Saskatchewan institutions.

There are two national parks located in the province of Saskatchewan: Grasslands National Park and Prince Albert National Park. There are also four National Historic Sites operated by Parks Canada in Saskatchewan including Fort Walsh National Historic Site, Batoche National Historic Site, Fort Battleford National Historic Site and Motherwell Homestead National Historic Site. There are 37 provincial parks, provincial recreation areas, natural areas, and a Heritage rangeland are also protected on a provincial level.

Saskatchewan also has two major cities, Regina and Saskatoon. Regina is home to the Royal Canadian Mounted Police (RCMP) Academy at Depot Division where visitors can view the Sergeant Major's Parade held weekdays and the seasonal Sunset Retreat Ceremonies. Regina is also home to the RCMP Heritage Centre which opened in 2007.

== Cities ==
=== Saskatoon ===
Saskatoon is Saskatchewan's largest city, with a population of 317,480 in the census metropolitan area. It is located on the Trans-Canada's Yellowhead Highway #16 and is centrally located within the province. According to estimated figures by Tourism Saskatchewan, tourism in Saskatoon is worth over $600 million. This accounts for one-third of the $1.6 billion in travel expenditures throughout Saskatchewan. Located in the Meewasin Valley on the South Saskatchewan River, Saskatoon is the business and cultural hub of the province as well as home to the University of Saskatchewan and Remai Modern Art Gallery of Saskatchewan. Saskatoon has a diverse music and art scene, hosting the annual Saskatchewan Jazz Festival. Known as HUB City, Paris of the Prairie's, and POW City (potash, oil, wheat).

=== Regina ===
Regina is Saskatchewan's second largest city, with a population of 236,481 in the census metropolitan area. It is also the capital of Saskatchewan. Regina is the hub for business and tourism in southern Saskatchewan. Regina has a rich culture in music, theatre and dance, supported by the University of Regina.

== Museums ==
- The Addison Sod House is a Saskatchewan homestead site over a hundred years old made of grass or sod has been designated as a National Historic Site of Canada. This sod home was used by early homesteader James Addison and his family 10 miles north of Kindersley and 6.5 miles east on Highway 21. His property held a barn, two sheds, shelterbelt as well as a dugout.
- The Ancient Echoes Interpretive Centre is an indoor/outdoor interpretive centre, displaying, taxidermy, First Nation History, Palaeontology, and Prairie Grassland Ecological history of the Coal Ravine and the Eagle Creek area, near the town of Herschel 37 km northwest of Rosetown.
- The Bateman Historical Museum
- Sukanen Ship Pioneer Village and Museum
  - The Diefenbaker House is the childhood home of Prime Minister of Canada, John Diefenbaker-turned-museum located in the city of Prince Albert. The museum building was built in 1912 and purchased in 1947 by the Prime Minister of Canada, John Diefenbaker and his then wife Edna Diefenbaker. It was closed in 2001 and moved to the Sukanen Ship and Pioneer Museum in 2004.
- The Mendel Art Gallery was a major creative cultural centre in City Park, Saskatoon, opened in 1964. Housing a permanent collection of works of local, regional and national significance, including works by the Group of Seven, the Mendel is also known for its public programs for all ages. It closed in 2015 and was replaced by the Remai Art Gallery of Saskatchewan.
- The Outlook & District Heritage Museum is located in downtown Outlook. The museum is located in the former CP Rail Station and houses over 3,000 items that highlight the lives of the pioneers and the community that was built on the banks of the South Saskatchewan River.
- The Saskatchewan Western Development Museum is a network of four museums in Saskatchewan preserving and recording the social and economic development of the province. The museum has branches in Moose Jaw, North Battleford, Saskatoon, and Yorkton. Each branch focuses on a different theme: transportation, agriculture, economy, and people, respectively.
- T.rex Discovery Centre,

== National and provincial parks ==
- The Athabasca Sand Dunes Provincial Park is a unique geophysical land feature in the Boreal Shield ecosystems of Saskatchewan. Its 400 to 1,500 metre long dunes are the most northerly in the world.
- The Buffalo Pound Provincial Park is a provincial park located in southern Saskatchewan about 25 km northeast of the city of Moose Jaw.
- The Cannington Manor Provincial Park is a historic park which was established in 1882 by Captain Edward Michell Pierce (d. June 20, 1888) as an aristocratic English colony. Pierce's death, drought, and the placement of a CP railway 10 kilometres away instead of through the town, all contributed to the demise of the colony.
- The Grasslands National Park is one of Canada's newer national parks and is located in southern Saskatchewan along the Montana border. Part of the national park system, the park aims to protect representative areas of the country's 39 natural regions.

== Regional parks ==
- The Carlton Trail Regional Park is a family recreation and activity centre and features a nine-hole golf course, a stocked fishing lake, a public beach, camping facilities with 75 electrical sites as well as food services, a picnic area, playground, ball diamonds and hiking trails.
- The Victoria Park was designed by Canada's first resident landscape architect, Frederick Todd. It hosts the Regina Folk Festival in the summer.

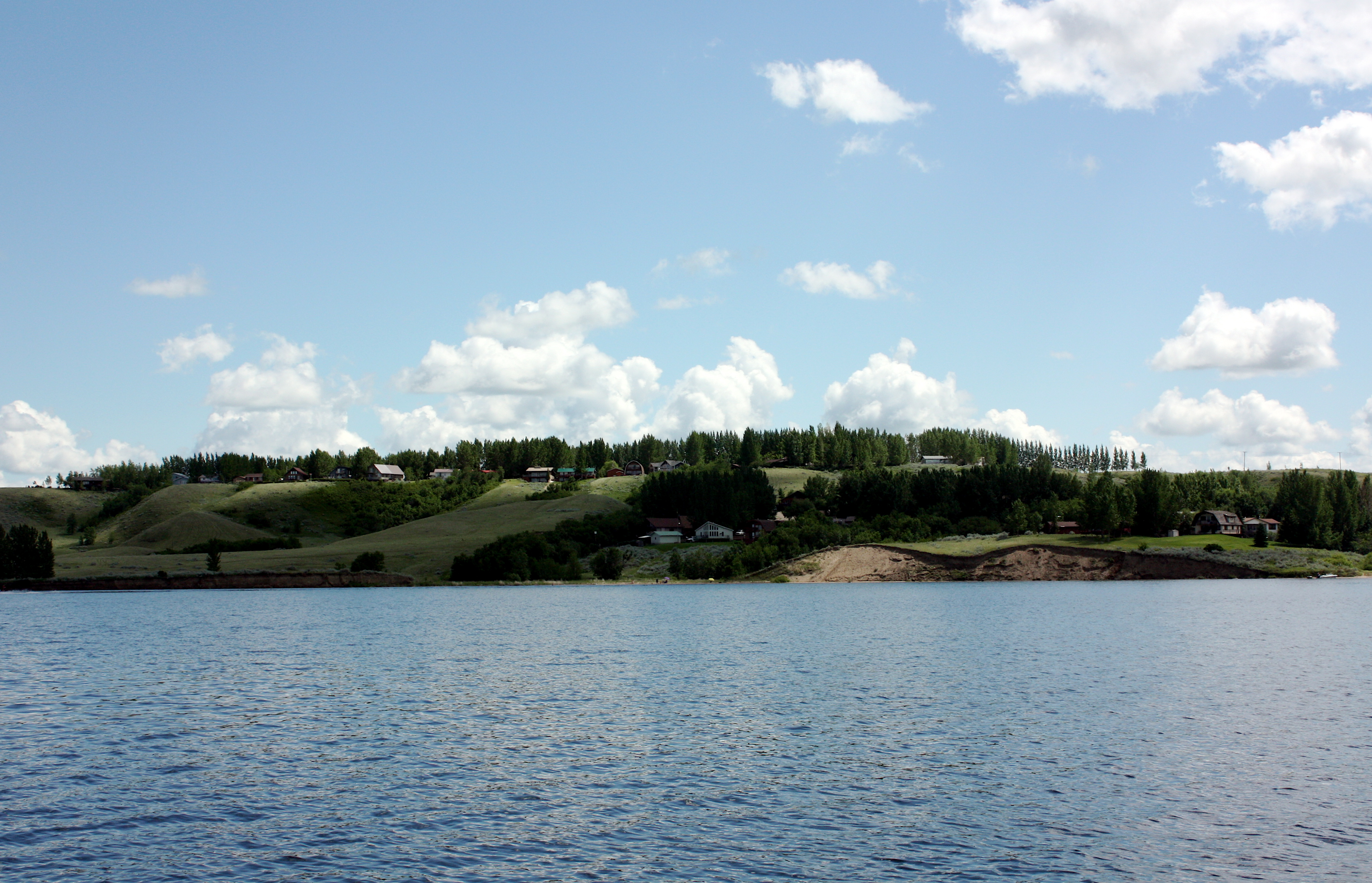
Showing Palliser Park cabin development

- The Palliser Regional Park is located near the town of Riverhurst next to Lake Diefenbaker. There are over 300 full service, electrical and water, and no service camping lots as well as cabin development. The park has public washrooms and showers. There is a full service marina and nine-hole golf course and a heated pool that offers swimming lessons in July and August. The park is also home to the Mainstay Inn, a restaurant and hotel. There are many sandy beaches and the park also has many playgrounds. It also has a concession and mini golf course.

== Railway ==
- The Saskatchewan Railway Museum located in Saskatoon, operated by the Saskatchewan Railroad Historical Society.

== Significant events in Saskatchewan tourism ==
- Corner Gas, a television show set in the make-believe town of Dog River, Saskatchewan.

== See also ==
- Tourism in Canada
- Festivals in Saskatchewan
- List of Saskatchewan parks
- Tourism Saskatchewan
- Tourism Saskatoon
