= Carmichael (surname) =

Carmichael is a Scottish surname. It is derived from Carmichael, in Lanarkshire. This place name is composed of two word elements: the British caer ("fort") and the personal name Michael. It is also used as an anglicisation of MacGilleMhicheil. Notable people with the surname include:

- Ailsa Carmichael, Lady Carmichael, Scottish judge
- Al Carmichael (1928–2019), American football player and stunt performer
- Alexander Carmichael, collector and author of Carmina Gadelica
- Alison Carmichael (c. 1792–1885), novelist and writer
- Alistair Carmichael, Scottish Liberal Democratic politician
- Amy Carmichael, missionary to Tamil Nadu, India
- Angus Carmichael (1925–2013), Scottish footballer
- Archibald Drummond Carmichael (1859–?), industrial chemist in Broken Hill, Australia
- Caitlin Carmichael, American child actress
- Cartwright Carmichael, American basketball player
- Chris Carmichael (cyclist), cycling trainer for Lance Armstrong and others
- Chris Carmichael (musician), American violin, cello player
- Colin Carmichael, Green Party of Ontario candidate for the electoral district of Cambridge
- David Carmichael (railway engineer) Scottish railway engineer
- David Carmichael, American pastry chef
- Dillon Carmichael, American singer
- Dugald Carmichael, Scottish botanist and officer
- Duncan Carmichael (born 1870), British trade unionist and socialist activist
- Duncan Carmichael (cricketer) (1915–1984), English cricketer
- Elizabeth Carmichael, English artist active between 1768 and 1820
- Emily Carmichael (novelist), American novelist
- Emily Carmichael (filmmaker), American filmmaker
- Franklin Carmichael, Canadian artist
- Gene Carmichael, American businessman and politician
- George Carmichael, bisop-elect of Glasgow
- Geraldine Elizabeth Carmichael, American businesswoman and fraudster
- Gershom Carmichael, Scottish philosopher
- Greg Carmichael, English guitarist
- Harold Carmichael, played for the American football team, the Philadelphia Eagles
- Henry Carmichael (1846–1924), physician
- Hoagy Carmichael, American singer and songwriter
- Howard Carmichael, New Zealand theoretical physicist (quantum optics)
- Ian Carmichael, British actor
- Jackie Carmichael (born 1990), American basketball player
- James Carmichael (disambiguation), several people
- Jerrod Carmichael, American comedian of The Carmichael Show
- Jesse Carmichael, keyboardist and backing singer of Maroon 5, a rock band from Los Angeles
- Joel Carmichael, historical essayist, editor and translator
- John Carmichael (disambiguation), several people
- Laura Carmichael, English actress, played Lady Edith Crawley in historical drama Downton Abbey
- Leonard Carmichael, American educator, associated with Tufts University
- Lindsey Carmichael, American Paralympian archer
- Mary Grant Carmichael (1851 – 17 March 1935), English composer
- Meldon Carmichael, American politician
- Neil Carmichael (Conservative politician), Conservative MP for Stroud
- Neil Carmichael, Baron Carmichael of Kelvingrove, Glasgow Labour MP (1962–1983)
- Nelson Carmichael, American Olympic freestyle skier
- Otto Carmichael, American journalist
- Peter Carmichael (disambiguation), multiple people
- Ralph Carmichael (1927–2021), American composer and arranger
- Rebekah Carmichael (c. 1766–1823), British poet
- Richard H. Carmichael (1913–1983), United States Army general
- Ricky Carmichael, professional motocross racer
- Robert Daniel Carmichael, American mathematician
- Robert P. Carmichael, one of the inventors of the Precooled jet engine
- Sandy Carmichael, Scottish rugby player who also played for the British Lions
- Stokely Carmichael, Trinidadian/American Black activist
- Thomas Gibson-Carmichael, 1st Baron Carmichael, a Scottish Liberal politician and colonial administrator
- Videt Carmichael (born 1950), American politician

== Fictional characters ==
- Abbie Carmichael, ADA from the Law & Order franchise
- Anthony Carmichael, profiterole chef and "Music 2000" contestant who performs the song "The Rapping Song" in Series 2, Episode 1 of Look Around You
- Atlas Jericho "A.J." Carmichael is an Shubunkin goldfish inside a robotic body in the TV series The Umbrella Academy
- Caroline "Pudge" Carmichael, character from Shag: The Movie, played by Annabeth Gish
- Charles Carmichael, alias of Chuck Bartowski on the TV series Chuck
- Chloe Carmichael, character from The Fairly OddParents
- Joseph Carmichael, character from the film The Changeling
- Lori Carmichael, character from Mary Stanton's Unicorns of Balinor book series
- Lucy Carmichael, character from the US sitcom The Lucy Show
- Patricia Carmichael, DCS, Head of AC.3 in Line of Duty, played by Anna Maxwell Martin.
- Ron Carmichael, character from Jim Butcher's The Dresden Files book series
- Sam Carmichael, character from the film franchise Mamma Mia!
- Susie Carmichael, character from the Nickelodeon TV series Rugrats and All Grown Up!
- Zara Carmichael, character from the BBC soap opera Doctors
