= Carmichael =

Carmichael may refer to:

- Carmichael (surname)

== Other ==
- Clan Carmichael, Scottish clan
- Carmichael, California, United States
- Carmichael coal mine, a proposed mine in Central Queensland, Australia
- Carmichael (crater), a lunar crater
- Carmichael (manufacturer), Worcester manufacturer of fire engines
- Rural Municipality of Carmichael No. 109, a rural municipality in Saskatchewan
- Carmichael number, a special kind of number in number theory named for mathematician Robert Carmichael
- Carmichael, Saskatchewan, Canada
- Carmichael, South Lanarkshire, a village in Scotland
- J and C Carmichael, Scottish engineering company
- Carmichael College, an educational institution in Rangpur, Bangladesh.
- Carmichael (Bahamas Parliament constituency)

== See also ==
- Karmichael Hunt New Zealand-born Australian professional multi-code football player
