= List of generating stations in Saskatchewan =

This is a list of power stations in Saskatchewan, Canada.

In 2024, the total installed capacity of generation was 5,355 MW with 39% from natural gas, 24% from coal, 21% from hydro, 11% from wind, and 5% from other sources such as solar and waste heat plants. With a notable 10% decrease of coal-fueled power, as well as an over doubling of wind power from 5% of the power mix in 2018.

== Owned by SaskPower ==
Name	Location	Fuel	Generating units (date)	Capacity
Boundary Dam Power Station	Estevan	Coal	one 62 MW unit (commissioned in 1959, retired in 2013) one 61 MW unit (commissioned in 1959, retired in 2014) one 139 MW unit (commissioned in 1969, replaced in 2014) one 139 MW unit (commissioned in 1970) one 139 MW unit (commissioned in 1973) one 288 MW unit (commissioned in 1977)	672 MW
Centennial Wind Power Facility	Near Swift Current	Wind	eighty-three 1.8 MW turbines (2006)	150 MW
Charlot River Power Station	Near Uranium City	Hydroelectric	two 5 MW units (1980)	10 MW
Coteau Creek Hydroelectric Station	Near Elbow	Hydroelectric	three 62 MW units (1968)	186 MW
Cory Cogeneration Station	Nutrien Cory Mine Near Saskatoon	Natural gas	three 76 MW units (2003)	228 MW
Cypress Wind Power Facility	Near Gull Lake	Wind power	nine 660 kW turbines (2002) seven 660 kW turbines (2003)	11 MW
E.B. Campbell Hydroelectric Station	Near Nipawin	Hydroelectric	six 34 MW units (1963/64) two 42 MW units (1966)	289 MW
Ermine Power Station	Near Kerrobert	Natural gas	two 46 MW units (2009)	92 MW
Island Falls Hydroelectric Station	Near Sandy Bay	Hydroelectric	two units (1928) three units (1930) one unit (1937) one unit (1939) one unit (1948) one unit (1959)	111 MW
Landis Power Station	Near Landis	Natural gas	one 79 MW unit (1975)	79 MW
Meadow Lake Power Station	Near Meadow Lake	Natural gas	one 44 MW unit (1984)	44 MW
Nipawin Hydroelectric Station	Near Nipawin	Hydroelectric	one 85 MW unit (1985) two 85 MW units (1986)	255 MW
Poplar River Power Station	Near Coronach	Coal	one 291 MW unit (1981) one 291 MW unit (1983)	582 MW
Shand Power Station	Estevan	Coal	one 276 MW unit (1992)	276 MW
Queen Elizabeth Power Station	Saskatoon	Natural gas	two 59 MW units (1958/59) one 95 MW unit (1972) six 28 MW units (2002) three 36 MW units (2010)	634 MW
Waterloo Hydroelectric Station	Near Uranium City	Hydroelectric	one 8 MW unit (1961)	8 MW
Wellington Hydroelectric Station	Near Uranium City	Hydroelectric	one 2.4 MW unit (1939) one 2.4 MW unit (1959)	5 MW
Yellowhead Power Station	North Battleford	Natural gas	three 46 MW units (2010)	138 MW

== Owned by non-Crown corporations ==
Name	Owner	Location	Fuel	Generating units (date)	Capacity
Alameda Heat Recovery Facility	NRGreen Power	Alameda	Waste Heat	one 5 MW unit (2008)	5 MW
Awasis Solar Facility	Cowessess First Nation & Elemental Energy	Regina	Solar	2022	10 MW
Blue Hill Wind Facility	Algonquin Power	Herbert	Wind power	35 5 MW turbines (2022)	175 MW
Estlin Heat Recovery Facility	NRGreen Power	Estlin	Waste Heat	one 5 MW unit (2008)	5 MW
Golden South Wind Facility	Potentia Renewables	Assiniboia	Wind power	50 4 MW turbines (2022)	200 MW
Highfield Solar Facility	Saturn Power	Rural Municipality of Coulee, SK	Solar	2021	10 MW
Kerrobert Heat Recovery Facility	NRGreen Power	Kerrobert	Waste Heat	one 5 MW unit (2006)	5 MW
Loreburn Heat Recovery Facility	NRGreen Power	Loreburn	Waste Heat	one 5 MW unit (2008)	5 MW
Meridian Cogeneration Station	Stanley Energy	Lloydminster	Natural gas	three 70 MW units (2000)	210 MW
Morse Wind Facility	Algonquin Power	Near Swift Current	Wind power	ten 2.3 MW turbines (2015)	23 MW
North Battleford Generating Station	Northland Power	Near North Battleford	Natural gas	one 170 MW unit (2013) one 90 MW unit (2013)	260 MW
Pesâkâstêw Solar Facility	Pesâkâstêw Solar Limited Partnership	Weyburn	Solar	2022	10 MW
Riverhurst Wind Facility	Capstone Infrastructure	Riverhurst	Wind power	3 3.3 MW turbines	10 MW
Red Lily Wind Facility	Concord Pacific	Near Moosomin	Wind power	sixteen 1.65 MW turbines (2011)	27 MW
Spy Hill Generating Station	Northland Power	Near Esterhazy	Natural gas	two 43 MW units (2011)	86 MW
SunBridge Wind Power Facility	Suncor & Enbridge	Near Swift Current	Wind power	seventeen 660 kW turbines (2002)	11 MW
Western Lily Wind Power Facility	Gaia Power	Near Grenfell	Wind power	ten 2 MW turbines (2019)	20 MW

== See also ==
- Energy in Canada
- List of power stations in Canada
- Coal mining in Saskatchewan
