= Athabasca System Hydroelectric Stations =

Hydroelectric stations in Saskatchewan, Canada

- Country: Canada
- Location: Near Uranium City, Saskatchewan
- Coordinates: 59°37′40″N 109°01′07″W
- Status: Operational
- Commission date: 1939-1980
- Owner: SaskPower

Power generation
- Nameplate capacity: 23 MW

Athabasca System Hydroelectric Stations are a series of small run-of-the-river hydroelectricity stations on the Charlot River in the Athabasca region owned by SaskPower, located near Uranium City, Saskatchewan, Canada. Access to the stations is from the Charlot River Airport and Highway 999.

== Description ==
The system consists of the:

- Wellington Power Station (59°37′40″N 109°01′07″W) — a two unit station generating 4.8 MW (the first 2.4 MW unit was commissioned in 1939 and the second in 1959).
- Waterloo Power Station (59°37′57″N 109°03′24″W) — a single 8 MW unit commissioned in 1961 and located downstream of the Wellington Power Station.
- Charlot River Power Station (59°36′45″N 109°06′51″W) — a two unit station generating 10 MW commissioned in 1980 and located downstream of the Waterloo Power Station.

== See also ==
- List of generating stations in Saskatchewan
