= Landis Power Station =

Natural gas power station in Saskatchewan, Canada

- Country: Canada
- Location: Landis, Saskatchewan
- Coordinates: 52°11′57″N 108°27′6″W
- Status: Operational
- Commission date: 1975
- Owner: SaskPower

Thermal power station
- Primary fuel: Natural gas
- Turbine technology: Gas turbine

Power generation
- Nameplate capacity: 78 MW

Landis Power Station is a natural gas-fired station owned by SaskPower, located in Landis, Saskatchewan, Canada and operated as a peaking plant.

== Description ==
The powerplant consists of:

- 1 - 78 MW unit, commissioned in 1975 and refurbished in 1999

== See also ==
- List of generating stations in Saskatchewan
