= Antelope Lake (Saskatchewan) =

Lake in Saskatchewan, Canada

- Location in Saskatchewan Antelope Lake (Canada)
- Location: RM of Webb No. 138, Saskatchewan
- Coordinates: 50.2667°N 108.4007°W
- Type: Endorheic lake
- Part of: Saskatchewan River drainage basin
- Primary inflows: Bridge Creek
- River sources: Cypress Hills
- Primary outflows: None
- Basin countries: Canada
- Max. length: 6.4 km (4.0 mi)
- Max. width: 3.4 km (2.1 mi)
- Surface area: 612.3 ha (1,513 acres)
- Max. depth: 11.3 m (37 ft)
- Shore length^{1}: 11.5 km (7.1 mi)
- Surface elevation: 701 m (2,300 ft)
- Settlements: None
- ^{1} Shore length is not a well-defined measure.

Antelope Lake is an endorheic lake in the south-west corner of the Canadian province of Saskatchewan. The lake is in the Prairie Pothole Region of North America, which extends throughout three Canadian provinces and five U.S. states, and within Palliser's Triangle and the Great Plains ecoregion of Canada. The primary inflow for the lake is Bridge Creek, which originates to the south in the Cypress Hills at an elevation of over 1,000 metres (3,300 ft) above sea level.

The lake is about 20 kilometres (12 mi) north of Gull Lake and the Trans-Canada Highway, just off Highway 37. There are no communities along the lake's shore — only a regional park. About 20 kilometres (12 mi) south-east of the lake along the Trans-Canada Highway is a nature reserve called Webb National Wildlife Area.

== Antelope Lake Regional Park ==
Antelope Lake Regional Park (50.2778°N 108.4146°W) is located on the western shore of Antelope Lake. The park was founded on 17 October 1972 when the Regional Park Board bought the land from Mr and Mrs Earl Hemsworth. The park is bordered by hillsides, has a 9-hole golf course, campground, ball diamond, rental hall, horseshoe pits, volleyball net, man-made swimming pond, two shower houses, and a sandy beach. While the lake is not suitable for fishing, there is a man-made rainbow trout pond in the park.

The golf course is a 2,566-yard, par 34 sand greens course and the campground has 52 campsites.

== See also ==
- List of lakes of Saskatchewan
- List of protected areas of Saskatchewan
- Tourism in Saskatchewan
