= Queen Elizabeth Power Station =

Natural gas power station in Saskatchewan, Canada

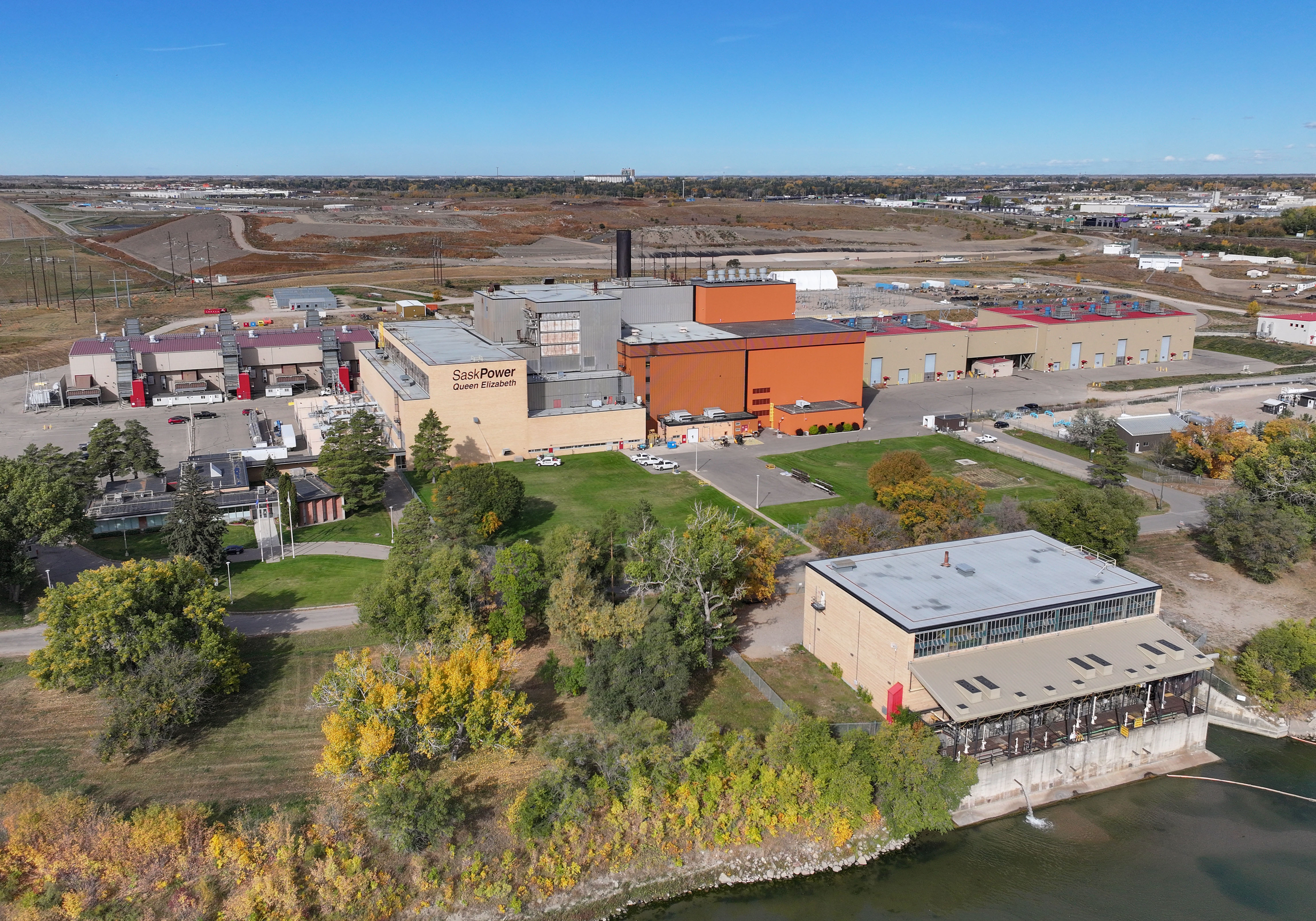
- Country: Canada
- Location: 2211 Spadina Crescent West; Saskatoon, Saskatchewan
- Coordinates: 52°5′43″N 106°42′22″W
- Status: Operational
- Commission date: 1959
- Owner: SaskPower

Thermal power station
- Primary fuel: Natural gas
- Turbine technology: Steam turbine

Power generation
- Nameplate capacity: 634 MW

Queen Elizabeth Power Station is a natural gas-fired station owned by SaskPower, located in Saskatoon, Saskatchewan, Canada. The station was called the South Saskatchewan River Generating Station but renamed the Queen Elizabeth Power Station at the time of commissioning in 1959.

== Description ==
The Queen Elizabeth Power Station consists of:

- one 60 MW and one 63 MW units (commissioned in 1959)
- one 95 MW unit (commissioned in 1971)
- six 25 MW Hitachi combustion gas turbines with once-through steam generators used to recover excess heat and reduce greenhouse gas emissions using combined-cycle technology(commissioned in June 2002)
- three 36 MW Hitachi gas turbine units (commissioned 2010) at a cost of $240 million
- three other 36 MW gas turbine units (commissioned 2016) and a steam turbine

Boilers were supplied by Foster Wheeler and Babcock & Wilcox, and Once Through Steam Generators by Innovative Steam Technologies. The steam turbines were supplied by Brown, Boveri & Cie, English Electric and Hitachi.

== See also ==
- List of generating stations in Saskatchewan
