= Senator Carmichael =

Senator Carmichael may refer to:

- Archibald H. Carmichael (1864–1947), Alabama State Senate
- Gene Carmichael (1927–2014), South Carolina State Senate
- Mitch Carmichael (born 1960), West Virginia State Senate
- Videt Carmichael (born 1950), Mississippi State Senate
