= Ermine Power Station =

Natural gas power station in Saskatchewan, Canada

- Country: Canada
- Location: Oakdale No. 320, near Kerrobert, Saskatchewan
- Coordinates: 51°51′28″N 109°02′00″W
- Status: Commissioned
- Commission date: 2009
- Owner: SaskPower

Thermal power station
- Primary fuel: Natural gas
- Turbine technology: Gas turbine

Power generation
- Units operational: 3
- Nameplate capacity: 136 MW

Ermine Power Station is a natural gas-fired station owned by SaskPower, about 10 kilometres (6.2 mi) southeast of Kerrobert, Saskatchewan, Canada and operated as a peaking plant. Built near the existing Ermine Switching Station. By doing this, it lowered project costs and reduced the need for new power lines. The project underwent environmental assessment in 2008. In June 2025, a simple cycle natural gas turbine was added to the station. This is the facility’s third turbine, increasing its power generation by an additional 46 megawatts (MW) of power

== Description ==
The Ermine Power Station consists of:

- 3 x 46 MW units

== See also ==
- List of generating stations in Saskatchewan
