= Rural Municipality of Gull Lake No. 139 =

Rural municipality in Saskatchewan, Canada

Gull Lake No. 139
- Rural municipality
- Rural Municipality of Gull Lake No. 139

- Location of the RM of Gull Lake No. 139 in Saskatchewan
- Coordinates: 50.149°N 108.661°W
- Country: Canada
- Province: Saskatchewan
- Census division: 8
- SARM division: 3
- Formed: January 1, 1913

Government
  - Reeve: Jason Craig
  - Governing body: RM of Gull Lake No. 139 Council: Div 1: Dennis Kirk; Div 2: Kenneth Mitchell; Div 3: Craig Todd; Div 4: Rob Toney; Div 5: Thomas Bucheler Div 6: Collette Jones
  - Chief Administrative Officer: Jeanette Kerr
  - Office location: Gull Lake

Area (2021)
  - Land: 828.48 km^{2} (319.88 sq mi)

Population (2021)
  - Total: 185
  - Density: 0.2/km^{2} (0.52/sq mi)
- Time zone: CST
  - Summer (DST): CST
- Area codes: 306 and 639
- Website: Official website

The Rural Municipality of Gull Lake No. 139 (2016 population: 201) is a rural municipality (RM) in the Canadian province of Saskatchewan within Census Division No. 8 and SARM Division No. 3. It is located in the southwest portion of the province.

== History ==
The RM of Gull Lake No. 139 incorporated as a rural municipality on January 1, 1913.

=== Early history and settlement ===
The area surrounding the present-day Rural Municipality of Gull Lake No. 139 has historical connections to Indigenous peoples, including the Assiniboine, Cree, and Blackfoot. The region was subsequently associated with nineteenth-century exploration of the Canadian Prairies, including the Palliser expedition of 1857–1860.

Large-scale ranching preceded widespread agricultural settlement in the area. The 76 Ranch, established near Gull Lake in 1887, was one of several extensive ranching operations developed by Sir John Lister-Kaye's Canadian Agricultural, Coal and Colonization Company. The Gull Lake ranch comprised approximately 10,000 acres, and its ranch house, constructed in 1888, became one of the oldest surviving buildings in southwestern Saskatchewan.

During the early twentieth century, the region experienced a transition from large ranching operations toward grain farming and agricultural settlement. Financial difficulties among ranching companies, the sale of grazing lands for cultivation, and heavy cattle losses during the winter of 1906–1907 contributed to the decline or downsizing of several large ranches.

In 1905, the Gull Lake portion of the 76 Ranch was sold to American land developers Conrad and Price, who surveyed and subdivided the townsite. The community subsequently experienced rapid settlement and commercial development between 1906 and 1912. Gull Lake attained town status in 1911, shortly before the surrounding rural municipality was established.

=== Establishment of local government ===
The development of rural municipal government in Saskatchewan followed an earlier system of local government through local improvement districts. These districts were responsible for such functions as establishing roads and protecting settlements from prairie fires before the expansion of the rural municipality system.

The first recorded meeting of Local Improvement District No. 139 was held on January 2, 1911. J. Ohlheiser was appointed chairman, and E. E. Spackman was appointed secretary-treasurer. The district administered the area during 1911 and 1912, before its reorganization as a rural municipality.

The Rural Municipality of Gull Lake No. 139 was incorporated on January 1, 1913. Its first council meeting was held on January 6, 1913, following the final meeting of Local Improvement District No. 139. T. J. Armstrong became the municipality's first reeve, and C. Lochead served as secretary-treasurer.

=== Early municipal administration ===
During its first years, the municipality developed permanent administrative facilities and procedures. In May 1914, a meeting held at Whipps Hall in the Village of Tompkins authorized the purchase of a lot in Gull Lake for the construction of a building containing a municipal office, hall, and safe.

The municipality continued to develop its administrative facilities during the following decades. Its first adding machine was purchased in 1920, a vault was constructed in 1923, and its first annual meeting was held in 1930.

Municipal administration was characterized by several lengthy terms of service. O. W. Howard served as secretary-treasurer from March 1913 until April 1949, followed by W. A. Bowes, who served from May 1949 until March 1990.

The agricultural importance of local water supplies was documented in a 1936 study by the Geological Survey of Canada. The report, Ground Water Resources of the Rural Municipality of Gull Lake No. 139, Saskatchewan, examined local groundwater resources and was published as Water Supply Paper No. 96, accompanied by a map.

=== Road development and regional cooperation ===
When the rural municipality was established in 1913, its road network consisted largely of prairie trails. Road improvements subsequently took place through municipal works and provincial–municipal infrastructure programs, including Saskatchewan's Grid Road, Main Farm Access, and Super Grid programs.

The RM of Gull Lake later cooperated with the neighbouring RM of Carmichael No. 109 and RM of Webb No. 138 in the establishment of Maintenance Area No. 1, a shared arrangement for municipal road maintenance.

=== Oil and gas development ===
Agriculture and ranching remained important to the local economy during the twentieth century, while the development of petroleum and natural gas resources introduced additional industrial activity. Oil exploration began on a limited scale in the Gull Lake area during the mid-1950s, followed by increased drilling during the mid-1960s.

The discovery of oil and gas resources during the 1950s also contributed to population growth in the surrounding region, particularly in the Town of Gull Lake. Farming, ranching, and petroleum production subsequently became established components of the regional economy.

=== Shared municipal facilities ===
In January 1970, the RM of Gull Lake and the neighbouring RM of Carmichael No. 109 moved into shared municipal office premises in Gull Lake, following discussions involving both municipalities and the Town of Gull Lake.

In November 2006, the RM of Carmichael withdrew from shared ownership of the municipal office property at 1184 Conrad Avenue. The RM of Gull Lake consequently became the sole owner of the property, assuming responsibility for its utilities, maintenance, and repairs.

== Demographics ==
Population history (1981–2016)
Year	Pop.	±%
1981	348	—
1986	338	−2.9%
1991	307	−9.2%
1996	282	−8.1%
2001	251	−11.0%
2006	221	−12.0%
2011	201	−9.0%
2016	201	+0.0%
2021	185	−8.0%
Source: Statistics Canada via Saskatchewan Bureau of Statistics

In the 2021 Census of Population conducted by Statistics Canada, the RM of Gull Lake No. 139 had a population of 185 living in 73 of its 89 total private dwellings, a change of −8% from its 2016 population of 201. With a land area of 828.48 km^{2} (319.88 sq mi), it had a population density of 0.2/km^{2} (0.6/sq mi) in 2021.

In the 2016 Census of Population, the RM of Gull Lake No. 139 recorded a population of 201 living in 81 of its 89 total private dwellings, a 0% change from its 2011 population of 201. With a land area of 836.41 km^{2} (322.94 sq mi), it had a population density of 0.2/km^{2} (0.6/sq mi) in 2016.

== Geography ==
=== Communities and localities ===
The following urban municipalities are surrounded by the RM.

Towns

- Gull Lake

Villages

- Tompkins

== Government ==
The RM of Gull Lake No. 139 is governed by an elected municipal council and an appointed administrator that meets on the second Tuesday of every month. The reeve of the RM is Jason Craig while its administrator is Jeanette Kerr. The RM's office is located in Gull Lake.

== Transportation ==
- Saskatchewan Highway 1
- Saskatchewan Highway 37
- Saskatchewan Highway 631
- Gull Lake Airport

== See also ==
- List of rural municipalities in Saskatchewan
