= Meadow Lake Power Station =

Natural gas power station in Saskatchewan, Canada

- Country: Canada
- Location: Meadow Lake, Saskatchewan
- Coordinates: 54°7′50″N 108°25′21″W
- Status: Operational
- Commission date: 1984
- Owner: SaskPower

Thermal power station
- Primary fuel: Natural gas
- Turbine technology: Gas turbine

Power generation
- Nameplate capacity: 44 MW

Meadow Lake Power Station is a natural gas-fired station owned by SaskPower, located in Meadow Lake, Saskatchewan, Canada and operated as a peaking plant.

== Description ==
The Meadow Lake Station consists of:

- 1 - 44 MW unit, commissioned in 1984

== See also ==
- List of power stations in Canada
- List of generating stations in Saskatchewan
