= Yellowhead Power Station =

Natural gas power station in Saskatchewan, Canada

- Country: Canada
- Location: North Battleford, Saskatchewan
- Coordinates: 52.7233°N 108.2318°W
- Status: Operational
- Commission date: December 2010
- Owner: SaskPower

Thermal power station
- Primary fuel: Natural gas

Power generation
- Units operational: 3
- Nameplate capacity: 138 MW

Yellowhead Power Station is a natural gas-fired power station owned by SaskPower, located in North Battleford, Saskatchewan, Canada and operated as a peaking plant. The plant was constructed and commissioned in December 2010 at a cost of $250 M CDN. The plant is controlled remotely by satellite from Regina.

== Description ==
The Yellowhead Power Station consists of:

- 3 General Electric LM6000 simple cycle gas turbines for a total capacity of 138-megawatt commissioned in 2010.

== See also ==
- List of generating stations in Saskatchewan
