= Turner–Climax Border Crossing =

Border crossing between Canada and the United States

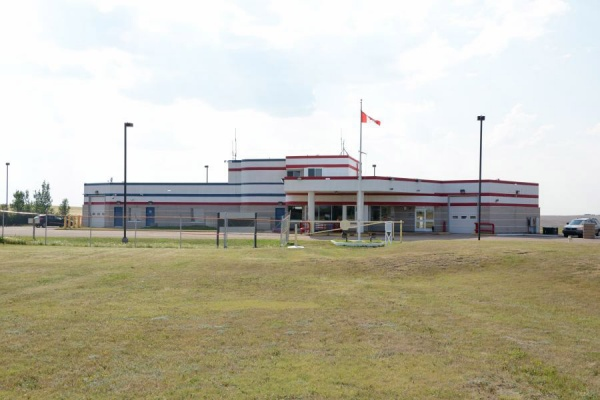
- Joint US-Canada Joint Border Crossing Station

Locaiton
- Country: United States; Canada
- Location: S-241 / Highway 37; US Port: 41725 Turner Road, Turner, MT 59542; Canadian Port: Highway 37, Climax SK S0N 0N0
- Coordinates: 48°59′58″N 108°23′21″W

Details
- Opened: 1927

Website
- US Canadian

The Turner–Climax Border Crossing connects Turner, Montana and Climax, Saskatchewan on the Canada–US border. Montana Secondary Highway 241 (MT 241) on the American side joins Saskatchewan Highway 37 (SK 37) on the Canadian side. Climax lies about 24 km (15 mi) north and Turner 10 mi (16 km) south.

== Canadian side ==
Near to the present customs office were the locations of the former settlement of Treelon, in the Rural Municipality of Lone Tree No. 18, and the place where the Harlem Trail, which led to Harlem, Montana, crossed the boundary. On past occasions, the border crossing was known as Harlem Trail or Treelon. In earlier times, a police officer and customs officer were stationed at the border. In 1914, J. Gillespie was the first regular customs officer. The station closed in 1918.

In 1926, an office was established at Climax. Duncan McIntosh, who had set up the West Poplar River office in 1918, was the first customs officer. In 1935, the office moved to Treelon. Anyone passing through during the night would knock on the bedroom window for attention.

== US side ==
In 1935, Hole Bros. Refinery of Montana installed a bulk fuel station at the border. Although, Canada cooperated by relocating its border station, the US did not, requiring drivers to travel 10 miles south to Turner to complete customs paperwork. After lobbying, the company was permitted to extend a pipeline across the border to resolve the situation. The US did not move the customs offices to the border until some time after 1939.

Efforts to expand the operating hours over the years have been unsuccessful. In 2023 the station was closed to US citizens crossing on Saturday and Sunday.

== Joint facility ==
This facility is one of only six joint US-Canada border stations where U.S. Customs and Border Protection (CBP) and the Canada Border Services Agency (CBSA) share a single facility. The rationale for making this facility a joint border station was primarily for officer safety, since the border stations on both sides of the border were often staffed by only one officer at a time.

Construction on the joint facility was completed in 1992.

The crossing is so remote that border officials live in government housing next to the station.

== See also ==
- List of Canada–United States border crossings
