= Alison Carmichael =

- Born: c. 1792; Edinburgh
- Died: 1885; Bailiwick of Guernsey
- Occupation: Novelist
- Parents: Charles Stuart of Dunearn (father); Mary Erskine (mother)
- Relatives: James Stuart

Alison Charles Carmichael (c. 1792 – 1885) was a Scottish novelist and writer who authored two works about the West Indies.

Alison Charles Stewart was born around 1792 in Edinburgh, Scotland, the daughter of Dr. Charles Stewart of Dunearn, minister and physician, and Mary Erskine Stewart, daughter of the minister and abolitionist John Erskine. Her brother was the politician and author James Stuart of Dunearn. In 1815, she married army Captain John Wilson Carmichael and they had two daughters.

In 1820, the family relocated to Saint Vincent, where her husband owned the Mousebank plantation, where seventy eight people were enslaved. Her husband sold it in 1822 and the family moved to the Laurel Hill plantation in Trinidad. They returned to the UK in 1826.

The next year, she submitted a manuscript of Domestic Manners (1833) to a publisher, though it was not published (by a different publisher) until 1833. It was published under the name "Mrs. Carmichael," though the identification of this as Alison Carmichael did not occur until the 21st century, thanks to an 1833 letter written by Henry David Inglis in the National Library of Scotland. Domestic Manners purports to be a fact-based account as the author writes "I shall not attempt to describe any thing as fact to which I have not been an eye witness." It is in fact a racist pro-slavery tract and a defense of plantation owners - she claims that there were "no class of men on earth more calumniated" than them. These views are in stark contrast to other members of her family, including her brother, who wrote against slavery in Three Years in North America (1833). Her novel Tales of a Grandmother (1841) is a fictionalized account of her childhood life in the West Indies, as told by an unnamed grandmother to her grandchildren. The story is interrupted by sections on the natural history of the West Indies and moral arguments on the value of education.

After her husband's death in 1850, she and her children relocated to Guernsey. Alison Carmichael died in 1885 in Guernsey.

== Bibliography ==
- Domestic Manners and Social Condition of the White, Coloured, and Negro Population of the West Indies. By Mrs. Carmichael, Five years a resident in St. Vincent and Trinidad. 2 vols. London: Whittaker, Treacher, and Co., 1833.
- Tales of a Grandmother. By Mrs. A.C. Carmichael. London: Richard Bentley, 1841.
