= Cory Cogeneration Station =

Natural gas power station in Saskatchewan, Canada

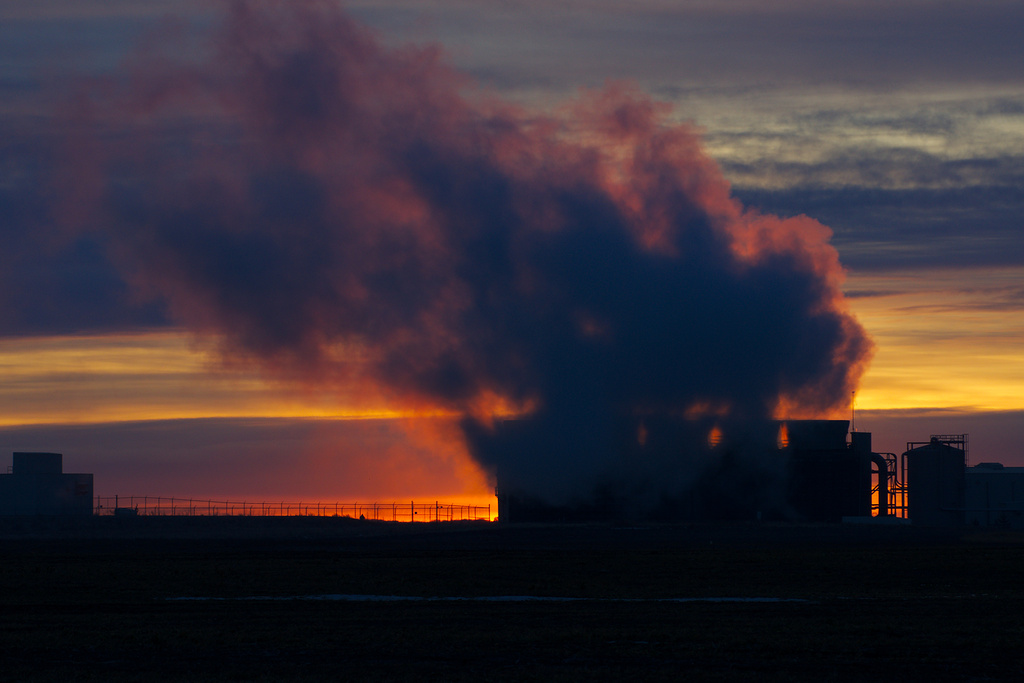
- Country: Canada
- Location: Vanscoy No. 345, near Saskatoon, Saskatchewan
- Coordinates: 52°5′37″N 106°52′3″W
- Status: Operational
- Commission date: 2003
- Owner: SaskPower

Thermal power station
- Primary fuel: Natural gas
- Turbine technology: Gas turbine, steam turbine
- Combined cycle?: Yes
- Cogeneration?: Yes

Power generation
- Nameplate capacity: 228 MW

Cory Cogeneration Station is a natural gas-fired station owned by SaskPower and located near Saskatoon, Saskatchewan, Canada. The plant operates at 260 MW in a conventional generation mode and at 228 MW in a cogeneration mode. Steam from the plant is used to supply the Potash Corp Cory Mine.

The facility was originally developed as a joint venture of SaskPower and ATCO in 2003. SaskPower took full ownership in 2019 when it purchased ATCO's 50% stake.

== Description ==
The Cory Cogeneration Station consists of:

- two GE PG 7121EA Gas Turbines (85 MW)
- two Heat Recovery Steam Generators (140 tonnes per hour) and
- one GE Steam Turbine (90 MW)

== See also ==
- List of generating stations in Saskatchewan
