= Saskatchewan Highway 37 =

Provincial highway in Saskatchewan, Canada

Highway 37
- Highway 37 highlighted in red
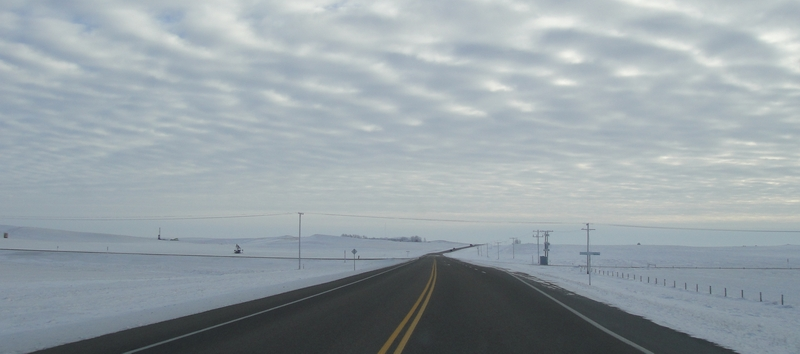
- Highway 37 southbound, north of Shaunavon

Route information
- Maintained by Ministry of Highways and Infrastructure
- Length: 186.2 km (115.7 mi)

Major junctions
- South end: S-241 at the U.S. border at Port of Climax
- Highway 18 at Climax; Highway 13 at Shaunavon; Highway 1 (TCH) at Gull Lake
- North end: Highway 32 at Cabri

Location
- Country: Canada
- Province: Saskatchewan
- Rural municipalities: Lone Tree, Frontier, Grassy Creek, Bone Creek, Carmichael, Gull Lake, Pittville, Riverside

Highway system
- Provincial highways in Saskatchewan
← Highway 36	→ Highway 38

Highway 37 is a provincial highway in the Canadian province of Saskatchewan. It runs from Montana Secondary Highway 241 at the US border near the Port of Climax north to Highway 32 at Cabri. Highway 37 is about 186 kilometres (116 mi) long.

== Route description ==
Highway 37 begins at the Port of Climax border crossing and heads north to Highway 32 at Cabri. It passes through the communities of Climax, Shaunavon, and Gull Lake and connects with Highways 18, 722, 13, 631, 1, 322, and 738. Highway 37 crosses the Frenchman River between Climax and Shaunavon and the Swift Current Creek between Shaunavon and Gull Lake. The access for Antelope Lake Regional Park is from Highway 37 north of Gull Lake and the Trans-Canada Highway.

== Highway upgrades ==
Notable projects on Highway 37 include:

- In 2002, 15.6 km (9.7 mi) of the highway was repaved from 10 km (6.2 mi) south of Shaunavon to just north of the Frenchman River
- In 2004, a stretch of the highway from 3 km (1.9 mi) south of the Frenchman River to 10 km (6.2 mi) north of the river was upgraded and resurfaced
- In 2009, 12.8 km (8.0 mi) of the highway from Climax to the Frenchman River was upgraded to a primary weight highway
- In 2022, 16 km (9.9 mi) of Highway 37 was repaved at Shaunavon — 12 km (7.5 mi) north from the intersection with Highway 13 and 4 km (2.5 mi) south
- In May of 2024, it was announced that 1.3 km (0.81 mi) of Highway 37 through Gull Lake will be resurfaced and upgraded with new curbs and gutters

== Frenchman River landslides ==
Saskatchewan Highways and Transportation (SHT), now the Ministry of Highways and Infrastructure undertook a landslide risk management system program to monitor risk sites, apply technological innovations to prevent any further erosion of the riverbank and plan responses to future landslide movement detected by monitors. Highway 37 south of Shaunavon along the Frenchman River has experienced landslides.

== Major intersections ==
From south to north:

Rural municipality	Location	km	mi	Destinations	Notes
Lone Tree No. 18	Port of Climax	0.0	0.0	S-241 south – Harlem	Continuation into Montana
Lone Tree No. 18	Port of Climax	0.0	0.0	Canada–United States border at Turner–Climax Border Crossing	
Lone Tree No. 18	Climax	23.0	14.3	Highway 18 east – Val Marie	South end of Hwy 18 concurrency
Lone Tree No. 18	Climax	31.9	19.8	Highway 18 west – Frontier	North end of Hwy 18 concurrency
Frontier No. 19	No major junctions				
Grassy Creek No. 78	Shaunavon	74.1	46.0	Highway 722 east	
Grassy Creek No. 78	Shaunavon	74.5	46.3	Highway 13 west (Red Coat Trail) – Eastend	South end of Hwy 13 concurrency
Bone Creek No. 108		83.9	52.1	Highway 13 east (Red Coat Trail) – Cadillac, Assiniboia Highway 724 west	North end of Hwy 13 concurrency
Carmichael No. 109	No major junctions				
Gull Lake No. 139	Gull Lake	126.7	78.7	Highway 631 east	
Gull Lake No. 139	Gull Lake	127.1	79.0	Highway 1 (TCH) – Maple Creek, Medicine Hat, Swift Current	
Gull Lake No. 139 – Webb No. 138 boundary	No major junctions				
↑ / ↓ (Note: Quadripoint of Gull Lake No. 139, Webb No. 138, Pittville No. 169, and Riverside No. 168.)		150.3	93.4	Highway 728 – Nadeauville	
Pittville No. 169 – Riverside No. 168 boundary		160.1	99.5	Highway 332 west – Hazlet	South end of Hwy 332 concurrency
Riverside No. 168		161.7	100.5	Highway 332 east – Swift Current	North end of Hwy 332 concurrency
Riverside No. 168		184.4	114.6	Highway 738 west	South end of Hwy 738 concurrency
Riverside No. 168	Cabri	186.2	115.7	Highway 32 – Leader, Swift Current Highway 738 east – Stewart Valley	North end of Hwy 738 concurrency
1.000 mi = 1.609 km; 1.000 km = 0.621 mi: Concurrency terminus; Route transition

== See also ==
- Transportation in Saskatchewan
- Roads in Saskatchewan
