= Henry David Inglis =

Scottish writer

Henry David Inglis, pseudonym Derwent Conway, (1795–1835) was a Scottish travel writer and journalist.

== Life ==
The only son of a Scottish advocate, Inglis was born in Edinburgh, and was educated for a business career. He spent time travelling abroad. For a short time before 1830 he edited a local newspaper at Chesterfield in Derbyshire, but shortly set off on further foreign travel.

In 1832, Inglis went to the Channel Islands, and edited a Jersey newspaper, The British Critic, for two years. Finally, in London, he contributed to The New Monthly Magazine his last literary work, Rambles in the Footsteps of Don Quixote, with illustrations by George Cruikshank. He died of disease of the brain, at his residence in Bayham Terrace, Regent's Park, on 20 March 1835.

== Works ==
Under the name of Derwent Conway, Inglis published his first work, Tales of the Ardennes (1825), which was well received. There followed in quick succession Narrative of a Journey through Norway, part of Sweden, and the Islands and States of Denmark (1826), Solitary Walks through many Lands (1828), and A Tour through Switzerland and the South of France and the Pyrenees (1830 and 1831). Of his journeys through Spain and the Tyrol in 1830 and following years, he published accounts, Spain in 1830 appearing in 1831, and The Tyrol, with a Glance at Bavaria, in 1833.

An early interest was phrenology: Inglis published a lecture on it in 1826. It was published with the Essay on Craniology of Richard Winter Hamilton.

In 1832, Inglis wrote a novel, in three volumes, entitled The New Gil Blas, or Pedro of Pennaflor, 1832, showing social life in Spain. He published in 1834 a description, in two volumes, of the Channel Islands. The same year he published, after an Irish tour, Ireland in 1834, which was quoted as an authority by speakers in parliament in 1835, and reached a fifth edition in 1838.
