= Carmichael, Saskatchewan =

Carmichael
- Special service area
- Location within Carmichael No. 109 Location within Saskatchewan
- Coordinates: 50.0455°N 108.6482°W
- Country: Canada
- Province: Saskatchewan
- Region: Southwest
- Rural municipality: Carmichael
- Post office founded: September 1, 1911
- Incorporated (village): May 25, 1917
- Dissolved (special service area): December 31, 2018

Government
  - MLA: Doug Steele
  - MP: Jeremy Patzer

Area
  - Total: 0.67 km^{2} (0.26 sq mi)

Population (2016)
  - Total: 53
  - Density: 87.2/km^{2} (226/sq mi)
- Time zone: UTC-6 (CST)
- Postal code: S0N 1A0
- Area code: 306
- Highways: Highway 1
- Railways: Canadian Pacific Railway

Carmichael is a special service area within the Rural Municipality of Carmichael No. 109, Saskatchewan, Canada that held village status prior to 2019. The population was 58 at the 2016 Census. Carmichael lies 1 km (1 mi) south of Highway 1 commonly known as the Trans Canada Highway, approximately 158 km (98 mi) east of city of Medicine Hat, Alberta.

== History ==
Carmichael incorporated as a village on May 25, 1917. It restructured on December 31, 2018, relinquishing its village status in favour of becoming a special service area under the jurisdiction of the Rural Municipality of Carmichael No. 109.

== Demographics ==
Canada census – Carmichael community profile

| | 2016 | 2011 |
| Population | 58 (+93.3% from 2011) | 30 (200% from 2006) |
| Land area | 0.67 km^{2} (0.26 sq mi) | 0.67 km^{2} (0.26 sq mi) |
| Population density | 87.2/km^{2} (226/sq mi) | 45.1/km^{2} (117/sq mi) |
| Median age | 44.7 (M: 47.0, F: 44.5) | N/A (M: N/A, F: N/A) |
| Private dwellings | 23 (total) | 16 (total) |
| Median household income | | $N/A |

References: 2016 2011

== Attractions ==
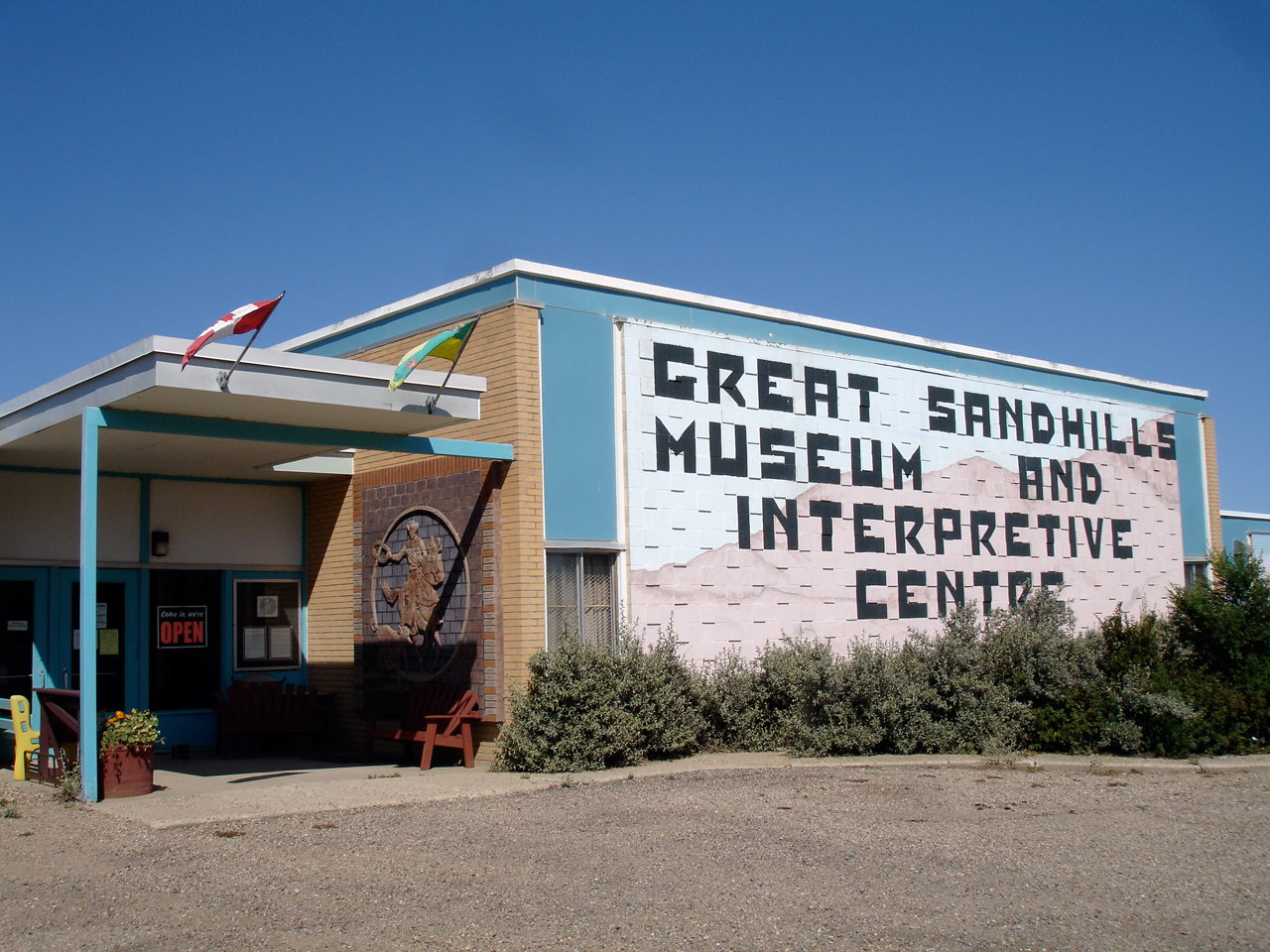
Great Sandhills Museum in Sceptre

- Big Muddy Badlands, a series of badlands in southern Saskatchewan and northern Montana along Big Muddy Creek. They are found in the Big Muddy Valley, a cleft of erosion and sandstone along Big Muddy Creek. The valley is 55 kilometres (34 mi) long, 3.2 kilometres (2.0 mi) wide and 160 metres (520 ft) deep. The valley was formed when it was part of an ancient glacial meltwater channel that carried great quantities of water southeastward during the last ice age.
- Cypress Hills Interprovincial Park, an interprovincial park straddling the southern Alberta – Saskatchewan border, located north-west of Robsart. It is Canada's first and only interprovincial park.
- Cypress Hills Vineyard & Winery, open by appointment only from Christmas until May 14.
- Fort Walsh, is part of the Cypress Hills Interprovincial Park. As a National Historic Site of Canada the area possesses National Historical Significance. It was established as a North-West Mounted Police (NWMP) fort after and at the location of the Cypress Hills Massacre.
- Grasslands National Park, represents the Prairie Grasslands natural region, protecting one of the nation's few remaining areas of undisturbed dry mixed-grass/shortgrass prairie grassland. The park is located in the WWF-defined Northern short grasslands ecoregion, which spans across much of Southern Saskatchewan, Southern Alberta, and the northern Great Plains states in the United States. The unique landscape and harsh, semi-arid climate provide niches for several specially adapted plants and animals. The park and surrounding area house the country's only black-tailed prairie dog colonies. Other rare and endangered fauna that can be found in the park include the pronghorn, sage grouse, burrowing owl, ferruginous hawk, prairie rattlesnake, black-footed ferret and eastern short-horned lizard. Flora includes blue grama grass, needlegrass, Plains Cottonwood and silver sagebrush.
- The Great Sand Hills, is a sand dune rising 50 feet above the ground and covering 1,900 square kilometers. Native prairie grass helps keep the sand together. The sand dunes are fringed by small groves of aspen, birch, and willow trees, and by rose bushes, chokecherry and sagebrush. Subjected to strong winds, the dunes are always moving, creating an ever-changing landscape for photographers.
- Robsart Art Works, opens July 1 to August 28, 2010, from 1 to 4 p.m. and by appointment and features Saskatchewan artists featuring photographers of old buildings and towns throughout Saskatchewan.
- T.rex Discovery Centre, a world class facility to house the fossil record of the Eastend area started many years before the discovery of "Scotty" the T.Rex in 1994.

== Pop culture ==
In the season 6 episode of Corner Gas entitled "Reader Pride," Constable Karen Pelly read a romance novel to Mrs. Carmichael who lived in a seniors home. The last name of the character was taken from the community.

== See also ==
- List of communities in Saskatchewan
- List of special service areas in Saskatchewan
