= Duncan Carmichael (cricketer) =

English cricketer (1915–1984)

Personal information
- Born: 8 November 1915; Jalpaiguri, India
- Died: 28 November 1984 (aged 69); Alton, Hampshire
- Source: Cricinfo, 15 April 2017

Duncan Carmichael (8 November 1915 – 28 November 1984) was an English cricketer. He played nine first-class matches for Cambridge University Cricket Club between 1936 and 1937.

== See also ==
- List of Cambridge University Cricket Club players
