= Landis, Saskatchewan =

Village in Saskatchewan, Canada

Landis
- Village
- Village of Landis
- Location in Saskatchewan Landis (Canada)
- Coordinates: 52°12′N 108°27′W
- Country: Canada
- Province: Saskatchewan
- Region: Central
- Census division: 13
- Rural Municipality: Reford No. 379
- Federal Electoral District: Battlefords—Lloydminster
- Provincial Constituency: Kindersley-Biggar
- Post office Founded: 1907

Government
  - Type: Municipal
  - Governing body: Landis Village Council
  - Mayor: Rob Ford
  - Administrator: Alicia Leclercq
  - MLA: Kim Gartner (SKP)
  - MP: Gerry Ritz

Area
  - Land: 0.80 km^{2} (0.31 sq mi)

Population (2016)
  - Total: 152
  - Density: 189.4/km^{2} (491/sq mi)
- Time zone: UTC−6 (CST)
- Postal code: S0K 2K0
- Area code: 306
- Highways: Highway 14 Highway 656
- Railways: Canadian National Railway
- Website: villageoflandis.com

Landis is a village in the Canadian province of Saskatchewan within the Rural Municipality of Reford No. 379 and Census Division No. 13. The village is about 51 kilometres (32 mi) south of Wilkie and about 128 kilometres (80 mi) west from the city of Saskatoon on Highway 14. From 1907 to 1909, the post office at Section 23, Township 37, Range 18 west of the 3rd meridian, was known as Daneville. In 1925, Landis was a Canadian National Railway Station on the Grand Trunk Pacific Railway line.

As of the 2016 Census, its population was 152.

== History ==
Landis incorporated as a village on May 17, 1909.

== Demographics ==
Population history (1981–2016)
Year	Pop.	±%
1981	277	—
1986	269	−2.9%
1991	228	−15.2%
1996	189	−17.1%
2001	161	−14.8%
2006	119	−26.1%
2011	139	+16.8%
2016	152	+9.4%
Source: Statistics Canada via Saskatchewan Bureau of Statistics

In the 2021 Census of Population conducted by Statistics Canada, Landis had a population of 133 living in 68 of its 78 total private dwellings, a change of −12.5% from its 2016 population of 152. With a land area of 0.84 km^{2} (0.32 sq mi), it had a population density of 158.3/km^{2} (410.1/sq mi) in 2021.

In the 2016 Census of Population, the Village of Landis recorded a population of 152 living in 71 of its 82 total private dwellings, a 8.6% change from its 2011 population of 139. With a land area of 0.8 km^{2} (0.31 sq mi), it had a population density of 190.0/km^{2} (492.1/sq mi) in 2016.

== Education ==
Landis had a K–12 school located within the Sun West School Division. The school was renovated in 1994 and then permanently closed in July 2014.

== Landis Lake ==
About 3 kilometres (1.9 mi) west of the village is Landis Lake, which is a small endorheic salt lake. It is part of the Landis Lake Important Bird Area (IBA) of Canada that covers 63.07 square kilometres (24.35 sq mi) of land. It is a significant habitat for congregating shorebirds and a small section of the west-central shore line is designated as critical piping plover habitat. Other birds found there include the stilt sandpiper, sanderling, red-necked phalarope, pectoral sandpiper, American avocet, and the lesser yellowlegs. Landis Lake depends on spring runoff and seasonal rains to maintain water levels. During dry years, the lake will completely dry up.

== See also ==
- List of communities in Saskatchewan
- List of villages in Saskatchewan
- List of francophone communities in Saskatchewan
- Landis Power Station
