= James Carmichael =

James Carmichael may refer to:

- James Wilson Carmichael (1800–1868), British marine painter, also often referred to as John Wilson Carmichael
- James William Carmichael (1819–1903), Member of the Canadian House of Commons
- James Carmichael (bishop) (1838–1908), Anglican Bishop of Montreal, 1906–1908
- Sir James Carmichael, 3rd Baronet (1844–1902), Scottish MP for Glasgow St Rollox
- Sir James Carmichael (engineer) (1868–1934), British Army officer, engineer and Crown Agent
- James Carmichael (British politician) (1894–1966), Scottish Labour Member of Parliament
- Jim Carmichael (1939–2016), Ohio State Representative
- James Anthony Carmichael (born 1941), American music arranger and record producer
- James V. Carmichael (1910–1972), American lawyer, businessman, and member of the Georgia General Assembly
- James Henry Carmichael Jr. (1907–1983), American airmail pilot, airline executive
- James Carmichael (minister), Church of Scotland minister and author
- Jimmy Carmichael (footballer) (1894–1967), Scottish footballer

== See also ==
- Sir James Carmichael-Smyth, 1st Baronet (1779–1838), Governor of the Bahamas and British Guiana
