= Peter Carmichael =

Peter Carmichael may refer to:

- Peter Carmichael (Royal Navy officer) (1923–1997), Royal Navy pilot
- Pete Carmichael (1941–2016), American football coach
- Peter S. Carmichael (1966–2024), American historian
- Pete Carmichael Jr. (born 1971), American football coach
