= Otto Carmichael House =

Historic house in Indiana, United States

- U.S. National Register of Historic Places
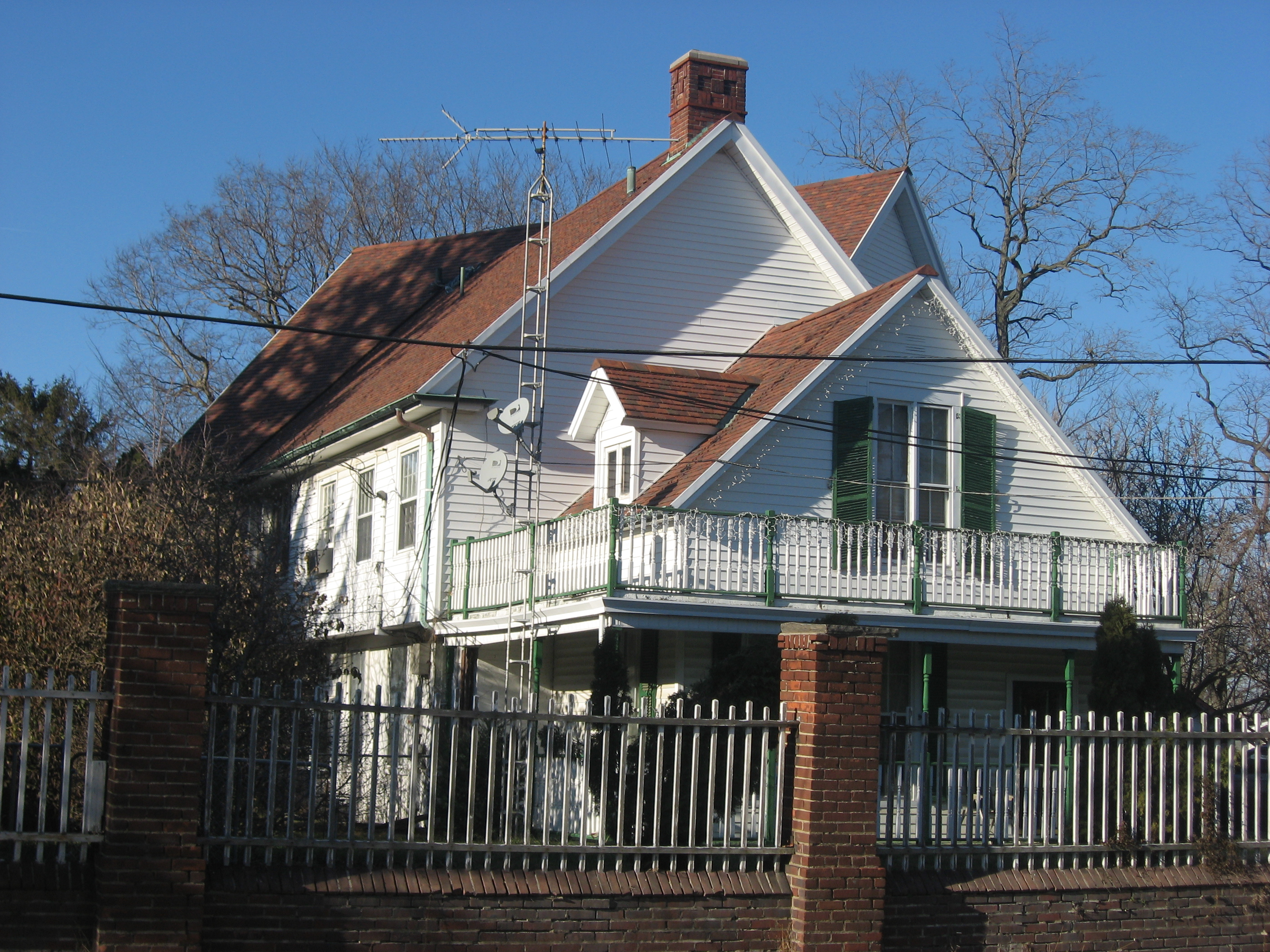
- Otto Carmichael House, January 2012

- Location within Indiana Location within the United States
- Location: 900 W. Kilgore Ave., Muncie, Indiana
- Coordinates: 40°11′28″N 85°23′51″W
- Area: 1.3 acres (0.53 ha)
- Built: 1875
- Architectural style: Colonial Revival, Tudor Revival
- NRHP reference No.: 99001596
- Added to NRHP: January 6, 2000

Otto Carmichael House, also known as the Mary Louise Farm, is a historic home located at Muncie, Indiana. The original section was built in 1875, and later enlarged and remodeled in 1929. It is a rambling 2 1/2-story, brick and frame dwelling Colonial Revival and Tudor Revival design elements. It features steeply pitched gable roofs. It was part of the Carmichael family's "Mary Louise Farm" complex, which included barns for livestock, a log cabin, and flower gardens. The rest of the area was redeveloped into a shopping plaza, with the house remaining as the last vestige of the complex today.

The home is named for prominent journalist, conservationist, and civic leader Otto Carmichael. Born near Muncie in 1865, Carmichael worked for various local papers (including the Muncie Morning Star). Otto Carmichael (in collaboration with his brother, Milton) gained rose to prominence in the realm of journalism by selling stories on the Johnstown Flood and the death of Jefferson Davis to various national papers. In 1890, Carmichael was hired by the Detroit Journal as a Congressional correspondent. He served as a Washington correspondent for various national papers, including the Boston Herald, the New York World, the Louisville Times, the Cincinnati Commercial Tribune, the Minneapolis Times, and the Indianapolis Journal. He was also a founding member of the National Press Club. In 1904, he joined a group of investors in purchasing the Detroit Free Press. The group's sale of the paper in 1909 earned Carmichael a significant sum of money. Carmichael invested these funds into various conservation projects in Muncie and also helped to finance the construction of Muncie's initial sewer system. Carmichael's secretary, Marcella Hayes, inherited the house in 1942. In 1942, Margaret Nickols purchased the home and used it as a residential club for seniors.

It was added to the National Register of Historic Places in 2000.
