= Alliance Pipeline =

North American gas pipeline

- www.alliancepipeline.com

Location
- Country: Canada, United States
- Start: northeastern British Columbia and northwestern Alberta
- Passes through: Saskatchewan, North Dakota, Minnesota, Iowa
- To: terminating in Illinois

General information
- Type: Natural Gas
- Owner: Alliance Canada: Pembina Pipeline Corporation (100%); Alliance US: Pembina Pipeline Corporation (100%)
- Operator: Alliance Pipeline Limited Partnership ("Alliance Canada"); Alliance Pipeline L.P. ("Alliance USA")
- Construction started: 1997
- Commissioned: 2000

Technical information
- Length: 3,848 km (2,391 mi)
- Maximum discharge: 1.6 billion cu ft/d (45 million m^{3}/d)
- Diameter: 36 in (914 mm)
- No. of compressor stations: 14 Mainline; 7 Lateral

Alliance Pipeline is a natural gas pipeline from Canada to the United States. It connects north-western Alberta and north-eastern British Columbia in western Canada to Illinois in the American Midwest, passing through Saskatchewan, North Dakota, Minnesota and Iowa. It is owned by Pembina Pipeline. Its FERC code is 176.
