= SunBridge Wind Farm =

Canadian wind farm

Coordinates: 50.0674°N 108.4181°W

The SunBridge Wind Farm is a facility situated five kilometres southeast of Gull Lake, Saskatchewan. The facility is owned by Suncor Energy and Enbridge. The wind farm consists of 17 Vestas V47 wind turbines, for a total capacity of 11.2 MW. The project, completed in 2002, was the first modern wind farm in Saskatchewan. It was decommissioned in August, 2022.

== See also ==
- List of wind farms in Canada
