= Rural Municipality of Carmichael No. 109 =

Rural municipality in Saskatchewan, Canada

Carmichael No. 109
- Rural municipality
- Rural Municipality of Carmichael No. 109

- Location of the RM of Carmichael No. 109 in Saskatchewan
- Coordinates: 49.937°N 108.654°W
- Country: Canada
- Province: Saskatchewan
- Census division: 4
- SARM division: 3
- Federal riding: Cypress Hills—Grasslands
- Provincial riding: Cypress Hills
- Formed: December 9, 1912

Government
  - Reeve: Jim Bradley
  - Governing body: RM of Carmichael No. 109 Council
  - Administrator: Natasha Brown
  - Office location: Gull Lake

Area (2016)
  - Land: 846.4 km^{2} (326.8 sq mi)

Population (2016)
  - Total: 444
  - Density: 0.5/km^{2} (1.3/sq mi)
- Time zone: CST
  - Summer (DST): CST
- Postal code: S0N 1A0
- Area codes: 306 and 639

The Rural Municipality of Carmichael No. 109 (2016 population: 444) is a rural municipality (RM) in the Canadian province of Saskatchewan within Census Division No. 4 and SARM Division No. 3.

== History ==
The RM of Carmichael No. 109 incorporated as a rural municipality on December 9, 1912.

== Geography ==
=== Communities and localities ===
The following urban municipalities are surrounded by the RM.

Villages

- Carmichael

The following unincorporated communities are within the RM.

Localities

- Garden Head
- Stone

== Demographics ==
Population history (1981–2016)
Year	Pop.	±%
1981	526	—
1986	574	+9.1%
1991	558	−2.8%
1996	462	−17.2%
2001	484	+4.8%
2006	450	−7.0%
2011	440	−2.2%
2016	444	+0.9%
Source: Statistics Canada via Saskatchewan Bureau of Statistics

In the 2021 Census of Population conducted by Statistics Canada, the RM of Carmichael No. 109 had a population of 462 living in 87 of its 102 total private dwellings, a change of −8% from its 2016 population of 502. With a land area of 839.45 km^{2} (324.11 sq mi), it had a population density of 0.6/km^{2} (1.4/sq mi) in 2021.

In the 2016 Census of Population, the RM of Carmichael No. 109 recorded a population of 444 living in 82 of its 110 total private dwellings, a 0.9% change from its 2011 population of 440. With a land area of 846.4 km^{2} (326.8 sq mi), it had a population density of 0.5/km^{2} (1.4/sq mi) in 2016.

== Government ==
The RM of Carmichael No. 109 is governed by an elected municipal council and an appointed administrator that meets on the second Wednesday of every month. The reeve of the RM is Jim Bradley while its administrator is Natasha Brown. The RM's office is located in Gull Lake.

== Transportation ==
- Highway 1 (TCH)—serves Carmichael
- Highway 37
- Highway 633

== See also ==
- List of rural municipalities in Saskatchewan
