= Gull Lake, Saskatchewan =

Town in Saskatchewan, Canada

Gull Lake
- Town
- Town of Gull Lake
- Aerial view, 2026

- Location within Saskatchewan Location within Gull Lake No. 139
- Coordinates: 50°05′49″N 108°29′05″W
- Country: Canada
- Province: Saskatchewan
- Census division: 8
- Rural Municipality: Gull Lake No. 139
- Federal electoral district: Swift Current—Grasslands—Kindersley
- Provincial electoral district: Cypress Hills
- Post office founded: 1 April 1889
- Incorporated (village): 1909
- Incorporated (town): 1911

Government
  - Mayor: Nasser Zanidean
  - Administrator: Emella Waiser
  - Governing body: Gull Lake Town Council
  - MP: Jeremy Patzer (Conservative)
  - MLA: Doug Steele (Saskatchewan)

Area (2021)
  - Total: 2.50 km^{2} (0.97 sq mi)

Population (2021)
  - Total: 908
  - Density: 378.5/km^{2} (980/sq mi)
- Time zone: UTC−06:00 (CST)
- Postal code: S0N 1A0
- Area code: 306
- Highways: Highway 1 (TCH) / Highway 37 / Highway 631
- Website: Official website

Gull Lake is a town in southwestern Saskatchewan, Canada, located at the junction of the Trans-Canada Highway and Highway 37, approximately 56 kilometres (35 miles) southwest of Swift Current. Established on land formerly belonging to the historic 76 Ranch, the community was incorporated as a village in 1909 and as a town in 1911.

Agriculture, ranching, and oil and gas development have historically been important to the local economy. Gull Lake also played an early role in Saskatchewan's wind power industry, with SunBridge Wind Farm, the province's first major wind farm, opening 5 km (3.1 mi) southeast in 2002, followed by the Cypress Wind Power Facility operated by SaskPower opening later that year. The town is also home to the historic Lyceum Theatre, a community-owned cinema with origins dating to 1911.

Gull Lake had a population of 908 in the 2021 Canadian census.

== History ==
=== Name and early settlement ===
The origins of Gull Lake predate the establishment of the present town. The community's name is believed to have originated from the interpretation of an Indigenous Canadian name for a nearby lake frequented by gulls. Naturalist John Macoun has been associated with the name, which was reportedly adopted by Canadian Pacific Railway surveyors in 1883.

The townsite occupies land formerly associated with the 76 Ranch, established in 1887. The ranch was part of an extensive agricultural and ranching enterprise operated by Sir John Lister-Kaye's Canadian Agricultural, Coal and Colonization Company. The Gull Lake ranch comprised approximately 4,000 hectares (10,000 acres), and its ranch house, constructed in 1888, is among the oldest surviving buildings in southwestern Saskatchewan.

Contemporary newspaper reports documented the development of the area's agricultural operations. In July 1889, a correspondent reported visiting Sir John Lister-Kaye's farm at Gull Lake, which was managed by a man named McArthur. In April 1890, a prairie fire severely damaged a flock of approximately 2,200 sheep belonging to the Canadian Agricultural Company near the railway. Newspaper accounts described an inspection involving representatives of the company and the railway following the fire.

=== Townsite development and incorporation ===
By the early 20th century, financial difficulties in the ranching industry and increasing demand for agricultural land contributed to the subdivision and sale of former grazing properties. In 1905, the Gull Lake portion of the 76 Ranch was sold to American land developers Conrad and Price, who surveyed the townsite and offered lots for sale.

Settlement accelerated during 1906. A 20 June, report in The Leader-Post described an influx of settlers and homestead applicants, stores and a hotel under construction, and a second townsite survey underway after the initial lots had been taken up. The Gull Lake Land and Townsite Company was also operating a lumber yard and promoting agricultural property near the railway.

Gull Lake was incorporated as a village in 1909. According to local historical accounts, the first recorded village council meeting took place on 8 February 1909, in the business office of J. Hutchinson. The first council consisted of Hutchinson, Ed Busse, and Arthur H. Thomas, with Hutchinson selected as the village's first overseer.

The community continued to expand, attaining town status in 1911 with a population exceeding 600. By 1912, Gull Lake had established a school, numerous businesses and services, medical facilities, and a local newspaper, The Gull Lake Advance, which had begun publication in 1909.

=== Early municipal development ===
During the years following incorporation, the town council undertook improvements to local infrastructure and public facilities. Early municipal priorities included roads, sidewalks, fire protection, public buildings, and the development of a reliable water supply.

In 1914, after previously meeting in the back room of the fire hall, the town arranged to rent office accommodation in the Clarendon Hotel for $12 per month on a one-year lease. That year, council also considered engineering proposals for waterworks and authorized borrowing for street grading, boulevards, and sidewalk construction.

The community also developed cultural and recreational facilities. In 1911, local businessman Fred J. Schoonmaker began construction of an opera house, which became the Lyceum Theatre. The theatre was used for films, live performances, and community gatherings.

=== Fires and rebuilding ===
Fires affected several of Gull Lake's early commercial buildings. On 20 December 1915, a major fire broke out above the Morrow Furniture Store on Conrad Avenue. Driven by strong winds, it spread to neighbouring premises, destroying the furniture store, a barbershop, a hardware store, and the Lyceum Theatre. The post office was saved, and contemporary reports stated that the theatre's proprietor intended to rebuild in brick.

The Lyceum Theatre was rebuilt in 1916 under Samuel R. Tyler and continued to operate as a cinema and community entertainment venue.

=== Twentieth-century development ===
Following the settlement and construction boom of the early 1900s, Gull Lake's growth stabilized. By the early 1950s, its population was slightly above 700. The discovery and development of petroleum and natural gas resources in southwestern Saskatchewan during the 1950s contributed to renewed growth, with the town's population rising above 1,000. Agriculture, ranching, and the petroleum industry became important components of the local economy.

On 8 March 1976, another fire destroyed the Lyceum Theatre. The community subsequently established the Gull Lake and District Cultural Co-operative to develop a replacement cinema and cultural facility. The new Lyceum Theatre officially opened on 30 March 1978, incorporating a community-operated cinema and public library.

=== Twenty-first century ===
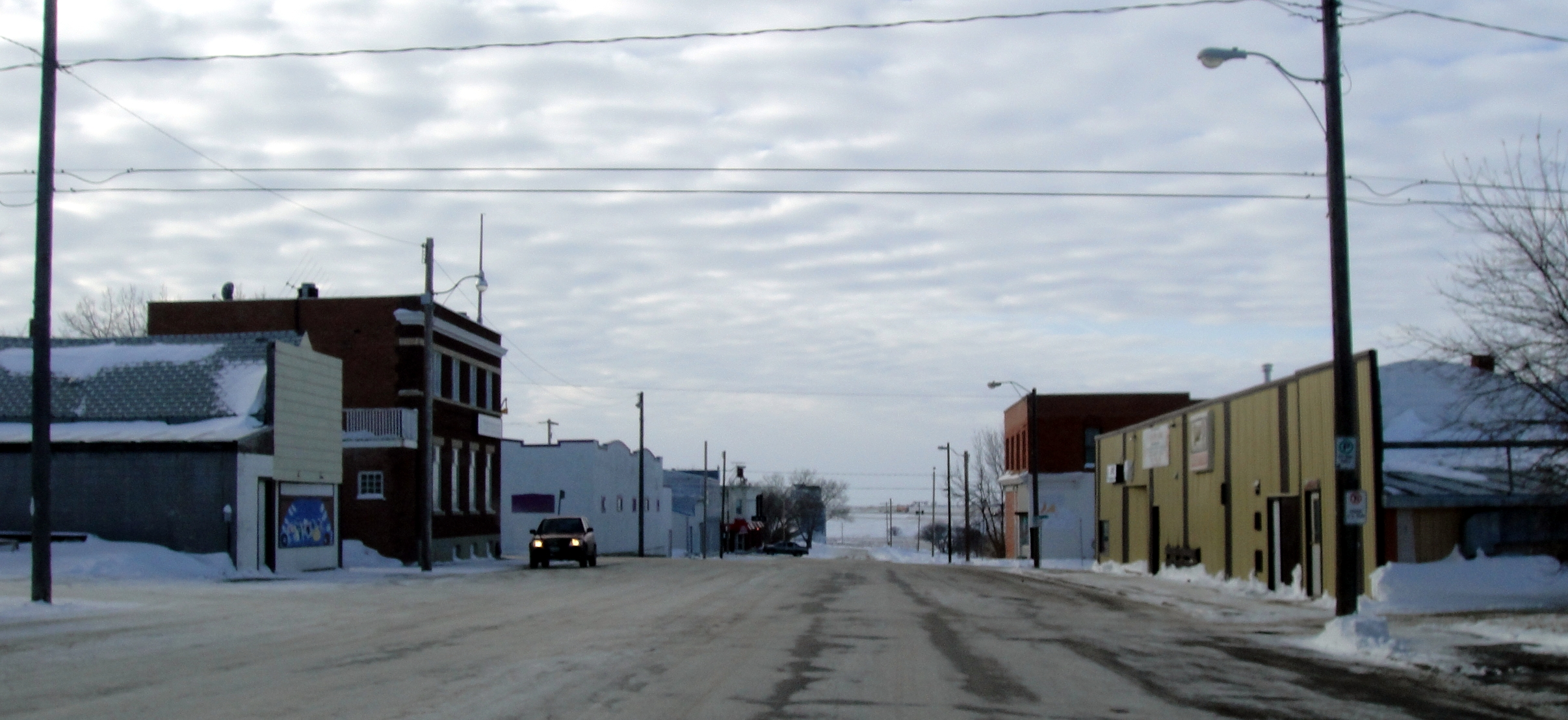
Main street in Gull Lake

On 9 October 2016, a major fire destroyed the historic Clarendon Hotel, a downtown landmark dating from the early twentieth century. Fire crews from Gull Lake and neighbouring communities responded, but the building was largely destroyed. The fire marked the loss of one of the town's oldest commercial buildings.

== Demographics ==
In the 2021 Canadian census conducted by Statistics Canada, Gull Lake had a population of 908 living in 407 of its 494 total private dwellings, a change of −13.2% from its 2016 population of 1,046. With a land area of 2.4 square kilometres (0.93 square miles), it had a population density of 378.3/km^{2} (979.9/sq mi) in 2021.

Canada census – Gull Lake community profile

	2021	2016	2011
Population	908 (-13.2% from 2016)	1,046 (5.8% from 2011)	989 (+2.5% from 2006)
Land area	2.40 km^{2} (0.93 sq mi)	2.50 km^{2} (0.97 sq mi)	2.50 km^{2} (0.97 sq mi)
Population density	378.5/km^{2} (980/sq mi)	418.3/km^{2} (1,083/sq mi)	395.6/km^{2} (1,025/sq mi)
Median age	43.2 (M: 42.0, F: 44.0)	42.9 (M: 41.6, F: 46.6)	48.3 (M: 46.8, F: 49.6)
Private dwellings	494 (total) 407 (occupied)	489 (total) 455 (occupied)	475 (total)
Median household income	$73,000	$65,152

References: 2021 2016 2011

== Climate ==
Gull Lake Experiences a Humid Continental climate (Dfb) with warm summers and long, cold winters.

Climate data for Gull Lake (Gull Lake CDA EPF) Climate ID: 4023060; coordinates 49°57′N 108°28′W; elevation: 906.8 m (2,975 ft); 1971–2000 normals
Month	Jan	Feb	Mar	Apr	May	Jun	Jul	Aug	Sep	Oct	Nov	Dec	Year
Record high °C (°F)	14.0 (57.2)	15.0 (59.0)	20.6 (69.1)	30.0 (86.0)	38.0 (100.4)	39.0 (102.2)	37.0 (98.6)	40.0 (104.0)	37.8 (100.0)	29.0 (84.2)	21.5 (70.7)	14.4 (57.9)	40.0 (104.0)
Mean daily maximum °C (°F)	−6.1 (21.0)	−3.4 (25.9)	2.6 (36.7)	11.4 (52.5)	17.8 (64.0)	22.4 (72.3)	25.4 (77.7)	25.0 (77.0)	18.2 (64.8)	11.8 (53.2)	1.5 (34.7)	−4.7 (23.5)	10.2 (50.4)
Daily mean °C (°F)	−11.5 (11.3)	−8.6 (16.5)	−2.9 (26.8)	4.6 (40.3)	10.6 (51.1)	15.1 (59.2)	17.6 (63.7)	17.0 (62.6)	10.8 (51.4)	4.9 (40.8)	−4.0 (24.8)	−10.1 (13.8)	3.6 (38.5)
Mean daily minimum °C (°F)	−16.8 (1.8)	−13.8 (7.2)	−8.5 (16.7)	−2.2 (28.0)	3.5 (38.3)	7.8 (46.0)	9.8 (49.6)	8.9 (48.0)	3.4 (38.1)	−1.9 (28.6)	−9.4 (15.1)	−15.4 (4.3)	−2.9 (26.8)
Record low °C (°F)	−40.6 (−41.1)	−42.8 (−45.0)	−36.1 (−33.0)	−26.1 (−15.0)	−9.0 (15.8)	−5.6 (21.9)	0.0 (32.0)	−1.5 (29.3)	−10.6 (12.9)	−25.5 (−13.9)	−33.5 (−28.3)	−41.5 (−42.7)	−42.8 (−45.0)
Average precipitation mm (inches)	18.1 (0.71)	13.7 (0.54)	22.3 (0.88)	26.5 (1.04)	64.9 (2.56)	64.6 (2.54)	52.9 (2.08)	41.3 (1.63)	35.9 (1.41)	15.7 (0.62)	12.4 (0.49)	19.6 (0.77)	387.9 (15.27)
Average rainfall mm (inches)	0.0 (0.0)	0.0 (0.0)	1.3 (0.05)	15.3 (0.60)	57.3 (2.26)	64.6 (2.54)	52.9 (2.08)	41.3 (1.63)	32.4 (1.28)	8.5 (0.33)	0.4 (0.02)	0.4 (0.02)	274.2 (10.80)
Average snowfall cm (inches)	18.1 (7.1)	13.7 (5.4)	21.0 (8.3)	11.2 (4.4)	7.7 (3.0)	0.0 (0.0)	0.0 (0.0)	0.0 (0.0)	3.6 (1.4)	7.2 (2.8)	12.0 (4.7)	19.2 (7.6)	113.6 (44.7)
Average precipitation days (≥ 0.2 mm)	5.9	5.3	5.2	6.2	11.6	12.0	10.6	8.7	9.3	4.7	4.4	6.6	90.4
Average rainy days (≥ 0.2 mm)	0.0	0.0	0.4	3.8	11.2	12.0	10.6	8.7	8.9	3.0	0.3	0.1	58.9
Average snowy days (≥ 0.2 cm)	5.9	5.3	4.9	2.8	0.8	0.0	0.0	0.0	0.7	1.9	4.2	6.6	32.9
Source: Environment and Climate Change Canada

== Economy ==
Agriculture is the top employment field with many surrounding farms and ranches, with some work in the oil fields as well.

=== Wind energy ===
The Gull Lake area played an early role in the development of wind power in Canada. Wind resource assessments during the 1990s identified the region as one of Saskatchewan's windiest areas, leading to the development of two wind power facilities near the town.

The SunBridge Wind Farm, located approximately 5 km (3.1 mi) southeast of Gull Lake, was Saskatchewan's first major wind power project. Developed through a partnership between Enbridge and Suncor Energy, the $22 million facility officially opened on 27 June 2002. It consisted of 17 wind turbines with a combined generating capacity of approximately 11 megawatts.

Later that year, SaskPower commissioned the Cypress Wind Power Facility approximately 12 km (7.5 mi) southwest of Gull Lake. The facility initially consisted of nine turbines with a generating capacity of approximately 6 megawatts. Seven additional turbines were installed during a subsequent expansion, increasing its total generating capacity to 11 megawatts by 2004.

== Photography ==
In August 1974, American photographer Stephen Shore photographed streets in Gull Lake during his travels across North America. Two of his colour photographs, Main Street, Gull Lake, Saskatchewan and Proton Avenue, Gull Lake, Saskatchewan, are held in the collection of the Metropolitan Museum of Art in New York City. Both photographs were acquired by the museum in 1975.

Shore's photograph of Main Street was later examined in a 2025 academic study published in the Journal of Visual Literacy, which compared historical landscape photography with AI-generated reinterpretations of photographed locations.

== Notable people ==
- Roger Aldag, former professional Canadian football player who spent 17 seasons with the Saskatchewan Roughriders, winning the Grey Cup in 1989. Born and raised in Gull Lake, he played high school football with the Gull Lake Lions, helping the team win the 1969 provincial nine-man championship. He was inducted into the Canadian Football Hall of Fame in 2002.
- Arthur Slade, award-winning Canadian author of children's and young adult fiction, including Dust and The Hunchback Assignments. He completed high school in Gull Lake before attending the University of Saskatchewan.

== See also ==
- List of communities in Saskatchewan
