= John Carmichael =

John Carmichael may refer to:

- John Carmichael (VC) (1893–1977), Scottish recipient of the Victoria Cross
- John Carmichael (Scientology) (born 1947), president of the Church of Scientology of New York
- John Carmichael (Canadian politician) (born 1952), Canadian politician
- John Carmichael (Kansas politician) (born 1957), American politician from Kansas
- John Carmichael, 1st Earl of Hyndford (1638–1710), Scottish nobleman and politician
- John Carmichael, 3rd Earl of Hyndford (1701–1767), Scottish nobleman and politician
- Sir John Carmichael (died 1600), Scottish official
- Sir John Carmichael-Anstruther, 5th Baronet (1785–1818), known as John Anstruther until 1817, MP for Anstruther Easter Burghs 1811–1818
- Sir John Carmichael-Anstruther, 6th Baronet (1818–1831), shot dead at Eton College
- John Carmichael (composer) (born 1930), Australian composer and pianist
- John Carmichael (cricketer) (1858–1914), English cricketer
- John Carmichael (sportswriter) (1902–1986), American baseball writer
- John Philip Carmichael (1947–2019), Swazi businessman and politician
- John Wilson Carmichael (1799–1868), British marine painter
