= Clan Carmichael =

Scottish clan

- Crest: A dexter hand and arm in pale armed and holding a broken spear Proper
- Motto: Tout Jour Prest (Toujours Prêt, "Always Ready")

Profile
- Region: Lowlands
- District: South Lanarkshire

Chief
- Richard Carmichael of Carmichael
- 26th Baron of Carmichael, 30th Chief of the Name and Arms of Carmichael
- Seat: Carmichael
Allied clans
Clan Douglas

Clan Carmichael is a Scottish clan and is also considered a sept of the Clan Douglas, Clan MacDougall, Stewart of Appin, and Stewart of Galloway.

== History ==
=== Origins of the clan ===
There is only one source of the name Carmichael and that is territorial or geographic in origin from the northern edge of the Southern Uplands in Scotland. An ancient hill fort or caer in a prominent location close to the main route north from the border was chosen by the good Queen Margaret in the year 1058 as the site of one of her first six churches established in the see of Glasgow. Due to the prominence of the site, she dedicated the church to St. Michel and the district and its peoples became of Caermichel when surnames were necessitated in the thirteenth century.

The Carmichaels have been settled in the upper ward of the same name in Lanarkshire for over nine hundred years and it is from this place that they take their name. The lands of Carmichael were originally part of the Dougsdale territory that was granted to the Clan Douglas in 1321 by Robert the Bruce.

In 1220 Robert de Carmitely resigned his claims to the patronage of the church of Cleghorn. In 1226 Robert de Carmichael is mentioned in a charter of Dryburgh Abbey.

Other Carmichaels are later mentioned in the charters of the Douglas family until, between 1374 and 1384 when Sir John de Carmichael received a charter for the lands of Carmichael from William Douglas, 1st Earl of Douglas. Sir John was amongst the knights who supported the Douglases in their struggle for power in Scotland and in their raids across the English border. The grant of this large piece of Douglas land was undoubtedly a reward for the prowess of Sir John and the Carmichael men.

In 1414 the barony of Carmichael was confirmed to the chief of the clan and it extended to over fourteen thousand acres in the parishes of Carmichael, Pettinain and Carluke.

=== 15th to 16th centuries ===
Sir John de Carmichael of Meadowflat (later of Carmichael) fought in France with the Scottish army that was sent to aid the French against an English invasion during the Hundred Years War. In 1421, during the Battle of Baugé, he rode in combat against the English commander, Thomas, Duke of Clarence, a Knight of the Garter and brother of King Henry V of England, unhorsed him and broke his own spear in the action. Carmichael's victory demoralized the English to the extent that they fled the field; to commemorate this, the Carmichaels bear a broken spear on their clan crest.

Catherine Carmichael, daughter of Sir John, who was captain of Crawford Castle, became the mistress of James V of Scotland and bore him a son, who was half-brother to Mary, Queen of Scots. The king built the castle of Crawfordjohn for them to meet undisturbed.

In 1546, Peter Carmichael of Balmedie participated in the killing of Cardinal Beaton in his own seat at St Andrews Castle. Carmichael was sent to the galleys, where he shared penance with the Protestant reformer and clergyman John Knox. Carmichael was imprisoned but later escaped.

Sir John Carmichael was known as "the most expert borderer". He was chief of Clan Carmichael from 1585 to 1599, when he was murdered. He had been a favourite of James VI of Scotland, was knighted at the coronation of the king's queen, Anne, and was later sent on a diplomatic mission to England. Sir John was also Captain of the King's Guard, Master of the Stables, warden of the west marches and a Privy Councillor. He died when he was ambushed after arresting some Armstrongs during a disturbance. However Sir John's brother, Carmichael of Edrom, prosecuted the murderer and obtained justice.

=== 17th to 18th centuries ===
In 1627 Sir James Carmichael was created a Baronet of Nova Scotia and was later raised to the peerage in 1647. During the Wars of the Three Kingdoms, James Carmichael, the first Lord Carmichael was a staunch supporter of Charles I of England although two of his sons took the side of Parliament. The first Lord's son, Sir Daniel Carmichael, commanded the Clydesdale Regiment at the Battle of Marston Moor in 1644 and also at the Battle of Philiphaugh in 1645. The other brothers, Sir James Carmichael of Bonnytoun and Captain John Carmichael, were royalists and the former fought at the Battle of Dunbar (1650) while the latter was killed at Marston Moor where he must have opposed his brothers.

In 1647 Sir James Carmichael became Lord Carmichael and his son became Earl of Hyndford in 1701. The third Earl was a staunch supporter of the Hanoverians and was an ambassador in the service of George II of Great Britain.

=== Modern history ===
The principal family became allied to the Clan Anstruther by the marriage of Lady Margaret, daughter of the 2nd Earl, to Sir John Anstruther whose descendants inherited the Carmichael lands on the death of the 6th Earl of Hyndford in 1817. This family then took the name Carmichael – Anstruther which they continued until the succession of the present chief who resumed the family name in 1980. Chief Richard Carmichael worked tirelessly to support the Clan Carmichael Society which has branches world-wide.

== Clan chief ==
Chief Richard Carmichael died on 30 June 2025. His nephew Owen Carmichael Gordon, has assumed the Title and responsibilities of Chief of Clan Carmichael. He became the 18th, French born chief since the creation of the clan.

== Clan Castles ==
- Maudslie castle
- Eastend House
- Carmichael house
- Crawford Castle
- Castle Craig Hospital
- Fenton Tower

== Cadet Families ==
Cadet families included those of Meadowflat in Lanarkshire and Balmedie in Fife. Many Carmichaels in Galloway became MacMichaels, and in Argyll some MacMichaels became 'Carmichaels', and it is this latter race only who are allied with the Appin Stewarts.

== Clan Tartan ==
from the Clan Carmichael Website.

== See also ==
- Scottish clan
- Earl of Hyndford
