= Gene Carmichael =

American politician and businessman

Albert Eugene "Gene" Carmichael Jr. (1927 - February 21, 2014) was an American politician and businessman.

Born in Lake View, South Carolina, Carmichael served in the United States Army in Europe during World War II. He graduated from The Citadel, The Military College of South Carolina. Carmichael was in several businesses including fertilizer, textiles, gas station, and restaurant. He served in the South Carolina Senate as a Democrat. Carmichael was sentenced in 1982 to ten years in prison for conspiracy to buy votes, obstruction of justice, and vote buying.
