= Carmichael, South Lanarkshire =

Village in South Lanarkshire, Scotland

Coordinates: 55.621°N 3.723°W

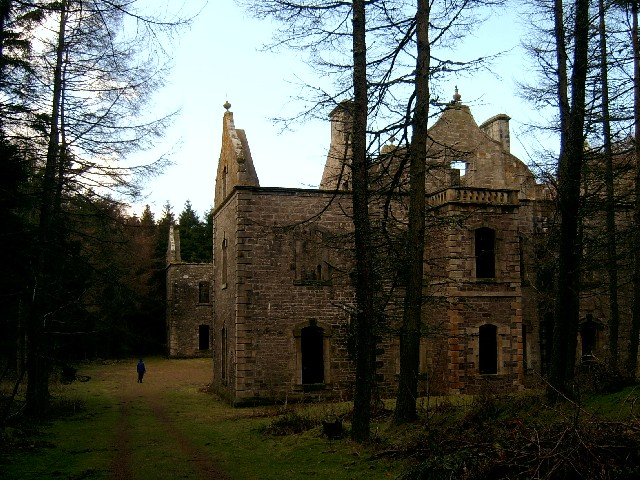
Carmichael House

Carmichael Clan farmhouse kitchen

Carmichael is a small village and civil parish between Biggar and Lanark in South Lanarkshire, Scotland. It is home to the Discover Carmichael Centre, with wax models depicting the history of the Carmichael family and of Scotland more widely. The farm shop and restaurant offer a variety of meats from the estate.
