= SaskPower =

Electrical utility in Canada

Saskatchewan Power Corporation
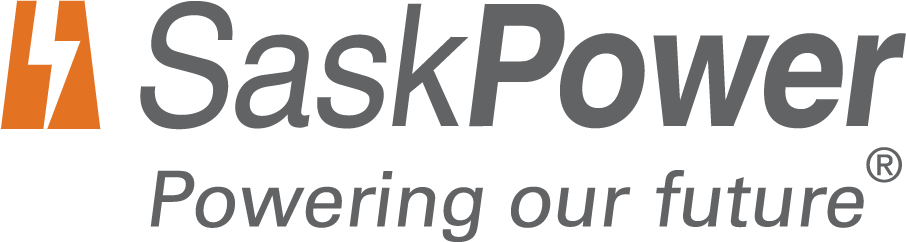
- Trade name: SaskPower
- Formerly: Saskatchewan Power Commission
- Company type: Crown Corporation
- Industry: Electric utility
- Founded: 1929; 97 years ago
- Headquarters: Regina, Saskatchewan, Canada
- Area served: Saskatchewan
- Key people: Rupen Pandya, CEO
- Products: Electricity generation, transmission and distribution
- Revenue: C$2,844 million (2022-23)
- Net income: C$72 million (2022-23)
- Total assets: C$12,878 million (2022-23)
- Total equity: C$2,180 million (2022-23)
- Number of employees: 3,276 (2024-25)
- Parent: Crown Investments Corporation
- Subsidiaries: NorthPoint Energy Solutions; SaskPower International
- Website: www.saskpower.com

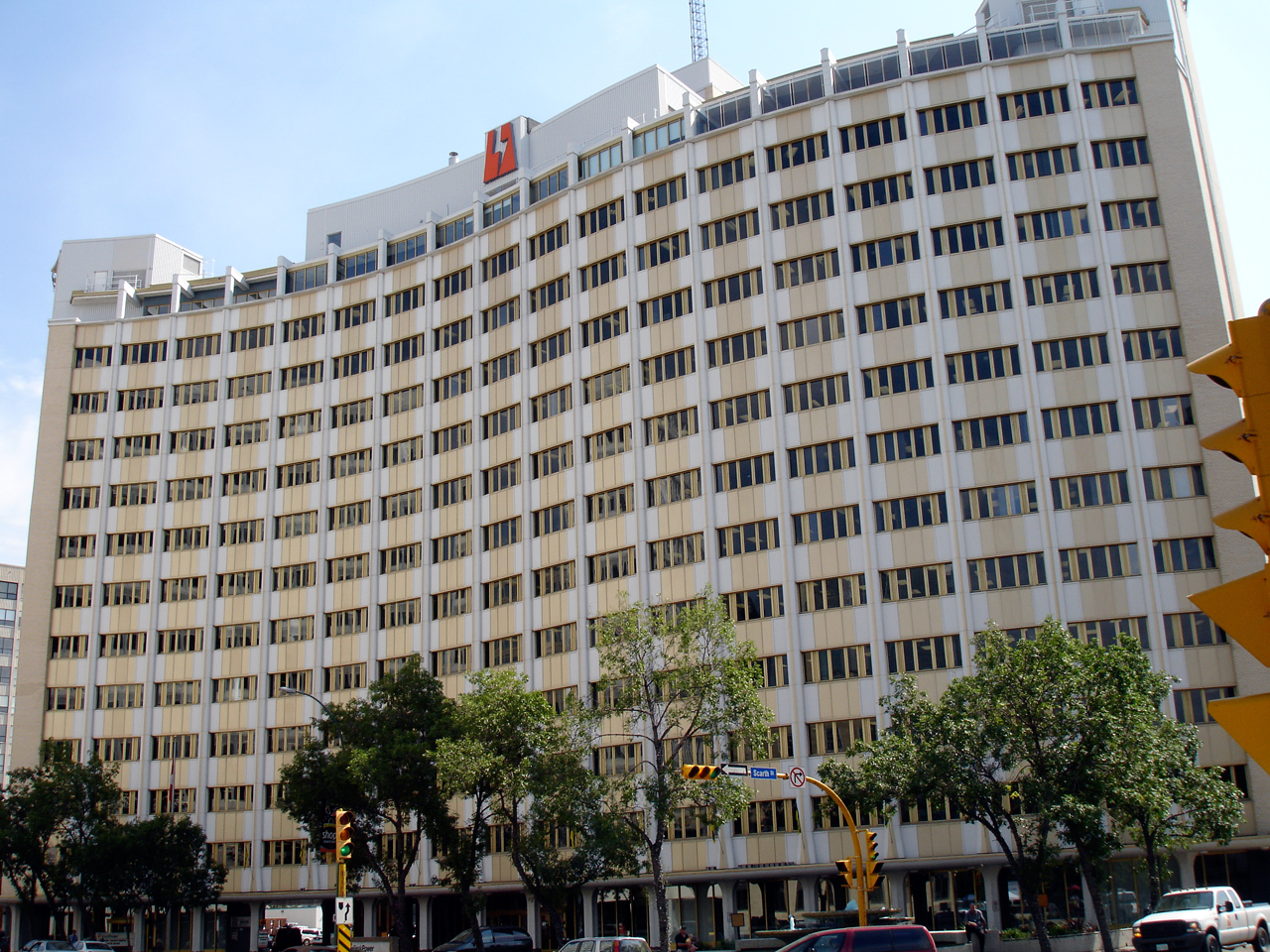
SaskPower head office in Regina

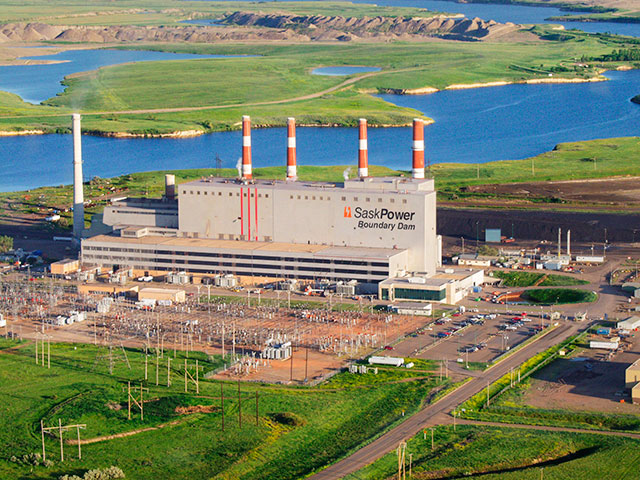
Boundary Dam Power Station

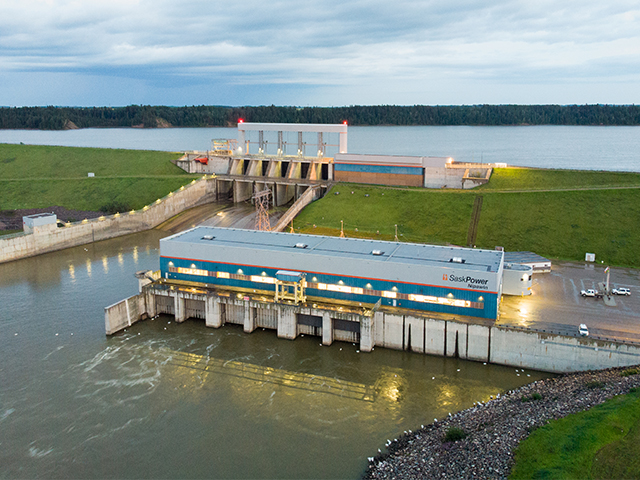
Francois Finlay Dam and Nipawin Hydroelectric Station

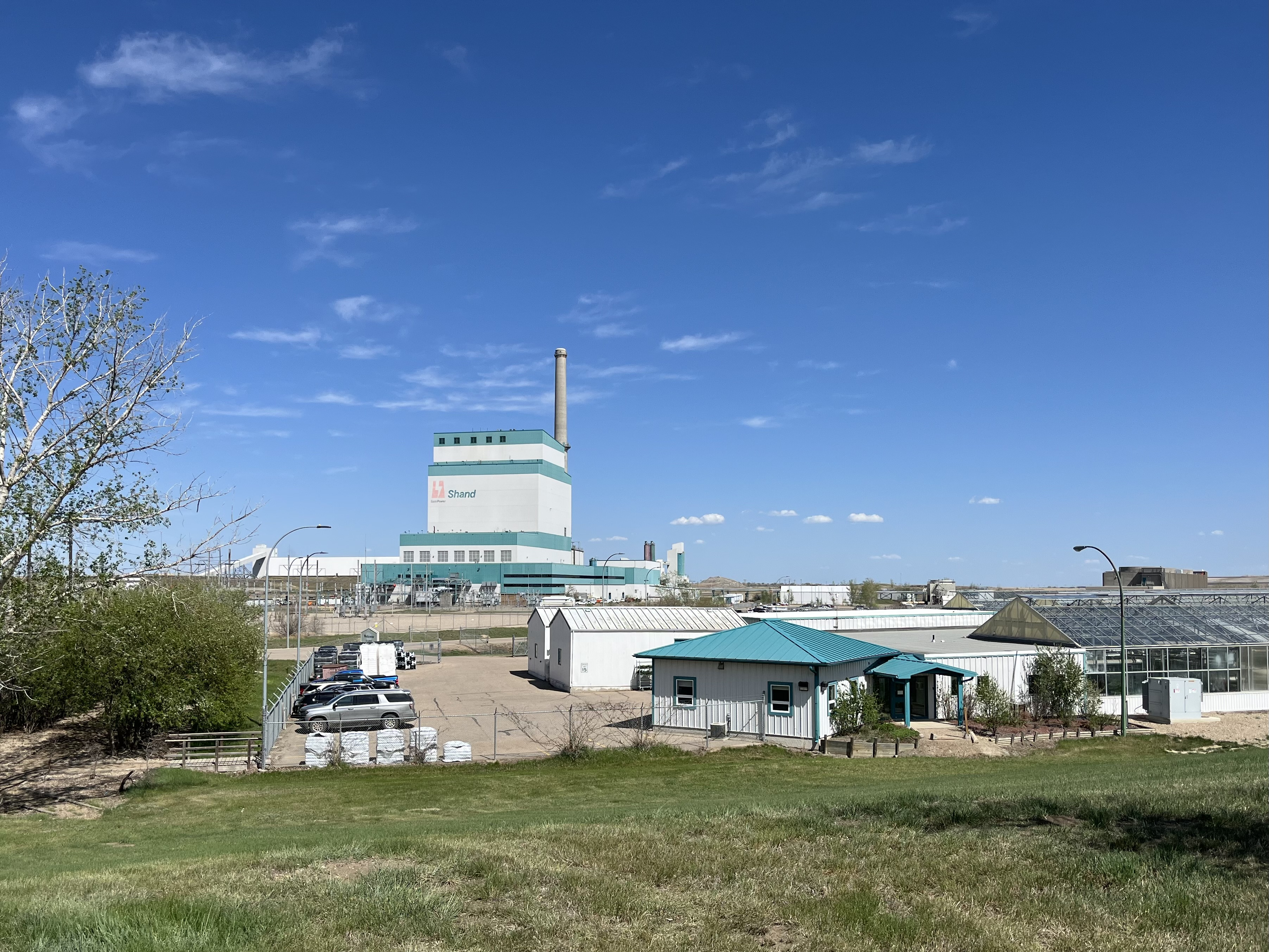
Shand Power Station and Shand Greenhouse

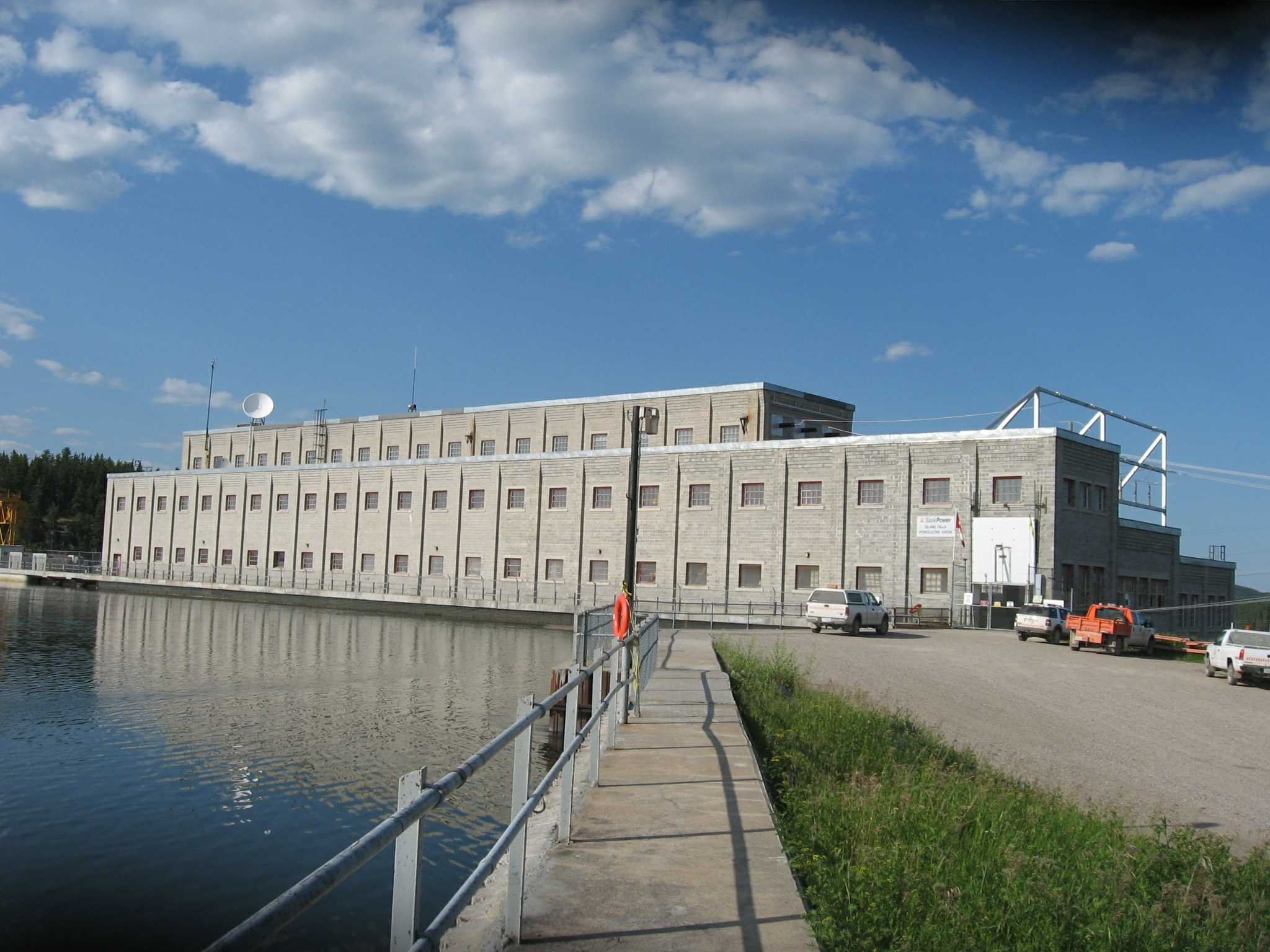
Island Falls Hydroelectric Station

Saskatchewan Power Corporation, operating as SaskPower, is the principal electric utility in Saskatchewan, Canada. Established in 1929 by the provincial government, it serves more than 550,000 customers and manages nearly $13 billion in assets. SaskPower is a major employer in the province with over 3,100 permanent full-time staff located in approximately 70 communities.

== Legal status ==
SaskPower was founded as the Saskatchewan Power Commission in 1929, becoming the Saskatchewan Power Corporation in 1949 with the passage of The Rural Electrification Act. The abbreviated name SaskPower was officially adopted as a trade name in 1987.

Owned by the government through its holding company, the Crown Investments Corporation, SaskPower is governed by a Board of Directors who are accountable to the provincial government Minister Responsible for Saskatchewan Power Corporation.

SaskPower has the exclusive right and the exclusive obligation to supply electricity in the province, except in the city of Swift Current and most of the city of Saskatoon. The Swift Current Department of Light and Power provides electrical services within the municipal boundary of Swift Current. Saskatoon Light & Power provides service to the customers within the 1958 boundaries of Saskatoon while SaskPower has responsibility for areas annexed after 1958.

== Customers ==
SaskPower serves more than 550,000 customers through more than 160,000 kilometres of power lines throughout the province and covers a service territory that includes Saskatchewan's geographic area of approximately 652,000 km^{2} (252,000 sq mi). This low customer density means that while most North American electrical utilities supply an average of 12 customers per circuit kilometre, SaskPower supplies about three. In fiscal year 2022-23, SaskPower sold 23,818 GWh of electricity for $2,844 million (CAD).

== Facilities ==
SaskPower has a total generating capacity of 5,437 megawatts (MW) from 31 generating facilities, including three coal-fired power stations, ten natural gas stations, seven hydroelectric stations, eight wind power facilities and three solar facilities. Of these 31 facilities, 12 of them are operated by Independent Power Producers who sell electricity to SaskPower through a Power Purchase Agreement.

The Chinook Power Station is a 350 MW combined-cycle natural gas power station near Swift Current that has come online in 2019.

The Boundary Dam Power Station is a coal-fired station, the number 3 boiler of which was chosen for renewal as a carbon capture and storage facility.

The SaskPower transmission system utilizes lines carrying 230,000 volts, 138,000 volts and 72,000 volts. There are 59 switching stations and 200 distribution stations on the transmission system.

SaskPower has four interconnections to Manitoba, one interconnection to North Dakota, and one interconnection to Alberta. Manitoba and North Dakota are on the same grid frequency as Saskatchewan, which means interconnections can be made directly using a normal AC transmission line. Alberta is part of WECC, so the interconnection relies on an AC/DC-AC link via the McNeill HVDC Back-to-back station.

In 2022, SaskPower signed an agreement with Southwest Power Pool to increase transmission capacity between Saskatchewan and the United States. The agreement enables the import and export of up to 650 MW of power starting in 2027.

== Rural areas ==
Incorporated under The Power Corporation Act (1949), SaskPower purchased the majority of the province's small, independent municipal electrical utilities and integrated them into a province-wide grid. It was also responsible under The Rural Electrification Act (1949) for the electrification of the province's rural areas, bringing electricity to over 66,000 farms between 1949 and 1966. To manage the high costs of electrifying the province's sparsely populated rural areas, SaskPower used a large-scale implementation of a single wire ground return distribution system, claimed to be a pioneering effort (although some utilities in the USA had been using such a system on its rural lines). It was at the time one of the largest such systems in the world. One of the last cities in the province added to SaskPower's system was North Portal in 1971 (which had been served up to this point from Montana-Dakota Utilities' distribution system in Portal, ND just across the border).

== Subsidiaries ==
- NorthPoint Energy Solutions Inc., located in Regina, Saskatchewan is a wholly owned subsidiary of SaskPower and is SaskPower's wholesale energy marketing agent. NorthPoint began operation on Nov. 1, 2001. NorthPoint handles the import and export of power on the North American Market.
- SaskPower International is a wholly owned subsidiary of SaskPower that invests in non-crown utility assets. They previously owned a 30% stake in MRM Cogeneration Station at Athabasca Oil Sands Project's Muskeg River Mine north of Fort McMurray, and previously owned a 50% stake in Cory Cogeneration Station before the complete ownership was bought by SaskPower.

== Rural electrification ==
SaskPower was founded by an Act of the provincial legislature as the Saskatchewan Power Commission in 1929. The purpose of the Commission was to research how best to create a provincial power system which would provide the province's residents with safe, reliable electric service.

A provincial power system was desirable for many reasons. In the early days of electricity in the province of Saskatchewan, electricity was largely unavailable outside of larger centres. Most electrical utilities were owned either privately or by municipalities, and none of them were interconnected. Because each utility operated independently, rates often varied significantly between communities – anywhere from 4 to 45 cents per kilowatt hour in the mid-1920s. The rapid growth in the province's population in the first decades of the century – from 91,279 to 757,510 within 20 years – had led to a sharp increase in the demand for electricity. Finally, the provincial government had determined that the lack of inexpensive power was hampering the development of industry in the province.

While the Commission began purchasing independently owned electrical utilities with the goal of interconnecting them, the economic situation of the 1930s and the labour shortage caused by the Second World War delayed the creation of a provincial power system for nearly two decades.

By 1948, the Commission operated 35 generating stations and more than 8,800 km of transmission lines. However, most farm families who had electricity generated it themselves using battery systems charged by wind turbines or gasoline- or diesel-powered generators. Across the province, only 1,500 farms were connected to the electrical grid, most of them because of their proximity to the lines that linked cities and larger towns.

In 1949, by an Act of the Provincial Legislature, the Commission became the Saskatchewan Power Corporation. The first task of the new Corporation was to purchase what remained of the province's small, independent electrical utilities and to begin integrating them into a province-wide electrical grid.

The final step in creating a truly province-wide grid was to electrify the province's vast rural areas. The primary hurdle to rural electrification was the very low customer density in the province – approximately one farm customer per network mile (1.6 km) – and the extremely high cost of a network of the scale required by the vast distances between customers. After much study, the Corporation adopted a single wire ground return distribution scheme, which lowered the cost of rural electrification significantly.

The first year of the program set the goal of connecting 1200 rural customers to the network. The experience gained during the first years led to an increased rate of connections every year, leading to a peak yearly connection rate in 1956 of 7,800 customers. By 1961, 58,000 farms were connected, and by 1966 when the program concluded, the Corporation had provided power to a total of 66,000 rural customers. In addition, hundreds of schools, churches and community halls received electrical service during this period.

== Corporate governance ==
SaskPower is governed by a board of directors that is responsible to the Minister Responsible for Saskatchewan Power Corporation. The board gets appointed by the lieutenant governor of Saskatchewan. In February 2024, the directors of the corporation included: Chief Darcy Bear (Chair), Bryan Leverick (Vice-Chair), Neil Henneberg (Corporate Secretary), Terry Bergan, Amber Biemans, Shawn Grice, Cherilyn Jolly-Nagel, Fred Mathewson, Rob Nicolay, Jeff Richards, Stephanie Yong and the Honourable Vaughn Solomon Schofield.

=== Leadership ===
- Robert Watson (2010-2014)
- Mike Marsh (2014-2021)
- Rupen Pandya (2022-present)

== Unions representing SaskPower employees ==
- IBEW Local 2067 represents approximately 45% of SaskPower's employees
- Unifor Local 649 represents approximately 16% of SaskPower's employees

== Emissions Reductions ==
By 2030, SaskPower plans to reduce their greenhouse gas emissions by over 50% compared to 2005. The corporation is also on track to achieve net-zero GHG emissions by 2050 or earlier.

In 2012, the Harper government introduced regulations to start phasing out coal-fired power plants in Canada. These regulations set an emissions limit for coal-fired generating units of 420 tonnes of CO_{2} per GWh. The limit was to be imposed in 2015 on all new coal units, and would also apply to units built before 1975 starting in 2020, and to units built before 1986 starting in 2030, and would also apply to all units once they reach 50 years of age regardless of the aforementioned dates.

In 2014, SaskPower rebuilt Boundary Dam unit 3 with a CCS system capable of capturing 90% of the CO_{2} emissions of the unit, and 100% of the SO_{2} emissions.

In 2018, the Trudeau government accelerated the coal phase-out by mandating that all coal units must shut down by 2030, regardless of the year they were built. The Trudeau government also implemented a nationwide carbon tax that made it more-expensive for SaskPower to operate both coal and natural gas plants in comparison to hydro, wind, and solar facilities.

The federal coal regulations mentioned above would have meant that Boundary Dam units 4 and 5 would need to close at the end of 2019. However, in 2019 the Moe government was able to negotiate an equivalency agreement with the Trudeau government that allowed Boundary Dam unit 4 to run until the end of 2021 and Boundary Dam unit 5 until the end of 2024 due to SaskPower's investments into CCS technology on unit 3.

To fill the gap in firm baseload capacity created by the retirement of conventional coal, SaskPower is relying on the new natural gas and import contracts. Additional supply options that are currently available include wind and solar, and at a smaller scale biomass, flare gas, and distributed generation options like residential solar from net metering. The corporation is also exploring additional low- and non-GHG emitting supply options including Saskatchewan hydro, and new technologies like CCS on natural gas and nuclear power from small modular reactors (SMR).

The government of Canada’s proposed Clean Electricity Regulations (CER) would require SaskPower to reduce its GHG emissions to net zero by 2035. CER will impact 2,900 MW of baseload and dispatchable generation capacity. It’s expected this would significantly hinder the corporation’s ability to serve its customers during peak demand periods.

In addition to building new generators and interconnections to reduce emissions, SaskPower also implements energy efficiency and demand-side management (DSM) programs to reduce electricity use. Since 2008, SaskPower’s DSM programs have reduced peak demand for electricity in Saskatchewan by 157 MW.

== Works cited ==
- SaskPower (April 2013). One company. One Focus: SaskPower Annual Report 2012 (PDF). Regina. Archived from the original (PDF) on October 6, 2013.
- SaskPower (July 2019). SaskPower Annual Report (2018-19): Navigating a Changing Energy Landscape (PDF). Regina.
