= Cold Lake First Nations =

First Nations band government in Alberta, Canada

- Band No. 464
- Łue Chok Tué
- People: Dënesųłı̨né
- Treaty: Treaty 6
- Headquarters: Cold Lake
- Province: Alberta

Land
- Main reserve: Cold Lake 149
- Reserves: Cold Lake 149A; Cold Lake 149B; Cold Lake 149C; Blue Quills
- Land area: 208.53 km^{2} (80.51 sq mi)

Population
- On reserve: 1322
- On other land: 1
- Off reserve: 1637
- Total population: 2960

Government
- Chief: Kelsey Jacko
- Council size: 6

Tribal Council
- Tribal Chiefs Ventures Limited (fr)

Website
- clfns.com

The Cold Lake First Nations is a First Nations band government. This band is the governing body for people descended from several different historic groups, hence the plural, nations, used in the band's name. In August 2019, there were 2,960 members of this band, of which 1,322 lived within five reserves, about 220 square kilometres (85 sq mi) large within the province of Alberta.

The Dënesųłiné of Cold Lake occupy the territory around present-day Cold Lake, Alberta, in the northeast of the province close to the Saskatchewan border. They are the only Chipewyan community who are signatory to Treaty Six and are somewhat isolated from other Chipewyan. Their closest Chipewyan neighbors are situated at Ejerésche or Dillon, Saskatchewan and K'ái K'oz Desé or Janvier, Alberta, both of which are approximately 5 hours away by motor vehicle.

== History ==
=== Early history ===
Oral traditions of the Cold Lake First Nations reach back in time and in traditions similar to those we can expect at the end of the last ice age. Prehistoric artifacts, such as stone tools and pottery, have been dated to over 5,000 years old. Researchers have also discovered a pre-Columbian campsite covering about 1,200 square metres along the lakeshore at English Bay. Locally known as Berry Point, the area has been used by the Denesuline for fishing, hunting and gathering medicines since time immemorial. The bones of their ancestors are buried in grave sites there.

=== Fur trade ===
The Denesuline of Cold Lake were traditionally a nomadic people who lived off the land by hunting and gathering. Wetlands, prairie and boreal forest made up their homelands in this eco-region and was indeed plentiful in food. During the fur trade era, they trapped in and around Primrose Lake and Cold Lake where there was an abundance in fur-bearing animals such as beaver and muskrat

In 1716, the peoples in the Cold Lake area were supposedly attacked for the first time by fur trading Cree, who had become owners of firearms by trading with Europeans. Not before 1800 the groups around Cold Lake started to trade with Europeans on their own, but then they travelled to the trading posts on the Hudson Bay and even to Hochelaga on the Saint Lawrence River.

=== Treaty No. 6 of the Numbered Treaties ===
The Government of Canada negotiated with Woodland and Plains Cree, and some Nakota as well as with the Denesuline Peoples around Cold Lake. Treaty 6, which covers modern-day central Alberta and Saskatchewan, was signed in 1876 at Carlton and Fort Pitt.

A Cree decided to go to a piece of land at Willow Point, a territory reaching about 20 miles (32 km) south and westwards. It included the Cold Lake, which the Denesuline called Luwe Chok Tuwe or Łue Chok Tué and where they spent the summers, while the winters were spent on Primrose Lake (called in the Chipewyan language Xah Tué).

When chief Uldahi died in June 1882, he had no successor. Consequently, the group dwelling at Heart Lake elected its own chiefs and headmen. They also tried to get a reserve of their own. On a hill above Reiter Creek they gathered in the summer of 1913 and elected Alexi Janvier (Nanuchele) as their chief. At the end of the First World War people coming back from Europe's battlefields brought with them the Spanish flu. Nearly half of the population died.

=== North-West Rebellion ===
After the Frog Lake Massacre of May 1885, the band's main group fled to the Cold Lake in fear of revenge. Despite moderation of a priest, the militia disarmed the tribe. Women and children were sent to a camp on Reiter Creek, while the men stayed in the army's camp. When the band returned to the Cold Lake, they met another armed unit there. The oral tradition tells about a mass execution, which was averted in a last-minute decision.

In 1890 many Chipewyan families went from Heart Lake (Saskatchewan) to Primrose Lake, as they were used to do traditionally, but this time they stayed there permanently.

When land surveys started in 1902 the Indians of Cold Lake were still suspected to have participated in the North-West Rebellion. The responsible Indian agent believed that their territory was much too large for only 330 members of the tribe. Their territory was reduced to 73 square miles (190 km^{2}). In exchange for not losing their fishing rights, they swapped their 16 square miles (41 km^{2}) of land in the south of the Beaver River with a piece of land on the Cold Lake, to be more precise the English Bay. At the same time French settlers came to the French Bay.

=== Cold War and Cold Lake Air Weapons Range ===
During the Cold War the Royal Canadian Air Force was looking for a test area and found it around Primrose Lake. The people living there were offered compensation.

While the most modern techniques were introduced on CFB Cold Lake, the first power line was not installed before 1964.

== Buffalo Treaty ==
In September 2024, they became a signatory to the Buffalo Treaty.

== Reserves ==
The largest reserve today is Cold Lake 149 in the east of Bonnyville (145.281 km^{2}). There are other reserves, like the one of 4134 ha on the Beaver Creek (149B), 96.2 ha of the territory of the Blue Quills First Nation Indian Reserve, 71.6 ha on the southern shore of Cold Lake (149A) and 149C, and the land meant as a kind of compensation for the Air Base, which consists of 2023.5 ha.
