= Hirtz Lake =

Lake in Saskatchewan, Canada

- Location in Saskatchewan Hirtz Lake (Canada)
- Location: Meadow Lake Provincial Park, Saskatchewan
- Coordinates: 54.4834°N 109.8175°W
- Part of: Churchill River drainage basin
- Basin countries: Canada
- Surface area: 159.8 ha (395 acres)
- Max. depth: 13.5 m (44 ft)
- Shore length^{1}: 5.5 km (3.4 mi)
- Surface elevation: 544 m (1,785 ft)
- ^{1} Shore length is not a well-defined measure.

Hirtz Lake is a small lake in the Canadian province of Saskatchewan. It is surrounded by Boreal forest within Meadow Lake Provincial Park. The lake is fed by several streams with its outflow at the eastern end. The outflow travels east and empties into Pierce Lake, a lake along the course of the Cold River. Access is from Highway 919.

On the eastern shore is a small, rustic "leave-no-trace" campground with minimal services. The campground, accessed from Highway 919, has lake access, a picnic area, and 10 campsites.

== Fish species ==
Fish commonly found in Hirtz Lake include walleye, northern pike, lake whitefish, and yellow perch. In each of the years 2015, 2017, 2019, and 2024, the lake was stocked with 100,000 walleye.

== See also ==
- List of lakes of Saskatchewan
- Tourism in Saskatchewan
