= Lake Johnston =

Lake Johnston may refer to:

== Places ==
In Australia

- Lake Johnston (Western Australia), a lake in the Mallee (biogeographic region)

In Canada

- Rural Municipality of Lake Johnston No. 102, Saskatchewan
- Johnston Lake, a lake in Saskatchewan
