= Cold River (Saskatchewan) =

River in Saskatchewan, Canada

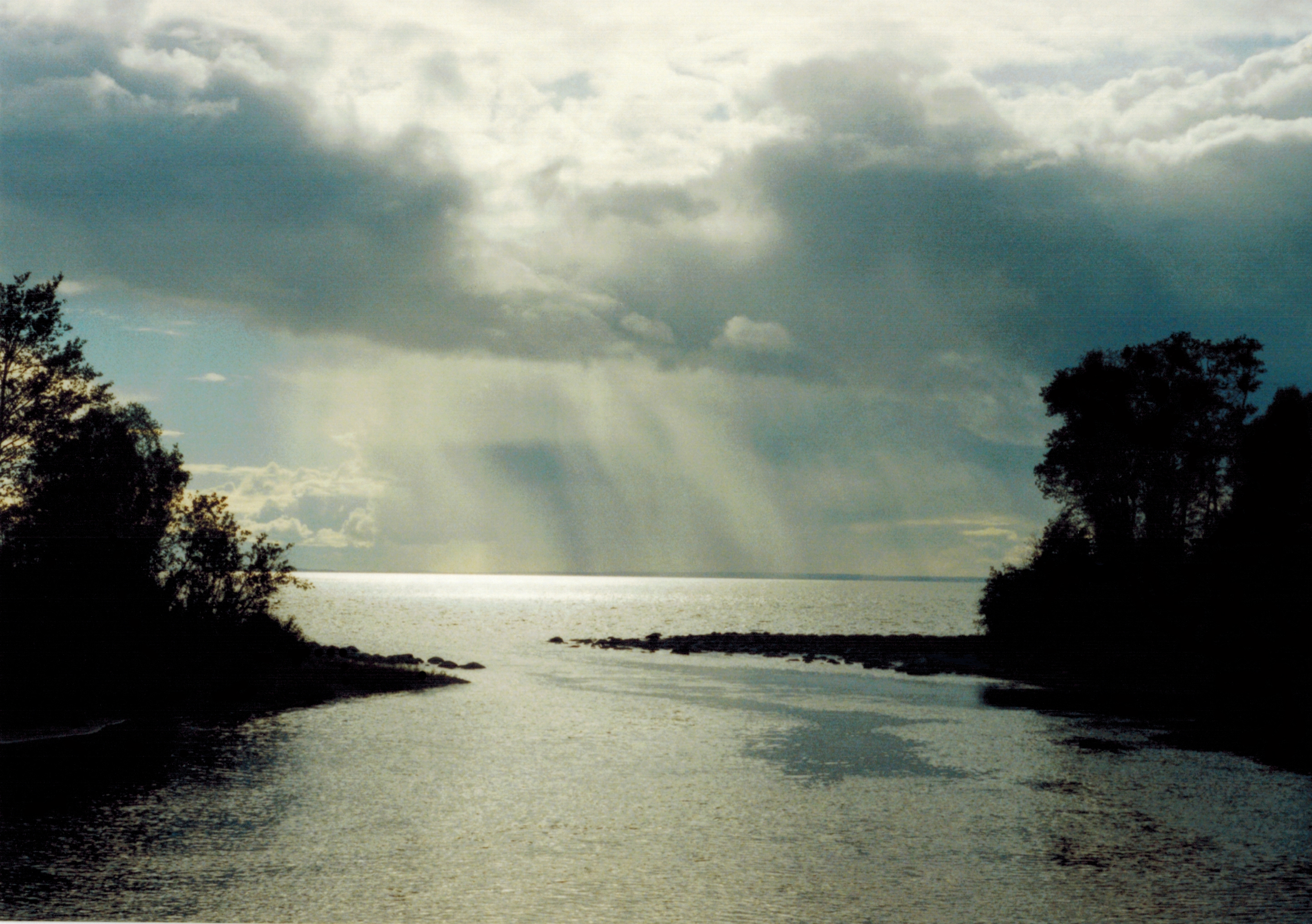
- Cold River at its source, Cold Lake

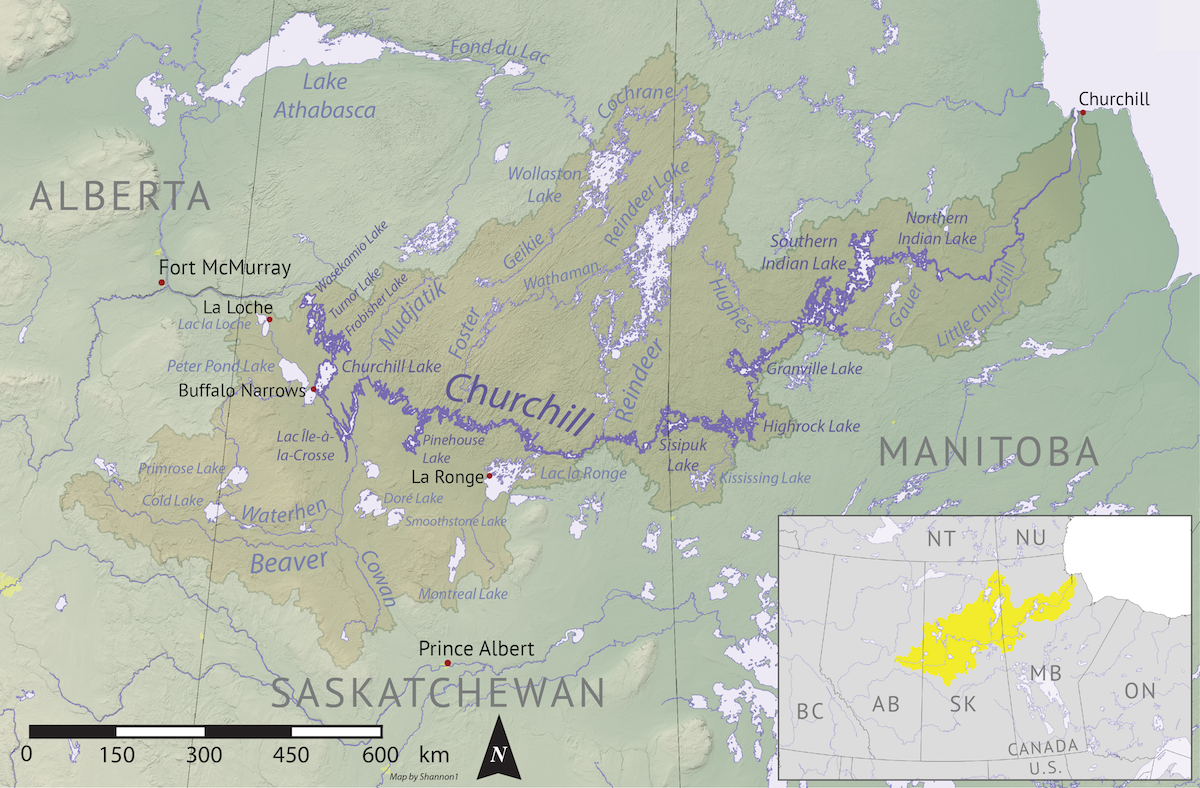
- Churchill River drainage basin

- Location of the mouth in Saskatchewan Cold River (Saskatchewan) (Canada)

Location
- Country: Canada
- Provinces: Saskatchewan

Physical characteristics
- Source: Cold Lake
  - location: Meadow Lake Provincial Park
  - coordinates: 54.5657°N 109.8426°W
  - elevation: 535 m (1,755 ft)
- Mouth: Lac des Îles
  - location: Meadow Lake Provincial Park
  - coordinates: 54.4567°N 109.5286°W
  - elevation: 496 m (1,627 ft)

Basin features
- Progression: Waterhen River; Beaver River; Churchill River
- River system: Churchill River drainage basin
- Tributaries
  - left: Tukayaw Creek
- Waterbodies: Pierce Lake; Lepine Lake

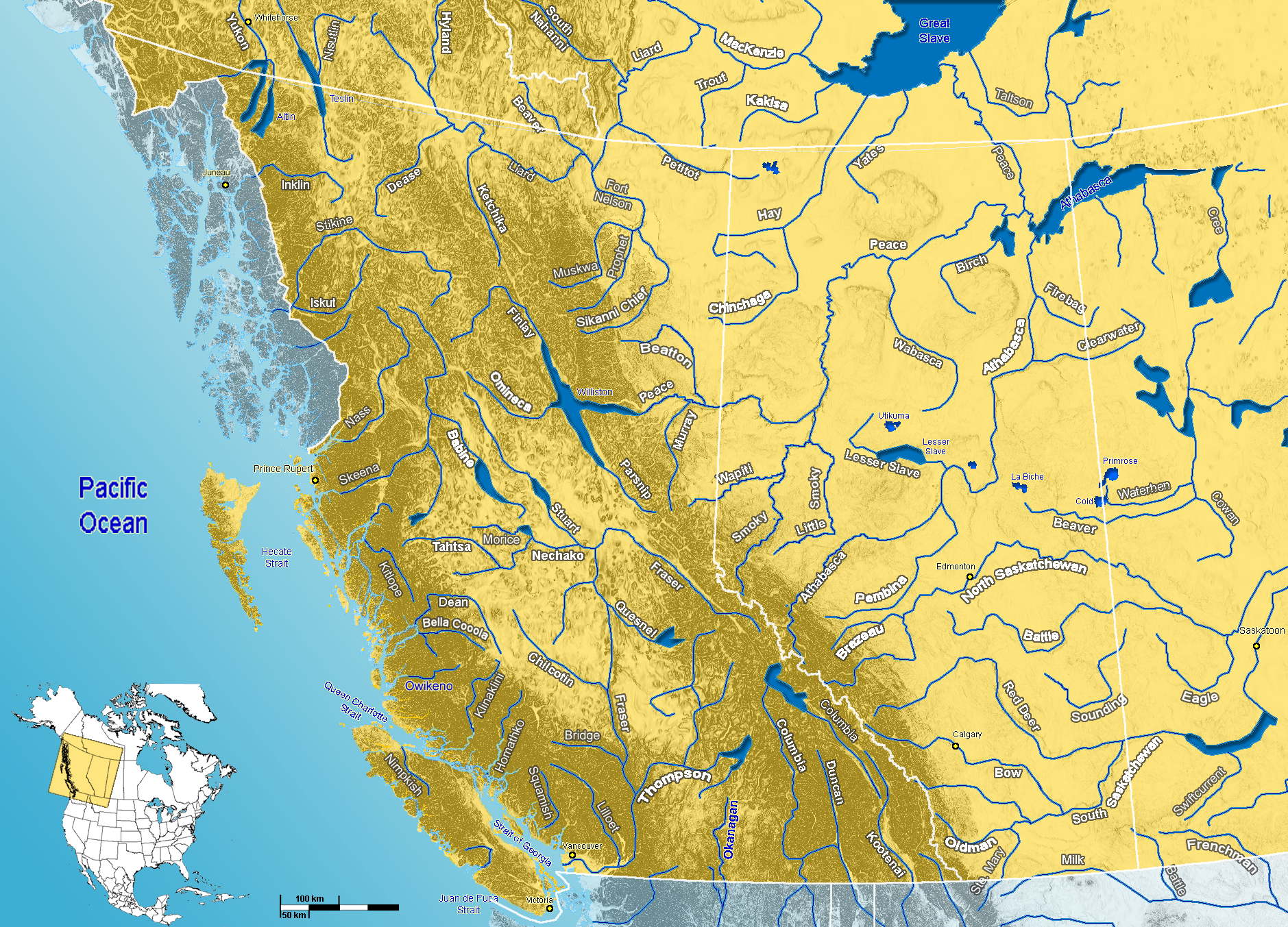
Western Canada rivers

Cold River is a river in the Canadian province of Saskatchewan. The river's source is Cold Lake, which is a large lake on the provincial border of Saskatchewan and Alberta, and its mouth is at the western end of Lac des Îles in Meadow Lake Provincial Park. It is an east flowing river and the entirety of its course is in Meadow Lake Provincial Park and the boreal forest.

== Description ==
Cold River is one section of a series of rivers that begin at Primrose Lake in Saskatchewan and end up at Beaver River. Beaver River is a major tributary of the Churchill River, which begins in Alberta, flows across Saskatchewan, through Manitoba and into the Hudson Bay. Primrose Lake's outflow, Martineau River, flows into Cold Lake. Cold River flows out of Cold Lake at the eastern shore and flows east. Along its course are two lakes, Pierce and Lepine. After continuing east after Lepine Lake, Cold River empties into Lac des Îles. Lac des Îles' outflow is Waterhen River, which flows eastward into Beaver River. Beaver River flows north and meets the Churchill River at Lac Île-à-la-Crosse.

== Access ==
The Big Island Lake Cree Territory borders the south-eastern shore of Lepine Lake and the southern bank of Cold River from Lepine Lake to Lac des Îles. At its western end, near its source, is a small campground and the start of the Boreal Trail. Highway 919 follows the course of Cold River from its source to the east end of Pierce Lake at Howe Bay. At Howe Bay, there is a lodge and the 24-kilometre marker for the Boreal Trail. The lodge is accessed from Highways 950 and 919. Highway 21 meets 950 near the lodge. Highway 950 then crosses Cold River between Pierce and Lepine Lakes then heads east towards Lac des Îles.

== See also ==
- List of rivers of Saskatchewan
- Hudson Bay drainage basin
- Tourism in Saskatchewan
- North American fur trade
