= Big Island Lake Cree Territory =

Indian reserve in Saskatchewan, Canada

Coordinates: 54°25′25″N 109°36′17″W

- Indian reserve
- Big Island Lake Cree Territory Indian Reserve
- Location in Saskatchewan
- First Nation: Big Island Lake
- Country: Canada
- Province: Saskatchewan

Area
  - Total: 4,700.1 ha (11,614 acres)

Population (2016)
  - Total: 808
  - Density: 17.2/km^{2} (44.5/sq mi)
- Community Well-Being Index: 37

Big Island Lake Cree Territory is an Indian reserve of the Big Island Lake Cree Nation in Saskatchewan. It is 39 kilometres (24 mi) east of Cold Lake, Alberta. The reserve is adjacent to Meadow Lake Provincial Park and bounded to the north and east by Lepine Lake, Cold River, and Lac des Îles.

In the 2016 Canadian Census, it recorded a population of 808 living in 132 of its 165 total private dwellings. In the same year, its Community Well-Being index was calculated at 37 of 100, compared to 58.4 for the average First Nations community and 77.5 for the average non-Indigenous community.

== See also ==
- List of Indian reserves in Saskatchewan
