= Martineau River =

River in Saskatchewan and Alberta, Canada

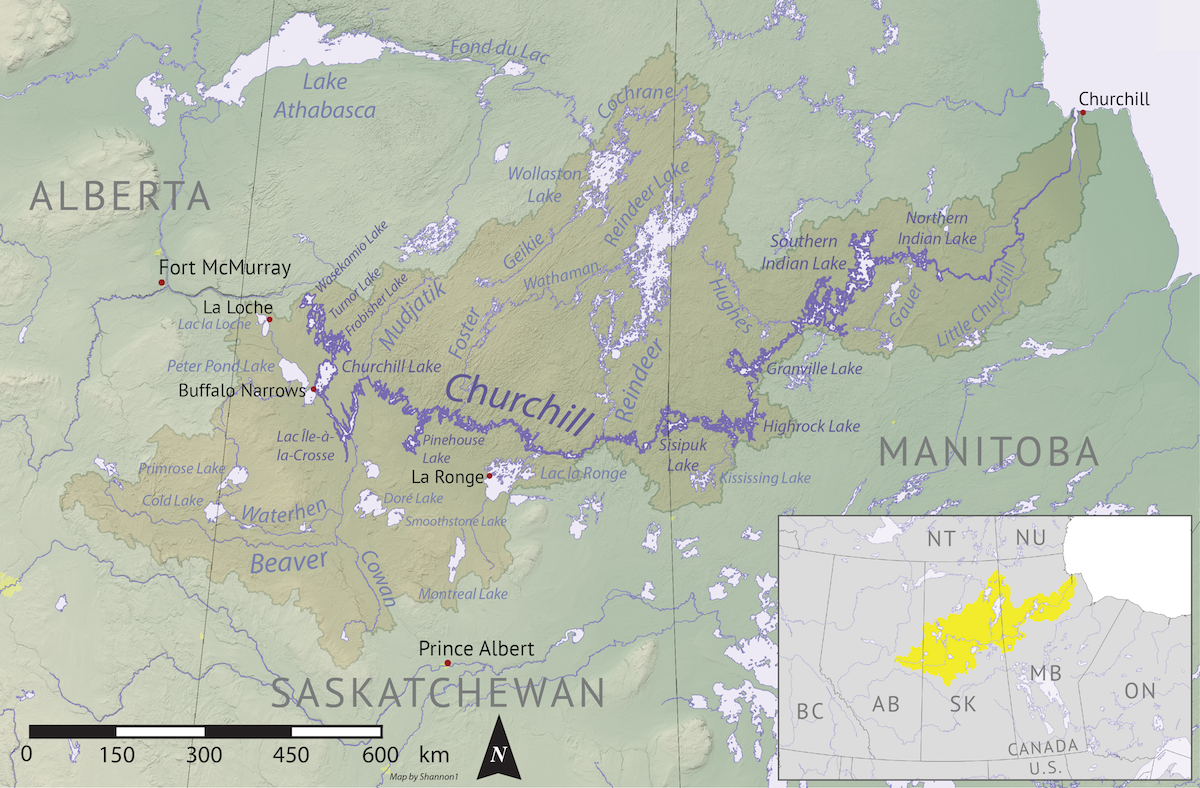
- Churchill River drainage basin

- Location of the mouth in Alberta Martineau River (Alberta)

Location
- Country: Canada
- Provinces: Saskatchewan, Alberta

Physical characteristics
- Source: Primrose Lake
  - coordinates: 54.8459°N 109.69262°W
  - elevation: 559 metres
- Mouth: Cold Lake
  - coordinates: 54.62335°N 110.03272°W
  - elevation: 535 metres

Basin features
- River system: Cold River drainage basin
- Tributaries
  - left: Muskeg River

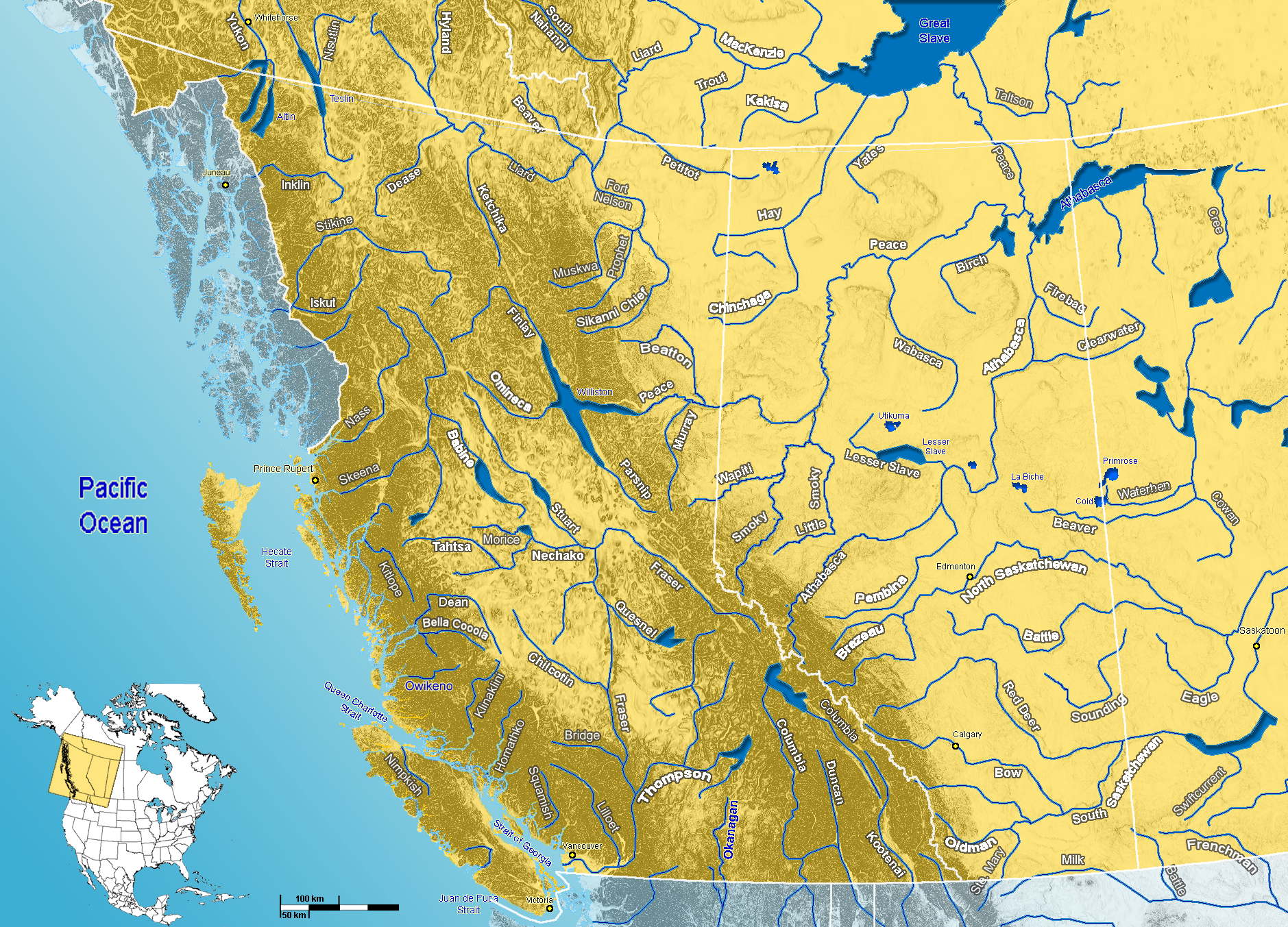
Western Canada rivers

Martineau River is a river in the Canadian provinces of Saskatchewan and Alberta. Its source is at Primrose Lake in north-western Saskatchewan and its mouth is at Cold Lake in Alberta. The river travels in a south-westerly direction through muskeg and the boreal forest ecozone of Canada The majority of the river and its tributaries are in Saskatchewan with only the final leg being in Alberta.

Martineau River is joined by several smaller creeks and rivers en route to Cold Lake, including the Muskeg River, Kesatasew River, Middle Creek, and Ustookumin Creek. Several lakes, including Muskeg, Wotherspoon, Matisekawe, Kesatasew, Ethelwyn, and Lost Lakes are within the river's drainage basin. Part of the western portion of the Mostoos Hills, which are east of Primrose Lake and north of Meadow Lake Provincial Park, are also within Martineau's drainage basin.

Martineau River is the first one in a series of rivers that connect from Primrose Lake to Lac Île-à-la-Crosse and the Churchill River, which is a major river in the Hudson Bay drainage basin. The other rivers in the series include Cold River, which drains Cold Lake and flows east and empties into Lac des Îles. Lac des Îles is the source of the Waterhen River, which is a tributary of the Beaver River. Beaver River flows north and into Lac Île-à-la-Crosse and the Churchill River.

== Fish ==
The most common fish in the river include lake trout, walleye, and northern pike.

== See also ==
- List of rivers of Saskatchewan
- List of rivers of Alberta
- Hudson Bay drainage basin
