= Cold Lake (Alberta) =

Lake in western Canada

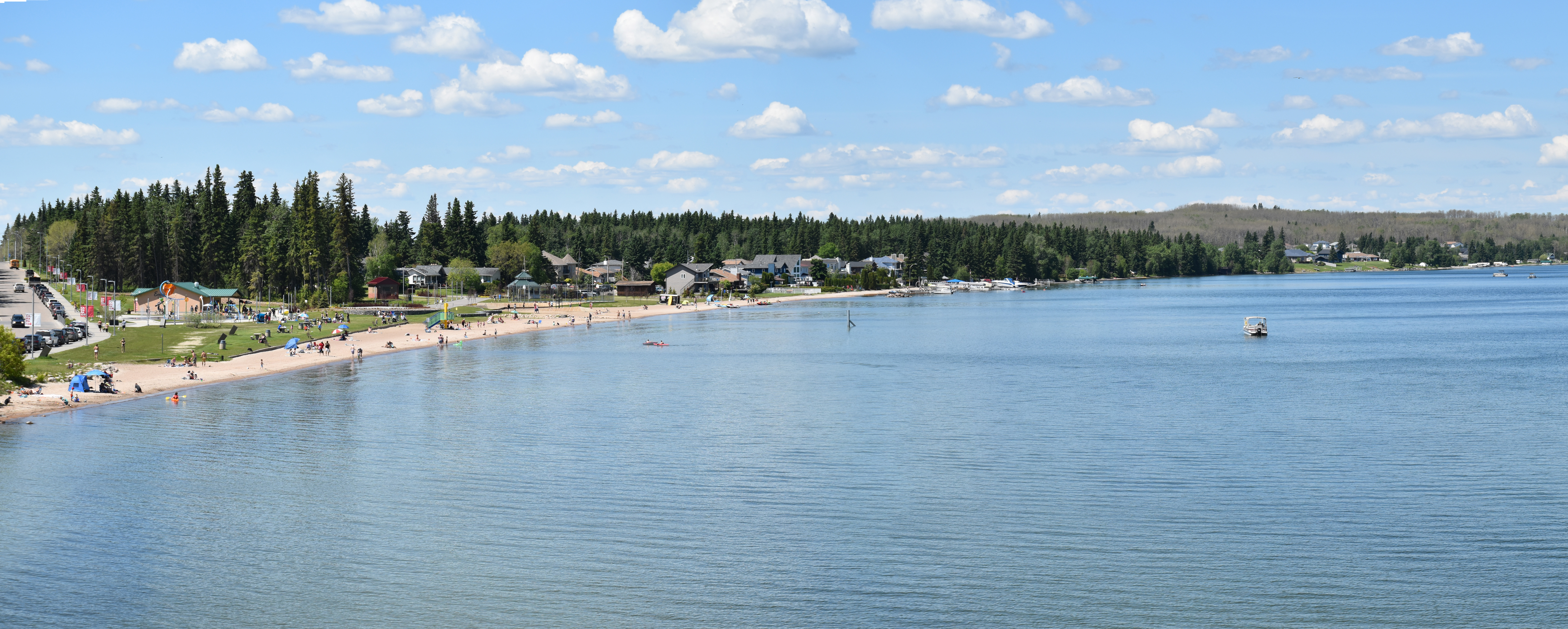
- Kinosoo Beach on the edge of Cold Lake

- Location in Alberta Cold Lake (Canada)
- Location: Bonnyville No. 87, Alberta / Beaver River No. 622, Saskatchewan
- Coordinates: 54°33′N 110°03′W
- Type: Mesotrophic
- Part of: Churchill River drainage basin
- Primary inflows: Martineau River; Medley River
- Primary outflows: Cold River
- Catchment area: 6,140 km^{2} (2,370 sq mi)
- Basin countries: Canada
- Surface area: 373 km^{2} (144 sq mi)
- Average depth: 49.9 m (164 ft)
- Max. depth: 99.1 m (325 ft)
- Shore length^{1}: 142.14 km (88.32 mi)
- Surface elevation: 535 m (1,755 ft)
- Islands: Murray Island
- Settlements: City of Cold Lake
- ^{1} Shore length is not a well-defined measure.

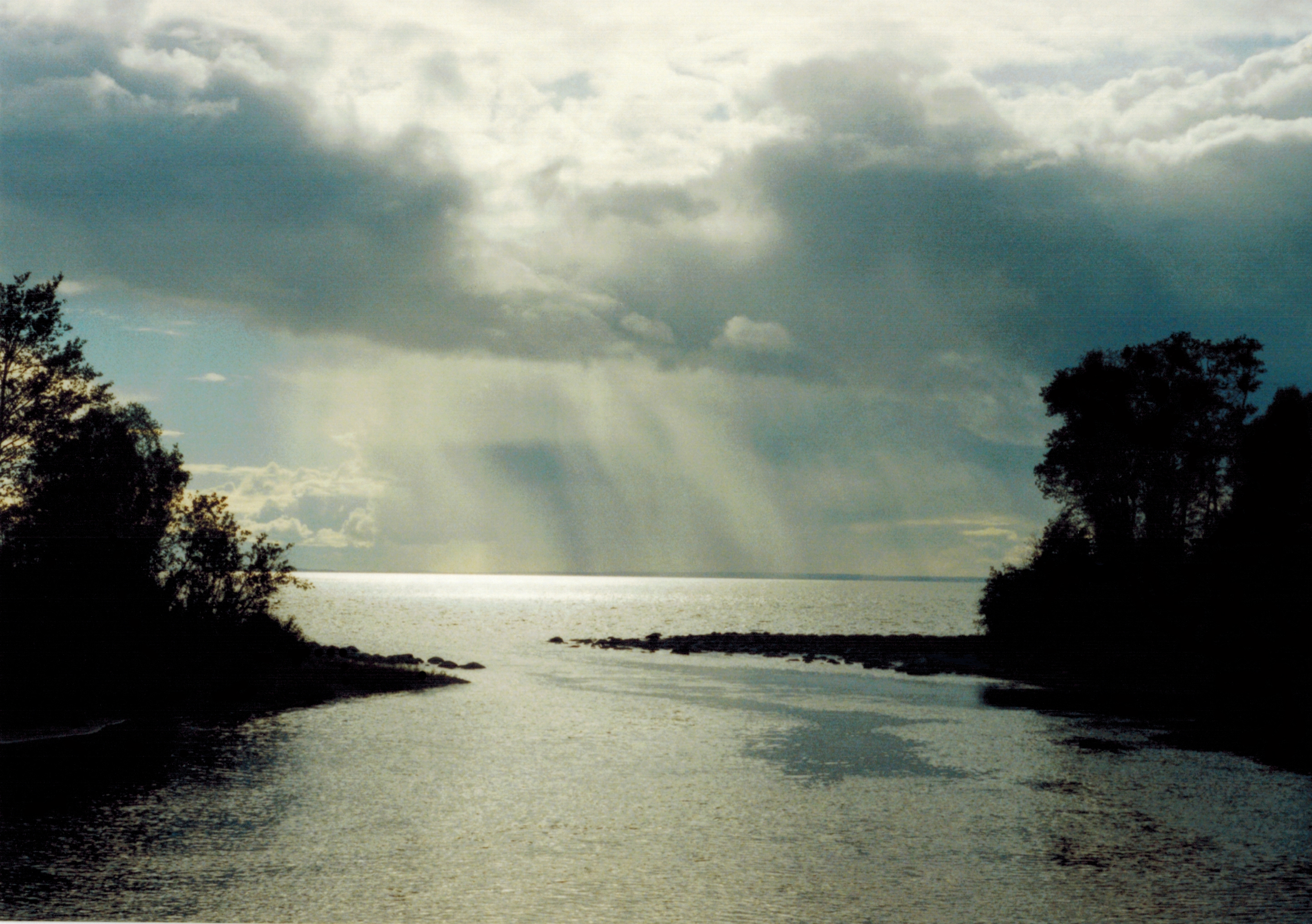
Cold Lake viewed from Meadow Lake Provincial Park, Saskatchewan

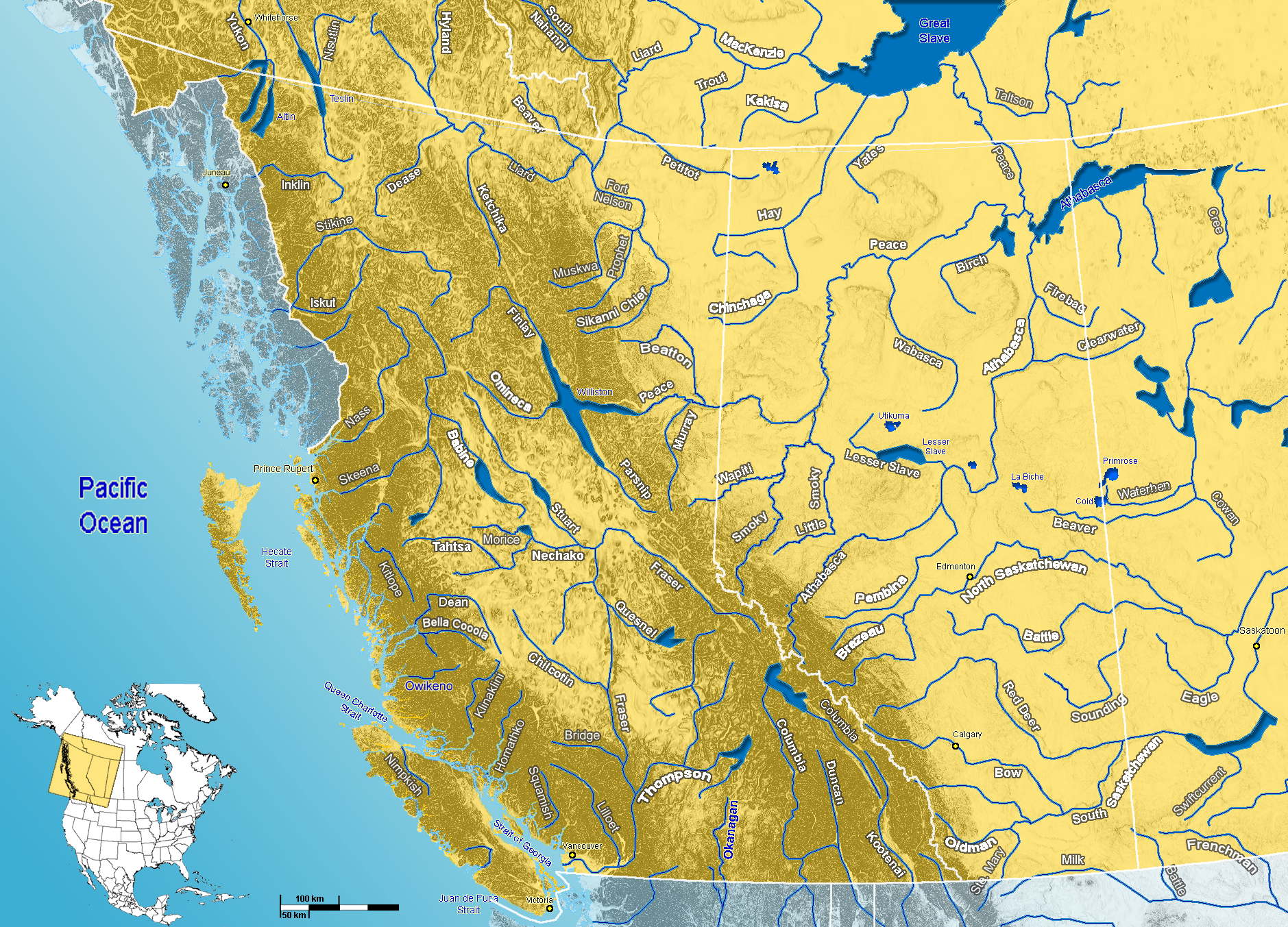
Major rivers of western Canada

Cold Lake is a large lake in Northern Alberta and Saskatchewan, Canada. Most of the lake is within Alberta. It is one of the deepest lakes in Alberta with a maximum depth of 99.1 metres (325 ft). It has around 24 known species of fish and is a major ice fishing lake. Cold Lake is also major stop for many migrating birds, and is home to one of the largest warbler populations in Alberta. The city of Cold Lake is the largest community on the lake.

== Description ==
Cold Lake has a total surface area of 373 square kilometres (144 sq mi), 248 square kilometres (96 sq mi) of which is in Alberta. Except for the western shore, the lake is surrounded by protected areas such as the Cold Lake Provincial Park in Alberta and the Meadow Lake Provincial Park in Saskatchewan.

The city of Cold Lake is located on the south-western shore while the Cold Lake 149A and B Indian reserves of the Cold Lake First Nations are on the western and southern shores respectively. Cold Lake House was a trading post built by the Montreal traders in 1781 near present-day Beaver Crossing, Alberta, south of Cold Lake.

The Martineau River flows from Primrose Lake into Cold Lake, which in turn discharges through the Cold River. The Cold River travels through a series of lakes in Meadow Lake Provincial Park and ends as it empties into Lac des Îles. The Waterhen River, which is a major tributary of Beaver River, is the primary outflow for Lac des Îles and it continues east where it meets Beaver River, a major tributary of the Churchill River.

The lake has a native legend of a large lake monster, the "kinosoo", with many residents claiming to have evidence or have seen it.

== Fossil record ==
Cold Lake preserves an extensive fossil and subfossil record from the latest part of the Late Pleistocene, after the Last Glacial Maximum, to the Late Holocene. By the Middle Holocene, the mammalian fauna that lived in the region was in essence a modern one.

== Fish species ==
Fish species include walleye, sauger, yellow perch, northern pike, lake trout, lake whitefish, cisco, burbot, white sucker, and longnose sucker. Both Alberta and Saskatchewan angling licences are valid on the entire lake.

== See also ==
- Ethel Lake
- List of lakes of Alberta
- List of lakes of Saskatchewan
- Tourism in Saskatchewan
