= Big Island Lake Cree Nation =

Cree First Nation in Saskatchewan, Canada

- Band No. 399
- People: Cree
- Treaty: Treaty 6
- Headquarters: Pierceland
- Province: Saskatchewan

Land
- Other reserve: Big Island Lake Cree Territory
- Land area: 47.001 km^{2} (18.147 sq mi)

Population (2021)
- On reserve: 887
- Off reserve: 379
- Total population: 1266

Government
- Chief: David Sandfly
- Council: Carvey Sandfly; Donna Oseemeemow; Annabelle Sandfly; Ryan Sandfly

Tribal Council
- Yawpowitik

Website
- Wikipedia

Big Island Lake Cree Nation (Cree: ᒥᐢᑎᑯᐢᑳᐤ ᓵᑲᐦᐃᑲᐣ, romanized: mistikoskâw-sâkahikan, lit. 'many-trees lake') is a Cree First Nation in Saskatchewan, Canada. They have one reserve, also called Big Island Lake Cree Nation, within Rural Municipality of Beaver River No. 622.

== History ==
On June 25, 1913, Chief Joseph Bighead, representing Big Island Lake Cree Nation, also known as Lac Des Isles, signed an adhesion to Treaty 6. Indian Agents got into the habit of referring to Big Island Lake as Joseph Bighead’s Band. The name stuck until 2000 when Indian Affairs was reminded to call the Band Big Island Lake Band by its original name of Big Island Lake Cree Nation and its Territory as signed at Treaty Adhesion. Chief Joseph Bighead – Atinistikwan chose not to follow anyone. He and his Band remained independent of any Tribal Council or Federation, in the belief that membership serves to diminish Treaty Rights.
