= Saskatchewan Highway 919 =

Provincial highway in Saskatchewan, Canada

Highway 919

Route information
- Maintained by Ministry of Highways and Infrastructure
- Length: 46 km (29 mi)

Major junctions
- South end: Highway 21 / Highway 950 in Meadow Lake Provincial Park
- North end: Cold Lake Air Weapons Range

Location
- Country: Canada
- Province: Saskatchewan

Highway system
- Provincial highways in Saskatchewan
← Highway 918	→ Highway 920

Highway 919 is a provincial highway in the north-west region of the Canadian province of Saskatchewan. It runs from Highway 21 / Highway 950 to a dead end on the Cold Lake Air Weapons Range. It is about 46 kilometres (29 mi) long.

About two-thirds of Highway 919 lies within the Meadow Lake Provincial Park and several recreational areas, three lakes (Pierce, Hirtz, and Cold), and campgrounds are accessible from this portion of the highway.

== See also ==
- Roads in Saskatchewan
- Transportation in Saskatchewan
