= Primrose Lake =

Lake in western Canada

- Location of Primrose Lake Primrose Lake (Canada)
- Location: Northern Administration District, Saskatchewan / Lac La Biche County, Alberta
- Coordinates: 54°55′N 109°45′W
- Part of: Churchill River drainage basin
- Primary inflows: Calder River
- Primary outflows: Martineau River
- Basin countries: Canada
- Surface area: 444 km^{2} (171 sq mi)
- Surface elevation: 594 m (1,949 ft)
- Islands: Shinnan Island; Backes Island; Baker Island; Bailey Island; Beaconsfield Island; Disraeli Island

Primrose Lake is a large lake in the Canadian provinces of Saskatchewan and Alberta in the Churchill River drainage basin. The lake straddles the Saskatchewan–Alberta border, with most of the water surface in Saskatchewan with only the south-west corner of the lake in Alberta. On the Saskatchewan side of the lake is Backes Island Wildlife Refuge, which is a small protected island near the middle of the lake that is important to birds. The entire lake plus surrounding land totalling 1,259.52 km^{2} (486.30 sq mi) is part of an Important Bird Area (IBA) of Canada.

== Description ==
Primrose Lake has a total surface area of 444 km^{2} (171 sq mi), 17.7 km^{2} (6.8 sq mi) of which is in Alberta, and an elevation of 559 metres (1,834 ft). It lies within muskeg and the boreal forest ecozone of Canada. There are several rivers and creeks that flow into the lake with Calder River on the northern shore being the primary inflow. Martineau River is the lake's outflow and it starts on the southern shore and flows in a south-westerly direction into Cold Lake in Alberta. To the east of the lake are the Mostoos Hills. Besides the aforementioned Martineau River and Cold Lake, the waters of Primrose Lake flow through multiple rivers and lakes en route to the Churchill River, including Cold River, Pierce Lake, Lepine Lake, Lac des Îles, Waterhen River, Waterhen Lake, Beaver River, and Lac Île-à-la-Crosse.

== Primrose Lake IBA ==
The Primrose Lake (SK 092) IBA encompasses the entire lake and much of the surrounding landscape. Most of the IBA is in Saskatchewan but the western boundary is in Alberta. The lake is surrounded by boreal forests and has a sub-arctic climate. There are several islands in the lake that support colonial nesting birds with Backes Island (54.9583°N 109.7073°W) being the most prominent. Backes Island has been designated a provincial wildlife refuge. Birds found on the island and elsewhere in the IBA include the American white pelican, double-crested cormorant, common tern, California gull, great blue heron, ring-billed gull, and the herring gull.

== Launch Site ==
The south-west corner of Primrose Lake (54°45′N 110°03′W) in Alberta was used as launch site for sounding rockets of the types super Loki and Arcas in Canada. The first launch was on 5 April 1968 and the last one was 11 September 1991.

== Fish species ==
The fish species include walleye, sauger, yellow perch, northern pike, lake trout, lake whitefish, cisco, white sucker, longnose sucker, and burbot.

== See also ==
- List of lakes of Saskatchewan
- List of lakes of Alberta
