= Lepine Lake =

Lake in Saskatchewan, Canada

- Location in Saskatchewan Lepine Lake (Canada)
- Location: Meadow Lake Provincial Park, Saskatchewan
- Coordinates: 54.4786°N 109.6093°W
- Part of: Churchill River drainage basin
- Primary inflows: Cold River
- Primary outflows: Cold River
- Basin countries: Canada
- Surface area: 29.2 ha (72 acres)
- Max. depth: 11.3 m (37 ft)
- Surface elevation: 509 m (1,670 ft)
- Settlements: None

Lepine Lake is a small lake mostly within Meadow Lake Provincial Park along the course of the Cold River. A section of the south-eastern shore forms part of the border of Big Island Lake Cree Territory Indian reserve. Upstream from Lepine Lake is Pierce Lake while downstream is Lac des Îles. It is about 86 kilometres (53 mi) west-northwest of the city of Meadow Lake.

Access to the lake is from River Road in the Indian reserve at the lake's eastern end. Highway 950 runs along the northern shore of Lepine Lake and crosses the Cold River at the western end of the lake.

== Fish species ==
Fish commonly found Lepine Lake include walleye, northern pike, cisco, white sucker, longnose sucker, lake whitefish, and yellow perch.

== See also ==
- List of lakes of Saskatchewan
