= Ethel Lake (Alberta) =

Lake in Alberta, Canada

- Location within Alberta Location within Canada
- Location: Bonnyville No. 87, Alberta
- Coordinates: 54°31′55″N 110°21′04″W
- Part of: Churchill River drainage basin
- Primary inflows: Marie Creek
- Primary outflows: Marie Creek
- Basin countries: Canada
- Max. length: 2.8 km (1.7 mi)
- Max. width: 1.5 km (0.93 mi)
- Surface area: 4.90 km^{2} (1.89 sq mi)
- Average depth: 6.6 m (22 ft)
- Max. depth: 30 m (98 ft)
- Water volume: 32,200,000 m^{3} (1.14×10^{9} cu ft)
- Residence time: 2.5 years
- Shore length^{1}: 11 km (6.8 mi)
- Surface elevation: 541 m (1,775 ft)
- ^{1} Shore length is not a well-defined measure.

Ethel Lake is a small lake in Alberta, Canada. It is located west of Cold Lake.

== See also ==
- List of lakes of Alberta
