= Curtis Hargrove =

German-born Canadian long-distance charity runner and fundraiser

- Born: Curtis Jay Hargrove; March 27, 1989 (age 37); Lahr, West Germany
- Other name: The Cold Lake Runner
- Known for: Charity marathon running

Curtis Hargrove (born March 27, 1989) is a German-born Canadian long-distance charity runner and fundraiser. He ran from Port Alberni, British Columbia, to Burbank, California to raise awareness for the work of Angel Magnussen in 2015. He walked from Cold Lake, Alberta to the provincial capital of Edmonton in 2013 for YWCA Edmonton's Walk a Mile in Her Shoes event. He ran across Canada to raise money for the Stollery Children's Hospital Foundation in 2012-2013. In 2007, he ran across the provinces of British Columbia and Alberta to raise funds for the Terry Fox Foundation. He has been raising money through endurance since he was 15 years old. With his family in his home community of Cold Lake, he coordinated a 24-hour floor hockey tournament raise money for Sandra Shipclark, a woman with cerebral palsy, to get a new, up-to-date communication device in 2005.

== Personal life ==
Hargrove, born in Germany, moved to Cold Lake, Alberta with his family when he was less than a year old. He was 24 years old at the time of his cross-Canada run. He has been involved in marathon running for several years, winning the 2004 Centennial Marathon in Edmonton, Alberta. The course was 42 kilometers which he completed in three hours, fifty-seven minutes, and forty-two seconds.

== 2007 run ==
In 2007, when he was 18 years old, Hargrove raised $50,000 when he ran across British Columbia and Alberta for the Terry Fox Foundation.

== 2013 Walk a Mile ==
Curtis walked 185 miles from Cold Lake to Edmonton in women's high heels as part of the YWCA Edmonton's Walk a Mile in Her Shoes event.

== 2012 cross-Canada run ==
The "Curtis Hargrove's Run Across Canada for Cancer" began May 4, 2012, on the east coast of Newfoundland at St. John's, with Hargrove expecting to arrive in Victoria, British Columbia sometime between October 24 and November 4, 2012. He was able to cover approximately 50 kilometres each day. Hargrove was attempting to raise a million dollars for the Stollery Children's Hospital Foundation for cancer research. The foundation was part of the Stollery Children's Hospital in Edmonton. As of July 4, 2012, he has raised approximately $14,000.

=== Arrest ===
Hargrove was arrested by the Sûreté du Québec for "willfully obstructing an officer" near Saint-Nicolas, Quebec for running on the Trans-Canada Highway. His accompanying recreational vehicle driver, Morgan Seward, was fined 52 dollars. The charge of obstruction of justice resulted from Hargrove's refusal to get off the highway. After his arrest, a number of teenagers vandalized the recreational vehicle and stole a Canadian flag. The incident did not appear to be related to the arrest.

Morgan Seward added the following update to Hargrove's "RunCurtisRun" Facebook page:

Hi everyone! Morgan here! Curtis usually makes these updates, but he can't right now as he has been arrested. The officer arrested him and gave me a ticket. Apparently I wasn't allowed to be parked on the side of the road, which is why I have a ticket! Curtis was arrested because the officer told him he had a choice - stop running or get arrested. If anyone has any contacts with media, contact them. Who knew that doing some charity work was a crime? We didn't!

— Morgan Seward

Hargrove was scheduled to appear in court on September 21, and hoped to have that date delayed until his run was completed. At the homecoming in Cold Lake on that same date, it was announced that the charges had been dropped. He then used Quebec Route 132, which runs parallel to the Trans-Canada Highway. When he entered Ontario he continued to run on the Trans-Canada.

=== Growth of a beard ===
Hargrove started growing a beard when he began his run in Newfoundland because the kids at the Stollery suggested he should grow a beard like the Tom Hanks character, Forrest Gump. His full beard and overgrown mop of hair became an identifying characteristic. Some children donned a large fake beard for Curtis Hargrove costumes for Halloween. His enthusiasm for the beard was not shared by all of his followers, who often sent messages telling him to shave it. He always reminded them why he was growing it: for the kids.

=== Theme days ===
Hargrove has dressed in costume on particular days per the request of the children he is running for. He has run in a sumo suit, a Winnie the Poo costume, and a tutu. In the Fall, he ran as Austin Powers, Master Chief (of the HALO Xbox game), and as a cow.

=== Illness ===
Hargrove has been hospitalized twice as a result of the physical toll of running daily marathons for his Run Across Canada. First after passing Brandon, Manitoba, in September. Then again after reaching Red Deer, Alberta, in November.

=== Scotiabank Gamechangers ===
Hargrove was one of 8 champions of regional charities across Canada to be selected, after a process of online voting and deliberation by a panel of judges, to be presented on the field at the 2012 Grey Cup. The $100,000 National Gamechanger prize went to Angel Magnussen for Variety The Children's Charity of BC. Angel was the Gamechanger for the BC Lions.

=== Honours ===
On August 5, 2012, he was presented with a City of Thunder Bay medal by Councillor Mark Bentz.

On January 16, 2013, he received the Queen Elizabeth II Diamond Jubilee Medal at a ceremony in Lac La Biche, Alberta.

=== November 27, 2012: The Run Across Canada is put on hold ===
While recovering from his second bout of illness (vomiting blood), and after having broken off to attend the 100th Grey Cup as one of the Scotiabank Game Changers, Hargrove announced he would be putting the run on hold until the Spring of 2013. He was not stopping the run, but could not continue due to the drastic winter weather conditions. His RV was not adaptable to the extreme cold. He said in his announcement to his Facebook followers that his decision was not due to his health problems, but the number of accidents he was seeing on the road. He also reminded them that more fundraising and events would be coming up over this winter break, to help reach the goal of raising 1 million dollars for the Stollery Children's Hospital Foundation.

=== July, 2013: Finishing the Run Across Canada ===
Hargrove plans to finish the run from where he left off, after running in the "Color Me Rad" 5K being held July 6 through 7th. Morgan Seward is expected to rejoin him as his support team driver.

=== August 9, 2013 ===
Curtis Hargrove finished his run across Canada at Mile 0, in Victoria, British Columbia.

== Run to deliver a blanket to Ellen DeGeneres ==
On August 30, 2015, Hargrove embarked on a 2,440-km run from Port Alberni, BC to The Ellen DeGeneres Studio in Burbank, California with the intention of delivering a Hugginz by Angel blanket to DeGeneres. The company Hugginz by Angel is a non-profit belonging to Hargrove's friend Angel Magnussen, a 19-year-old with down syndrome and autism. Magnussen creates the blankets for children with terminal illness. Her wish was for DeGeneres to visit her Port Alberni studio in so she could help her sew blankets for sick children.

On October 18, 2015, after 50 days of running, Hargrove reached the Burbank studio but Ellen was not there. Although he was able to contact Ellen's production team, he was told that all they (he and his support driver) could do was leave gifts in a pile by the back gate. Although he was disappointed, he was not discouraged. Hargrove decided to keep the blanket, and bring it home with him "where he could continue to share it with people and spread the Magnussen's story until it eventually catches DeGeneres' attention."

== Multi-media ==
=== Facebook video blogs ===
Hargrove has maintained a connection with his supporters through regular text updates and video uploads These are normally recorded just as he ends his running for the day. He may often be shown running up to the camera, tired out and talking about how the run went. His usual videographer has been Morgan Seward, his driver.

=== The "Run With It" comic strips ===
Curtis Hargrove has been featured in a series of comic strips created by one of the followers of his story.

== See also ==
- Terry Fox

Further digital resources:

Article about his arrest in Quebec (just like his hero Terry Fox) https://nationalpost.com/news/canada/curtis-hargrove-arrest

Article about his 185 mile walk from Cold Lake to Edmonton https://web.archive.org/web/20160913195720/http://www.ywcaofedmonton.org/blog/curtis-hargrove-walking-mile-or-rather-185-miles-her-shoes

CTV article about his Hugginz HWY effort https://www.ctvnews.ca/entertainment/article/man-runs-from-bc-to-california-to-hand-deliver-blanket-to-ellen-degeneres/

Runners World Article about the Hugginz HWY effort http://www.runnersworld.com/general-interest/ultra-run-to-ellen-degeneres-ends-at-studio-lot

Lakeland Connect article about his visit and talk with schoolkids at the "Me to We" event https://lakelandconnect.net/2016/03/03/curtis-hargrove-inspires-kids-at-dr-b-for-me-to-we-day/

Video Links:

An interview with Curtis when he was 23, running across Canada https://www.youtube.com/watch?v=OmvQxuo1oxY

A Montage of videos put together at about the middle of Curtis' run across Canada: https://www.youtube.com/watch?v=N7kyWqnx1PA
