= Johnston Lake =

Lake in Saskatchewan, Canada

- Location in Saskatchewan Johnston Lake (Canada)
- Location: Meadow Lake Provincial Park, Saskatchewan
- Coordinates: 54.4740°N 109.3911°W
- Etymology: Robert Alexander Johnston
- Part of: Churchill River drainage basin
- Primary inflows: Bear Creek
- River sources: Mostoos Hills
- Primary outflows: Bear Creek
- Basin countries: Canada
- Surface area: 93.1 ha (230 acres)
- Max. depth: 12.8 m (42 ft)
- Shore length^{1}: 6 km (3.7 mi)
- Surface elevation: 502 m (1,647 ft)
- ^{1} Shore length is not a well-defined measure.

Johnston Lake is a lake in the Canadian province of Saskatchewan. It is just north of Lac des Îles in Meadow Lake Provincial Park. There is a boat launch for boating and fishing at the eastern end. Access is from Highway 950. The lake was named after Robert Alexander Johnston who died in Italy durung World War II.

Besides the boat launch, there are no facilities at the lake. Murray Doell Campground, which is on Lac des Îles, is on the opposite side of Highway 950 and can be accessed by road from Johnston Lake.

Johnston Lake is along the course of Bear Creek, which originates to the north in the Mostoos Hills. Bear Creek enters the lake at the western end and exits from the southern shore flowing south into Lac des Îles.

== Fish species ==
Fish species commonly found in Johnston Lake include northern pike, yellow perch, and walleye. In years past, it was stocked regularly with walleye but has not been since 2019.

== See also ==
- List of lakes of Saskatchewan
