= Pierce Lake (Saskatchewan) =

Lake in Saskatchewan, Canada

- Location in Saskatchewan Pierce Lake (Canada)
- Location: Meadow Lake Provincial Park, Saskatchewan
- Coordinates: 54.5001°N 109.7008°W
- Part of: Churchill River drainage basin
- Primary inflows: Cold River
- Primary outflows: Cold River
- Basin countries: Canada
- Surface area: 2,599.2 ha (6,423 acres)
- Max. depth: 46.4 m (152 ft)
- Shore length^{1}: 65.5 km (40.7 mi)
- Surface elevation: 500 m (1,600 ft)
- Settlements: None
- ^{1} Shore length is not a well-defined measure.

Pierce Lake is a lake in Meadow Lake Provincial Park in the Canadian Province of Saskatchewan. It is situated along the course of the Cold River in the boreal forest ecozone of Canada. Upstream along Cold River from Pierce Lake is Cold Lake and downstream are Lepine Lake and Lac des Îles. Pierce Lake and Cold River are in the Beaver River watershed, which is part of the Churchill River and Hudson Bay drainage basin.

Highway 21 heads north up from Highway 55 to provide access to Pierce Lake near Howe Bay at the eastern end and Meadow Lake Provincial Park. Howe Bay is the location of Pierce Lake Lodge and the convergence of Highways 950 and 919. Highway 919 heads west to Cold Lake along the southern shore of Pierce Lake and 950 heads north crossing Cold River then east along Lepine Lake's northern shore en route to Lac des Îles.

== Recreation ==
Being in a provincial park, there are many recreational opportunities at Pierce Lake, including boating, camping, fishing, and swimming.

Pierce Lake Lodge is located at the south-east corner of the lake at Howe Bay. The lodge offers 55 campsites, cabin rentals, beach access, docks, and boat rentals. The lodge can be accessed from Highway 950 and is at the 24-kilometre marker of the Boreal Trail.

Along the southern shore of the lake is Sandy Beach Campground. The campground features 83 individual sites, some with electrical hooks and others unserviced, and multiple group sites. Washrooms, showers, a store, a sani-dump, and potable water are available at the campground. As the name suggests, there's a sandy beach for swimming and other activities. There is a playground, concession stand, picnic area, and a boat launch at the beach. The beach and campground are accessed from Highway 919.

== Fish species ==
Fish in the lake include lake trout, northern pike, and walleye. Sport fishing in the summer and winter are popular activities on the lake.

== See also ==
- List of lakes of Saskatchewan
- Tourism in Saskatchewan
