= Saskatchewan Highway 950 =

Provincial highway in Saskatchewan, Canada

Highway 950

Route information
- Maintained by Ministry of Highways and Infrastructure
- Length: 35 km (22 mi)

Major junctions
- West end: Highway 21 / Highway 919 in Meadow Lake Provincial Park
- East end: Highway 26 / Highway 224 in Meadow Lake Provincial Park

Location
- Country: Canada
- Province: Saskatchewan

Highway system
- Provincial highways in Saskatchewan
← Highway 946	→ Highway 951

Highway 950 is a provincial highway in the northwest region of Saskatchewan, Canada. It runs from Highway 21 / Highway 919 to Highway 26 / Highway 224. It is about 35 kilometres (22 mi) long.

Highway 950 lies entirely inside the Meadow Lake Provincial Park. For much of its length, it runs along the northern shores of the Lac des Îles and Lepine Lake. The western terminus is at Pierce Lake. Recreational areas accessed from the highway Murray Doell Campground, Pierce Lake Lodge, and the boat launch at Johnston Lake.

== See also ==
- Roads in Saskatchewan
- Transportation in Saskatchewan
