= Cold Lake 149 =

Indian reserve in Alberta, Canada

Coordinates: 54°17′49″N 110°17′35″W

- Indigenous reserve
- Cold Lake Indigenous Reserve No. 149
- Location in Alberta
- First Nation: Cold Lake
- Treaty: 6
- Country: Canada
- Province: Alberta
- Municipal district: Bonnyville

Area
  - Total: 14,528.1 ha (35,900 acres)

Population (2016)
  - Total: 671
  - Density: 4.62/km^{2} (12.0/sq mi)
- Time zone: UTC−06:00 (Alberta Time)

Cold Lake 149 is an Indian reserve of the Cold Lake First Nations in Alberta, located within the Municipal District of Bonnyville No. 87. It is 26 kilometres east of Bonnyville. In the 2016 Canadian Census, it recorded a population of 671 living in 208 of its 222 total private dwellings.
