= Cold Lake, Alberta =

City in Alberta, Canada

Cold Lake
- City
- City of Cold Lake
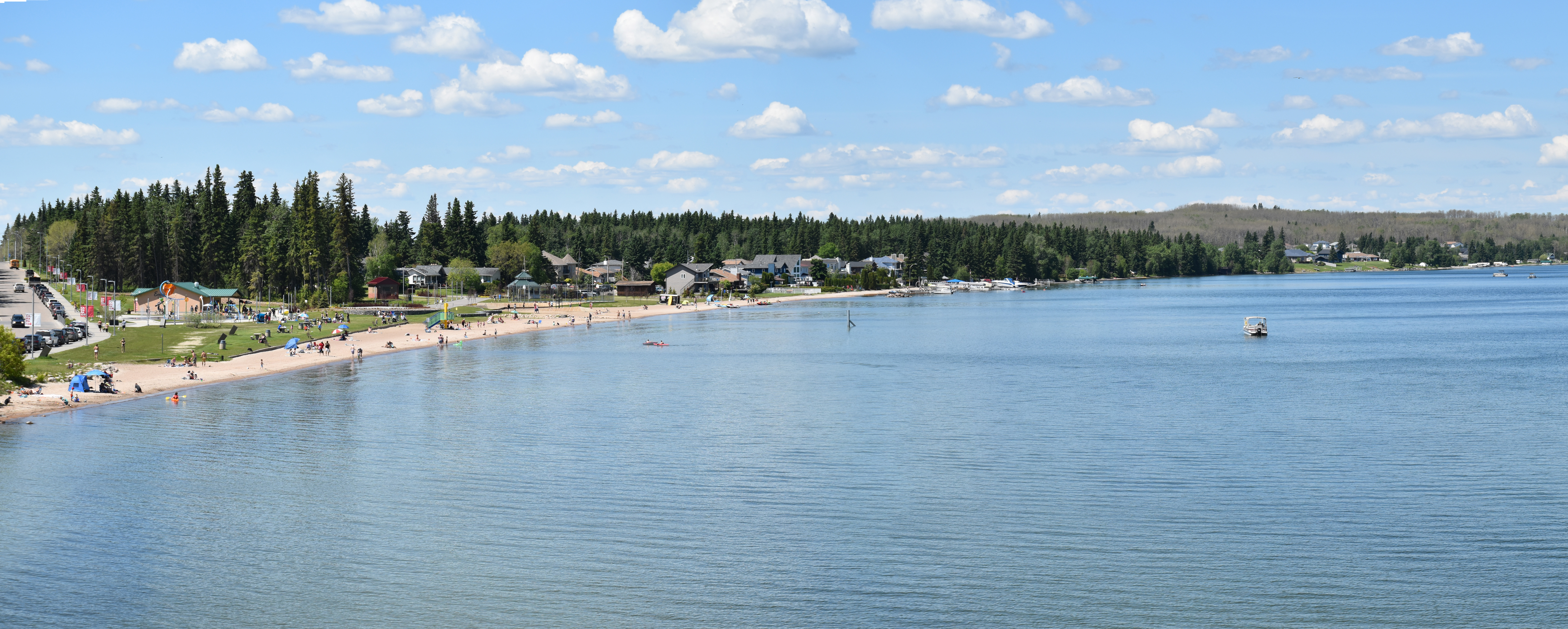
- Kinosoo Beach

- Logo

- Location within Alberta Location within MD of Bonnyville
- Coordinates: 54°27′N 110°10′W
- Country: Canada
- Province: Alberta
- Region: Northern Alberta
- Planning region: Lower Athabasca
- Founded: ca. 1877 (HBC post)
- Incorporated
  - Village: December 31, 1953
  - Town: July 2, 1955
  - City: October 1, 2000
- Amalgamated: October 1, 1996

Government
  - Mayor: Bob Mattice
  - Governing body: Cold Lake City Council: Bob Buckle; Jurgen Grau; Duane Lay; Victoria Lefebvre; Kirk Soroka; Chris Vining
  - CAO: Kevin Nagoya
  - MP: Laila Goodridge
  - MLA: Scott Cyr

Area (2021)
  - Land: 66.61 km^{2} (25.72 sq mi)
- Elevation: 540 m (1,770 ft)

Population (2021)
  - Total: 15,661
  - Density: 235.1/km^{2} (609/sq mi)
  - Municipal census (2022): 16,302
- Time zone: UTC−06:00 (Alberta Time)
- Postal code span: T9M
- Area codes: 780, 587, 825, 368
- Highways: Highway 28; Highway 55
- Waterways: Beaver River; Cold Lake
- Website: www.coldlake.com

Cold Lake is a city in north-east Alberta, Canada, and is named after the lake nearby. Canadian Forces Base Cold Lake (CFB Cold Lake) is situated within the city's outer limits.

== History ==
Cold Lake was first recorded on a 1790 map, by the name of Coldwater Lake.

Around 1877, the Hudson's Bay Company (HBC) established a fur trade post at Cold Lake, to trade with the Chipewyans from the Cold Lake First Nation. First serving as an outpost of the Onion Lake post, it became a full post in 1915 and got its own outpost at Le Goff (in Cold Lake 149 reserve) in November 1930. The post closed in 1937.

Originally three communities, Cold Lake was formed by merging the Town of Grand Centre, the Town of Cold Lake, and Medley (CFB Cold Lake) on October 1, 1996. Grand Centre was renamed Cold Lake South, and the original Cold Lake is known as Cold Lake North. Because of its origins, the area is also known as the Tri-Town.

== Fossil record ==
Cold Lake preserves an extensive fossil and subfossil record from the Pleistocene after the Last Glacial Maximum to the Late Holocene. By the Middle Holocene, the mammalian biota in the region was essentially modern.

== Geography ==
The city is situated in Alberta's "Lakeland" district, 300 km (190 mi) northeast of Edmonton, near the Alberta-Saskatchewan provincial border. The area surrounding the city is sparsely populated, and consists mostly of farmland. It is almost entirely surrounded by but not part of Municipal District of Bonnyville No. 87.

Nearby are the First Nation reserves of Cold Lake 149, Cold Lake 149A, and Cold Lake 149B.

=== Climate ===
Cold Lake's climate is humid continental (Köppen climate classification Dfb). Summers are generally warm with cool nights, and winters are very cold with moderate snowfall.

The record high temperature was 36.3 °C (97.3 °F) recorded June 27, 2002. The record high daily minimum was 23.1 °C (73.6 °F) recorded July 2, 2021. The record highest dew point was 23.9 °C (75.0 °F) recorded July 18, 1955. The most humid month was July 2024 with an average dew point of 13.7 °C (56.7 °F). The warmest month was July 2007 with an average mean temperature of 20.9 °C (69.6 °F) and the highest average monthly daily minimum of 14.4 °C (57.9 °F). August 1991 recorded the highest average monthly daily maximum of 27.0 °C (80.6 °F). July 2014 set a record of no maximum temperature below 20.7 °C (69.3 °F) for the entire month; July 2006 with no temperature below 9.6 °C (49.3 °F), and July 1994 with no dew point below 6.8 °C (44.2 °F).

The lowest yearly maximum dew point is 16.3 °C (61.3 °F) recorded in 1980. The lowest yearly maximum daily minimum temperature is 14.1 °C (57.4 °F) recorded in 1992. The lowest yearly maximum temperature is 28.5 °C (83.3 °F) recorded in 2010.

The average yearly maximum dew point is 18.6 °C (65.5 °F) and the average yearly maximum daily minimum temperature is 17.2 °C (63.0 °F).

Cold Lake

Climate chart (precipitation, max. and min. temperature)
J	F	M	A	M	J	J	A	S	O	N	D
17 −10 −20	13 −6 −17	18 1 −11	34 9 −2	40 17 4	86 21 9	79 24 12	52 23 10	39 17 5	24 8 −1	19 −2 −10	16 −9 −17
- █ Average max. and min. temperatures in °C
- █ Precipitation totals in mm
- Source: Environment Canada
Imperial conversion
J	F	M	A	M	J	J	A	S	O	N	D
0.7 14 −3	0.5 21 1	0.7 33 13	1.3 49 28	1.6 63 39	3.4 70 49	3.1 74 53	2.1 73 51	1.5 62 41	0.9 47 30	0.8 29 14	0.6 16 1
- █ Average max. and min. temperatures in °F
- █ Precipitation totals in inches

Climate data for Cold Lake Regional Airport, Alberta (1991–2020 normals, extremes 1952–present)
Month	Jan	Feb	Mar	Apr	May	Jun	Jul	Aug	Sep	Oct	Nov	Dec	Year
Record high humidex	10.6	12.1	17.1	28.7	33.8	38.0	43.2	39.0	34.0	27.7	18.3	10.0	43.2
Record high °C (°F)	10.6 (51.1)	14.1 (57.4)	17.9 (64.2)	29.4 (84.9)	32.5 (90.5)	36.3 (97.3)	36.1 (97.0)	36.1 (97.0)	33.1 (91.6)	27.4 (81.3)	18.9 (66.0)	10.1 (50.2)	36.3 (97.3)
Mean maximum °C (°F)	5.2 (41.4)	6.2 (43.2)	11.6 (52.9)	21.1 (70.0)	27.4 (81.3)	28.5 (83.3)	30.4 (86.7)	30.5 (86.9)	26.1 (79.0)	19.8 (67.6)	8.8 (47.8)	3.5 (38.3)	31.9 (89.4)
Mean daily maximum °C (°F)	−9.9 (14.2)	−6.3 (20.7)	0.5 (32.9)	9.4 (48.9)	17.1 (62.8)	21.0 (69.8)	23.6 (74.5)	22.5 (72.5)	16.9 (62.4)	8.4 (47.1)	−1.9 (28.6)	−8.7 (16.3)	7.7 (45.9)
Daily mean °C (°F)	−14.8 (5.4)	−11.8 (10.8)	−5.1 (22.8)	3.6 (38.5)	10.6 (51.1)	15.1 (59.2)	17.7 (63.9)	16.4 (61.5)	10.9 (51.6)	3.6 (38.5)	−5.9 (21.4)	−13.1 (8.4)	2.3 (36.1)
Mean daily minimum °C (°F)	−19.6 (−3.3)	−17.3 (0.9)	−10.7 (12.7)	−2.2 (28.0)	4.1 (39.4)	9.2 (48.6)	11.8 (53.2)	10.3 (50.5)	4.9 (40.8)	−1.3 (29.7)	−9.8 (14.4)	−17.4 (0.7)	−3.2 (26.2)
Mean minimum °C (°F)	−35.2 (−31.4)	−30.8 (−23.4)	−26.8 (−16.2)	−12.1 (10.2)	−3.7 (25.3)	2.5 (36.5)	6.1 (43.0)	3.3 (37.9)	−3.0 (26.6)	−10.1 (13.8)	−21.2 (−6.2)	−31.1 (−24.0)	−37.7 (−35.9)
Record low °C (°F)	−48.3 (−54.9)	−42.8 (−45.0)	−41.1 (−42.0)	−34.4 (−29.9)	−9.9 (14.2)	−3.3 (26.1)	0.0 (32.0)	−1.5 (29.3)	−9.4 (15.1)	−23.5 (−10.3)	−36.7 (−34.1)	−44.4 (−47.9)	−48.3 (−54.9)
Record low wind chill	−53.3	−55.4	−49.3	−37.2	−14.7	−6.7	0.0	−6.0	−14.9	−29.0	−48.5	−52.6	−55.4
Average precipitation mm (inches)	17.4 (0.69)	12.6 (0.50)	17.8 (0.70)	33.9 (1.33)	39.9 (1.57)	85.5 (3.37)	79.4 (3.13)	52.3 (2.06)	38.8 (1.53)	23.7 (0.93)	19.2 (0.76)	16.0 (0.63)	436.5 (17.2)
Average rainfall mm (inches)	0.7 (0.03)	0.2 (0.01)	2.6 (0.10)	20.1 (0.79)	38.1 (1.50)	85.4 (3.36)	79.4 (3.13)	52.1 (2.05)	38.6 (1.52)	15.1 (0.59)	1.6 (0.06)	0.4 (0.02)	334.3 (13.16)
Average snowfall cm (inches)	23.4 (9.2)	16.5 (6.5)	18.0 (7.1)	14.3 (5.6)	2.0 (0.8)	0.1 (0.0)	0.0 (0.0)	0.1 (0.0)	0.3 (0.1)	7.8 (3.1)	22.6 (8.9)	21.9 (8.6)	127 (49.9)
Average precipitation days (≥ 0.2 mm)	10.5	7.6	7.6	8.1	9.4	13.2	14.0	11.9	10.1	9.0	9.1	9.7	120.2
Average rainy days (≥ 0.2 mm)	0.9	0.23	1.4	5.2	9.0	13.2	14.0	11.9	10.0	6.2	1.3	0.47	73.8
Average snowy days (≥ 0.2 cm)	10.7	8.5	6.9	4.4	0.8	0.03	0.0	0.03	0.23	4.2	8.9	10.5	55.19
Average relative humidity (%)	69.8	62.0	53.8	45.7	40.4	49.5	51.6	50.7	51.1	55.9	69.8	73.4	56.1
Average dew point °C (°F)	−18.2 (−0.8)	−16.1 (3.0)	−10.8 (12.6)	−4.5 (23.9)	1.0 (33.8)	7.9 (46.2)	11.4 (52.5)	10.2 (50.4)	4.8 (40.6)	−2.0 (28.4)	−9.2 (15.4)	−16.1 (3.0)	−3.5 (25.7)
Mean monthly sunshine hours	87.1	118.2	172.3	221.6	260.0	265.2	283.0	279.9	176.9	140.9	82.2	68.3	2,155.5
Percentage possible sunshine	35.4	43.1	47.0	52.6	52.3	51.6	54.9	60.6	46.2	43.1	32.1	29.7	45.7
Source 1: Environment Canada
Source 2: weatherstats.ca (for dewpoint and monthly&yearly average absolute maximum&minimum temperature)

== Demographics ==
The population of the City of Cold Lake according to its 2022 municipal census is 16,302, a change of 3.6% from its 2014 municipal census population of 15,736.

In the 2021 Census of Population conducted by Statistics Canada, the City of Cold Lake had a population of 15,661 living in 6,114 of its 6,767 total private dwellings, a change of 4.6% from its 2016 population of 14,976. With a land area of 66.61 km^{2} (25.72 sq mi), it had a population density of 235.1/km^{2} (608.9/sq mi) in 2021.

In the Canada 2016 census conducted by Statistics Canada, the City of Cold Lake had a population of 14,961 living in 5,597 of its 6,657 total private dwellings, a change of 8.1% from its 2011 population of 13,839. With a land area of 59.92 km^{2} (23.14 sq mi), it had a population density of 249.7/km^{2} (646.7/sq mi) in 2016.

Federal census population history
(post-amalgamation)

Year	Pop.	±%
1996	11,791	—
2001	11,520	−2.3%
2006	11,991	+4.1%

Year	Pop.	±%
2011	13,839	+15.4%
2016	14,961	+8.1%
2021	15,661	+4.7%

The 1996 population is the adjusted population of the amalgamated City of Cold Lake formed on October 1, 1996.
Source: Statistics Canada

Federal census population history
(pre-amalgamation)

Year	Pop.	±%
1941	302	—
1951	414	+37.1%
1956	1,097	+165.0%
1961	1,307	+19.1%
1966	1,289	−1.4%

Year	Pop.	±%
1971	1,309	+1.6%
1976	1,317	+0.6%
1981	2,110	+60.2%
1986	3,195	+51.4%
1991	3,878	+21.4%

Year	Pop.	±%
1996	4,089	+5.4%
2001	4,676	+14.4%
2006	5,560	+18.9%
2011	6,455	+16.1%
2016	7,121	+10.3%

The 2001 population is of the former Town of Cold Lake that amalgamated with the Town of Grand Centre and Medley (CFB 4 Wing) on October 1, 1996.
Source: Statistics Canada

=== Ethnicity ===
Panethnic groups in the City of Cold Lake (2001−2021)
Panethnic group	2021		2016		2011		2006		2001	
Panethnic group	Pop.	%	Pop.	%	Pop.	%	Pop.	%	Pop.	%
European (Note: Statistic includes all persons that did not make up part of a visible minority or an indigenous identity.)	11,475	74.78%	11,665	79.76%	11,710	84.95%	10,575	88.46%	10,320	90.13%
Indigenous	2,330	15.18%	1,360	9.3%	1,330	9.65%	1,035	8.66%	850	7.42%
Southeast Asian (Note: Statistic includes total responses of "Filipino" and "Southeast Asian" under visible minority section on census.)	760	4.95%	625	4.27%	195	1.41%	30	0.25%	25	0.22%
South Asian	230	1.5%	185	1.26%	110	0.8%	55	0.46%	60	0.52%
African	205	1.34%	250	1.71%	120	0.87%	75	0.63%	50	0.44%
Middle Eastern (Note: Statistic includes total responses of "West Asian" and "Arab" under visible minority section on census.)	105	0.68%	90	0.62%	80	0.58%	70	0.59%	10	0.09%
Latin American	90	0.59%	100	0.68%	85	0.62%	10	0.08%	0	0%
East Asian (Note: Statistic includes total responses of "Chinese", "Korean", and "Japanese" under visible minority section on census.)	85	0.55%	255	1.74%	70	0.51%	85	0.71%	135	1.18%
Other/multiracial (Note: Statistic includes total responses of "Visible minority, n.i.e." and "Multiple visible minorities" under visible minority section on census.)	60	0.39%	110	0.75%	80	0.58%	40	0.33%	0	0%
Total responses	15,345	97.98%	14,625	97.66%	13,785	99.61%	11,955	99.7%	11,450	99.39%
Total population	15,661	100%	14,976	100%	13,839	100%	11,991	100%	11,520	100%
Note: Totals greater than 100% due to multiple origin responses

=== Language ===
Almost 89% of residents identified English and more than 7% identified French as their first language. Almost 1% identified German, 0.5% identified Chinese, 0.4% each identified Dutch and Ukrainian, and 0.3% each identified Cree and Arabic as their first language learned.

=== Religion ===
About 82 percent of residents identified as Christian at the time of the 2001 census, while more than 17 percent indicated they had no religious affiliation. For specific denominations Statistics Canada found that 40% of residents identified as Roman Catholic, 14% identified with the United Church of Canada, 5.5% identified as Anglican, 3% as Baptist, 2.5% as Lutheran, and 2% as Pentecostal.

== Economy ==
The city's economy is inextricably linked to military spending at CFB Cold Lake. The region also supports oil and gas exploration and production. The Athabasca Oil Sands project in Fort McMurray is having a growing influence in the region as well. The Cold Lake oil sands may become a significant contributor to the local economy.

A job market analysis from December 2024 to January 2025 showed that the Oil & Gas sector accounted for 33% of job postings in the region, with administrative roles and skilled trades also in high demand.

Every year Cold Lake hosts military forces from around the world for Exercise Maple Flag, a training exercise where pilots and support staff of NATO allies can take advantage of the Air Weapons Range and relatively open rural air space. Running from 4 to 6 weeks and starting in May of each year, commercial accommodations in the entire region are left with little to no vacancy. This annual exercise contributes a substantial amount of capital into these industries and other hospitality-related businesses.

== In popular culture ==
Cold Lake is the home of Marvel comic book character Wolverine.

== Sports ==
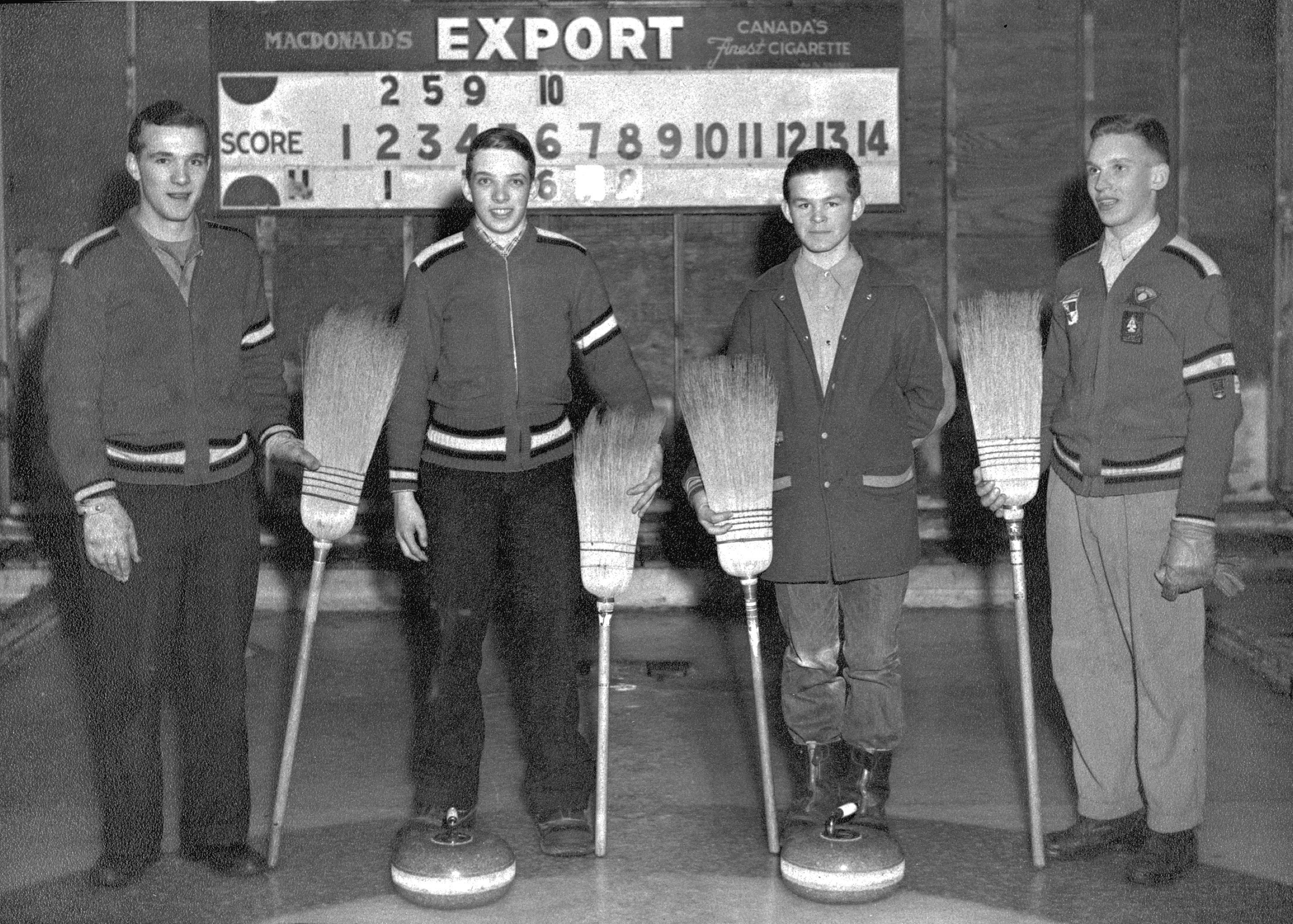
Cold Lake Curling Club School, 1955

Cold Lake has a variety of sports, including:

- Hockey (Home to the Cold Lake Ice, Junior B Team) & (Home to the Cold Lake Freeze, Minor Hockey Teams)
- Lacrosse (Home to the Cold Lake Heat, Minor Lacrosse Teams)
- Volleyball (Assumption and CLHS Royals)
- Football (CLHS Royals)
- Basketball (Assumption and CLHS Royals)
- Soccer (Indoor and outdoor-Cold Lake Minor Soccer)
- Baseball
- Rugby (Assumption Crusader's and CLHS Royals combined team and Cold Lake Penguins Men's RFC)
- Hapkido
- Tae Kwon Do (Hetlinger taekwondo, and occasionally International Taekwon-Do Federation or World Taekwondo Federation)
- Figure Skating (Cold Lake Figure Skating Club)
- Figure Skating (Norlight Skating Club)
- Downhill Skiing (Kinosoo Ridge Snow Resort)
- Dancing (Pirouette School of Dance with award-winning dance team, Fame Dance (Located at the Energy Centre)
- Mixed Martial Arts (Team Sparta)
- Roller Derby (Lakeland Ladykillers Roller Derby League)
- Swimming (Cold Lake Marlins Swim Club)
- Powerlifting (Cold Lake Bar Benders)
- Gymnastics (Lakeland Gymnastics Club)
- Disc Golf
- Pickleball
- Bowling (Marina Bowling Centre)

== Government ==
Mayors:

- Bob Mathis, 2025-present
- Craig Copeland, 2007–2025
- Allan Buck, 2004–2007
- Hansa Thaleshvar, 1998–2004
- Raymond Coates, 1996–1998

The last local election was held in October 2025. As of 2025, the councillors of Cold Lake are Chris Vining, Vicky Lefebvre, Dawn Weber, Ryan Bailey, Raymond Cowell and Bill Parker.

At the provincial level, the city is in the district of Bonnyville-Cold Lake-St. Paul. Its current representative is Scott Cyr, from the United Conservative Party.

At the federal level, the city is in the district of Fort McMurray—Cold Lake. Its current representative is Laila Goodridge, from the Conservative Party of Canada.

== Recreation ==
Cold Lake is situated near many campgrounds due to its proximity to the lake. The M.D. campground has powered sites, shower facilities with flush toilets, and a covered camp picnic area. The Cold Lake Provincial Park has many sites, and is more secluded than the M.D. site (which is surrounded by development). The Provincial campground boasts a wilderness trail system, a beach, boat launch and a powered section. Nearby Meadow Lake Provincial Park to the east, across the border in Saskatchewan, has facilities similar to Cold Lake Provincial Park.

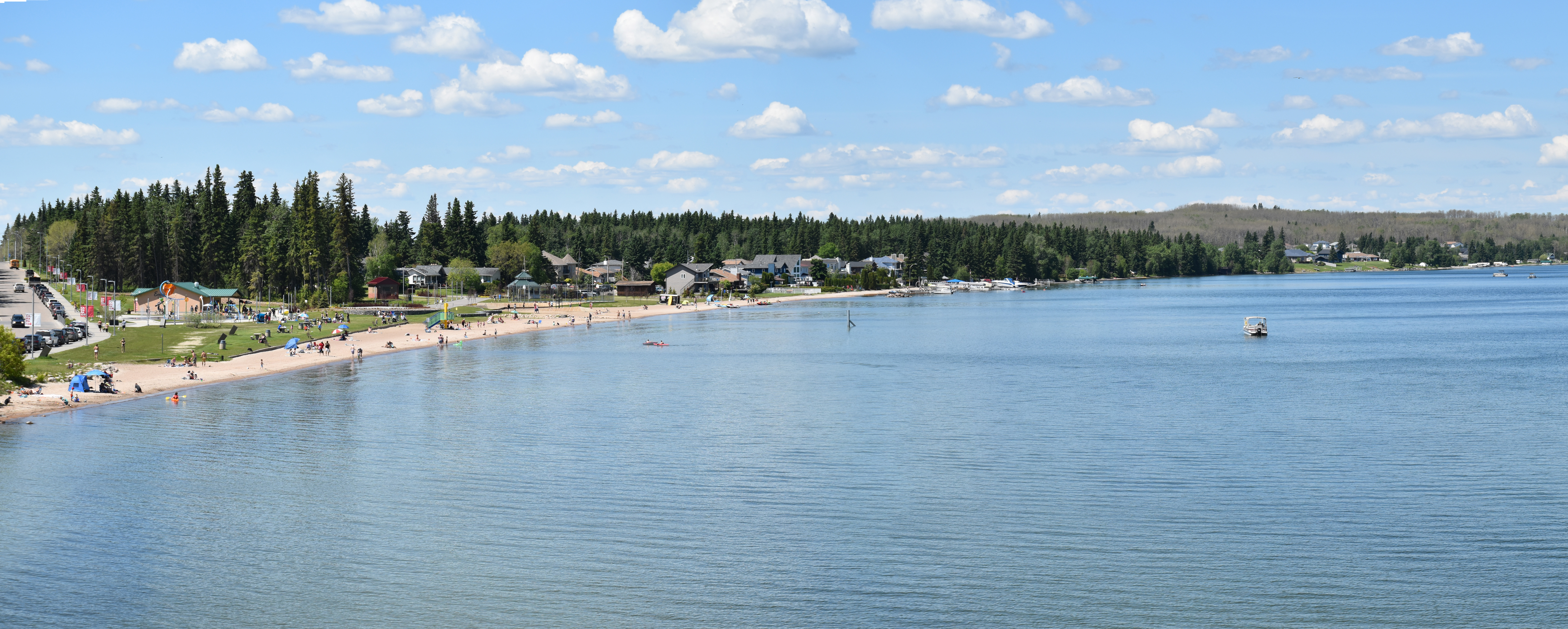
Kinosoo Beach in Cold Lake, Alberta

Kinosoo Beach is a favorite destination during the hot summer months between June and August.

The Iron Horse Trail, a recreational trail situated on a former railway line (see rail trail) has its easternmost terminus in Cold Lake.

Recreational pastimes include, among others:

- Hockey
- Box Lacrosse
- Geocaching
- Martial Arts
- Rugby
- Soccer
- Swimming
- Bowling
- Curling
- Gymnastics
- Golf
- Horseback Riding
- 4H (in Cherry Grove)
- Rodeo (Cold Lake Ag Society)
- Dance
- Sailing
- Boating
- scuba diving
- Fishing
- Downhill Skiing
- Roller Derby

== Museums ==
=== Air Force Museum ===
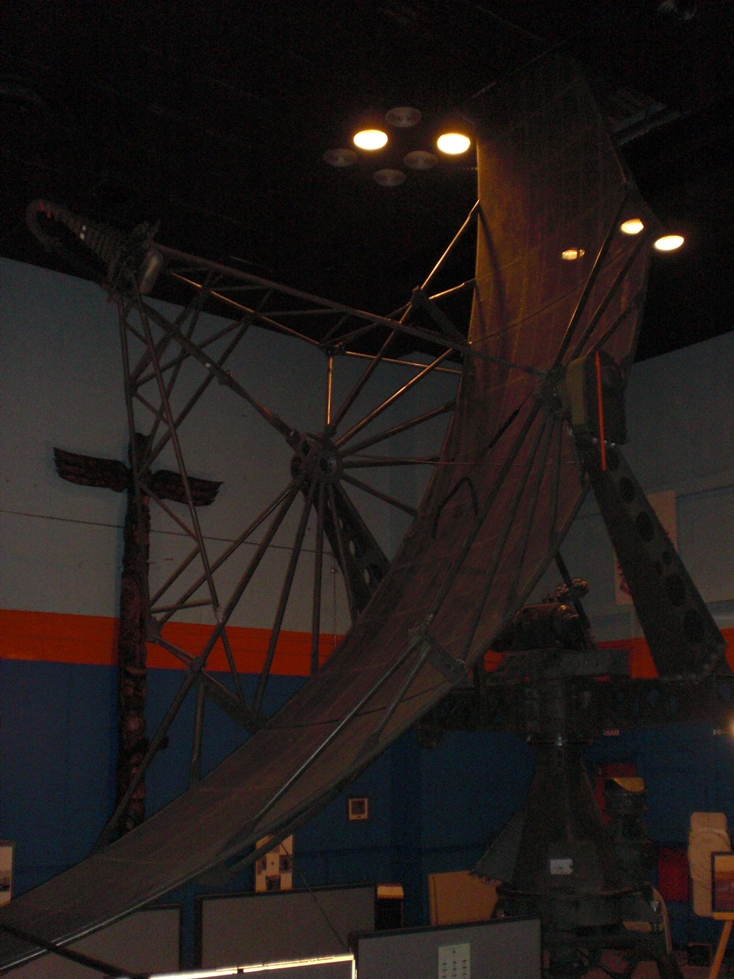
Height Finder Radar on Display in the 42 Radar Squadron exhibit

The Air Force Museum preserves and exhibits the history of CFB Cold Lake and of 42 Radar Squadron. 42 Radar was on this site from 1954 to 1992, so Cold War era technology is mostly on display in their exhibit. An example of this is the General Electric Height Finder Radar on display.

The Museum has much 4 Wing history on display. The current 4 Wing standing squadrons such as 409 Squadron, 410 Squadron, 419 Squadron, 1 Air Maintenance Squadron, Aerospace Engineering Test Establishment and others are displayed in the Museum. There are a few exhibits of purely historic nature, such as displays on 441 and 416, Squadrons which stood down in 2006 to be amalgamated into 409 Squadron.

The Museum also has four aircraft on display outside, including the CF-5 Freedom Fighter, CT-133 Silver Star, the CT-114 Tutor and the CT-134 Musketeer. The newest addition to the air park is a CF-188 Decoy.

=== Oil and Gas Museum ===
This exhibit was designed, researched and constructed by Grand Centre High School students. This museum explains the history of Oil and gas in the Cold Lake area from Paleolithic times to the present.

=== Heritage Museum ===
The Heritage Museum exhibits a time line of life in Cold Lake, both domestic and commercial. The museum also boasts some impressive murals.

=== Aboriginal Museum ===
The Aboriginal Museum displays the history of the Dene, Cree and Metis peoples in time lines, maps, crafts and cultural displays. There are also bears on display.

== Education ==
Portage College operates a campus at Cold Lake. Program offerings include academic upgrading, accounting, community social works, nursing, power engineering and university studies among others.

Lakeland Catholic School District No. 150 and Northern Lights School Division No. 69 operate public schools within Cold Lake. Cold Lake also hosts a Francophone school named École Voyageur that offers French programming for kindergarten through grade 12, as well as the Cold Lake Cadet Summer Training Centre.

Lakeland Catholic School District No. 150

- Holy Cross Elementary School (offering kindergarten through grade 6 programming)
- École St. Dominic School (offering pre-kindergarten through grade 6 English and French programming)
- Assumption Junior/Senior High School (offering grade 7 through grade 12 English and French programming)

Northern Lights School Division No. 69

- Cold Lake Elementary School (offering pre-kindergarten through grade 3 programming)
- Ecole North Star Elementary School (offering kindergarten through grade 3 English and French programming)
- Nelson Heights School (offering grade 4 through grade 6 programming)
- Cold Lake Junior High (offering grade 7 through grade 9)
- Cold Lake High School (offering grade 10 through grade 12 programming)
- Bridges Outreach School (offering grade 8 and grade 9 programming)
- Cold Lake Outreach School (offering grade 10 through grade 12 programming)

== Notable people ==
- Alex Auld, NHL goaltender
- Garry Howatt, NHL forward
- Alex Janvier, artist
- Bonnie McFarlane, comedian
- René Richard, artist
- Curtis Hargrove, charity runner

== See also ==
- List of francophone communities in Alberta
