= Cold Lake 149B =

Coordinates: 54°30′41″N 110°15′39″W

- Indian reserve
- Cold Lake Indian Reserve No. 149B
- Location in Alberta
- First Nation: Cold Lake
- Treaty: 6
- Country: Canada
- Province: Alberta
- Municipal district: Bonnyville

Area
  - Total: 4,134.0 ha (10,215 acres)

Population (2016)
  - Total: 163
  - Density: 3.94/km^{2} (10.2/sq mi)
- Time zone: UTC−06:00 (Alberta Time)

Cold Lake 149B is an Indian reserve of the Cold Lake First Nations in Alberta, located within the Municipal District of Bonnyville No. 87. It is south of the Beaver River, a short distance northwest of the city of Cold Lake.
