= Cold Lake 149A =

Coordinates: 54°27′32″N 110°09′18″W

- Indian reserve
- Cold Lake Indian Reserve No. 149A
- Location in Alberta
- First Nation: Cold Lake
- Treaty: 6
- Country: Canada
- Province: Alberta
- Municipal district: Bonnyville

Area
  - Total: 71.6 ha (177 acres)

Population (2016)
  - Total: 40
  - Density: 56/km^{2} (140/sq mi)
- Time zone: UTC−06:00 (Alberta Time)

Cold Lake 149A is an Indian reserve of the Cold Lake First Nations in Alberta, located within the Municipal District of Bonnyville No. 87. It is on the south shore of Cold Lake, immediately adjacent to the city of Cold Lake.
