= Lac des Îles (Saskatchewan) =

Lake in Saskatchewan, Canada

- Location in Saskatchewan Lac des Îles (Canada)
- Location: Meadow Lake Provincial Park, Saskatchewan
- Coordinates: 54.433425°N 109.417464°W
- Part of: Churchill River drainage basin
- Primary inflows: Cold River
- Primary outflows: Waterhen River
- Basin countries: Canada
- Max. length: 20.9 km (13.0 mi)
- Max. width: 5.6 km (3.5 mi)
- Surface area: 5,374.2 ha (13,280 acres)
- Average depth: 12 m (39 ft)
- Max. depth: 40.3 m (132 ft)
- Shore length^{1}: 120.5 km (74.9 mi)
- Surface elevation: 496 m (1,627 ft)
- Islands: Misikitew (Big) Island
- ^{1} Shore length is not a well-defined measure.

Lac des Îles, also known as Lac des Isles, is a lake in Meadow Lake Provincial Park in the Canadian Province of Saskatchewan in the boreal forest ecozone of Canada. The primary inflow is the Cold River and its outflow is the Waterhen River. The lake and associated rivers are part of the Hudson Bay drainage basin as the Waterhen River flows into Beaver River, which meets the Churchill River — a major river that flows into Hudson Bay — at Lac Île-à-la-Crosse.

As most of the lake is within a provincial park, there are no cities along the lake's shore. At the western end of the lake is Big Island Lake Cree Territory Indian reserve and at the eastern end, near where the Waterhen River flows out, is Laumans Landing subdivision. The lake is accessed from Highways 950 and 954.

While the primary inflow for the lake is Cold River, there are several smaller rivers, including Bear Creek and Sukaw Creek that flow into the lake. Upstream from Lac des Îles along the Cold River are several other lakes including Lepine Lake, Pierce Lake, and Cold Lake. Cold Lake straddles the border with neighbouring Alberta and marks the western boundary of Meadow Lake Provincial Park. The Waterhen River starts at the eastern end of the lake and flows east into Waterhen Lake and then on to Beaver River.

== Recreation ==
Lac des Îles is almost entirely within Meadow Lake Provincial Park and as such has many recreational opportunities, including four boat launches, camping, fishing, picnicking, hiking, and swimming.

Murray Doell Campground is on the northern shore of Lac des Îles along Highway 950 and Bear Creek and offers 43 electric campsites. It is 15 kilometres (9.3 mi) west of the junction of Highways 224 and 950.

Big Island Cove Resort is a resort in Meadow Lake Provincial Park on the southern shore of Lac des Îles. Founded in 1952, it offers 14 rentable cabins, 27 campsites, beach access, and water sport rentals. Rentals include fishing boats, paddle boards, and kayaks. There is also a general store that carries tackle, souvenirs, confectionery, and groceries. The resort has beach access and there are plenty of nearby nature hiking trails. Highway 954 provides access to the resort.

Northern Cross Resort is also within the park's boundary on the southern shore of Lac des Îles, only a short distance west from Big Island Cove Resort along Highway 954. This resort offers full-service camping, modern cabins for rent, boating with rentals, and access to a sandy beach and nature trails.

== Fish species ==
Fish species found in Lac des Îles include northern pike, walleye, yellow perch, and whitefish.

== See also ==
- List of lakes of Saskatchewan
- Tourism in Saskatchewan
