= List of Saskatchewan provincial highways =

Saskatchewan Provincial Highway System
- Standard highway markers for Saskatchewan

Highway names
- Provincial Highways: Saskatchewan Highway XX (Hwy XX)

System links
- Provincial highways in Saskatchewan

This is a list of Saskatchewan's highways:

Only Highways 1, 2, 5, 6, 7, 11, 12, 16, and 39 contain sections of divided highway. Speed limits range from 90 to 110 km/h (55 to 70 mph). Saskatchewan is the only province bordering the United States with no direct connection to the Interstate Highway System.

== Named routes ==
- Can Am Highway
- Circle Drive
- Hanson Lake Road
- Little Swan Road
- Louis Riel Trail
- McBride Lake Road
- Northern Woods and Water Route
- Ring Road
- Red Coat Trail
- Regina Bypass
- Saskatoon Freeway
- Saskota Travel Route
- Trans-Canada Highway
- Veterans Memorial Highway
- Yellowhead Highway

== Primary (1–99) ==
These are primary highways maintained by the provincial government. Almost all of these highways are paved for most of their length. Highways 1, 11, and 16 are the most important highways and are divided highways for much of their lengths, with some sections at expressway or freeway standards.

Number	Length (km)	Length (mi)	Southern or western terminus	Northern or eastern terminus	Local names	Formed	Removed	Notes
Highway 1 (TCH)	653.6	406.1	Hwy 1 (TCH) at Alberta border near Walsh, AB	PTH 1 (TCH) Manitoba border near Fleming	Trans-Canada Highway	c. 1940	current	Passes through Swift Current, Moose Jaw, and Regina.
Highway 1	610	380	United States border at Monchy	Meadow Lake		—	c. 1940	Replaced by Hwy 4.
Highway 2	797.7	495.7	MT 24 at United States border at West Poplar	Hwy 102 at La Ronge	• Veterans Memorial Highway (Moose Jaw – Prince Albert) • CanAm Highway (Prince Albert – La Ronge)	—	—	Passes through Moose Jaw and Prince Albert.
Highway 3	612.0	380.3	Hwy 45 at Alberta border near Alcurve, AB	PTH 77 Manitoba border near Armit	CanAm Highway (Prince Albert – Melfort)	—	—	Passes through Prince Albert and Melfort.
Highway 3	282	175	Pierceland	Hwy 3 / Hwy 55 at Shellbrook		—	1960s	Section replaced by Hwy 55.
Highway 4	652.2	405.3	US 191 at United States border at Monchy	Hwy 224 / Hwy 904 at Meadow Lake Provincial Park		c. 1940	current	Passes through Swift Current, Rosetown, North Battleford, and Meadow Lake.
Highway 4	650	400	Alberta border near Walsh, AB	Manitoba border near Fleming		—	c. 1940	Replaced by Hwy 1.
Highway 5	380.2	236.2	Hwy 11 / Hwy 16 (TCH) in Saskatoon	PR 363 at Manitoba border near Togo		—	—	Passes through Humboldt.
Highway 5	275	171	Alberta border at Lloydminster	Hwy 5 in Saskatoon	Yellowhead Highway	—	1976	Replaced by Hwy 16.
Highway 5	115	71	Former Hwy 5 (present-day Hwy 16) near Langham	Hwy 5 near Bruno		—	1950s	Former segment; Hwy 5 was rerouted to pass through Saskatoon. Replaced by segments of Hwy 305, Hwy 784, Hwy 27, and Hwy 670.
Highway 5	21	13	Hwy 5 near Togo	Hwy 10 west of Roblin, MB		—	1960s	Replaced by Hwy 369.
Highway 6	518.4	322.1	MT 16 at United States border at Regway	Hwy 55 near Choiceland	CanAm Highway (Corinne – Melfort)	—	—	Passes through Regina and Melfort.
Highway 7	262.7	163.2	Hwy 9 at Alberta border near Alsask	Hwy 11 / Hwy 14 / Hwy 16 (TCH) in Saskatoon		—	—	Passes through Kindersley and Rosetown.
Highway 8	410.0	254.8	ND 28 at United States border at Elmore	Hwy 982 in the Porcupine Provincial Forest		—	—	
Highway 9	606.2	376.7	ND 8 at United States border at Northgate	PR 283 at Manitoba border near The Pas, MB	• Saskota Flyway • Northern Woods & Water Route (Hwy 3 - Manitoba)	—	—	Passes through Yorkton.
Highway 10	225.1	139.9	Hwy 1 (TCH) near Balgonie	PTH 5 at Manitoba border near Roblin, MB		—	—	Passes through Melville and Yorkton.
Highway 10	52	32	Hwy 10 in Melville	Hwy 10 in Yorkton		—	1960s	Passed through Willowbrook; replaced by sections of Hwy 47 and Hwy 52.
Highway 10A	5.0	3.1	Through Yorkton			—	—	Former Hwy 10.
Highway 11	391.4	243.2	Hwy 1 (TCH) near Regina	Hwy 2 near Prince Albert	Louis Riel Trail	—	—	Passes through Saskatoon.
Highway 11A	7.3	4.5	Hwy 6 at Regina	Hwy 11 near Regina		2019	current	Former Hwy 11 section.
Highway 11	84	52	Hwy 11 in Saskatoon	Hwy 11 in Rosthern		—	1960s	Passed through Waldheim; replaced by sections of Hwy 12 and Hwy 312.
Highway 12	133.9	83.2	Hwy 11 in Saskatoon	Hwy 3 near Shell Lake		—	—	
Highway 12	150	93	Saskatoon	Hwy 2 near Prince Albert		—	c. 1950s	Passed through Waldheim; replaced by sections of Hwy 11; now sections of Hwy 12 and Hwy 312.
Highway 13	675.3	419.6	Hwy 501 at Alberta border near Govenlock	PTH 2 at Manitoba border near Antler	Red Coat Trail	—	—	Passes through Weyburn.
Highway 14	253.2	157.3	Hwy 13 Alberta border near Macklin	Hwy 11 (Idylwyld Drive) in Saskatoon		—	—	
Highway 14	410	250	Hwy 14 in Saskatoon	Manitoba border near Marchwell	Yellowhead Highway	—	1976	Replaced by Hwy 16.
Highway 14	47	29	Hwy 14 near Landis	Hwy 14 in Biggar		—	1970s	Replaced by sections of Hwy 51 and Hwy 656.
Highway 15	449.6	279.4	Hwy 4 near Rosetown	Hwy 16 (TCH) near Bredenbury		—	—	Passes through Outlook and Melville.
Highway 16 (TCH/YH)	689.2	428.2	Hwy 16 (TCH) at Alberta border in Lloydminster	PTH 16 (TCH) at Manitoba border near Marchwell	• Yellowhead Highway • Trans-Canada Highway	1976	current	Passes through North Battleford, Saskatoon and Yorkton.
Highway 16	238	148	Hwy 1 near White City	Manitoba border near Maryfield		—	1976	Replaced by Hwy 48.
Highway 16A (TCH)	4.4	2.7	Through Yorkton			—	—	Former Hwy 16.
Highway 16A (TCH)	6.6	4.1	Hwy 4 / Hwy 40 in Battleford	Hwy 16 / Hwy 40 in North Battleford		—	c. 2003	Former Hwy 16; decommissioned in conjunction with the closure of the original Battlefords Bridge to vehicular traffic.
Highway 16B (TCH)	3.8	2.4	Through North Battleford			—	—	
Highway 17	158.7	98.6	Hwy 14 near Macklin	Hwy 641 at Onion Lake		—	—	Runs along the Alberta-Saskatchewan border; cosigned as Alberta Highway 17 for the majority of its length; passes through Lloydminster.
Highway 17	—	—	Hwy 32 near Empress, AB	Hwy 14 / Hwy 17 near Macklin		—	1940s	Passed through Estuary and Alsask.
Highway 18	711.9	442.4	Hwy 13 near Robsart	PTH 3 at Manitoba border near Gainsborough		—	—	Passes through Estevan.
Highway 19	269.3	167.3	Hwy 18 near Mankota	Hwy 15 near Hawarden		—	—	
Highway 20	291.1	180.9	Hwy 11 near Lumsden	Hwy 3 near Birch Hills		—	—	Passes through Humboldt.
Highway 21	714.6	444.0	S-223 at United States border at Willow Creek	Hwy 919 / Hwy 950 in Meadow Lake Provincial Park		—	—	Passes through Kindersley.
Highway 21	—	—	Hwy 21 / Hwy 32 at Leader	Onion Lake		—	1930s	Replaced by Hwy 17.
Highway 22	273.4	169.9	Hwy 20 near Bulyea Hwy 10 at Balcarres	Hwy 35 near Lipton PR 478 at Manitoba border near Binscarth		—	—	42 km (26 mi) gap near Fort Qu'Appelle.
Highway 23	165.6	102.9	Hwy 9 at Bertwell	Hwy 55 near Carrot River		—	—	
Highway 23	—	—	Hwy 8 at Calder	Manitoba border near MacNutt		—	1940s	
Highway 23	28	17	Hwy 35 in Nipawin	Hwy 23 / Hwy 123 near Carrot River	Kelsey Trail	—	1970s	Replaced by Hwy 55.
Highway 24	56.3	35.0	Hwy 3 in Spiritwood	Chitek Lake		—	—	
Highway 25	27.0	16.8	Hwy 2 near St. Louis	Hwy 3 near Birch Hills		c. 1970	current	Former segment of Hwy 3.
Highway 26	198.3	123.2	Hwy 4 near North Battleford	Hwy 224 / Hwy 950 at Goodsoil		—	—	
Highway 27	33.9	21.1	Hwy 41 at Aberdeen	Hwy 2 near Prud'homme		1940s	current	Former segment of Hwy 5.
Highway 27	50	31	Saskatoon	Hwy 5 at Aberdeen		—	1940s	Replaced by Hwy 5.
Highway 28	59.8	37.2	Hwy 18 near Lake Alma	Hwy 13 near Trossachs		1960s	current	Former section of Hwy 18.
Highway 29	49.7	30.9	Hwy 14 at Wilkie	Hwy 40 near Battleford		—	—	
Highway 29	—	—	Hwy 29 at Wilkie	Hwy 31 at Plenty		—	1940s	Replaced by Hwy 657.
Highway 30	59.6	37.0	Eston Riverside Regional Park	Hwy 7 near Brock		—	—	
Highway 30	123	76	Hwy 32 near Lemsford	Hwy 31 near Kerrobert		—	1970s	Lemsford – Glidden section decommissioned in the 1950s (now Hwy 649); remainder became Hwy 21.
Highway 31	185.3	115.1	Hwy 14 near Macklin	Hwy 4 near Rosetown		—	—	
Highway 32	141.5	87.9	Hwy 21 at Leader	Hwy 1 (TCH) near Swift Current		—	—	
Highway 32	45	28	Alberta border near Empress, AB	Hwy 21 / Hwy 32 at Leader		1930s	1940s	Replaced by Hwy 741.
Highway 33	138.9	86.3	Hwy 47 at Stoughton	Hwy 1 (TCH) in Regina		—	—	
Highway 34	62.3	38.7	S-511 at United States border near Big Beaver	Hwy 13 near Ogema		—	—	U.S. border crossing permanently closed.
Highway 35	568.9	353.5	US 85 at United States border near Oungre	Tobin Lake	CanAm Highway (U.S. Border – Weyburn)	—	—	Passes through Weyburn and Nipawin.
Highway 35	50	31	Amisk Lake	Manitoba border at Flin Flon		—	1967	Discontinued segment of Hwy 35; connection was not constructed and renumbered to Hwy 167.
Highway 36	144.2	89.6	MT 13 United States border near Coronach	Hwy 2 near Moose Jaw		—	—	
Highway 37	186.2	115.7	S-241 at United States border near Climax	Hwy 32 at Cabri		—	—	
Highway 38	89.0	55.3	Hwy 5 at Kuroki	Hwy 23 near Chelan		—	—	
Highway 39	263.5	163.7	US 52 at United States border at North Portal	Hwy 1 (TCH) / Hwy 301 near Moose Jaw	CanAm Highway (Weyburn – Corinne)	—	—	Passes through Estevan and Weyburn.
Highway 39A	11.2	7.0	Through Estevan			2015	current	Former Hwy 39.
Highway 40	280.5	174.3	Hwy 14 at Alberta border near Marsden	Hwy 3 near Shellbrook	Poundmaker Trail (Alberta – Battleford)	—	—	Passes through North Battleford.
Highway 41	163.4	101.5	Hwy 5 in Saskatoon	Hwy 3 / Hwy 6 in Melfort		—	—	
Highway 41	46	29	Alberta border near Compeer, AB	Hwy 31 near Kerrobert		—	1940s	Replaced by Hwy 51.
Highway 41A	8.4	5.2	Hwy 41 near Melfort	Hwy 3 / Hwy 6 / Hwy 41 at Melfort		—	—	
Highway 42	205.0	127.4	Hwy 2 at Tuxford	Hwy 15 near Milden		—	—	
Highway 43	129.5	80.5	Hwy 4 near Neville	Hwy 2 near Ettington		—	—	
Highway 44	329.0	204.4	Hwy 7 at Alsask	Hwy 11 at Davidson		—	—	
Highway 45	115.5	71.8	Hwy 7 near Delisle	Hwy 42 near Lucky Lake		—	—	
Highway 45	16	9.9	United States border at Port of Torquay	Hwy 18 at Torquay		—	1930s	Replaced by Hwy 50; now Hwy 350.
Highway 46	22.3	13.9	Hwy 6 in Regina	Hwy 1 (TCH) / Hwy 622 at Balgonie		1980s	current	
Highway 46	—	—	Former Hwy 29 near Plenty	Former Hwy 1 near Biggar		—	1930s	Decommissioned and replaced by the Kerrobert–Biggar section of Hwy 51.
Highway 46	80	50	Claydon	Hwy 4 near Masefield		1960s	1970s	Replaced by Hwy 18.
Highway 47	358	222	ND 40 at United States border near Estevan	Hwy 49 at Preeceville		—	—	Passes through Estevan and Melville.
Highway 48	237.8	147.8	Hwy 1 (TCH) near White City	PR 257 at Manitoba border near Maryfield		1976	current	Former Hwy 16.
Highway 48	29	18	United States border at Willow Creek	Hwy 13 at Govenlock		—	1960s	Replaced by Hwy 348; now part of Hwy 21.
Highway 49	165.2	102.7	Hwy 35 near Fosston	PTH 49 at Manitoba border near Benito, MB		—	—	
Highway 50	16	9.9	United States border at Port of Torquay	Hwy 18 at Torquay		—	1960s	Replaced by Hwy 350.
Highway 51	154.7	96.1	Hwy 12 at Alberta border near Compeer, AB	Hwy 4 at Biggar		—	—	
Highway 52	70.4	43.7	Hwy 15 / Hwy 310 near Ituna	Hwy 10A in Yorkton		—	—	Former Hwy 10 alignment between Willowbrook and Yorkton.
Highway 52A	3.1	1.9	Hwy 52 west of Yorkton	Hwy 16 (TCH) west of Yorkton		2012	current	
Highway 53	20	12	Hwy 22 at Killaly	Hwy 10 / Hwy 15 at Melville		—	1950s	Replaced by Hwy 47.
Highway 54	16.7	10.4	Hwy 11 near Lumsden	Regina Beach		—	—	
Highway 55	650.1	404.0	Hwy 55 at Alberta border near Pierceland	Hwy 9 at Mountain Cabin	Northern Woods & Water Route	—	—	Passes through Meadow Lake, Prince Albert and Nipawin.
Highway 55	270	170	Alberta border near Alcurve, AB	Hwy 3 / Hwy 55 at Shellbrook		—	c. 1960s	Section replaced by Hwy 3.
Highway 56	55.4	34.4	Hwy 1 (TCH) at Indian Head	Hwy 210 at Echo Valley Provincial Park		—	—	
Highway 57	19.3	12.0	Hwy 5 near Kamsack	PTH 57 (TCH) at Manitoba border near Madge Lake		—	—	
Highway 58	130.5	81.1	Hwy 18 near Fir Mountain	Hwy 1 (TCH) / Hwy 19 at Chaplin		—	—	
Highway 60	23.2	14.4	Pike Lake Provincial Park	Hwy 7 near Saskatoon		—	—	
Highway 80	66.7	41.4	Hwy 22 near Esterhazy	Hwy 8 / Hwy 10 near Wroxton		—	—	
Highway 99	20.8	12.9	Hwy 20 near Craven	Hwy 6 near Fairy Hill		—	—	
Former; Unbuilt or under construction

== Northern (100–199) ==
Major northern highways, usually corresponding to a "parent" 1-99 highway.

Number	Length (km)	Length (mi)	Southern or western terminus	Northern or eastern terminus	Local names	Formed	Removed	Notes
Highway 101	44	27	Cole Bay	Hwy 155		—	1980s	Replaced by Hwy 965
Highway 102	220.9	137.3	Hwy 2 at La Ronge	Southend		—	—	
Highway 104	47	29	Hwy 4 in Meadow Lake Provincial Park	Keeley Lake		—	1980s	Replaced by Hwy 904
Highway 105	275	171	Hwy 102 near Southend	Rabbit Lake mine		—	1980s	Replaced by Hwy 905
Highway 106	325.1	202.0	Hwy 55 near Smeaton	Hwy 167 at Creighton	Hanson Lake Road	—	—	
Highway 120	90.0	55.9	Hwy 55 near Meath Park	Hwy 106 / Hwy 920 in Narrow Hills Provincial Park		—	—	
Highway 123	137.1	85.2	Hwy 55 north of Carrot River	Cumberland House		—	—	
Highway 124	64	40	Hwy 55 near Green Lake	Doré Lake		—	1980s	Replaced by Hwy 924
Highway 135	120.5	74.9	Hwy 106 west of Creighton	Sandy Bay		—	—	
Highway 155	298.9	185.7	Hwy 55 at Green Lake	Hwy 955 at La Loche		1947	current	
Highway 163	105	65	Hwy 23 / Hwy 55 / Hwy 123 north of Carrot River	Hwy 9 near Mountain Cabin	Kelsey Trail	—	1980s	Replaced by Hwy 55
Highway 165	291.6	181.2	Hwy 155 near Beauval	Hwy 106 near Big Sandy Lake		—	—	
Highway 167	49.4	30.7	Amisk Lake	PTH 10 at Manitoba border in Flin Flon		c. 1967	current	Previously part of Hwy 35
Highway 169	120	75	Hwy 2 near Montreal Lake	Hwy 2 / Hwy 165 south of La Ronge		1960s	1980s	Former Hwy 2; replaced by Hwy 969
Former

== Secondary ==
=== 200–299 ===
These are usually highways connecting from a "parent" 1-99 highway to a recreational area.

Number	Length (km)	Length (mi)	Southern or western terminus	Northern or eastern terminus	Local names	Formed	Removed	Notes
Highway 201	19.2	11.9	Hwy 1 (TCH) near Broadview	Hwy 247 near West End		—	—	
Highway 202	12.5	7.8	Hwy 2 near Tuxford	Buffalo Pound Provincial Park		—	—	
Highway 204	5	3.1	Hwy 4 near Cochin	Bayview Heights	Bayview Heights Road	—	—	Entirely within The Battlefords Provincial Park
Highway 209	4.9	3.0	Moose Mountain Provincial Park	Hwy 9 near Kenosee Lake		—	—	
Highway 210	20.9	13.0	Hwy 10 southwest of Fort Qu'Appelle	Hwy 35 in Fort Qu'Appelle		—	—	
Highway 211	6.5	4.0	Hwy 11 in Dundurn	Blackstrap Provincial Park		—	—	
Highway 212	25.9	16.1	Fort Carlton Provincial Historic Park	Hwy 11 at Duck Lake		—	—	
Highway 219	96.4	59.9	Hwy 44 near Cutbank	Hwy 11 / Hwy 16 (TCH) in Saskatoon	Chief Whitecap Trail	—	—	
Highway 220	21.6	13.4	Rowan's Ravine Provincial Park	Hwy 20 at Bulyea		—	—	
Highway 221	3.8	2.4	Cypress Hills Interprovincial Park	Hwy 21 south of Maple Creek		—	—	
Highway 224	46.0	28.6	Hwy 26 / Hwy 954 near Goodsoil	Hwy 4 / Hwy 904 near Dorintosh		—	—	Entirely within Meadow Lake Provincial Park
Highway 225	36.7	22.8	Hwy 312 near Batoche	Hwy 2 near Domremy		—	—	
Highway 229	21.1	13.1	Hwy 47 near Good Spirit Acres	Hwy 9 near Gorlitz		—	—	
Highway 240	56.7	35.2	Hwy 55 near Shellbrook	Hwy 263 in Prince Albert National Park		—	—	
Highway 247	49.7	30.9	Hwy 47 near Melville Beach	Hwy 9 near Stockholm		—	—	
Highway 255	22.8	14.2	Hwy 55 near Nipawin	Tobin Lake		—	—	
Highway 263	63.4	39.4	Hwy 2 near Christopher Lake	Hwy 264 at Waskesiu Lake		—	—	Former section of Hwy 2
Highway 264	14.0	8.7	Hwy 263 at Waskesiu Lake	Hwy 2 east of Prince Albert National Park		—	—	Former section of Hwy 2
Highway 265	28.8	17.9	Hwy 926 / Hwy 970	Hwy 120 near Torch Lake		—	—	
Highway 271	53.8	33.4	Fort Walsh	Hwy 21 in Maple Creek		—	—	
Former

=== 300–399 ===
These are usually highways connecting from a "parent" 1-99 highway to minor communities near the "parent" route.

Number	Length (km)	Length (mi)	Southern or western terminus	Northern or eastern terminus	Local names	Formed	Removed	Notes
Highway 301	21.3	13.2	Hwy 1 (TCH) / Hwy 39 near Moose Jaw	Hwy 202 near Buffalo Pound Prov. Park		—	—	
Highway 302	72.2	44.9	Nisbet Provincial Forest	Weldon Ferry		—	—	Passes through Prince Albert
Highway 303	82.2	51.1	Hwy 16 (TCH) near Lloydminster	Hwy 26 in Turtleford		—	—	
Highway 304	48.5	30.1	Hwy 26 near Loon Lake	Hwy 4 near Meadow Lake		—	—	
Highway 305	30.2	18.8	Hwy 16 (TCH) near Langham	Hwy 11 at Warman		—	—	Former section of Hwy 5
Highway 306	66.8	41.5	Hwy 6 near Estlin	Hwy 35 near Cedoux		—	—	
Highway 307	47.0	29.2	Hwy 7 near Flaxcombe	Hwy 21 near Coleville		—	—	
Highway 308	14.8	9.2	Hwy 8 near Rocanville	PR 571 at Manitoba border near Welwyn		—	—	
Highway 309	18.0	11.2	Hwy 9 near Ebenezer	Hwy 637 / Hwy 726 at Rhein		—	—	
Highway 310	130.8	81.3	Hwy 10 near Balcarres	Hwy 5 at Kuroki		—	—	
Highway 312	78.0	48.5	Hwy 12 near Hepburn	Hwy 2 near Wakaw		—	—	
Highway 314	76	47	Former Hwy 14 near Springside	Hwy 49 at Preeceville		—	1976	Replaced by Hwy 47
Highway 316	16.0	9.9	Hwy 16 (TCH) near Clavet	Hwy 5 east of Saskatoon		—	—	
Highway 317	94.0	58.4	Hwy 7 near Marengo	Hwy 31 at Primate		—	—	
Highway 318	27.9	17.3	Hwy 18 at Carnduff	Hwy 361 near Alida		—	—	
Highway 319	52	32	Hwy 19 near Mankota	Wood Mountain		—	1970s	Replaced by Hwy 18
Highway 320	26.2	16.3	Hwy 2 near Domremy	Hwy 20 near Crystal Springs		—	—	
Highway 321	33.0	20.5	Hwy 545 at Alberta border near Burstall	Hwy 21 near Liebenthal		—	—	
Highway 322	29.3	18.2	Hwy 20 north of Craven	Hwy 220 west of Bulyea		—	—	
Highway 324	18.1	11.2	Hwy 378 near Redfield	Range Road 3120 near Mayfair		—	—	
Highway 330	94	58	Hwy 31 / Hwy 51 near Kerrobert	Hwy 40 near Cut Knife		—	1970s	Replaced by Hwy 21
Highway 332	43.7	27.2	Hwy 633 at Hazlet	Hwy 32 near Cantuar		—	—	
Highway 334	95.6	59.4	Hwy 13 / Hwy 34 near Ogema	Hwy 6 / Hwy 39 at Corinne		—	—	
Highway 335	50.5	31.4	Hwy 6 at Gronlid	Hwy 23 near Arborfield		—	—	
Highway 336	23	14	Hwy 2 near Rockglen	Hwy 36 near Coronach		—	1970s	Replaced by Hwy 18
Highway 339	49.4	30.7	Hwy 334 at Avonlea	Hwy 39 near Drinkwater		—	—	
Highway 340	30.4	18.9	Hwy 16 (TCH) at Radisson	Hwy 40 at Hafford		—	—	
Highway 342	123.3	76.6	Hwy 44 at Plato	Hwy 42 near Beechy		—	—	
Highway 343	33.8	21.0	Hwy 631 at Simmie	Hwy 4 near Blumenort		—	—	
Highway 344	28	17	Hwy 42 near Dinsmore	Hwy 45 near Macrorie		—	1970s	Replaced by Hwy 44
Highway 345	32	20	Hwy 45 near Macrorie	Hwy 19 near Loreburn		—	1970s	Replaced by Hwy 44
Highway 348	29	18	United States border at Willow Creek	Hwy 13 at Govenlock		1960	c. 1980s	Became part of Hwy 21.
Highway 349	69.1	42.9	Hwy 6 at Naicam	Hwy 38 near Nobleville		—	—	
Highway 350	16.4	10.2	ND 42 at United States border at Port of Torquay	Hwy 18 at Torquay		—	—	
Highway 354	20.1	12.5	Hwy 11 at Bethune	Hwy 733 at Dilke		—	—	
Highway 355	43.5	27.0	Hwy 788 west of Spruce Home	Hwy 55 near Meath Park		—	—	
Highway 357	20.5	12.7	Hwy 8 south of Kamsack	Hwy 5 / Hwy 369 near Togo		—	—	
Highway 358	42.5	26.4	Hwy 18 near Wood Mountain	Hwy 13 near Limerick		—	—	
Highway 361	120.5	74.9	Hwy 47 near Cullen	PR 345 at Manitoba border near Fertile		—	—	
Highway 362	4.2	2.6	Hwy 1 (TCH) near Emerald Park	Hwy 46 near Pilot Butte	Pilot Butte Access Road	—	—	Unsigned highway
Highway 363	199.8	124.1	Hwy 4 near Swift Current	Hwy 2 in Moose Jaw		—	—	
Highway 364	37.3	23.2	Hwy 1 (TCH) / Hwy 46 near Balgonie	Hwy 10 near Edgeley		—	—	
Highway 365	35.2	21.9	Hwy 2 in Watrous	Hwy 16 (TCH) near Plunkett		—	—	
Highway 367	23.8	14.8	Hwy 42 near Eyebrow	Hwy 19 near Bridgeford		—	—	
Highway 368	89.4	55.6	Hwy 5 near Muenster	Hwy 3 at Beatty		—	—	
Highway 369	20.9	13.0	Hwy 5 / Hwy 357 near Togo	Hwy 10 west of Roblin, MB		—	—	Former section of Hwy 5
Highway 371	41.4	25.7	Hwy 537at Alberta border near Horsham	Hwy 21 near Fox Valley		—	—	
Highway 373	14.0	8.7	Hwy 42 east of Lucky Lake	Hwy 45 at Birsay		—	—	
Highway 374	50.0	31.1	Hwy 21 west of Tramping Lake	Hwy 14 north of Scott		—	—	
Highway 375	3.3	2.1	Township Road 412 at Hepburn	Hwy 12 near Hepburn	Hepburn Access Road	—	—	Unsigned highway
Highway 376	120.5	74.9	Hwy 14 near Asquith	Hwy 324 near Redfield		—	—	
Highway 377	22.9	14.2	Hwy 6 near Ceylon	Hwy 28 in Radville		—	—	
Highway 378	108.2	67.2	Hwy 4 near North Battleford	Hwy 3 / Hwy 24 at Spiritwood		—	—	
Highway 379	18.4	11.4	Hwy 4 near Wymark	Township Road 132 at McMahon		—	—	
Highway 381	24.5	15.2	Hwy 80 north of Churchbridge	PR 547 at Manitoba border near MacNutt		—	—	
Highway 394	10.5	6.5	Hwy 16 (TCH) near Saskatoon	Hwy 316 near Clavet	Patience Lake Road	—	—	Unsigned highway
Highway 396	3.0	1.9	Hwy 668 near Guernsey	Hwy 16 (TCH) near Guernsey		—	—	Unsigned highway; now part of Highway 668
Highway 397	30.2	18.8	Hwy 665 / Hwy 763 at Allan	Hwy 16 (TCH) near Elstow		—	—	
Former

== Municipal roads ==
=== 600–699 ===
The 600-series highways are minor highways that run north and south; generally, the last two digits increase from east to west. Highway 600 is near the eastern border with Manitoba and Highway 699 is near the western border with Alberta. Many of these highways are gravel for some of their length.

=== 700–799 ===
The 700-series highways are minor highways that run east and west; generally, the last two digits increase from south to north. Many of these highways are gravel for some of their length.

== Northern secondary (900–999) ==
These are roads that generally provide access to isolated, northern communities. Most of these highways are unpaved for their entire length.

Number	Length (km)	Length (mi)	Southern or western terminus	Northern or eastern terminus	Local names	Formed	Removed	Notes
Highway 903	179	111	Hwy 55 near Meadow Lake	Cole Bay		—	—	
Highway 904	47	29	Hwy 4 / Hwy 224 near Dorintosh	Meadow Lake Prov. Park northern boundary		—	—	Formerly Hwy 104.
Highway 905	456	283	Hwy 102 near Southend	Black Lake		—	—	Formerly Hwy 105.
Highway 908	21	13	Île-à-la Crosse	Hwy 155 near Île-à-la Crosse		—	—	
Highway 909	30	19	Hwy 155 near Bear Creek	Turnor Lake		—	—	
Highway 910	33	21	Hwy 165 near Lac La Ronge First Nation	Besnard Lake		—	—	
Highway 911	31	19	Hwy 106 south of Deschambault Lake	Deschambault Lake		—	—	
Highway 912	101	63	Hwy 913 near Narrow Hills Prov. Park	Lac La Ronge Prov. Park		—	—	
Highway 913	65	40	Hwy 120 near White Gull Lake	Hwy 106 in Narrow Hills Prov. Park		—	—	
Highway 914	268	167	Hwy 165 south of Pinehouse	Key Lake mine		—	—	
Highway 915	36	22	Hwy 102 near La Ronge	Stanley Mission		—	—	
Highway 916	112	70	Hwy 2 north of Montreal Lake	Hwy 924 at Sled Lake		—	—	
Highway 917	25	16	Hwy 916 near Smoothstone Lake	Doré Lake		—	—	
Highway 918	92	57	Hwy 165 near Beauval	Patuanak		—	—	
Highway 919	46	29	Hwy 21 / Hwy 950 in Meadow Lake Prov. Park	Cold Lake Air Weapons Range		—	—	
Highway 920	40	25	Hwy 106 / Hwy 120 in Narrow Hills Prov. Park	Hwy 933		—	—	
Highway 921	25	16	Hwy 916	Hwy 937 / Hwy 939		—	—	
Highway 922	93	58	Hwy 55 near Bodmin	Hwy 916 near Sled Lake		—	—	
Highway 923	17	11	Hwy 922	dead end		—	—	
Highway 924	64	40	Hwy 55 near Cowan Lake	Dore Lake		—	—	Formerly Hwy 124.
Highway 925	76	47	Hwy 155 near Buffalo Narrows	Michel Village		—	—	
Highway 926	79	49	Hwy 120 near Candle Lake	Hwy 969 near Montreal Lake		—	—	
Highway 927	24	15	Hwy 912 near Narrow Hills Prov. Park	East Trout-Nipekamew Lake Prov. Rec. Site		—	—	
Highway 928	10	6.2	Hwy 120 near Narrow Hills Prov. Park	Harding Road		—	—	
Highway 929	30	19	Hwy 916 near Smoothstone Lake	dead end		—	—	
Highway 930	14	8.7	Hwy 2 near Montreal Lake	Hwy 969 near Montreal Lake		—	—	Replaced by Hwy 969.
Highway 931	5	3.1	Hwy 926	Snowfield Lakes		—	—	
Highway 932	20	12	Hwy 920 near Narrow Hills Prov. Park	Hwy 106		—	—	
Highway 933	10	6.2	Hwy 920	Hwy 106		—	—	
Highway 934	14	8.7	Hwy 912 near Wapawekka Lake	dead end		—	—	
Highway 935	8	5.0	Hwy 165	Lac La Ronge First Nation		—	—	
Highway 936	30	19	Hwy 2 north of Weyakwin	dead end		—	—	
Highway 937	5	3.1	Pear Lake Road	Hwy 921 / Hwy 939		—	—	
Highway 938	7	4.3	Hwy 921 near Randall Lake	dead end		—	—	
Highway 939	38	24	Hwy 916	Hwy 921 / Hwy 937		—	—	
Highway 940	5	3.1	Delaronde Lake	Hwy 922 north of Bodmin		—	—	
Highway 941	22	14	Hwy 904 in Meadow Lake Prov. Park	Waterhen Lake		—	—	
Highway 942	56	35	Hwy 55 near Bodmin	local road	Cowan Lake Road	—	—	
Highway 943	69	43	Hwy 698 near Meetoos	Hwy 942 near Big River		—	—	
Highway 945	25	16	Hwy 24 near Chitek Lake	Hwy 943 near Island Lake		—	—	
Highway 946	33	21	Hwy 24 at Leoville	Hwy 943		—	—	
Highway 950	35	22	Hwy 21 / Hwy 919 near Pierceland	Hwy 26 / Hwy 224 near Goodsoil		—	—	Entirely within Meadow Lake Provincial Park
Highway 951	15	9.3	Hwy 941 near Waterhen Lake	Hwy 903 east of Waterhen Lake		—	—	
Highway 952	18	11	Hwy 263 near Emma Lake	Hwy 953 near Anglin Lake		—	—	
Highway 953	32	20	Hwy 263 near Emma Lake	Hwy 2 near Anglin Lake		—	—	
Highway 954	13	8.1	Hwy 26 near Goodsoil	Lac des Îles		—	—	
Highway 955	245	152	Hwy 155 near La Loche	Cluff Lake mine	Semchuk Trail	—	—	Formerly Hwy 155
Highway 956	44	27	Alberta border near Garson Lake	Hwy 155 near La Loche	Garson Lake Road	—	—	
Highway 962	40	25	Uranium City	Beaverlodge Lake		—	—	Disconnected from the rest of Saskatchewan highway system.
Highway 963	15	9.3	Meeyomoot Road	Hwy 913	MacDonnell Lake Road	—	—	
Highway 964	18	11	Black Lake	Stony Rapids		—	—	Replaced by Hwy 905.
Highway 965	46	29	Hwy 903 near Cole Bay	Hwy 155 near Beauval		—	—	Formerly Hwy 101.
Highway 966	30	19	Hwy 905 near Stony Rapids	dead end		—	—	
Highway 967	5	3.1	Sturgeon Landing	Manitoba border		—	—	
Highway 968	2	1.2	Serves Fond-du-Lac			—	—	
Highway 969	120	75	Hwy 2 near Montreal Lake	Hwy 165 south of La Ronge		—	—	Formerly Hwy 169.
Highway 970	15	9.3	Hwy 265 / Hwy 926 near Clearsand Lake	dead end		—	—	
Highway 980	85	53	Range Road 1304	Hwy 3 near Armit		—	—	
Highway 981	22	14	Township Road 441	Hwy 980 near Armit	Garson Lake Road	—	—	
Highway 982	57	35	Hwy 8 at Swan Plain	Hwy 9 south of Hudson Bay		—	—	
Highway 983	54	34	Hwy 984 near Somme	Hwy 982 in McBride Lake Rec. Site		—	—	
Highway 984	18	11	dead end	Hwy 23 near Somme		—	—	
Highway 994	1.1	0.68	Kinoosao	PR 394 at Manitoba border		—	—	
Highway 995	5	3.1	Wollaston Lake	Hatchet Lake		—	—	
Highway 999	11	6.8	Lake Athabasca	Camsell Portage		—	—	Disconnected from the rest of Saskatchewan highway system.
Former

== See also ==
- Ministry of Highways and Infrastructure
- Transportation in Saskatchewan
