= Ness Lakes =

Group of lakes in Saskatchewan, Canada

- Location in Saskatchewan Ness Lakes (Canada)
- Location: RM of Big River No. 555, Saskatchewan
- Coordinates: 53.8774°N 106.7815°W
- Part of: Churchill River drainage basin
- River sources: Waskesiu Upland
- Primary outflows: Ness Creek
- Basin countries: Canada
- Surface area: 280.4 ha (693 acres)
- Max. depth: 9.2 m (30 ft)
- Shore length^{1}: 12.5 km (7.8 mi)
- Surface elevation: 515 m (1,690 ft)
- Settlements: None
- ^{1} Shore length is not a well-defined measure.

Ness Lakes are a group of five interconnected lakes — the largest of which is Ness Lake — in the Canadian province of Saskatchewan. They are in the Rural Municipality of Big River No. 555 at the western end of the Waskesiu Hills in the boreal forest ecozone of Canada. The western boundary of Prince Albert National Park is directly to the east and the town of Big River is about 15 kilometres (9.3 mi) to the south-west. Access to the lakes is from Nesslin Lake Road, which branches off of Highway 922.

Ness Lakes consist of Ness Lake at about 100 hectares (247 acres) in size and four smaller ones. Numerous small creeks and rivers flow into the lakes from Prince Albert National Park and the surrounding hills and muskeg. The outflow for the lakes is Ness Creek, which flows west into Tie Creek. Tie Creek flows into Delaronde Lake which is connected to the Cowan River via Taggart Creek. There are no communities at the lakes. At the north-west corner of the largest lake is a provincial campground.

== Ness Lake Recreation Site ==
Ness Lake Recreation Site (53.8863°N 106.8007°W) is a 12.55-hectare (31-acre) leased provincial campground at the north-west corner of Ness Lake. It has hiking trails, a boat launch, and a small campground. While there is no ATVing allowed inside the park, there is access to ATVing trails from the park.

== Fish species ==
Fish commonly found in Ness Lakes include walleye, northern pike, and bass. Ness Lake was stocked with 150,000 walleye fry in 2019.

== See also ==
- List of lakes of Saskatchewan
- List of protected areas of Saskatchewan
- Nesset Lake
- Nesslin Lake
