= Saskatchewan Highway 265 =

Provincial highway in Saskatchewan, Canada

Highway 265

Route information
- Maintained by Ministry of Highways and Infrastructure
- Length: 28.8 km (17.9 mi)

Major junctions
- West end: Highway 926 / Highway 970 near Clearsand Lake
- East end: Highway 120 in Candle Lake

Location
- Country: Canada
- Province: Saskatchewan
- Rural municipalities: Paddockwood No. 520

Highway system
- Provincial highways in Saskatchewan
← Highway 264	→ Highway 271

Highway 265 is a provincial highway in the north-east region of Canadian province of Saskatchewan. Saskatchewan's 200-series highways primarily service its recreational areas. The highway runs from Highway 120 to Highway 926 and is about 29 kilometres (18 mi) long.

Highway 265 is the primary road through Candle Lake Provincial Park. Most of the section within the park runs along the western shore of Candle Lake and eastern shore of Torch Lake. It services the communities of Candle Lake, Waskateena Beach, and Tel-Win. Several campgrounds are also accessible from the highway.

== Major intersections ==
Rural municipality	Location	km	mi	Destinations	Notes
Paddockwood No. 520		0.0	0.0	Highway 926 – Meath Park, Montreal Lake, Timber Bay; Highway 970 north – Gaire Lake	Western terminus; southern terminus of Hwy 970; western end of unpaved section
Paddockwood No. 520		9.4	5.8	Bridge over Clearsand Creek	
Paddockwood No. 520	Candle Lake	10.3	6.4	Bruin Boulevard – Van Impe	Eastern end of unpaved section
Paddockwood No. 520	Candle Lake	11.6	7.2	Clearsand access road	
Paddockwood No. 520	Candle Lake	13.6	8.5	Telwin Drive – Telwin, Sanderman	
Paddockwood No. 520	Candle Lake	16.2	10.1	Candle Lake Drive – Onechassa	
Paddockwood No. 520	Candle Lake	16.5	10.3	Lakeview Drive – Candle Lake Provincial Park, Sandy Bay Campground	
Paddockwood No. 520	Candle Lake	18.3	11.4	Lakeview Drive – Sacketts North	
Paddockwood No. 520	Candle Lake	19.2	11.9	Martin Drive – Sacketts North	
Paddockwood No. 520	Candle Lake	19.4	12.1	Bridge over Fisher Creek	
Paddockwood No. 520	Candle Lake	20.3	12.6	Airport Drive – Candle Lake Airpark	
Paddockwood No. 520	Candle Lake	23.7	14.7	Tilley Ray Road – Haydukewich Subdivision, Hanson	
Paddockwood No. 520	Candle Lake	24.4	15.2	Main Street	
Paddockwood No. 520	Candle Lake	28.8	17.9	Highway 120 – Creighton, Flin Flon, Prince Albert	Eastern terminus
1.000 mi = 1.609 km; 1.000 km = 0.621 mi

== See also ==
- Transportation in Saskatchewan
- Roads in Saskatchewan
