= Candle Lake =

Candle Lake may refer to any of the following:

- Candle Lake, Saskatchewan, a resort village in Saskatchewan, Canada
- Candle Lake (Saskatchewan), a lake in Saskatchewan
- Candle Lake Provincial Park, a park in Saskatchewan
- Candle Lake Airpark, an airport in Saskatchewan
