= Smoothstone River =

River in Saskatchewan, Canada

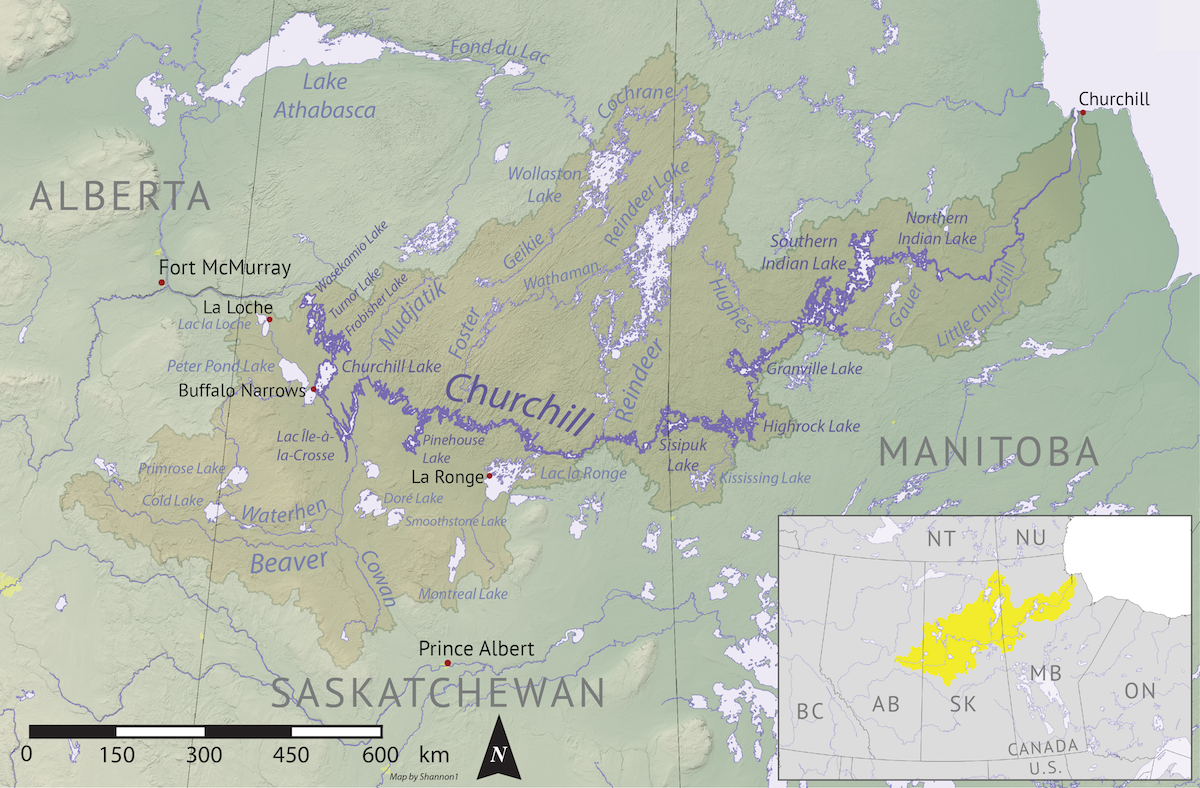
- Map of the Churchill River drainage basin

- Location of river's mouth in Saskatchewan Smoothstone River (Canada)

Location
- Country: Canada
- Province: Saskatchewan

Physical characteristics
- Source: Wabeno Lake
  - location: Prince Albert National Park, Saskatchewan
  - coordinates: 54.3123°N 106.4224°W
  - elevation: 554 m (1,818 ft)
- Mouth: Pinehouse Lake
  - coordinates: 55.3328°N 106.6453°W
  - elevation: 384 m (1,260 ft)

Basin features
- River system: Churchill River
- Tributaries
  - left: Mitawanga Creek
  - right: Randall River
- Waterbodies: Lavallée Lake; Paquin Lake; Clarke Lake; Little Clarke Lake; Smoothstone Lake; Little Emmeline Lake; Emmeline Lake

Smoothstone River is a river in the Canadian province of Saskatchewan. It begins at Wabeno Lake in the Waskesiu Upland and traverses boreal forests and muskeg in the Mid-Boreal Upland en route to Pinehouse Lake of the Churchill River. The Churchill River flows east through Manitoba into Hudson Bay.

Access to Smoothstone River is from Highways 916 and 165.

== Course ==
Smoothstone River begins at the western end of Wabeno Lake of the Waskesiu Hills in Prince Albert National Park and flows west into Lavallée Lake. One of the largest concentrations of nesting American white pelicans and double-crested cormorants in Saskatchewan is supported on Heron Island within Lavallée Lake. From there, the river flows out of the Waskesiu Upland in a northerly direction passing through multiple lakes, the largest of which is Smoothstone Lake. Smoothstone River ends at Pinehouse Lake, which is a lake along the course of the Churchill River.

== Fish species ==
Fish commonly found in the Smoothstone River include northern pike and walleye.

== See also ==
- List of rivers of Saskatchewan
- Hudson Bay drainage basin
