= Saskatchewan Highway 969 =

Provincial highway in Saskatchewan, Canada

Highway 969

Route information
- Maintained by Ministry of Highways and Infrastructure
- Length: 114.6 km (71.2 mi)
- History: Formerly Hwy 169

Major junctions
- South end: CanAm Highway / Highway 2 near Montreal Lake
- Highway 926 near Montreal Lake
- North end: Highway 165 south of La Ronge

Location
- Country: Canada
- Province: Saskatchewan

Highway system
- Provincial highways in Saskatchewan
← Highway 968	→ Highway 970

Highway 969 is a provincial highway in the north-east region of Saskatchewan, Canada. It runs from the CanAm Highway (Highway 2) to Highway 165. Highway 969 is about 115 kilometres (71 mi) long.

== Route description ==
Highway 969 begins at Highway 2 just east of Prince Albert National Park. From there, the road heads east and then swings to the northeast. Highway 969 enters the village of Montreal Lake, which is named after the nearby Montreal Lake. Highway 926 meets Highway 969 just to the east of Montreal Lake and heads east from there. Now paralleling the lake, Highway 969 passes through Timber Bay.

The highway then heads north to the beginning of Montreal River where the original community of Molanosa was located and then continues north to its northern terminus at Highway 165. Highway 969 comes within a few hundred metres of the exact geographical centre of the province of Saskatchewan, which is near the community of Molanosa.

== History ==
The highway was originally part of Provincial Highway 2 that connected Prince Albert to La Ronge. Highway 2 was realigned in the 1960s, and the route was renumbered as Highway 169, but was renumbered to Highway 969 in the early 1980s as part of the establishment of the 900-series highways. Highway 969 previously followed Candle Lake Road south of Montreal Lake but the road was removed from the provincial highway system, and Highway 969 was realigned to follow former Highway 930.

== Major intersections ==
The entire route is in the Northern Saskatchewan Administration District and Division No. 18. From south to north:

Location	km	mi	Destinations	Notes
	0.0	0.0	Highway 2 – Prince Albert, La Ronge	Hwy 969 southern terminus; western end of former Hwy 930
Montreal Lake	7.5	4.7	Candle Lake Road	Former Hwy 969 alignment; eastern end of former Hwy 930
	15.0	9.3	Highway 926 east – Candle Lake	
	114.6	71.2	Highway 165 to Highway 2 – La Ronge, Creighton	Hwy 969 northern terminus; adjacent to Hwy 2 intersection
1.000 mi = 1.609 km; 1.000 km = 0.621 mi
