= Saskatchewan Highway 120 =

Provincial highway in Saskatchewan, Canada

Highway 120
- Highway 120 highlighted in red

Route information
- Maintained by Ministry of Highways and Infrastructure
- Length: 90.0 km (55.9 mi)

Major junctions
- South end: Highway 55 near Meath Park
- North end: Highway 106 / Highway 920 in Narrow Hills Provincial Park

Location
- Country: Canada
- Province: Saskatchewan
- Rural municipalities: Garden River, Paddockwood

Highway system
- Provincial highways in Saskatchewan
← Highway 106	→ Highway 123

Highway 120 is a provincial highway in the Canadian province of Saskatchewan. It runs from Highway 55 at Meath Park to Highway 106 within the Narrow Hills Provincial Park, as well as providing access to Candle Lake and Candle Lake Provincial Park. It is about 90 km (56 mi) long.

== Route description ==
Highway 120 begins in the Rural Municipality of Garden River No. 490 on the eastern outskirts of Meath Park at an intersection with Highway 55 (Northern Woods and Water Route), immediately having an intersection with Railway Avenue (providing access to the village) as it heads north as a paved two-lane highway to enter the Rural Municipality of Paddockwood No. 520. After crossing a small creek, it travels northeast through rural farmland for several kilometres, junctioning with Highway 791 (provides access to nearby Paddockwood) before entering woodlands and having an intersection with Highway 926. Now travelling along the southern limits of Candle Lake and Candle Lake Provincial Park, Highway 120 meets the eastern end of Highway 265 before crossing the Torch River and passing by Minowukaw Beach. It continues winding its northeast through remote woodlands for several kilometres, where it has intersections with both Highway 913 (where the pavement turns to gravel) and unsigned Highway 928 (Harding Road), as well as passing by White Gull Lake and crossing White Gull Creek. Now entering Narrow Hills Provincial Park, Highway 120 becomes paved once more just 1 kilometre (0.62 mi) before coming to and end at the junction between Highway 106 (Hanson Lake Road) and Highway 920.

== Major intersections ==
From south to north:

Rural municipality	Location	km	mi	Destinations	Notes
Garden River No. 490		0.0	0.0	Highway 55 (NWWR) – Nipawin, Prince Albert	Southern terminus
Garden River No. 490		0.1	0.062	Railway Avenue – Meath Park	
Paddockwood No. 520		7.8	4.8	Highway 791 west – Paddockwood	Eastern terminus of Highway 791
Paddockwood No. 520		23.3	14.5	Highway 926 north	Southern terminus of Highway 926
Paddockwood No. 520	Candle Lake	32.3	20.1	Highway 265 west – Candle Lake, Candle Lake Provincial Park	Eastern terminus of Highway 265
Paddockwood No. 520	Candle Lake	39.2	24.4	Main Street – Candle Lake	
Paddockwood No. 520	Candle Lake	42.3	26.3	Bridge over the Torch River	
Paddockwood No. 520	Candle Lake	42.9	26.7	Beach Avenue – Minowukaw Beach, Candle Lake Provincial Park	
Northern Saskatchewan Administration District		52.9	32.9	Highway 913 north – Clarence-Steepbank Lakes Provincial Park, Heritage Lake Recreation Site, Whiteswan Lake (Whelan Bay) Recreation Site, Piprell Lake Recreation Site, East Trout Lake	Southern terminus of Highway 913; southern end of unpaved section
Northern Saskatchewan Administration District		76.3	47.4	Bridge over White Gull Creek	
Northern Saskatchewan Administration District		76.6	47.6	Highway 928 east (Harding Road)	Western terminus of Highway 928; Highway 928 is unsigned
Northern Saskatchewan Administration District	Narrow Hills Provincial Park	89.7	55.7	Northern end of unpaved section	
Northern Saskatchewan Administration District	Narrow Hills Provincial Park	90.2	56.0	Highway 106 (Hanson Lake Road) – Creighton, Flin Flon, Smeaton; Highway 920 north – Lower Fishing Lake, Pine Ridge Resort	Northern terminus; southern terminus of Highway 920
1.000 mi = 1.609 km; 1.000 km = 0.621 mi

== See also ==
- Transportation in Saskatchewan
- Roads in Saskatchewan
