= Saskatchewan Highway 926 =

Provincial highway in Saskatchewan, Canada

Highway 926

Route information
- Maintained by Ministry of Highways and Infrastructure
- Length: 79 km (49 mi)

Major junctions
- South end: Highway 120 near Candle Lake
- Highway 265; Highway 970; Highway 931
- North end: Highway 969 near Montreal Lake

Location
- Country: Canada
- Province: Saskatchewan

Highway system
- Provincial highways in Saskatchewan
← Highway 925	→ Highway 927

Highway 926 is a provincial highway in the north-east region of the Canadian province of Saskatchewan. It runs from Highway 120 near Candle Lake to Highway 969. It is about 79 kilometres (49 mi) long.

Highway 926 also connects with Highway 265, Highway 970, and Highway 931.

== See also ==
- Roads in Saskatchewan
- Transportation in Saskatchewan
