= Saskatchewan Highway 940 =

Provincial highway in Saskatchewan, Canada

Highway 940

Route information
- Maintained by Ministry of Highways and Infrastructure
- Length: 5 km (3.1 mi)

Major junctions
- West end: Delaronde Lake
- East end: Highway 922 north of Bodmin

Location
- Country: Canada
- Province: Saskatchewan

Highway system
- Provincial highways in Saskatchewan
← Highway 939	→ Highway 941

Highway 940 is a provincial highway in the Canadian province of Saskatchewan. It runs from Highway 922 to a dead end near the eastern shore of Delaronde Lake. It is about 5 kilometres (3.1 mi) long.

== See also ==
- Roads in Saskatchewan
- Transportation in Saskatchewan
