= Nesslin Lake =

Lake in Saskatchewan, Canada

- Location in Saskatchewan Nesslin Lake (Canada)
- Location: RM of Big River No. 555, Saskatchewan
- Coordinates: 53.9501°N 106.7839°W
- Part of: Churchill River drainage basin
- Primary inflows: Tower Creek; Cabin Creek
- River sources: Waskesiu Upland
- Basin countries: Canada
- Max. width: 5 km (3.1 mi)
- Surface area: 576.2 ha (1,424 acres)
- Max. depth: 31.7 m (104 ft)
- Shore length^{1}: 15.72 km (9.77 mi)
- Surface elevation: 533 m (1,749 ft)
- Islands: Nesslin Island
- Settlements: Nesslin Lake
- ^{1} Shore length is not a well-defined measure.

Nesslin Lake is a lake in the Canadian province of Saskatchewan. It is situated at the western end of the Waskesiu Upland in the boreal forest ecozone of Canada. Nesslin Lake is within the Churchill River drainage basin of the Hudson Bay.

Nesslin Lake is near the western boundary of Prince Albert National Park and is entirely within the Nesslin Lake Provincial Recreation Site. It is about 21 kilometres (13 mi) north-east of the community of Big River. Access is from Nesslin Lake Road, which branches off Highway 922. The community of Nesslin Lake, at the southern end of the lake, is the only community at the lake.

In 2019, the lake water level rose significantly causing some flooding of amenities along the lakeshore. This was the result of a beaver dam being removed during the construction of a logging road north of the lake.

"The removal of a beaver dam resulted in a rapid release of water and sediment into a creek that flowed south into Nesslin Lake," Saskatchewan's Ministry of Environment said in a statement. "This altered the creek channel and caused the lake's water level to rise significantly in a short time, causing flooding and reduced water quality."

== Nesslin Lake Recreation Site ==
Nesslin Lake Recreation Site (53.9384°N 106.7745°W) is a 510-hectare (1,300-acre) provincial recreation site that encompasses the entirety of Nesslin Lake and is adjacent to the western boundary of Prince Albert National Park. The park has a campground with yurts, a sandy beach, boat launch, and a camp store with a confectionery. Park services are at the southern end of the lake near the community of Nesslin Lake and the neighbouring Swede Lake.

== Fish species ==
Fish commonly found in Nesslin Lake include lake trout, walleye, burbot, yellow perch, lake whitefish, white sucker, and northern pike.

== See also ==
- List of lakes of Saskatchewan
- Tourism in Saskatchewan
- Ness Lakes
- Nesset Lake
