= Saskatchewan Highway 916 =

Provincial highway in Saskatchewan, Canada

Highway 916

Route information
- Maintained by Ministry of Highways and Infrastructure
- Length: 112 km (70 mi)

Major junctions
- South end: Highway 2 north of Montreal Lake
- North end: Highway 924 near Sled Lake

Location
- Country: Canada
- Province: Saskatchewan

Highway system
- Provincial highways in Saskatchewan
| ← Highway 915 | → Highway 917 |

Highway 916 is a provincial highway in the north-west region of the Canadian province of Saskatchewan. It runs from the CanAm Highway (Highway 2) west to Highway 924 near Sled Lake. The highway connects with Highways 922, 917, 929, 921, and 939. It is about 112 kilometres (70 mi) long.

== Provincial recreation sites ==
Highway 916 provides access to two provincial recreation sites, including Elaine Lake and Camp 10 Lake. The Camp 10 Lake Recreation Site (54.2562°N 105.9595°W) is located near the eastern terminus of Highway 916 on the southern shore of the 6-hectare (15-acre) Camp 10 Lake. The 51-hectare (130-acre) park has a picnic area and access to the lake for fishing.

== See also ==
- Roads in Saskatchewan
- Transportation in Saskatchewan
