= Nesslin Lake, Saskatchewan =

Hamlet in Saskatchewan, Canada

Coordinates: 53°55′56″N 106°47′13″W

Nesslin Lake is a hamlet in the Canadian province of Saskatchewan. It is situated between the southern shore of Nesslin Lake and northern shore of Swede Lake in the Rural Municipality of Big River No. 555. Access is from Nesslin Lake Road, which branches off Highway 922.

== Demographics ==
In the 2021 Census of Population conducted by Statistics Canada, Nesslin Lake had a population of 15 living in 8 of its 22 total private dwellings, a change of 200% from its 2016 population of 5. With a land area of 0.11 km^{2} (0.042 sq mi), it had a population density of 136.4/km^{2} (353.2/sq mi) in 2021.

== See also ==
- List of communities in Saskatchewan
