= Big River (Saskatchewan) =

River in Saskatchewan, Canada

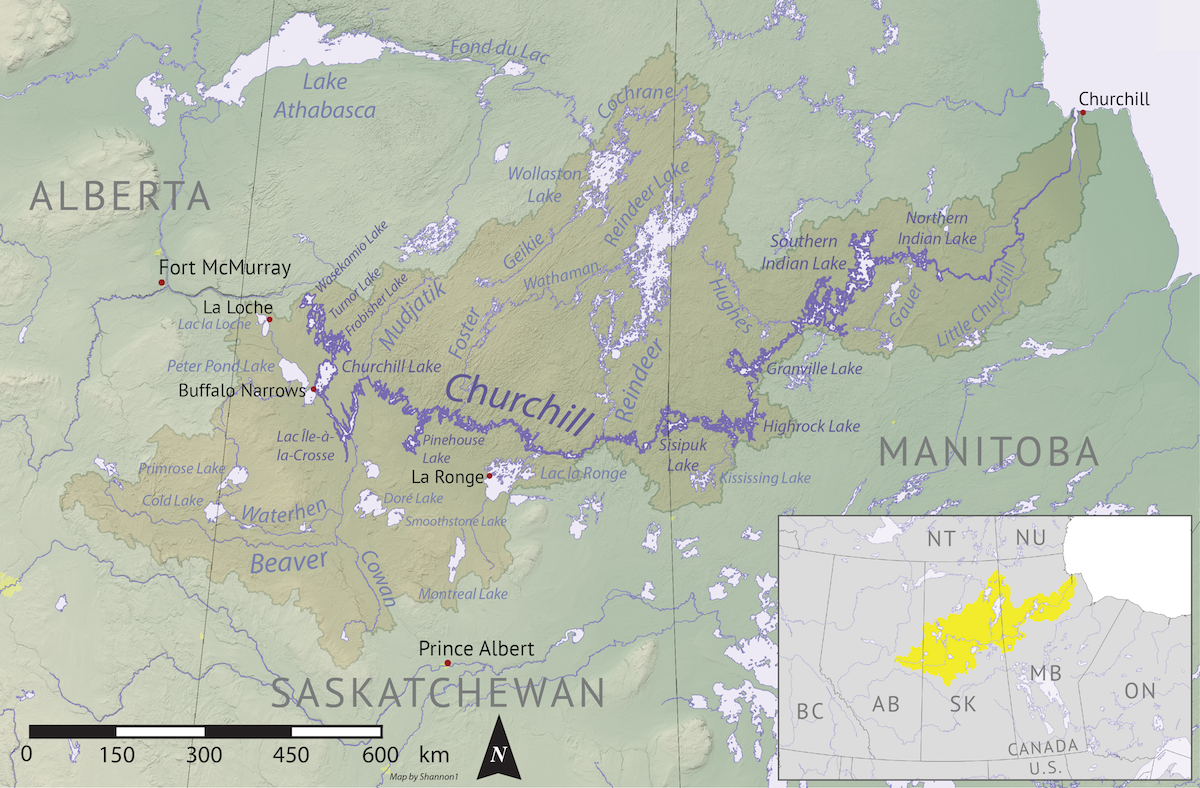
- Churchill River drainage basin

- Location of the mouth in Saskatchewan Big River (Saskatchewan) (Canada)

Location
- Country: Canada
- Provinces: Saskatchewan

Physical characteristics
- Source: Witchekan Lake
  - location: RM of Spiritwood No. 496
  - coordinates: 53.4962°N 107.5827°W
  - elevation: 580 m (1,900 ft)
- Mouth: Cowan Lake
  - location: RM of Big River No. 555
  - coordinates: 53.8334°N 107.0339°W
  - elevation: 483 m (1,585 ft)

Basin features
- River system: Beaver River drainage basin

Big River is a river in the west-central part of the Canadian province of Saskatchewan in the boreal forest ecozone of Canada. The river begins at Witchekan Lake in the RM of Spiritwood No. 496 and heads in a north-easterly direction before emptying into Cowan Lake at the town of Big River. Cowan Lake is the source for Cowan River, which is a major tributary of Beaver River. Beaver River then flows into Lac Île-à-la-Crosse and the Churchill River.

== Course ==
Big River's source, Witchekan Lake and its tributaries, are the southernmost point in the Churchill River's watershed. The lake's notable tributaries include Shuwapss Creek, Norbury Creek, and Idylwild Creek. The town of Spiritwood is at the southern end of the lake and the Witchekan Lake Indian Reserve covers much of the western shore. Big River exits Witchekan Lake at the northern end and heads in an easterly direction crossing Highway 24 then travels in a deep-cut valley through the Leoville Hills before emptying into Keg Lake. Highway 793 follows the river's course through much of the Leoville Hills. From Keg Lake, the landscape flattens out and Big River carries on north into the southern end of Cowan Lake at the town of Big River. Highway 55 follows the river from about Keg Lake to Cowan Lake.

== See also ==
- List of rivers of Saskatchewan
- Hudson Bay drainage basin
