= Phillips Grove =

Community in Saskatchewan, Canada

Coordinates: 53°52′17″N 106°55′59″W

Phillips Grove is a hamlet in the Canadian province of Saskatchewan. It is at the southern end of Delaronde Lake in the Rural Municipality of Big River No. 555. Access is from Highway 922.

== Demographics ==
In the 2021 Census of Population conducted by Statistics Canada, Phillips Grove had a population of 15 living in 9 of its 37 total private dwellings, a change of 0% from its 2016 population of 15. With a land area of 0.31 km^{2} (0.12 sq mi), it had a population density of 48.4/km^{2} (125.3/sq mi) in 2021.
