= Rural Municipality of Paddockwood No. 520 =

Rural municipality in Saskatchewan, Canada

Paddockwood No. 520
- Rural municipality
- Rural Municipality of Paddockwood No. 520
- Location of the RM of Paddockwood No. 520 in Saskatchewan
- Coordinates: 53.734°N 105.452°W
- Country: Canada
- Province: Saskatchewan
- Census division: 15
- SARM division: 5
- Formed: January 1, 1978

Government
  - Reeve: Leander (Lance) Fehr
  - Governing body: RM of Paddockwood No. 520 Council
  - Administrator: Naomi Hrischuk
  - Office location: Paddockwood

Area (2016)
  - Land: 2,456.56 km^{2} (948.48 sq mi)

Population (2016)
  - Total: 895
  - Density: 0.4/km^{2} (1.0/sq mi)
- Time zone: CST
  - Summer (DST): CST
- Area codes: 306 and 639
- Website: Official website

The Rural Municipality of Paddockwood No. 520 (2016 population: 895) is a rural municipality (RM) in the Canadian province of Saskatchewan within Census Division No. 15 and SARM Division No. 5.

== History ==
The RM of Paddockwood No. 520 incorporated as a rural municipality on January 1, 1978.

== Geography ==
=== Communities and localities ===
The following urban municipalities are surrounded by the RM.

Villages

- Paddockwood

Resort villages

- Candle Lake

The following unincorporated communities are within the RM.

Organized hamlets

- Northside

Localities

- Forest Gate
- Foxford
- Glendale Park
- Lakeside Beach
- Minowukaw Beach
- Telwin
- Torch Lake
- Waskateena Beach

== Demographics ==
Population history (1981–2016)
Year	Pop.	±%
1981	1,110	—
1986	1,117	+0.6%
1991	1,053	−5.7%
1996	1,062	+0.9%
2001	1,065	+0.3%
2006	976	−8.4%
2011	966	−1.0%
2016	895	−7.3%
Source: Statistics Canada via Saskatchewan Bureau of Statistics

In the 2021 Census of Population conducted by Statistics Canada, the RM of Paddockwood No. 520 had a population of 1,071 living in 455 of its 623 total private dwellings, a change of 19% from its 2016 population of 900. With a land area of 2,450.94 km^{2} (946.31 sq mi), it had a population density of 0.4/km^{2} (1.1/sq mi) in 2021.

In the 2016 Census of Population, the RM of Paddockwood No. 520 recorded a population of 895 living in 382 of its 479 total private dwellings, a −8.1% change from its 2011 population of 974. With a land area of 2,456.56 km^{2} (948.48 sq mi), it had a population density of 0.4/km^{2} (0.9/sq mi) in 2016.

== Attractions ==
- Candle Lake Provincial Park
- Heritage Lake Recreation Site

== Government ==
The RM of Paddockwood No. 520 is governed by an elected municipal council and an appointed administrator that meets on the third Wednesday of every month. The reeve of the RM is Leander (Lance) Fehr while its administrator is Naomi Hrischuk. The RM's office is located in Paddockwood.

== Transportation ==
- Saskatchewan Highway 2
- Saskatchewan Highway 120
- Saskatchewan Highway 265
- Saskatchewan Highway 791
- Saskatchewan Highway 926
- Saskatchewan Highway 970

== See also ==
- List of rural municipalities in Saskatchewan
