= Ski Timber Ridge =

Ski area in Saskatchewan, Canada

- Location within Saskatchewan Location within Canada
- Location: RM of Big River No. 555, Saskatchewan, Canada
- Nearest city: Saskatoon
- Coordinates: 53.7854°N 106.9862°W
- Vertical: 90 m (300 ft)
- Skiable area: 18 ha (44 acres)
- Trails: 6
- Longest run: 800 m (2,600 ft)
- Lift system: T-bar, rope tow
- Snowfall: 2 m (6 ft 7 in)
- Snowmaking: yes
- Website: Ski Timber Ridge Facebook

Ski Timber Ridge is a ski area in the Canadian province of Saskatchewan. It is in the Rural Municipality of Big River No. 555, 3 kilometres (1.9 mi) south of Big River. Saskatoon, Saskatchewan's largest city, is about 2 1/2 hours to the south. Access is from Highway 55.

Ski Timber Ridge is a small ski area at only 18 hectares (44 acres). There are six runs, the longest of which is 800 metres (2,600 ft), and a snowboarding park. The runs are groomed and snow is made as needed. Lifts include a T-bar and rope tow.

== See also ==
- List of ski areas and resorts in Canada
- Tourism in Saskatchewan
