= Saskatchewan Highway 938 =

Provincial highway in Saskatchewan, Canada

Highway 938

Route information
- Maintained by Ministry of Highways and Infrastructure
- Length: 7 km (4.3 mi)

Major junctions
- South end: Highway 921
- North end: Randall Lake

Location
- Country: Canada
- Province: Saskatchewan

Highway system
- Provincial highways in Saskatchewan
← Highway 937	→ Highway 939

Highway 938 is a provincial highway in the Canadian province of Saskatchewan. It runs from Highway 917 to a dead end. It is about 7 kilometres (4.3 mi) long.

== See also ==
- Roads in Saskatchewan
- Transportation in Saskatchewan
