= Lavallée Lake =

Lake in Saskatchewan, Canada

- Location in Saskatchewan Lavallée Lake (Canada)
- Location: Prince Albert National Park, Saskatchewan
- Coordinates: 54.3033°N 106.5616°W
- Part of: Churchill River drainage basin
- Primary inflows: Smoothstone River
- River sources: Waskesiu Upland
- Primary outflows: Smoothstone River
- Basin countries: Canada
- Surface elevation: 543 m (1,781 ft)
- Islands: Heron Island
- Settlements: None

Lavallée Lake is a lake in the Canadian province of Saskatchewan. It is in an Important Bird Area (IBA) of Canada designated as Lavallee Lake (SK 004) and is the site of the second largest breeding colony of white pelicans in Canada. It is in an access-controlled area at the northern boundary of Prince Albert National Park. It is a Class I Special Protection Zone, the only such zone that fully protects a white pelican colony in Canada.

The lake is in the Waskesiu Upland along the course of the Smoothstone River. The Smoothstone River flows north into Pinehouse Lake, which is along the course of the Churchill River.

== See also ==
- List of lakes of Saskatchewan
- List of protected areas of Saskatchewan
