= Saskatchewan Highway 930 =

Former provincial highway in Saskatchewan, Canada

Highway 930

Route information
- Maintained by Ministry of Highways and Infrastructure
- Length: 14 km (8.7 mi)
- History: Replaced by Hwy 969

Major junctions
- West end: Highway 2 near Montreal Lake
- East end: Highway 969 at Montreal Lake

Location
- Country: Canada
- Province: Saskatchewan

Highway system
- Provincial highways in Saskatchewan
← Highway 929	→ Highway 931

Highway 930 was a provincial highway in the Canadian province of Saskatchewan. The Highway ran from Highway 2 to Highway 969 through the Waskesiu River Recreation Site and the town of Montreal Lake. It was approximately 14 kilometres (8.7 mi) long.

Highway 969 previously followed Candle Lake Road south of Montreal Lake; however, when the road was decommissioned from the provincial highway system, Highway 930 was integrated into Highway 969.

== See also ==
- Roads in Saskatchewan
- Transportation in Saskatchewan
