= Saskatchewan Highway 924 =

Provincial highway in Saskatchewan, Canada

Highway 924

Route information
- Maintained by Ministry of Highways and Infrastructure
- Length: 64 km (40 mi)
- History: Formerly Hwy 124

Major junctions
- South end: Highway 55 near Cowan Lake
- Highway 916 near Sled Lake
- North end: Dore Lake

Location
- Country: Canada
- Province: Saskatchewan

Highway system
- Provincial highways in Saskatchewan
← Highway 923	→ Highway 925

Highway 924, also known as Elaine Lake Road, is a provincial highway in the north-west region of the Canadian province of Saskatchewan. It runs from Highway 55 near Cowan Dam Recreation Site at the source of the Cowan River to the community of Dore Lake on Doré Lake. The highway connects with Highway 916. It is about 64 kilometres (40 mi) long.

Highway 924 was originally designated as Highway 124, but was renumbered in the early 1980s as part of the establishment of the 900-series highways.

== Communities and recreation ==
Highway 924 provides access to the communities of Dore Lake and Sled Lake, as well as the provincial recreation sites of Dore Lake (Michel Point), Beaupré Creek, and Shirley Lake. Lakes accessed from the highway include Doré Lake, Beaupré Lake, Shirley Lake, Sled Lake, and Cowan Lake.

Shirley Lake Recreation Site (54.4881°N 107.2521°W) is accessed from a short road off of Highway 924. It is a small park with a boat launch on the southern shore of Shirley Lake. Shirley Lake is a small but deep lake. It is 46.52 hectares (115.0 acres) in size with a depth of 18.4 metres (60 ft).

== See also ==
- Roads in Saskatchewan
- Transportation in Saskatchewan
