= Saskatchewan Highway 939 =

Provincial highway in Saskatchewan, Canada

Highway 939

Route information
- Maintained by Ministry of Highways and Infrastructure
- Length: 38 km (24 mi)

Major junctions
- South end: Highway 916
- North end: Highway 921 / Highway 937

Location
- Country: Canada
- Province: Saskatchewan

Highway system
- Provincial highways in Saskatchewan
← Highway 938	→ Highway 940

Highway 939 is a provincial highway in the north-west region of the Canadian province of Saskatchewan. It runs from Highway 916 near the western shore of Weyakwin Lake to a dead end near Highway 921 / Highway 937. It is about 38 kilometres (24 mi) long.

== See also ==
- Roads in Saskatchewan
- Transportation in Saskatchewan
