= Saskatchewan Highway 968 =

Provincial highway in Saskatchewan, Canada

Highway 968

Route information
- Maintained by Ministry of Highways and Infrastructure
- Length: 2 km (1.2 mi)

Major junctions
- South end: Fond-du-Lac, on Lake Athabasca
- North end: Dead end, Fond du Lac 227

Location
- Country: Canada
- Province: Saskatchewan
- Rural municipalities: Northern Saskatchewan Administration District

Highway system
- Provincial highways in Saskatchewan
← Highway 967	→ Highway 969

Highway 968 is a provincial highway in the far north region of the Canadian province of Saskatchewan. It serves local traffic around the northern town of Fond-du-Lac and the Fond du Lac Denesuline First Nation. It is about 2 kilometres (1.2 mi) long and is not connected to any other highways except by a seasonal winter road.

== See also ==
- Roads in Saskatchewan
- Transportation in Saskatchewan
