= Saskatchewan Highway 922 =

Provincial highway in Saskatchewan, Canada

Highway 922

Route information
- Maintained by Ministry of Highways and Infrastructure
- Length: 93 km (58 mi)

Major junctions
- South end: Highway 55 near Bodmin
- Highway 923
- North end: Highway 916 east of Sled Lake

Location
- Country: Canada
- Province: Saskatchewan

Highway system
- Provincial highways in Saskatchewan
| ← Highway 921 | → Highway 923 |

Highway 922 is a provincial highway in the north-west region of the Canadian province of Saskatchewan. It runs from Highway 55 at Bodmin north to Highway 916. It is about 93 kilometres (58 mi) long.

Highway 922 provides access to the amenities at Delaronde Lake and provincial recreation sites such as Zig Zag Bay Campground, Ness Lake Recreation Site, and Nesslin Lake Recreation Site. It also connects with Highway 940 and Highway 923.

== See also ==
- Roads in Saskatchewan
- Transportation in Saskatchewan
