= Weirdale =

Village in Saskatchewan, Canada

Coordinates: 53°26′56″N 105°14′22″W

Weirdale (2016 population: 50) is a village in the Canadian province of Saskatchewan within the Rural Municipality of Garden River No. 490 and Census Division No. 15. Weirdale is about 48 kilometres (30 mi) northeast of the city of Prince Albert along Highway 55.

== History ==
Weirdale was founded between 1929 and 1931 when the Canadian Pacific Railway opened a new frontier on the Canadian Prairies. When the pioneers arrived in the area, they cleared out the thick forest and muskeg by hand creating rich farmland. The pioneers had large families that lived on every quarter of farmland. In turn, these large families brought the population to the area. In the early part of 20th century, transportation was much slower than it is today so it was much more difficult to travel long distances. Because of the difficulties in travelling, many small communities had to become self-sustaining in order to survive. At one point, Weirdale housed a hospital, school, flour mill, puffed wheat factory, and a lumber yard as well as numerous other small business that sustained the community. As transportation advanced and became more efficient, which was aided by the construction of modern highways, small villages across the prairies began to die economically.

Weirdale incorporated as a village on April 1, 1948.

== Demographics ==
Population history (1981–2016)
Year	Pop.	±%
1981	90	—
1986	90	+0.0%
1991	72	−20.0%
1996	63	−12.5%
2001	90	+42.9%
2006	83	−7.8%
2011	75	−9.6%
2016	50	−33.3%
Source: Statistics Canada via Saskatchewan Bureau of Statistics

In the 2021 Census of Population conducted by Statistics Canada, Weirdale had a population of 55 living in 28 of its 33 total private dwellings, a change of 10% from its 2016 population of 50. With a land area of 1.2 km^{2} (0.46 sq mi), it had a population density of 45.8/km^{2} (118.7/sq mi) in 2021.

In the 2016 Census of Population, the Village of Weirdale recorded a population of 50 living in 23 of its 27 total private dwellings, a −50% change from its 2011 population of 75. With a land area of 1.36 km^{2} (0.53 sq mi), it had a population density of 36.8/km^{2} (95.2/sq mi) in 2016.

== See also ==
- List of communities in Saskatchewan
