= Saskatchewan Highway 271 =

Provincial highway in Saskatchewan, Canada

Highway 271

Route information
- Maintained by Ministry of Highways and Infrastructure
- Length: 53.8 km (33.4 mi)

Major junctions
- West end: Fort Walsh
- East end: Highway 21 / Highway 724 in Maple Creek

Location
- Country: Canada
- Province: Saskatchewan
- Rural municipalities: Maple Creek

Highway system
- Provincial highways in Saskatchewan
← Highway 265	→ Highway 301

Highway 271 is a provincial highway in the Canadian province of Saskatchewan. Saskatchewan's 200-series highways primarily service its recreational areas. The highway runs from Highway 21 in Maple Creek to Fort Walsh National Historic Site, located within the western block of Cypress Hills Interprovincial Park. It connects with Highways 724 and 615 and is about 54 kilometres (34 mi) long.

== Route description ==
Hwy 271 begins within Cypress Hills Interprovincial Park at the main parking lot for the Fort Walsh National Historic Site, heading northeast for a few kilometres before making a sharp right at an intersection with Ranger Station Road. The highway now winds its way down a mountain pass out of the Cypress Hills via sharp switchbacks, leaving the park and making a left at the junction with Hwy 615. It heads northeast through remote prairie lands for the next several kilometres, crossing a few small creeks before becoming concurrent (overlapped) with eastbound Hwy 724, with the pair heading due east to enter the town of Maple Creek along 5th Avenue, with Hwy 271 coming to an end at the junction with Hwy 21 just past the local hospital, with Hwy 724 continuing east through neighbourhoods along 5th Avenue. The entire length of Hwy 271 is a paved, two-lane highway, and is located within the Rural Municipality of Maple Creek No. 111.

== Major intersections ==
Rural municipality	Location	km	mi	Destinations	Notes
Maple Creek No. 111	Cypress Hills Interprovincial Park	0.0	0.0	Fort Walsh National Historic Site parking lot	Begin provincial maintenance; western terminus
Maple Creek No. 111	Cypress Hills Interprovincial Park	4.5	2.8	Ranger Station Road – Elkwater	
Maple Creek No. 111		10.5	6.5	Highway 615 south – Senate, Consul	Northern terminus of Hwy 615
Maple Creek No. 111		12.2	7.6	Gap Road – Cypress Hills Provincial Park Centre Block	
Maple Creek No. 111		50.2	31.2	Highway 724 west	Southern end of Hwy 724 concurrency
Maple Creek No. 111	Maple Creek	53.8	33.4	Highway 21 to Highway 1 (TCH) – Cypress Hills Interprovincial Park Centre Block Highway 724 east (5th Avenue) – Maple Creek	Eastern terminus; road continues east as Hwy 724
1.000 mi = 1.609 km; 1.000 km = 0.621 mi: Concurrency terminus

== See also ==
- Transportation in Saskatchewan
- Roads in Saskatchewan
