= Beaupré Lake =

Lake in Saskatchewan, Canada

- Location in Saskatchewan Beaupré Lake (Canada)
- Location: Northern Administration District, Saskatchewan
- Coordinates: 54.5334°N 107.1673°W
- Part of: Churchill River drainage basin
- Primary inflows: Mirasty River
- Primary outflows: Beaupré Creek
- Basin countries: Canada
- Surface elevation: 465 m (1,526 ft)
- Settlements: None

Beaupré Lake is a lake in the Canadian province of Saskatchewan. It is located in Saskatchewan's Northern Administration District in the Boreal Shield Ecozone of Canada. Access to the lake is from Highway 924.

== Description ==
Beaupré Lake is situated in boreal forest surrounded by glacier-carved hills and muskeg. Several small creeks feed into the lake with the primary inflow being the Mirasty River, which originates at Mirasty Lake. Beaupré Creek, located at Christie Bay at the lake's western end, is the outflow. Beaupré Creek flows west from Beaupré Lake and into Sled Lake. Sled Lake is connected to Doré Lake via the Doré River. Beaupré Lake is in the Beaver River drainage basin.

== Beaupré Creek Recreation Site ==
Beaupré Creek Recreation Site (54.5308°N 107.2702°W) is a provincial recreation site located at the start of Beaupré Creek on the lake's western shore. The 20-hectare (49-acre) park was founded in 1986 and has a picnic area and access to Beaupré Lake. Adjacent to the park along the creek is a resort called Beaupre Creek Lodge & Cabins. Access is from Highway 924.

== See also ==
- List of lakes of Saskatchewan
- Tourism in Saskatchewan
