= Saskatchewan Highway 928 =

Provincial highway in Saskatchewan, Canada

Highway 928

Route information
- Maintained by Ministry of Highways and Infrastructure
- Length: 10.0 km (6.2 mi)

Major junctions
- West end: Highway 120 near Narrow Hills Provincial Park
- Highway 106
- East end: Harding Road near Narrow Hills Provincial Park

Location
- Country: Canada
- Province: Saskatchewan

Highway system
- Provincial highways in Saskatchewan
← Highway 927	→ Highway 929

Highway 928 is a provincial highway in the north-east region of the Canadian province of Saskatchewan. It runs from Highway 120 to Harding Road near the Narrow Hills Provincial Park. It is about 10 kilometres (6.2 mi) long.

== See also ==
- Roads in Saskatchewan
- Transportation in Saskatchewan
