= Smoothstone Lake =

Lake in Saskatchewan, Canada

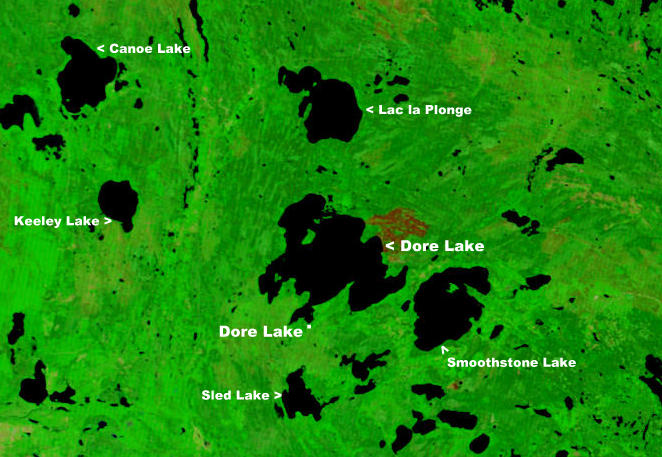
- NASA image of Smoothstone and surrounding lakes

- Location in Saskatchewan Smoothstone Lake (Canada)
- Location: Northern Administration District, Saskatchewan
- Coordinates: 54.6667°N 106.8339°W
- Part of: Churchill River drainage basin
- Primary inflows: Smoothstone River
- River sources: Waskesiu Upland
- Primary outflows: Smoothstone River
- Basin countries: Canada
- Surface area: 27,907 ha (68,960 acres)
- Max. depth: 27 m (89 ft)
- Shore length^{1}: 96 km (60 mi)
- Surface elevation: 474 m (1,555 ft)
- Islands: Shelter Island
- Settlements: None
- ^{1} Shore length is not a well-defined measure.

Smoothstone Lake is a lake in the Canadian province of Saskatchewan along the course of the Smoothstone River. The lake is at the western edge of the Waskesiu Upland in the Mid-Boreal Upland ecozone of Canada and is surrounded by boreal forests. Smoothstone Lake's primary inflow and outflow is the Smoothstone River, which begins in the Waskesiu Upland and ends at Pinehouse Lake of the Churchill River. At the lake's northern end is Selenite Point, Selenite Bay, and the 362.2-hectare (895-acre) Shelter Island. Access to the lake and its amenities is from Highway 917. Highway 929 dead ends near Selenite Bay at the lake's northern end.

== Recreation ==
Smoothstone Lake has a provincial recreation site and an outfitter on its shores. Smoothstone Lake Recreation Site (54.5926°N 106.9588°W) is a conservation area situated at the southern end of the lake for fishing and other recreational opportunities. Access is from Charbonneau Road, which branches off Highway 917.

Smoothstone Lake Lodge is at a sandy beach on the western shore of Smoothstone Lake and is open year-round. Activities include hunting for white-tailed deer and bears, snowmobiling, and fishing. There are boat, canoe, and kayak rentals available. It has accommodations in the 2,300 sq. ft. lodge as well as in individual cabins. Access is from Highway 917.

== Fish species ==
Fish commonly found in Smoothstone Lake include northern pike, walleye, burbot, cisco, lake whitefish, longnose sucker, white sucker, and yellow perch.

== See also ==
- List of lakes of Saskatchewan
