= Candle Lake (Saskatchewan) =

Lake in Saskatchewan, Canada

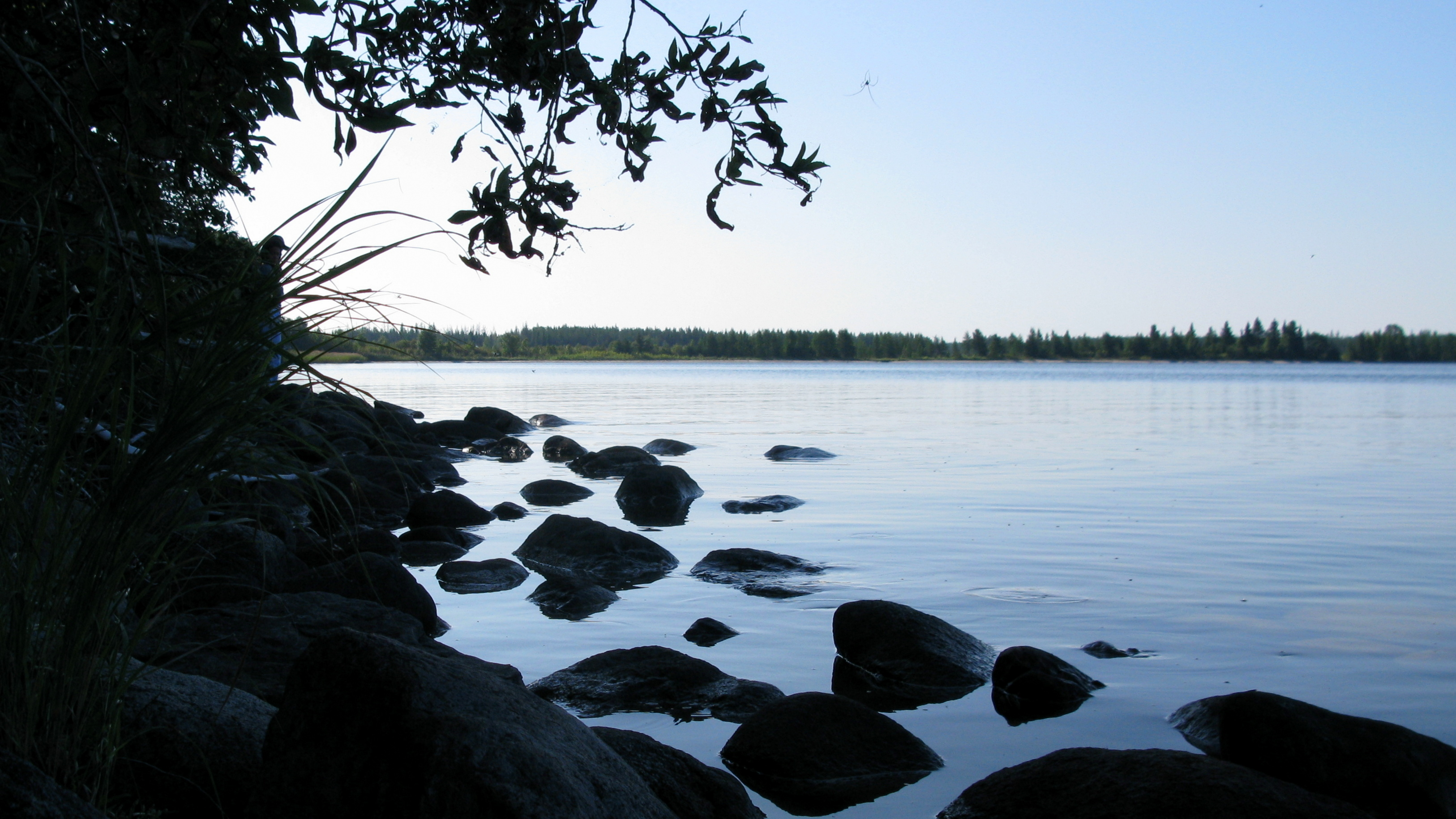
- Candle Lake

- Location in Saskatchewan Candle Lake (Canada)
- Location: Paddockwood No. 520, Saskatchewan
- Coordinates: 53°49′13.86″N 105°18′15.47″W
- Type: Reservoir
- Part of: Saskatchewan River drainage basin
- Primary inflows: Fisher Creek; Clearsand Creek; Hanin Creek
- Primary outflows: Torch River
- Basin countries: Canada
- Managing agency: Saskatchewan Water Security Agency
- Surface area: 13,269.3 ha (32,789 acres)
- Max. depth: 16.8 m (55 ft)
- Shore length^{1}: 116.2 km (72.2 mi)
- Surface elevation: 491 m (1,611 ft)
- Settlements: Candle Lake
- ^{1} Shore length is not a well-defined measure.

Candle Lake is a reservoir in the central part of the Canadian province of Saskatchewan in the boreal forest, approximately 80 kilometres (50 mi) north-east of Prince Albert. A dam completed in 1979 at the southern end of the lake regulates water levels; several small creeks feed into the lake and Torch River flows out of the lake at the dam. Candle Lake Provincial Park surrounds most of the lake and the resort village of Candle Lake is at the southern end.

The lake takes its name from a Cree legend about flickering lights appearing near the north end of the lake, which have supposedly been seen right up to contemporary times. Scientists speculate that the lights are likely caused from "swamp gas or a phosphorescent glow created by decaying drift wood", rather than having a paranormal origin.

Highways 265 and 120 provide access to the lake and its amenities. Candle Lake Airpark is located on the western shore of the lake 2.6 nautical miles (4.8 km; 3.0 mi) west-northwest of the village of Candle Lake.

== History ==
From circa 1887 to around 1889, the Hudson's Bay Company operated a fur trade post on the Lake as an outpost of Fort a la Corne.

== Parks and recreation ==
Candle Lake is a popular tourist destination in Western Canada as most of the lake is surrounded by Candle Lake Provincial Park. Along the lake's shores there are several natural sand beaches including Minowukaw Beach, Waskateena Beach, Candle Lake Beach, and the Purple Sands Beach.

The Purple Sands Beach has vibrantly striped bands of sand in purple, magenta, and pink hues. The purple sand comes from garnet that was brought to the region from the Canadian Shield by glaciation during the ice age about 12,000 years ago. Adjacent to Minowukaw Beach are the Minowukaw Sand Dunes. Amenities and activities in and around the lake include sport fishing and other water sports, camping, golfing, hiking, fishing, and boating. At Candle Lake Beach on Berezowsky Bay, Sask Aquatic Adventures has a water adventure park set up. Several marinas are dotted around the lake's shore providing boating access to the lake.

== Candle Lake Dam ==
The level in Candle Lake is regulated by a four-bay 3.1 m (10 ft) high concrete dam, constructed in 1978–1979 and operated by the Saskatchewan Watershed Authority. It is located at the south-eastern corner of the lake at Hanson Bay and it discharges into the Torch River.

The construction of the dam prevented the normal spawning movement of fish each spring between the Torch River and Candle Lake. In 2002, the Minowukaw Fishway was constructed to better allow fish to travel between the lake and the river.

== Fish species ==
Fish commonly found in the lake include walleye, northern pike, lake whitefish, white sucker, shorthead redhorse, longnose sucker, and burbot.

== See also ==
- Saskatchewan Water Security Agency
- List of dams and reservoirs in Canada
- List of lakes of Saskatchewan
- Tourism in Saskatchewan
