= Heritage Lake (Saskatchewan) =

Lake in Saskatchewan, Canada

- Location in Saskatchewan Heritage Lake (Canada)
- Location: RM of Paddockwood No. 520, Saskatchewan
- Coordinates: 53.9334°N 105.1505°W
- Part of: Saskatchewan River drainage basin
- Primary outflows: Gull Creek
- Basin countries: Canada
- Max. depth: 15 m (49 ft)
- Shore length^{1}: 9 km (5.6 mi)
- Surface elevation: 552 m (1,811 ft)
- Settlements: None
- ^{1} Shore length is not a well-defined measure.

Heritage Lake is a lake in the Canadian province of Saskatchewan in the RM of Paddockwood No. 520. Its outflow, Gull Creek, is a tributary of the Torch River. Along the lake's shores is a provincial recreation site, Bible camp, and a Girl Guides camp. Access to the lake and its amenities is from Highway 913. The village of Candle Lake is 18 kilometres (11 mi) to the south-southwest and the city of Prince Albert is 87 kilometres (54 mi) to the south-southwest.

== Heritage Lake Recreation Site ==
Heritage Lake Recreation Site (53.9301°N 105.1438°W) is a provincial recreation site on the eastern shore of Heritage Lake. The park has a campground, dock, and a beach area.

== Fish species ==
Fish commonly found in Heritage Lake include northern pike, walleye, and white sucker.

== See also ==
- List of lakes of Saskatchewan
- Tourism in Saskatchewan
