= Saskatchewan Highway 917 =

Provincial highway in Saskatchewan, Canada

Highway 917

Route information
- Maintained by Ministry of Highways and Infrastructure
- Length: 25 km (16 mi)

Major junctions
- South end: Highway 916 near Smoothstone Lake
- North end: Doré Lake

Location
- Country: Canada
- Province: Saskatchewan

Highway system
- Provincial highways in Saskatchewan
← Highway 916	→ Highway 918

Highway 917 is a provincial highway in the north-west region of the Canadian province of Saskatchewan. It runs from Highway 916 to a dead end near Doré Lake. It is about 25 kilometres (16 mi) long.

About 2 kilometres (1.2 mi) north of the junction with Highway 916, Charbonneau Road connects Highway 917 to Smoothstone Lake Recreation Site. And about 3 kilometres (1.9 mi) from Charbonneau Road, Highway 938 branches off 917.

== See also ==
- Roads in Saskatchewan
- Transportation in Saskatchewan
