= Candle Lake Provincial Park =

Provincial park in Saskatchewan, Canada

- Location within Saskatchewan Location within Canada
- Location: Saskatchewan, Canada
- Nearest city: Candle Lake
- Coordinates: 53.8016°N 105.3317°W
- Area: 7,874 ha (19,460 acres)
- Established: 1986
- Governing body: Sask Parks

Candle Lake Provincial Park is a provincial park in the central region of the Canadian province of Saskatchewan. Prior to the park's establishment in 1986, it was a provincial recreation site. Located in the Rural Municipality of Paddockwood No. 520, Candle Lake Provincial Park surrounds most of Candle and Torch Lakes in the boreal forest ecozone of Canada. The park has a variety of activities including camping, boating, fishing, swimming, mini golfing, hiking (with about 15 km (9.3 mi) of trails), and golfing. Around the lake there are also boat launches and several marinas. Natural attractions include a purple sand beach, sand dunes, mature forests, crystal clear lake water, and several natural sand beaches.

Highways 265 and 120 and Candle Lake Airpark provide access to the park. The resort village of Candle Lake is located adjacent to the park at the southern end of Candle Lake and the nearest city is Prince Albert, approximately 80 kilometres (50 mi) to the south-west.

== Accommodations ==
There are about 300 campsites between the two campgrounds. Minowukaw Campground is on the eastern shore of Candle Lake at Minowukaw Beach and it offers electric hook-ups, running water, and washrooms. It is split into three sections, A, B, and group camping. Sandy Bay Campground is on the western side of the lake at Sandy Bay Beach on Berezowsky Bay. It too is divided into A, B, and group camping with electrical hook-ups, running water, and washrooms / showers.

In addition to campgrounds, there are several resorts and cabin rentals in the park and the village of Candle Lake. Some of them include Minowukaw Lodge & Joe's Cabins Resort by Minowukaw Beach, K & R Cabins at the west end of the village on Torch Lake, Camp Tawow on the southern shore of Candle Lake east of the village, and Camp Tapawingo also on the southern shore.

== Beaches and dunes ==
Along the lake's shores, there are several beaches with natural sand. On the south-eastern shore at Minowukaw Beach, it's a natural sand environment and just inland from the beach are the Minowukaw Sand Dunes. Boardwalk paths have been built through the dunes for public access. Purple Sands Beach is located at the north-eastern shore of the lake. The beach has vibrantly striped bands of sand in purple, magenta, and pink hues. The purple sand comes from garnet that was brought to the region from the Canadian Shield by glaciation during the ice age about 12,000 years ago. Other beaches include Sandy Bay Beach and Waskateena Beach.

== Golf ==
At the southern end of the lake, just east of the village, is Candle Lake Golf Resort. It is a par 72, 18-hole, grass greens course that was built in 1977. There are three tee-offs at each hole with the blue totalling 6,543 yards, white 5,855 yards, and red 5,067 yards. There is also a pro shop, restaurant, and cabin rentals.

== See also ==
- List of protected areas of Saskatchewan
- Geography of Saskatchewan
- Tourism in Saskatchewan
