= Saskatchewan Highway 923 =

Provincial highway in Saskatchewan, Canada

Highway 923

Route information
- Maintained by Ministry of Highways and Infrastructure
- Length: 17 km (11 mi)

Major junctions
- South end: Highway 922
- North end: Listen Lake

Location
- Country: Canada
- Province: Saskatchewan

Highway system
- Provincial highways in Saskatchewan
← Highway 922	→ Highway 924

Highway 923 is a provincial highway in the Canadian province of Saskatchewan. It runs from Highway 922 to a dead end near Listen Lake. It is about 17 kilometres (11 mi) long.

== See also ==
- Roads in Saskatchewan
- Transportation in Saskatchewan
