= Saskatchewan Highway 935 =

Provincial highway in Saskatchewan, Canada

Highway 935

Route information
- Maintained by Ministry of Highways and Infrastructure
- Length: 8 km (5.0 mi)

Major junctions
- South end: Highway 165
- North end: Morin Lake 217 Indian reserve

Location
- Country: Canada
- Province: Saskatchewan

Highway system
- Provincial highways in Saskatchewan
← Highway 934	→ Highway 936

Highway 935 is a provincial highway in the north-west region of the Canadian province of Saskatchewan. It runs from Highway 165 into the Morin Lake 217 Indian reserve. It is about 8 kilometres (5.0 mi) long.

In 2025, the bridge carrying Highway 935 across Morin Creek near the Morin Lake 217 Indian reserve was replaced at a cost of $1.2 Million. The bridge was destroyed during the 2025 wildfire season in Saskatchewan.

== See also ==
- Roads in Saskatchewan
- Transportation in Saskatchewan
