= Nesset Lake =

Lake in Saskatchewan, Canada

- Location in Saskatchewan Nesset Lake (Canada)
- Location: RM of Meadow Lake No. 588, Saskatchewan
- Coordinates: 54.0768°N 108.6539°W
- Part of: Churchill River drainage basin
- River sources: Meadow Lake Escarpment
- Basin countries: Canada
- Surface area: 232.1 ha (574 acres)
- Max. depth: 5 m (16.4 ft)
- Surface elevation: 491 m (1,611 ft)
- Settlements: None

Nesset Lake is a shallow lake in the Canadian province of Saskatchewan. It is about 15 kilometres (9.3 mi) west-southwest of the town of Meadow Lake in the Rural Municipality of Meadow Lake No. 588. Most of the lake and surrounding landscape is provincially protected as the Nesset Lake Recreation Site (54.0765°N 108.6449°W). There are no communities nor amenities at Nesset Lake and the nearest highway is Highway 304.

Nesset Lake is on the northern edge of the Meadow Lake Escarpment and its outflow is a small river that flows out from the eastern shore. The river heads east into Meadow Lake, which is in the Churchill River drainage basin.

== See also ==
- List of lakes of Saskatchewan
- List of protected areas of Saskatchewan
- Ness Lakes
- Nesslin Lake
