= Saskatchewan Highway 936 =

Provincial highway in Saskatchewan, Canada

Highway 936
- Tracey Road

Route information
- Maintained by Ministry of Highways and Infrastructure
- Length: 30 km (19 mi)

Major junctions
- South end: CanAm Highway / Highway 2 north of Weyakwin
- North end: Dead end

Location
- Country: Canada
- Province: Saskatchewan

Highway system
- Provincial highways in Saskatchewan
← Highway 935	→ Highway 937

Highway 936, also known as Tracey Road, is a provincial highway in the Canadian province of Saskatchewan. Lying entirely within the Northern Saskatchewan Administration District, it runs from the CanAm Highway (Highway 2) to a dead end. It is about 30 kilometres (19 mi) long.

== See also ==
- Roads in Saskatchewan
- Transportation in Saskatchewan
