= Saskatchewan Highway 929 =

Provincial highway in Saskatchewan, Canada

Highway 929

Route information
- Maintained by Ministry of Highways and Infrastructure
- Length: 30 km (19 mi)

Major junctions
- South end: Highway 916 near Smoothstone Lake
- North end: dead end

Location
- Country: Canada
- Province: Saskatchewan

Highway system
- Provincial highways in Saskatchewan
| ← Highway 928 | → Highway 930 |

Highway 929, also known as Mihigan Road, is a provincial highway in the north-west region of the Canadian province of Saskatchewan. It runs from Highway 916 to a dead end near Selenite Bay at the northern shore of Smoothstone Lake. It is about 30 kilometres (19 mi) long.

== See also ==
- Roads in Saskatchewan
- Transportation in Saskatchewan
