= Rural Municipality of Garden River No. 490 =

Rural municipality in Saskatchewan, Canada

Garden River No. 490 Russia No. 490 (1913–1928)
- Rural municipality
- Rural Municipality of Garden River No. 490
- Location of the RM of Garden River No. 490 in Saskatchewan
- Coordinates: 53.307°N 105.302°W
- Country: Canada
- Province: Saskatchewan
- Census division: 15
- SARM division: 5
- Formed: January 1, 1913
- Name change: March 24, 1928 (from RM of Russia No. 490)

Government
  - Reeve: Ryan Scragg
  - Governing body: RM of Garden River No. 490 Council
  - Administrator: Rebecca Matthews
  - Office location: Meath Park

Area (2016)
  - Land: 662.9 km^{2} (255.9 sq mi)

Population (2016)
  - Total: 727
  - Density: 1.1/km^{2} (2.8/sq mi)
- Time zone: CST
  - Summer (DST): CST
- Area codes: 306 and 639

The Rural Municipality of Garden River No. 490 (2016 population: 727) is a rural municipality (RM) in the Canadian province of Saskatchewan within Census Division No. 15 and SARM Division No. 5.

== History ==
The RM of Russia No. 490 was originally incorporated as a rural municipality on January 1, 1913. Its name was changed to the RM of Garden River No. 490 on March 24, 1928.

== Geography ==
=== Communities and localities ===
The following urban municipalities are surrounded by the RM.

Villages

- Albertville
- Meath Park
- Weirdale

== Demographics ==
Population history (1981–2016)
Year	Pop.	±%
1981	882	—
1986	808	−8.4%
1991	711	−12.0%
1996	709	−0.3%
2001	725	+2.3%
2006	633	−12.7%
2011	641	+1.3%
2016	727	+13.4%
Source: Statistics Canada via Saskatchewan Bureau of Statistics

In the 2021 Census of Population conducted by Statistics Canada, the RM of Garden River No. 490 had a population of 647 living in 259 of its 295 total private dwellings, a change of −3.6% from its 2016 population of 671. With a land area of 656.6 km^{2} (253.5 sq mi), it had a population density of 1.0/km^{2} (2.6/sq mi) in 2021.

In the 2016 Census of Population, the RM of Garden River No. 490 recorded a population of 727 living in 280 of its 304 total private dwellings, a 13.4% change from its 2011 population of 641. With a land area of 662.9 km^{2} (255.9 sq mi), it had a population density of 1.1/km^{2} (2.8/sq mi) in 2016.

== Government ==
The RM of Garden River No. 490 is governed by an elected municipal council and an appointed administrator that meets on the second Friday of every month. The reeve of the RM is Ryan Scragg while its administrator is Rebecca Matthews. The RM's office is located in Meath Park.

== Transportation ==
Roads

- Highway 355—runs east/west starting at Meath Park and continues across Highway 2 then ends at Sturgeon Lake. serves Albertville, and Meath Park within the RM of Garden River No. 490
- Highway 55—a mainly north south section north of Meath Park
- Highway 120—a mainly north south section south of Meath Park

== See also ==
- List of rural municipalities in Saskatchewan
