= Saskatchewan Highway 937 =

Provincial highway in Saskatchewan, Canada

Highway 937

Route information
- Maintained by Ministry of Highways and Infrastructure
- Length: 5 km (3.1 mi)

Major junctions
- West end: Pear Lake Road
- East end: Highway 921 / Highway 939

Location
- Country: Canada
- Province: Saskatchewan

Highway system
- Provincial highways in Saskatchewan
← Highway 936	→ Highway 938

Highway 937 is a provincial highway in the north-west region of the Canadian province of Saskatchewan. It runs from Highway 921 / Highway 939 westward until it downgrades to a local road near a bridge over a tributary of the Randall River. It is about 5 kilometres (3.1 mi) long.

== See also ==
- Roads in Saskatchewan
- Transportation in Saskatchewan
