= Saskatchewan Highway 931 =

Provincial highway in Saskatchewan, Canada

Highway 931

Route information
- Maintained by Ministry of Highways and Infrastructure
- Length: 5 km (3.1 mi)

Major junctions
- West end: Highway 926
- East end: Snowfield Lakes

Location
- Country: Canada
- Province: Saskatchewan

Highway system
- Provincial highways in Saskatchewan
← Highway 930	→ Highway 932

Highway 931 is a provincial highway in the north-east region of the Canadian province of Saskatchewan. It runs from Highway 926 until it becomes a local road near the Snowfield Lakes. It is about 5 kilometres (3.1 mi) long.

== See also ==
- Roads in Saskatchewan
- Transportation in Saskatchewan
