= Saskatchewan Highway 934 =

Provincial highway in Saskatchewan, Canada

Highway 934

Route information
- Maintained by Ministry of Highways and Infrastructure
- Length: 14 km (8.7 mi)

Major junctions
- West end: Highway 912 near Wapawekka Lake
- East end: dead end

Location
- Country: Canada
- Province: Saskatchewan

Highway system
- Provincial highways in Saskatchewan
← Highway 933	→ Highway 935

Highway 934 is a provincial highway in the Canadian province of Saskatchewan. It runs from Highway 912 to a dead end. It is about 14 kilometres (8.7 mi) long.

== See also ==
- Roads in Saskatchewan
- Transportation in Saskatchewan
