= Rural Municipality of Big River No. 555 =

Rural municipality in Saskatchewan, Canada

Big River No. 555
- Rural municipality
- Rural Municipality of Big River No. 555
- Location of the RM of Big River No. 555 in Saskatchewan
- Coordinates: 53.823°N 107.252°W
- Country: Canada
- Province: Saskatchewan
- Census division: 16
- SARM division: 5
- Formed: October 1, 1977

Government
  - Reeve: Clint Panter
  - Governing body: RM of Big River No. 555 Council
  - Administrator: Michael Yuzik
  - Office location: Big River

Area (2016)
  - Land: 2,487.82 km^{2} (960.55 sq mi)

Population (2016)
  - Total: 889
  - Density: 0.4/km^{2} (1.0/sq mi)
- Time zone: CST
  - Summer (DST): CST
- Area codes: 306 and 639
- Website: Official website

The Rural Municipality of Big River No. 555 (2016 population: 889) is a rural municipality (RM) in the Canadian province of Saskatchewan within Census Division No. 16 and SARM Division No. 5.

== History ==
The RM of Big River No. 555 incorporated as a rural municipality on October 1, 1977.

== Geography ==
=== Communities and localities ===
The following urban municipalities are surrounded by the RM.

Towns

- Big River

The following unincorporated communities are located in the RM.

Organized hamlets

- Nesslin Lake
- Phillips Grove

Localities

- Bodmin
- Chitek
- Chitek Lake
- Ladder Valley

== Parks and recreation ==
There are several provincial campgrounds and a regional park within the RM's boundaries. The eastern boundary of the RM of Big River borders Prince Albert National Park.

- Big River Regional Park
- Shell Lake Recreation Site
- Nesslin Lake Recreation Site
- Ness Lake Recreation Site
- Delaronde Lake (Zig Zag Bay) Recreation Site
- Chitek Lake Recreation Site
- Ski Timber Ridge
- Bug Lake Recreation Site

== Demographics ==
Population history (1981–2016)
Year	Pop.	±%
1981	865	—
1986	901	+4.2%
1991	848	−5.9%
1996	872	+2.8%
2001	883	+1.3%
2006	851	−3.6%
2011	855	+0.5%
2016	889	+4.0%
2021	994	+11.8%
Source: Statistics Canada via Saskatchewan Bureau of Statistics

In the 2021 Census of Population conducted by Statistics Canada, the RM of Big River No. 555 had a population of 994 living in 429 of its 802 total private dwellings, a change of 11.8% from its 2016 population of 889. With a land area of 2,484.13 km^{2} (959.13 sq mi), it had a population density of 0.4/km^{2} (1.0/sq mi) in 2021.

In the 2016 Census of Population, the RM of Big River No. 555 recorded a population of 889 living in 352 of its 656 total private dwellings, a 4% change from its 2011 population of 855. With a land area of 2,487.82 km^{2} (960.55 sq mi), it had a population density of 0.4/km^{2} (0.9/sq mi) in 2016.

== Government ==
The RM of Big River No. 555 is governed by an elected municipal council and an appointed administrator that meets on the second Monday of every month. The Reeve of the RM is Clint Panter while its Administrator is Michael Yuzik. The RM's office is located in Big River.

== See also ==
- List of rural municipalities in Saskatchewan
