= Paddockwood =

Village in Saskatchewan, Canada

- Village
- Location within Saskatchewan Location within Canada
- Coordinates: 53°31′N 105°34′W
- Country: Canada
- Province: Saskatchewan
- Rural municipality: Paddockwood No. 520
- Federal Electoral District: Prince Albert
- Provincial Constituency: Saskatchewan Rivers

Government
  - Mayor: Hintz Reg (2005)
- Time zone: UTC-6 (Central)

Paddockwood (2016 population: 154) is a village in the Canadian province of Saskatchewan within the Rural Municipality of Paddockwood No. 520 and Census Division No. 15. It was named after the town Paddock Wood in Kent, England.

In the early 1900s, Fred Pitts immigrated to the lumberland of Canada. From a log cabin he built there as a home, he set up a post office, collecting letters and parcels on horseback for residents of the settlement. He named the settlement Paddockwood after the village he had left in England.

Paddockwood was the home of the first Red Cross hospital in the British Empire, and was set up after the First World War.

Paddockwood is served by the Paddockwood Public Library as well as a nine-hole golf course, the Helbig's Forest Course. Paddockwood belongs to the Saskatchewan Provincial Constituency of Saskatchewan Rivers and the Federal Electoral District of Prince Albert.

== History ==
Paddockwood incorporated as a village on January 1, 1949.

== Demographics ==
Population history (1981–2016)
Year	Pop.	±%
1981	211	—
1986	197	−6.6%
1991	177	−10.2%
1996	187	+5.6%
2001	171	−8.6%
2006	125	−26.9%
2011	163	+30.4%
2016	154	−5.5%
Source: Statistics Canada via Saskatchewan Bureau of Statistics

In the 2021 Census of Population conducted by Statistics Canada, Paddockwood had a population of 118 living in 51 of its 68 total private dwellings, a change of −23.4% from its 2016 population of 154. With a land area of 0.65 km^{2} (0.25 sq mi), it had a population density of 181.5/km^{2} (470.2/sq mi) in 2021.

In the 2016 Census of Population, the Village of Paddockwood recorded a population of 154 living in 58 of its 70 total private dwellings, a −5.8% change from its 2011 population of 163. With a land area of 0.65 km^{2} (0.25 sq mi), it had a population density of 236.9/km^{2} (613.6/sq mi) in 2016.

== See also ==
- List of villages in Saskatchewan
