= Saskatchewan Highway 921 =

Provincial highway in Saskatchewan, Canada

Highway 921

Route information
- Maintained by Ministry of Highways and Infrastructure
- Length: 25 km (16 mi)

Major junctions
- South end: Highway 916
- North end: Highway 937 / Highway 939

Location
- Country: Canada
- Province: Saskatchewan

Highway system
- Provincial highways in Saskatchewan
← Highway 920	→ Highway 922

Highway 921 is a provincial highway in the north-west region of the Canadian province of Saskatchewan. It runs from Highway 916 to Highway 937 / Highway 939. It is about 25 kilometres (16 mi) long.

== See also ==
- Roads in Saskatchewan
- Transportation in Saskatchewan
