= Timber Bay =

Hamlet in Saskatchewan, Canada

Coordinates: 54°10′06″N 105°40′31″W

Timber Bay is a northern hamlet located in Northern Saskatchewan on the east side of Montreal Lake. It was once on the main highway leading north from Prince Albert. Now the main highway, Highway 2, is on the western side of the lake. Consequently, the community is accessible by a gravel road (Highway 969) but is only 20 minutes by car from the community of Montreal Lake.

In September 1951, the first school in the area was opened in an old log building that was next to a small store and garage owned by Henry Fornier. The first teacher was Bernard McIntyre. Students were from the families named Beatty, Fornier, Pruden and Lee. In 1952, a school was established at its present site.

== Demographics ==
In the 2021 Census of Population conducted by Statistics Canada, Timber Bay had a population of 81 living in 28 of its 35 total private dwellings, a change of −1.2% from its 2016 population of 82. With a land area of 5.99 km^{2} (2.31 sq mi), it had a population density of 13.5/km^{2} (35.0/sq mi) in 2021.

== See also ==
- List of communities in Saskatchewan
