= Meath Park, Saskatchewan =

Village in Saskatchewan, Canada

Village of Meath Park
- Village
- Location of Meath Park in Saskatchewan Village of Meath Park (Canada)
- Coordinates: 53.426°N 105.367°W
- Country: Canada
- Province: Saskatchewan
- Census division: 15
- Rural municipality: Garden River No. 490
- Post office Founded: N/A
- Incorporated (Village): N/A
- Incorporated (Town): N/A

Government
  - Mayor: David Wall
  - Administrator: Rebecca Matthews
  - Governing body: Meath Park Village Council

Area
  - Total: 0.63 km^{2} (0.24 sq mi)

Population (18-MAY-2010)
  - Total: 179
  - Density: 280.6/km^{2} (727/sq mi)
- Time zone: CST
- Postal code: S0J 1T0
- Area code: 306
- Highways: 355, 55, 120
- Website: Official website

Meath Park (2016 population: 175) is a village in the Canadian province of Saskatchewan within the Rural Municipality of Garden River No. 490 and Census Division No. 15.

== History ==
Meath Park incorporated as a village on May 23, 1938. It is named for County Meath in Ireland.

== Demographics ==
Population history (1981–2016)
Year	Pop.	±%
1981	262	—
1986	246	−6.1%
1991	228	−7.3%
1996	210	−7.9%
2001	204	−2.9%
2006	179	−12.3%
2011	205	+14.5%
2016	175	−14.6%
Source: Statistics Canada via Saskatchewan Bureau of Statistics

In the 2021 Census of Population conducted by Statistics Canada, Meath Park had a population of 169 living in 75 of its 86 total private dwellings, a change of −3.4% from its 2016 population of 175. With a land area of 0.53 km^{2} (0.20 sq mi), it had a population density of 318.9/km^{2} (825.9/sq mi) in 2021.

In the 2016 Census of Population, the Village of Meath Park recorded a population of 175 living in 74 of its 82 total private dwellings, a −17.1% change from its 2011 population of 205. With a land area of 0.77 km^{2} (0.30 sq mi), it had a population density of 227.3/km^{2} (588.6/sq mi) in 2016.

== See also ==
- List of communities in Saskatchewan
- List of francophone communities in Saskatchewan
- List of villages in Saskatchewan
