= Saskatchewan Highway 970 =

Provincial highway in Saskatchewan, Canada

Highway 970

Route information
- Maintained by Ministry of Highways and Infrastructure
- Length: 15 km (9.3 mi)

Major junctions
- South end: Highway 265 / Highway 926 near Clearsand Lake
- North end: Dead end near Gaire Lake

Location
- Country: Canada
- Province: Saskatchewan

Highway system
- Provincial highways in Saskatchewan
← Highway 969	→ Highway 980

Highway 970 is a provincial highway in the north-eastern region of the Canadian province of Saskatchewan. It runs from the Highway 265 / Highway 926 intersection near Clearsand Lake north to a dead end near Gaire Lake. It is about 15 kilometres (9.3 mi) long.

== See also ==
- Roads in Saskatchewan
- Transportation in Saskatchewan
