= Alcurve, Alberta =

Unincorporated community in central Alberta, Canada

Coordinates: 53°30′43″N 110°04′00″W

Location of Alcurve Alberta

Alcurve is an unincorporated community in central Alberta, Canada, within the County of Vermilion River. It is located 4 km (2.5 mi) west of the Alberta–Saskatchewan border on Highway 45, approximately 26 km (16 mi) north of Lloydminster.

The Alcurve Store is at the intersection of Highways 17, 45 and 3. The Alcurve Community Hall hosts concerts, craft sales, and other functions.
