= Cowan Lake (Saskatchewan) =

Lake in Saskatchewan, Canada

- Location in Saskatchewan Cowan Lake (Canada)
- Location: Saskatchewan
- Type: Reservoir
- Part of: Churchill River drainage basin
- Primary inflows: Big River
- Primary outflows: Cowan River
- Basin countries: Canada
- Surface area: 3,175.5 ha (7,847 acres)
- Max. depth: 7.1 m (23 ft)
- Water volume: 40,334 dam^{3} (32,699 acre⋅ft)
- Shore length^{1}: 126.05 km (78.32 mi)
- Surface elevation: 483 m (1,585 ft)
- Islands: Craddock Island
- Settlements: Big River
- ^{1} Shore length is not a well-defined measure.

Cowan Lake is a lake in the Canadian province of Saskatchewan in the Beaver River watershed. The southern part of Cowan Lake is in the RM of Big River No. 555, the central part is in the RM of Meadow Lake No. 588, and the northern end is in the Northern Administration District. The primary inflow for the lake is Big River at the lake's southern end by the town of Big River and the outflow, located near the lake's northern end, is Cowan River at Cowan Lake Dam. The dam was originally built in 1937 and was upgraded in 1971. It is 4.2 metres (14 ft) high and the total volume of the reservoir created by the dam is 40,334 dam^{3} (32,699 acre⋅ft).

Highway 55 follows the length of the lake along its eastern shore and Highway 942 runs up most of the length of the western shore.

== Parks and recreation ==
At the southern end of Cowan Lake at the town of Big River is Big River Regional Park (53.8379°N 107.0239°W). The park has a campground and boat launch on the lake's shore. At the northern end of the lake is Cowan Dam Recreation Site (54.1930°N 107.4503°W). It is a small campground at the dam that is accessed from Highway 55.

== Fish species ==
Commonly found fish in Cowan Lake include northern pike, yellow perch, and walleye.

== See also ==
- List of lakes of Saskatchewan
- List of protected areas of Saskatchewan
- Saskatchewan Water Security Agency
- Dams and reservoirs in Saskatchewan
