= Purple sand =

Beach coloration caused by mineral deposits

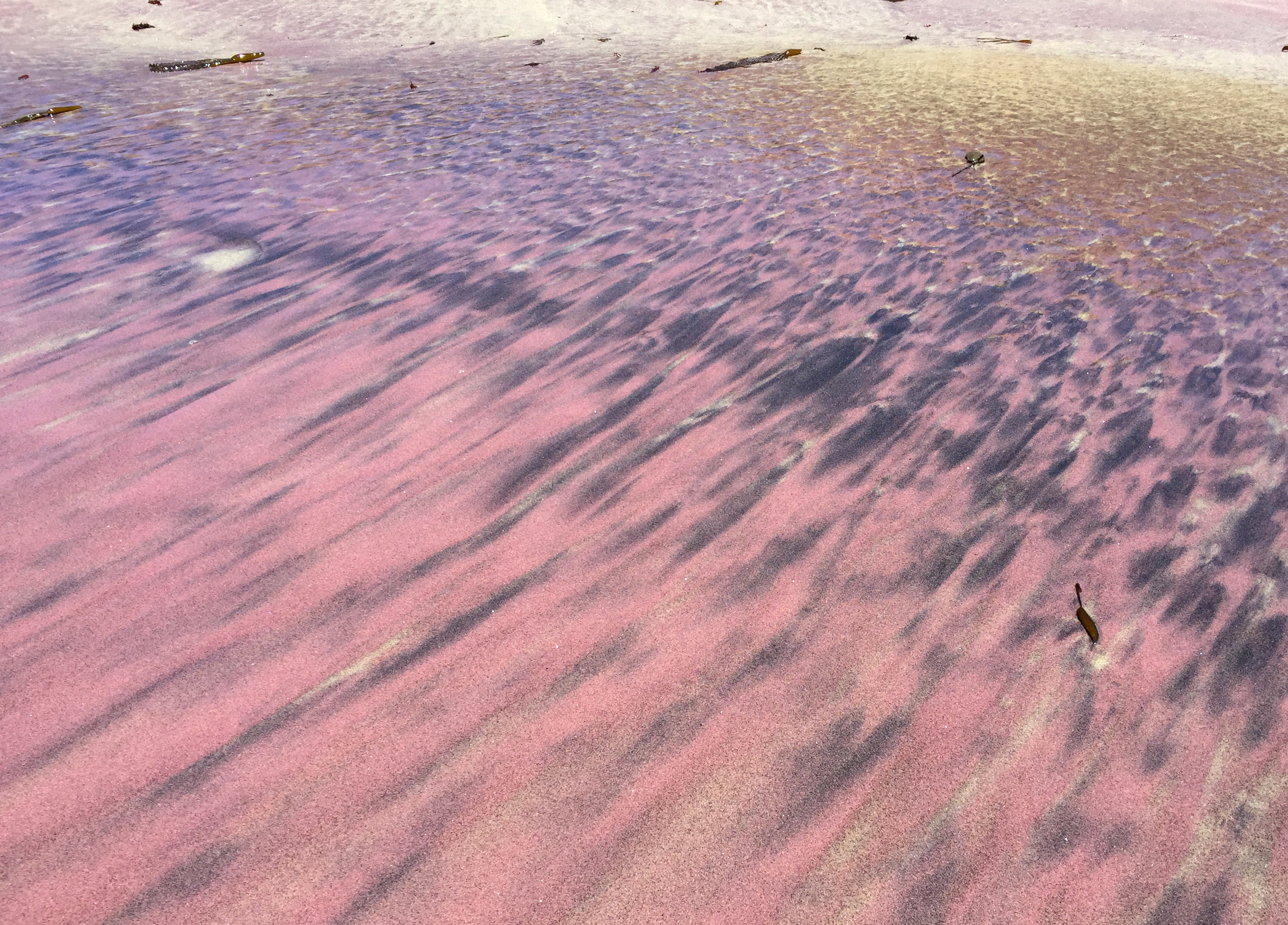
Purple Sand patterns on Pfeiffer Beach, CA

Purple beaches are a phenomenon caused by the presence of a large amounts of almandine-pyrope garnet. or other purple minerals like manganese or rose quartz that have accumulated in the local sediment. These purple beaches are primarily found in the western Canadian Shield region or the northern continental United States; often in proximity to a major river systems with coarse sediment, a glacial sediment source, or input from glacial or para-glacial sediment.

== Causes ==
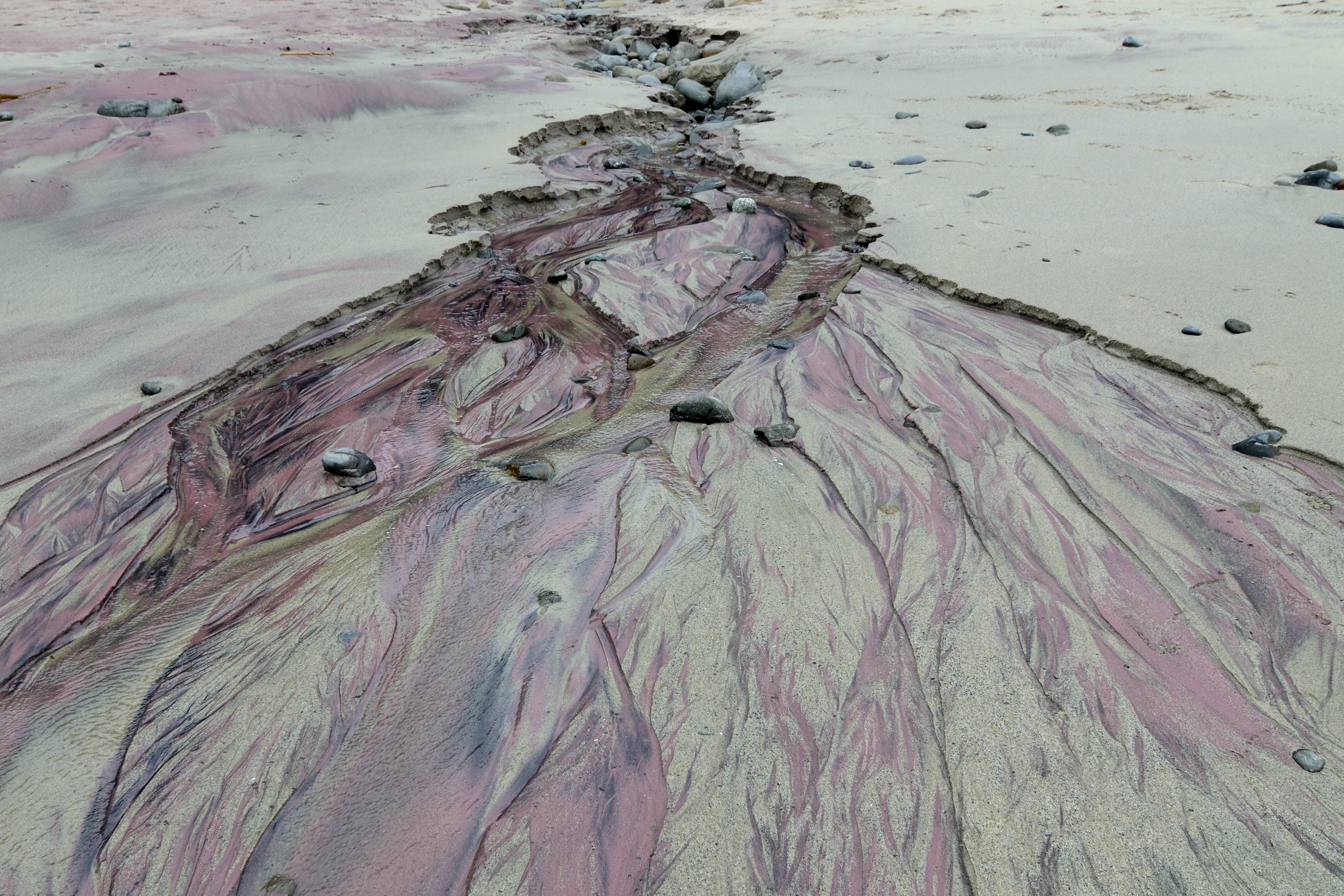
Purple sand on Pfeiffer Beach.

Surficial garnet deposits primarily originate from the glacial erosion of plutons, with the majority from the glacial erosion of the Canadian Shield caused by ice flow during retreat of the Laurentide Ice Sheet. These beaches often have stripes of various colors or shades caused by the waves sorting the minerals by density and therefore color. As a wave comes ashore it pushes less-dense minerals higher up the beach while denser minerals settle first. The relatively low density of the garnet causes it to rise to the top of the sand giving the beaches their unique color.

== Purple Sand Beaches ==
- Pfeiffer Beach, Big Sur, California, USA.
- Plum Island, Massachusetts, USA
- Purple Sand Beach, Candle Lake Provincial Park, Saskatchewan, Canada
- Clearwater Lake, Clearwater Lake Provincial Park, Manitoba, Canada
- Good Spirit Lake, Good Spirit Provincial Park, Saskatchewan, Canada
- Candle Lake, Candle Lake Provincial Park, Saskatchewan, Canada
- Garnet Beach, Cold Lake, Alberta, Canada
