= Cowan River =

River in Saskatchewan, Canada

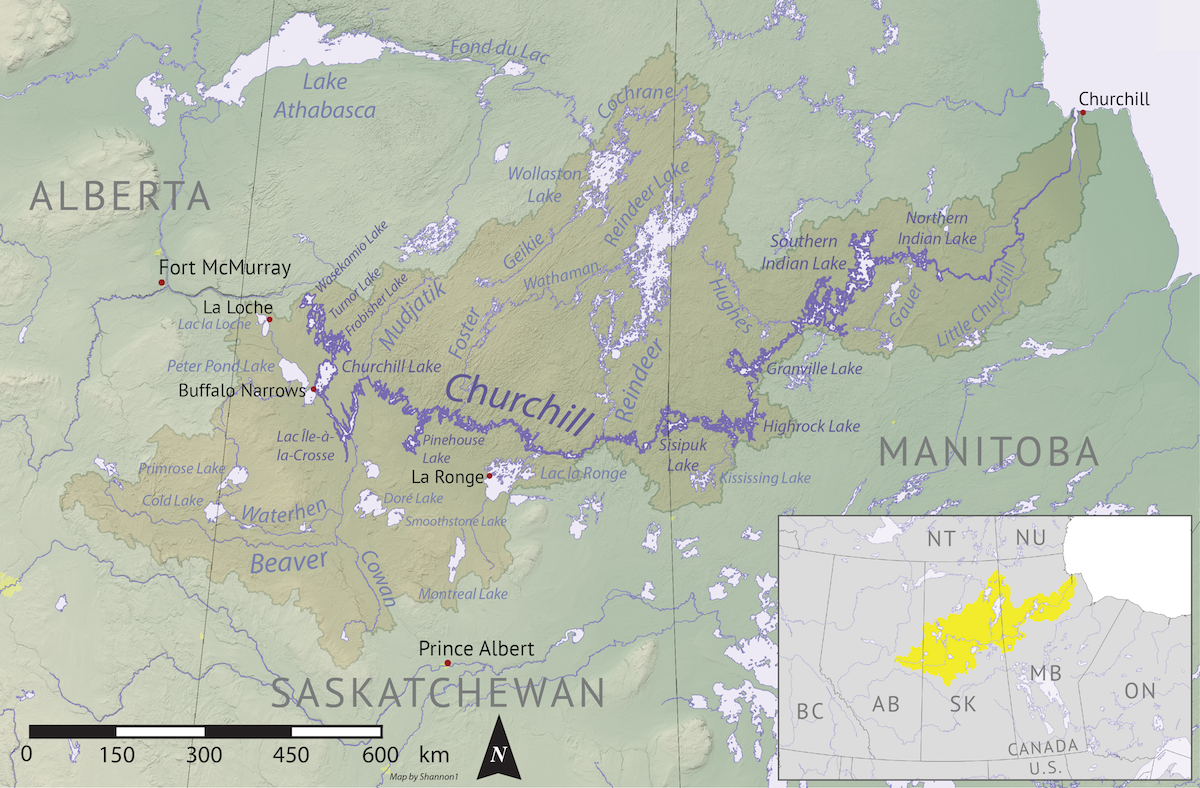
- Churchill River drainage basin

- Location of the mouth in Saskatchewan Cowan River (Canada)

Location
- Country: Canada
- Provinces: Saskatchewan

Physical characteristics
- Source: Cowan Lake
  - coordinates: 54.1940°N 107.4466°W
  - elevation: 483 m (1,585 ft)
- Mouth: Beaver River
  - location: Northern Saskatchewan Administration District
  - coordinates: 54.4216°N 107.8505°W
  - elevation: 468 m (1,535 ft)

Basin features
- River system: Churchill River
- Tributaries
  - right: Taggart Creek

Cowan River is a river in the west-central part of the Canadian province of Saskatchewan in the boreal forest ecozone of Canada. The river begins at Cowan Lake Dam near the northern end of Cowan Lake and flows north-west through muskeg and forest to meet Beaver River. Beaver River then flows into Lac Île-à-la-Crosse and the Churchill River. The entirety of Cowen River is within the Northern Saskatchewan Administration District and while there are no communities along its course, the towns of Big River and Spiritwood are in its watershed.

Within Cowan River's watershed, there are many lakes and rivers. Some of the more notable include the river's source, Cowan Lake and its primary inflow, Big River, Delaronde Lake, Taggart Lake, Little Whitefish Lake, Witchekan Lake, and Ladder Lake. Delaronde Lake is at the western edge of the Waskesiu Upland and several creeks and rivers flow from the upland into the lake. Delaronde Lake then flows into Taggart Lake which connects to Cowan River through Taggart Creek.

At either end of the river, there's a provincial recreation site. Cowan Dam Recreation Site is at Cowan Lake Dam and Beaver / Cowan Rivers Recreation Site is at the confluence of Cowan River and Beaver River.

== Beaver / Cowan Rivers Recreation Site ==
Beaver / Cowan Rivers Recreation Site (54.4243°N 107.8568°W) is a campground located north of the village of Green Lake where Cowan River meets Beaver River. The park has 11 free campsites along the east bank of Beaver River and access is from Highway 155. There is access to both rivers from the park.

== Fish species ==
Fish commonly found in Cowan River include walleye and northern pike.

== See also ==
- List of rivers of Saskatchewan
- Hudson Bay drainage basin
- List of protected areas of Saskatchewan
