= Delaronde Lake =

Lake in Saskatchewan, Canada

- Location in Saskatchewan Delaronde Lake (Canada)
- Location: RM of Big River No. 555, Saskatchewan
- Coordinates: 54.0501°N 107.0506°W
- Part of: Churchill River drainage basin
- Primary inflows: Tie Creek
- River sources: Waskesiu Upland
- Basin countries: Canada
- Surface area: 12,390.6 ha (30,618 acres)
- Max. depth: 40 m (130 ft)
- Shore length^{1}: 154.6 km (96.1 mi)
- Surface elevation: 496 m (1,627 ft)
- Islands: Delaronde Island; Zig Zag Island
- Settlements: Phillips Grove
- ^{1} Shore length is not a well-defined measure.

Delaronde Lake is a lake in the Canadian province of Saskatchewan. It is situated at the western edge of the Waskesiu Upland in the boreal forest ecozone of Canada. Delaronde Lake is within the Churchill River drainage basin of the Hudson Bay.

Most of Delaronde Lake is in the Rural Municipality of Big River No. 555 with only the northernmost part in the Northern Saskatchewan Administration District. Along the lake's shores are campgrounds, resorts, cottage communities, and a Bible camp. Access to the lake and its amenities is from Highway 922. At about 10 kilometres (6.2 mi) to the south-west, Big River is the closest town.

== Description ==
Delaronde Lake is a long and narrow lake that is separated into two sections — north and south — by a narrow channel. The north section is deep, with depths of up to 40 metres (130 ft), while the south section is shallow at only 7 metres (23 ft) deep. The lake is situated at the western end of the Waskesiu Upland, and, as such, the upland's western slopes are within the lake's catchment. Prince Albert National Park encompasses much of the Waskesiu Upland.

Delaronde Lake has two named islands — Zig Zag and Delaronde — and multiple bays. The outflow river is at Hall Bay at the northern end of the lake's southern section. This river flows a short distance north-west into Taggart Lake. Taggart Creek then flows out of Taggart Lake heading north where it meets the Cowan River near Highway 924. The Cowan River is a tributary of the Beaver River, which, in turn, is a tributary of the Churchill River.

Along the shores of Delaronde Lake are small communities, subdivisions, and campgrounds, all of which are at the southern end of the lake. These include Phillips Grove, Lakeshore RV Properties, Stoney Bay Campground, Delaronde Resort, Big River Bible Camp, Island View Shores, and Delaronde Lake (Zig Zag Bay) Recreation Site.

== Delaronde Lake (Zig Zag Bay) Recreation Site ==
Delaronde Lake (Zig Zag Bay) Recreation Site (53.9448°N 106.9378°W) is a leased provincial campground at Zig Zag Bay on the east side of the south section of Delaronde Lake. This heavily wooded, 745 ha (1,840-acre) park has a campground, marina, sandy beach, and boat launch. Access is from Highway 922.

== Fish species ==
Fish commonly found in Delaronde Lake include northern pike, whitefish, lake trout, and walleye.

== See also ==
- List of lakes of Saskatchewan
- Tourism in Saskatchewan
