= Sled Lake, Saskatchewan =

Community in Saskatchewan, Canada

Coordinates: 54°25′50″N 107°19′28″W

Location of Sled Lake in Saskatchewan

Sled Lake is a northern settlement in Northern Saskatchewan. The community is at the south-eastern shore of Sled Lake and access is from Highway 924.

== Demographics ==
In the 2021 Census of Population conducted by Statistics Canada, Sled Lake had a population of 24 living in 12 of its 27 total private dwellings, a change of 140% from its 2016 population of 10. With a land area of 1.97 km^{2} (0.76 sq mi), it had a population density of 12.2/km^{2} (31.6/sq mi) in 2021.

== See also ==
- List of communities in Northern Saskatchewan
- List of communities in Saskatchewan
