= Pinehouse Lake =

Lake in Saskatchewan, Canada

- ᑭᓀᐱᑯ ᓵᑲᐦᐃᑲᓂᕽ; kinêpiko-sâkahikanihk (Woods Cree)
- Location of Pinehouse Lake in Saskatchewan Pinehouse Lake (Canada)

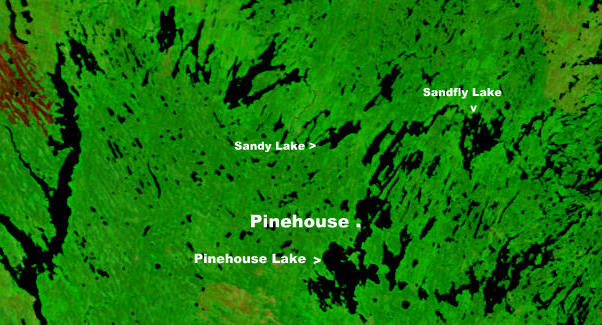
- NASA image of Pinehouse Lake in Saskatchewan
- Location: Northern Administration District, Saskatchewan
- Coordinates: 55°32′N 106°35′W
- Type: Glacial lake
- Part of: Churchill River drainage basin
- Primary inflows: Churchill River
- Primary outflows: Churchill River
- Basin countries: Canada
- Surface area: 404 km^{2} (156 sq mi)
- Surface elevation: 384 m (1,260 ft)
- Islands: numerous islands
- Settlements: Pinehouse

Pinehouse Lake (Woods Cree: ᑭᓀᐱᑯ ᓵᑲᐦᐃᑲᓂᕽ, romanized: kinêpiko-sâkahikanihk, lit. 'at the Snake Lake') is a lake in northern Saskatchewan, Canada. The northern village of Pinehouse is located on the western shore.

The Churchill River flows in from Sandy Lake into the north-west end of the lake at McDonald Bay and flows out through the north-east end of the lake into Sandfly Lake. The Churchill River is largely a series of interconnected lakes that flows from its source at Churchill Lake east to the Hudson Bay.

== See also ==
- List of lakes of Saskatchewan
