= Big River, Saskatchewan =

Town in Saskatchewan, Canada

Big River
- Town
- Motto: Gateway to the North
- Location of Big River in Saskatchewan Big River (Canada)
- Coordinates: 53.837°N 107.035°W
- Country: Canada
- Province: Saskatchewan
- Census division: No. 16
- Rural Municipality: Big River
- Post office founded: 1910

Government
  - Mayor: Chad Dunn
  - Administrator: Noreen Olsen
  - MLA Saskatchewan Rivers: Eric Schmalz
  - MP Prince Albert: Randy Hoback

Area
  - Total: 2.51 km^{2} (0.97 sq mi)

Population (2016)
  - Total: 700
  - Density: 255/km^{2} (660/sq mi)
- Time zone: Central Standard Time
- Postal code: S0J 0E0
- Area code: 306
- Highways: Highway 55
- Website: http://www.bigriver.ca/

Big River is a town located on the southern end of Cowan Lake in north central Saskatchewan, Canada. It is just north of Saskatchewan's extensive grain belt on Highway 55 (part of the inter-provincial Northern Woods and Water Route) and about 16 kilometres (10 mi) west of Prince Albert National Park. Delaronde Lake is accessed east of the town. Big River is approximately 132 kilometres (82 mi) from Prince Albert.

Except for some land cleared for farming and a few natural meadows, the town is surrounded by the northern boreal forest.

== History ==
Big River began as a company town created as a base for the lumber industry at the turn of the 20th century. Commercial fishing also played a major role in the town in the early years. In 1910 a post office opened in Big River. It incorporated in 1921.

== Demographics ==
In the 2021 Census of Population conducted by Statistics Canada, Big River had a population of 666 living in 296 of its 340 total private dwellings, a change of −4.9% from its 2016 population of 700. With a land area of 2.68 km^{2} (1.03 sq mi), it had a population density of 248.5/km^{2} (643.6/sq mi) in 2021.

Canada census – Big River community profile

	2021	2011
Population	666 (-4.9% from 2016)	639 (-12.2% from 2006)
Land area	2.68 km^{2} (1.03 sq mi)	2.51 km^{2} (0.97 sq mi)
Population density	248.1/km^{2} (643/sq mi)	255.0/km^{2} (660/sq mi)
Median age	40.4 (M: 38.0, F: 45.2)	40.9 (M: 38.4, F: 42.0)
Private dwellings	340 (total) 296 (occupied)	307 (total)
Median household income	$63,600

References: 2021 2011

== Big River Regional Park ==
Big River Regional Park (53.8379°N 107.0239°W) is a regional park located in the town of Big River that is divided into two sections. At the western end of Main Street, on the eastern shore of Cowan Lake, is Cowan Lake Campground. It has 16 campsites, lake and beach access, modern washrooms/showers, a camp kitchen, a boat launch, a fish cleaning station, and a children's playground. The other campground is located on the north side of town and is called the Community Centre Campground. It has 49 individual campsites as well as group camping, washrooms/showers, ball diamonds, laundry, horseshoe pits, and a playground.

Kitty-corner to the Community Centre Campground is the 9-hole Big River Golf Course. It was built in 1971 and is a 2,935-yard, par 35 grass green course. It has a licensed clubhouse and pro shop.

== Education ==
There are two schools in the community. Big River Public High School (Grade 7 to 12) & TD Michel Public School (Pre-K to Grade 6). They are part of the Saskatchewan Rivers School Division #119 out of Prince Albert.

== Notable people ==
- Barry Pederson, former NHL player
- Jim Neilson, former NHL player

== See also ==
- List of communities in Saskatchewan
- List of towns in Saskatchewan
- Big River Airport
- Big River (Saskatchewan)
