= Bodmin, Saskatchewan =

Unincorporated community in Saskatchewan

Coordinates: 53°45′15″N 106°59′10″W

Location of Bodmin in Saskatchewan

Bodmin is an unincorporated community in Saskatchewan.
