= Candle Lake, Saskatchewan =

Village in Saskatchewan, Canada

Candle Lake
- Resort village
- Resort Village of Candle Lake
- Location within Saskatchewan Location within Canada
- Coordinates: 53.785°N 105.257°W
- Country: Canada
- Province: Saskatchewan
- Census division: 15
- Rural municipality: RM of Paddockwood No. 520
- Incorporated: August 1, 1977

Government
  - Mayor: Terry Kostyna
  - Governing body: Resort Village Council
  - Administrator: Brent Lutz

Area (2016)
  - Land: 63.32 km^{2} (24.45 sq mi)

Population (2016)
  - Total: 840
  - Density: 13.3/km^{2} (34/sq mi)
- Time zone: CST
  - Summer (DST): CST
- Area codes: 306 and 639
- Highway(s): 265
- Waterway(s): Candle Lake
- Website: candlelake.ca

Candle Lake (2016 population: 840) is a resort village in the Canadian province of Saskatchewan within Census Division No. 15. It is on the shores of Candle Lake in the Rural Municipality of Paddockwood No. 520.

== History ==
Candle Lake incorporated as a resort village on August 1, 1977.

== Demographics ==
Population history (1981–2016)
Year	Pop.	±%
1981	219	—
1986	284	+29.7%
1991	365	+28.5%
1996	463	+26.8%
2001	503	+8.6%
2006	792	+57.5%
2011	765	−3.4%
2016	840	+9.8%
Source: Statistics Canada via Saskatchewan Bureau of Statistics

In the 2021 Census of Population conducted by Statistics Canada, Candle Lake had a population of 1,160 living in 589 of its 1,698 total private dwellings, a change of 38.1% from its 2016 population of 840. With a land area of 62.93 km^{2} (24.30 sq mi), it had a population density of 18.4/km^{2} (47.7/sq mi) in 2021.

In the 2016 Census of Population conducted by Statistics Canada, the Resort Village of Candle Lake recorded a population of 840 living in 413 of its 1,665 total private dwellings, a 9.8% change from its 2011 population of 765. With a land area of 63.32 km^{2} (24.45 sq mi), it had a population density of 13.3/km^{2} (34.4/sq mi) in 2016.

== Government ==
The Resort Village of Candle Lake is governed by an elected municipal council and an appointed administrator that meets on the second Friday of every month. The mayor is Coleen Lavoie and its administrator is Brent Lutz.

== See also ==
- List of communities in Saskatchewan
- List of francophone communities in Saskatchewan
- List of municipalities in Saskatchewan
- List of resort villages in Saskatchewan
- List of villages in Saskatchewan
- List of summer villages in Alberta
