= Montreal Lake Cree Nation =

Woodland Cree First Nation in northern Saskatchewan, Canada

Coordinates: 54.0529°N 105.7866°W

- Band No. 354
- ᒨᓂᔮᐏ ᓵᑲᐦᐃᑲᓂᕽ
- People: Cree
- Treaty: Treaty 6
- Headquarters: Montreal Lake
- Province: Saskatchewan

Land
- Land area: 60.96 km^{2} (23.54 sq mi)

Population (2013)
- On reserve: 2,261
- Off reserve: 1,417
- Total population: 3,678

Government
- Chief: Chief Joyce Naytowhow McLeod
- Council size: 8
- Council: List of Counselors: Joyce Naytowhow McLeod; Dean Henderson; Troy Naytowhow; Eldon Henderson; Carol Naytowhow; Rick Bird; Charmaine Ermine; Elysa Halkett

Tribal Council
- Prince Albert Grand Council

Website
- https://mlcn.ca/

Location of Montreal Lake in Saskatchewan

The Montreal Lake Cree Nation (Cree: ᒨᓂᔮᐏ ᓵᑲᐦᐃᑲᓂᕽ, môniyâwi-sâkahikanihk) is a Woodland Cree First Nation in northern Saskatchewan. The administrative centre of the Montreal Lake Cree Nation is located in the community of Montreal Lake on the shores of Montreal Lake.

== Band government ==
The village is the administrative centre of the Montreal Lake First Nations band government. Chief William Charles and his councillors signed an adhesion to Treaty 6 in 1889 on behalf of Montreal Lake First Nation. and is a member of the Prince Albert Grand Council.

As of March 2013, the total membership of the Montreal Lake First Nation was 3,678 with 2,261 members living on-reserve or on crown land and 1,417 living off reserve. It is governed by a Chief and 8 councillors. It has territory at Montreal Lake 106 (population 999), Montreal Lake 106 B (population 389) and Timber Bay (population 93).

== Demographics ==
Canada census – Montreal Lake Cree Nation community profile

	2016	2011
Population	1113 (+11.4% from 2011)	999 (+13.5% from 2006)
Land area	60.96 km^{2} (23.54 sq mi)	60.96 km^{2} (23.54 sq mi)
Population density	18.3/km^{2} (47/sq mi)	16.4/km^{2} (42/sq mi)
Median age	23.1 (M: 23.2, F: 23.1)	20.2 (M: 20.3, F: 19.9)
Private dwellings	277 (total)	291 (total)
Median household income

References: 2016 2011
