= Baldy Lake =

Lake in Saskatchewan, Canada

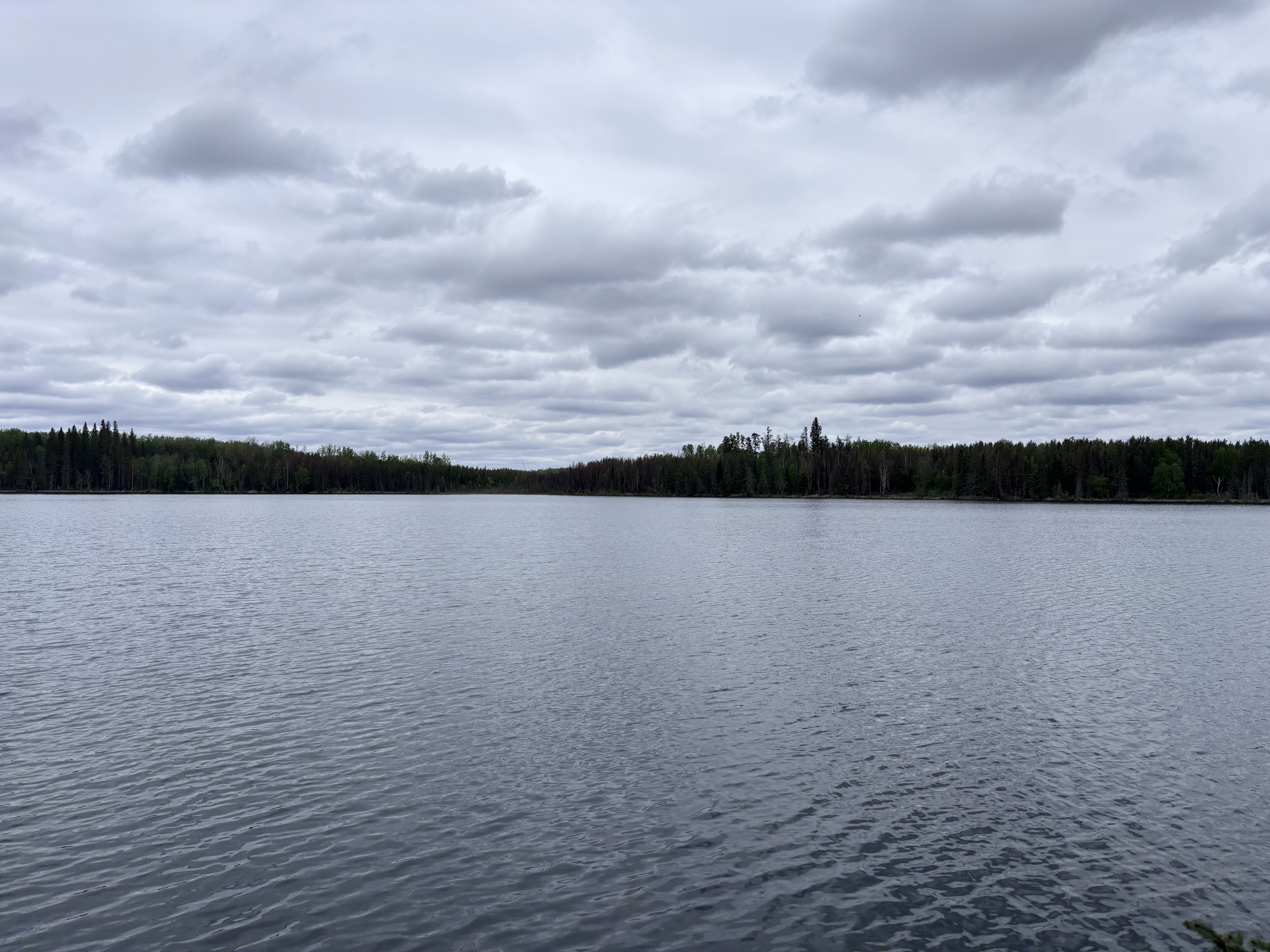
- Baldy Lake

- Location in Saskatchewan Baldy Lake (Canada)
- Location: Narrow Hills Provincial Park, Saskatchewan
- Coordinates: 54.1068°N 104.6425°W
- Part of: Saskatchewan River drainage basin
- River sources: Cub Hills
- Basin countries: Canada
- Max. length: 1.3 km (0.81 mi)
- Max. width: .32 km (0.2 mi)
- Surface area: 24.6 ha (61 acres)
- Max. depth: 11.43 m (37.5 ft)
- Shore length^{1}: 3.3 km (2.1 mi)
- Surface elevation: 595 m (1,952 ft)
- Settlements: None
- ^{1} Shore length is not a well-defined measure.

Baldy Lake is a lake in the east-central part of the Canadian province of Saskatchewan in Narrow Hills Provincial Park. It is situated in the Cub Hills and the boreal forest ecozone of Canada.

Baldy Lake is accessed from a secondary road that branches off from the Hanson Lake Road. It is east of the larger Stickley Lake and is surrounded by a forest of mature jack pine. The lake's outflow is a short stream that flows west into Stickley Lake, which in turn flows south into Upper Fishing Lake. Upper Fishing Lake is along the course of Caribou Creek, which flows into Lower Fishing Lake and eventually on to the Saskatchewan River via Stewart Creek and Torch River.

== Recreation ==
Baldy Lake Campground is a small campground located at the northern end of the lake that is RV accessible with 12 non-electric campsites. At the campground, there's access to the lake, a boat launch, picnic tables, a fishing cleaning station, and fire pits. It is one of four campgrounds in the Narrow Hills Provincial Park that are RV accessible. The other three are located at Lower Fishing Lake, Zeden Lake, and Ispuchaw Lake.

== Fish species ==
Fish commonly found in Baldy Lake include walleye, yellow perch, white sucker, and northern pike. The lake is periodically stocked with walleye fry.

== See also ==
- List of lakes of Saskatchewan
- List of protected areas of Saskatchewan
- Tourism in Saskatchewan
