= Cub Hills =

Hilly plateau in Saskatchewan, Canada

- Location within Saskatchewan Location within Canada

Highest point
- Elevation: 684 m (2,244 ft)
- Prominence: 300 m (980 ft)
- Coordinates: 54°15′00″N 104°30′01″W

Geography
- Location: Saskatchewan, Canada
- Parent range: Cub Hills

The Cub Hills are a hilly plateau located south-east of the geographical centre of the Canadian province of Saskatchewan. The hills are in the boreal forest ecozone of Canada and the landforms of the hills were shaped more than 10,000 years ago during last ice age. Throughout the Cub Hills, there are dozens of lakes and rivers and several parks. The Cubs Hills are 150 km (93 mi) north-east of Prince Albert and are in the Northern Saskatchewan Administration District and Census Division #18. Several highways criss-cross the plateau to provide access to the various parks and other amenities.

The principal highway through the Cub Hills is Highway 106, also known as the Hanson Lake Road, which begins at Smeaton and travels north into the hills then east to Flin Flon and the border with Manitoba. Other highways through the hills include 120, 912, 913, and 920.

== Geography ==
The glaciers retreated from the area about 10,000 years ago. And in their wake, they created many of the landforms in and around the Cub Hills, such as the valleys, lakes, and lowlands. Throughout the plateau, evidence left behind by the glaciers includes deposits of eskers and push moraines and tunnel valleys, which were created by subglacial erosion by meltwater. Many of the lakes, known as potholes, were created by depressions caused by dead ice when the glaciers were receding.

Boreal forest, muskeg, rolling hills, and small lakes and rivers are prominent features of the landscape today.

=== Lakes and rivers ===
The Cub Hills are entirely within the Hudson Bay drainage basin. Most of the hills are part of the Saskatchewan River watershed, including the northern, eastern, and southern slopes. The western slope of the hills flows north through the tributaries of the Nipekamew River, which flows into Lac la Ronge then the Churchill River via the Rapid River. The waters of the northern slope work their way north into various tributaries of the Sturgeon-Weir River, which meets up with the Saskatchewan River near the Manitoba border after going through Namew Lake, Whitey Narrows, and then Cumberland Lake of the Saskatchewan River Delta. The eastern slope of the hills is drained by the Mossy River and its tributaries into the Saskatchewan River Delta. Several rivers flow south out of the hills and into the east-flowing Torch River — a tributary of the Saskatchewan River.

Over 25 bodies of water throughout the hills are stocked with fish. The first stockings occurred in 1934 with the stocking of brook trout in McDougal Creek and Lost Echo Creek. In those two rivers, and three others, Nipekamew Creek, White Gull Creek, and Mossy River, brook trout became naturalised and feral. Lakes such as Piprell, Summit, and Zeden are also stocked. All seven species of trout in Saskatchewan are found in the Cub Hills, including brown, rainbow, cutthroat, brook, tiger, lake, and splake.

Other notable lakes in the hills include Upper and Lower Fishing Lakes, Little Bear Lake, the Gem Lakes, Ispuchaw Lake, Crabtree Lake, Nipekamew Lake, Odell Lake, Lost Echo Lake, Bean Lake, and Stickley Lake. Big Sandy Lake is a large lake that is located at the north-eastern edge of the hills.

== Parks and recreation ==
Narrow Hills Provincial Park, originally established in 1934 as Nipawin Provincial Forest, covers much of the southern portion of the Cub Hills. The park has over 25 lakes, multiple campgrounds, lodges, and a wide network of trails for hiking, snowmobiling, and ATVing.

There are four provincial recreation sites in and around the hills, all of which have campgrounds and access to lakes. They include Piprell Lake, Little Bear Lake, Jayjay Lake, and Big Sandy Lake.

The Cub Hills Game Preserve (54.2001°N 104.4004°W) is a game preserve in the south-eastern area of the Cub Hills.

== Flora and fauna ==
The forests of the Cub Hills are classified as Mid-Boreal Upland and trees found in the forests of the hills include jack pine, aspen, birch, and spruce. There is a wide variety of animals that make the Cub Hills home, including moose, white-tailed deer, elk, black bears, timber wolves, lynx, snowshoe hares, beaver, and muskrats. Bird species include the loon and red-tailed hawk.

== See also ==
- List of protected areas of Saskatchewan
- List of mountains of Saskatchewan
- Geography of Saskatchewan
