= Lost Echo Lake =

Lake in Saskatchewan, Canada

- Location in Saskatchewan Lost Echo Lake (Canada)
- Location: Narrow Hills Provincial Park, Saskatchewan
- Coordinates: 54.1334°N 104.7504°W
- Part of: Saskatchewan River drainage basin
- Primary inflows: Caribou Creek
- River sources: Cub Hills
- Primary outflows: Caribou Creek
- Basin countries: Canada
- Surface area: 95.6 ha (236 acres)
- Max. depth: 13.72 m (45.0 ft)
- Shore length^{1}: 5.43 km (3.37 mi)
- Surface elevation: 523 m (1,716 ft)
- ^{1} Shore length is not a well-defined measure.

Lost Echo Lake is a lake in the east-central part of the Canadian province of Saskatchewan in Narrow Hills Provincial Park. It is situated in a glacier-formed valley in the Cub Hills and the boreal forest ecozone of Canada. It is south of Summit Lake and is accessed from secondary roads that branch off of Highway 913. While there are no communities nor settlements on the lake, there is the Lost Echo Wilderness Campsite on the western shore.

== Description ==
Lost Echo Lake is situated along the course of Caribou Creek in a valley in the Cub Hills, south of Summit Lake and north of Upper Fishing Lake. From Lost Echo Lake, Caribou Creek carries on down the valley, passing through the lakes of Lower Echo Lake and Upper Fishing Lake and into Lower Fishing Lake. Lower Fishing lake is drained by Stewart Creek, which flows south into Torch River. Torch River flows east into the Saskatchewan River and is part of the Hudson Bay drainage basin. Inflows for the lake include waters flowing in from Summit Lake via Caribou Creek, and nearby hills and muskeg.

== Fish species ==
Fish commonly found in Lost Echo Lake include walleye, northern pike, and lake trout. The lake's outflow was first stocked with brook trout in 1934. The creek is well suited for brook trout and as a result, the trout developed a sustainable, naturalised population.

== See also ==
- List of lakes of Saskatchewan
- List of protected areas of Saskatchewan
- Tourism in Saskatchewan
