= Summit Lake (Saskatchewan) =

Lake in Saskatchewan, Canada

- Location in Saskatchewan Summit Lake (Canada)
- Location: Narrow Hills Provincial Park, Saskatchewan
- Coordinates: 54.1586°N 104.7283°W
- Part of: Saskatchewan River drainage basin
- Primary outflows: Caribou Creek
- Basin countries: Canada
- Surface area: 233.4 ha (577 acres)
- Max. depth: 19.21 m (63.0 ft)
- Shore length^{1}: 15.05 km (9.35 mi)
- Surface elevation: 555 m (1,821 ft)
- ^{1} Shore length is not a well-defined measure.

Summit Lake is a lake in the east-central part of the Canadian province of Saskatchewan in Narrow Hills Provincial Park. It is situated in a glacier-formed valley in the Cub Hills and the boreal forest ecozone of Canada. It is located north of Lost Echo Lake and is accessed from Highway 913. There are no communities or settlements on the lake.

Several small rivers flow into Summit Lake from the surrounding hills and muskeg. Its outflow is at the western end and, via a short river, it flows into Caribou Creek, which flows south through the lakes of Lost Echo, Lower Echo, Upper Fishing, and Lower Fishing and is a tributary of the south flowing Stewart Creek. Stewart Creek flows into the east flowing Torch River, which is a tributary of the Saskatchewan River and part of the Hudson Bay drainage basin.

== Fish species ==
Fish commonly found in Summit Lake include lake trout, northern pike, walleye, and yellow perch. The lake was last stocked with 100,000 walleye fry in 2019.

== See also ==
- List of lakes of Saskatchewan
- Hudson Bay drainage basin
