= McDougal Creek =

River in Saskatchewan, Canada

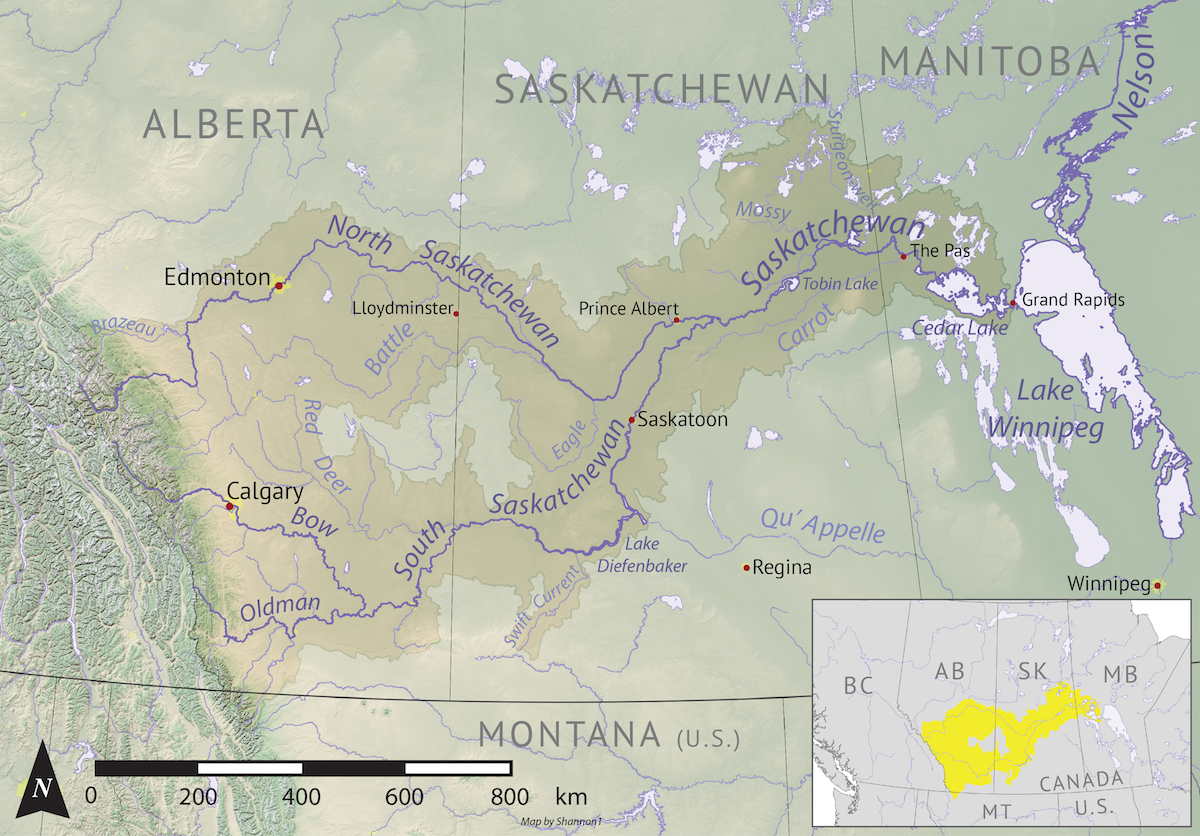
- Map of Saskatchewan River drainage basin

- Location of the mouth in Saskatchewan McDougal Creek (Canada)

Location
- Country: Canada
- Province: Saskatchewan

Physical characteristics
- Source: Divide Lake
  - location: Narrow Hills Provincial Park
  - coordinates: 54.2489°N 104.6540°W
- Mouth: Mossy River
  - coordinates: 54.1735°N 103.7802°W
  - elevation: 381 m (1,250 ft)
- Length: 130 km (81 mi)

Basin features
- River system: Nelson River

McDougal Creek is a river in the Canadian province of Saskatchewan. The river's source is at the southern end of Divide Lake at the northern end of Narrow Hills Provincial Park in a hilly plateau called Cub Hills. The landforms of the Cub Hills, such as the lakes, streams, steeply rolling hills, and flat lowlands, were formed over 10,000 years ago during the last ice age. The entire course of the river is in the boreal forest ecozone of Canada.

Divide Lake is a small bifurcation lake of which the north flowing outlet goes into Little Bear Lake and the southern outlet is McDougal's source. From Divide Lake, the river travels south through the park and hills, then easterly en route to the Mossy River, which is a tributary of the Saskatchewan River.

== Description ==
McDougal Creek is a trout river that begins at the southern end of Divide Lake where it travels south through a glacier formed valley in the north-east region of Narrow Hills Provincial Park. From the start, the river roughly follows the route of Hanson Lake Road. Just before Hanson Lake Road's intersection with Highway 913, the river crosses the road and begins heading south-east past McDougal Creek Wilderness Campsite before crossing Highway 920 and heading east. A large portion of the park's eastern boundary follows the course of McDougal Creek. The river then leaves the park and the Cub Hills and continues eastward through much flatter terrain and muskeg until it joins up with Mossy River. Mossy River continues on in a south-easterly direction and meets the Saskatchewan River at the Saskatchewan River Delta.

== Brook trout ==
Brook trout were first introduced to McDougal Creek in 1934 and with further stockings in the 1950s and 1960s, the population became self-sustaining. Since then, brook trout have been introduced to 25 rivers in the Cub Hills with five of those rivers now supporting populations of naturalised, self-sustaining feral brook trout. The other four rivers include the creeks of Nipekamew, White Gull, and Lost Echo and Mossy River. All seven of Saskatchewan's trout species can be found in the Cub Hills.

== See also ==
- List of rivers of Saskatchewan
- Hudson Bay drainage basin
