= White Gull Creek =

River in Saskatchewan, Canada

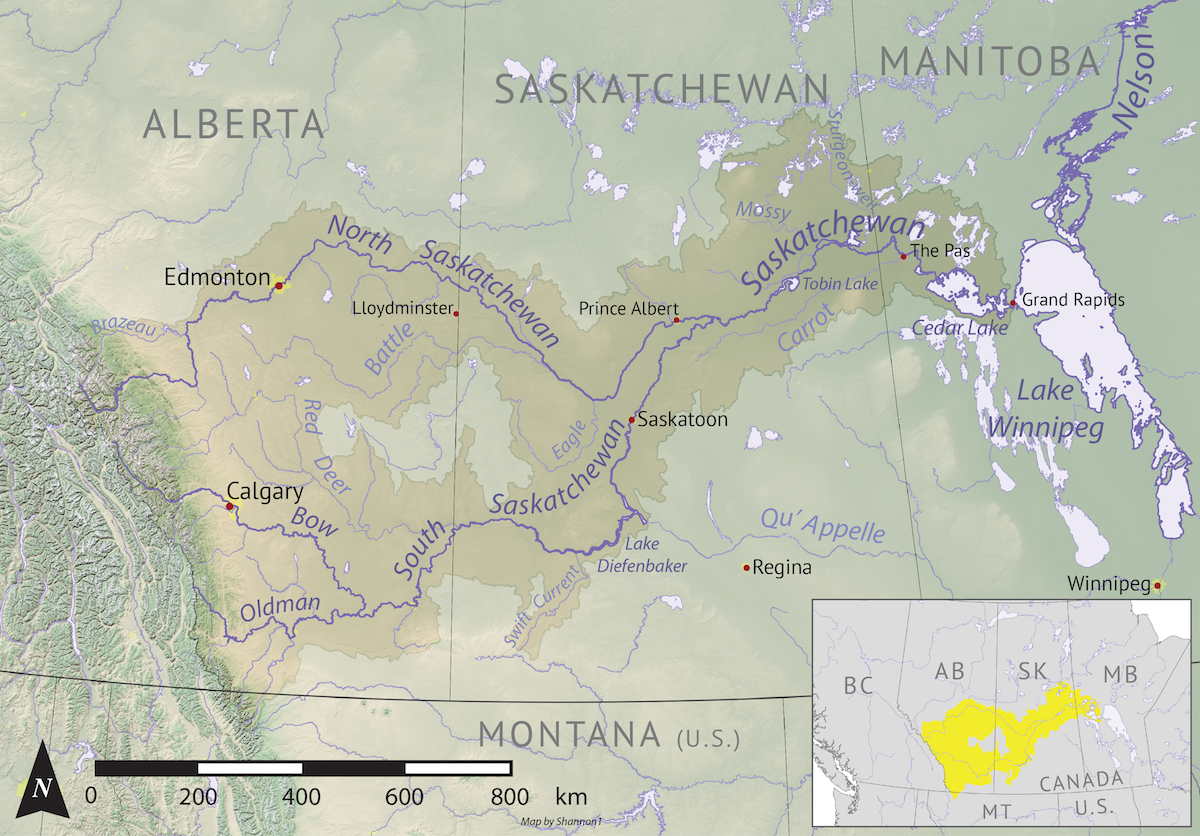
- Map of Saskatchewan River drainage basin

- Location of the mouth in Saskatchewan White Gull Creek (Canada)

Location
- Country: Canada
- Province: Saskatchewan

Physical characteristics
- Source
  - location: White Gull Lake
  - coordinates: 53.8953°N 105.0249°W
  - elevation: 570 m (1,870 ft)
- Mouth: Torch River
  - coordinates: 53.7532°N 104.4415°W
  - elevation: 416 m (1,365 ft)
- Length: 150 km (93 mi)

Basin features
- River system: Nelson River

White Gull Creek is a river in the Canadian province of Saskatchewan. The river's source is White Gull Lake, near the south-western boundary of Narrow Hills Provincial Park and near the southern slopes of the Cub Hills. The river travels through boreal forest and muskeg en route to its mouth at the Torch River. The Torch River is a tributary of the Saskatchewan River as it flows into one of North America's largest inland fresh water deltas, the Saskatchewan River Delta. There are no communities nor settlements along the river.

== Description ==
White Gull Creek begins at White Gull Lake in the Northern Saskatchewan Administration District and flows in a south-easterly direction for about 150 kilometres until it meets up with the Torch River in the RM of Torch River No. 488. White Gull Lake, at 5.31 m (17.4 ft) deep and 1,345.3 ha (3,324 acres) in size, is located east of Candle Lake and south-west of Narrow Hills Provincial Park. For the first leg of White Gull Creek, it heads due east and is paralleled by Highway 120. At the point where the river starts to head south-east, Highway 120 turns course and heads north-east, crossing the river. Highway 106 crosses the river farther downstream. The forests along course of the river consist of jack pine, poplar, spruce, and willow and the geography consists of muskeg and rolling hills.

== Brook trout ==
Brook trout were first introduced to White Gull Creek in 1949 and, with subsequent plantings, became naturalised. The trout are continually being stocked biannually to supplement the naturalised population. Brook trout were first introduced to the Cub Hills in 1934 with the stocking of McDougal and Lost Echo Creeks. Since then, the fish have been introduced to 25 rivers in the hills with five of those rivers now supporting populations of naturalised, self-sustaining feral brook trout. The other rivers include Nipekamew Creek and Mossy River. All seven of Saskatchewan's trout species can be found in the Cub Hills.

== See also ==
- List of rivers of Saskatchewan
- Hudson Bay drainage basin
