= Nipekamew Creek =

River in Saskatchewan, Canada

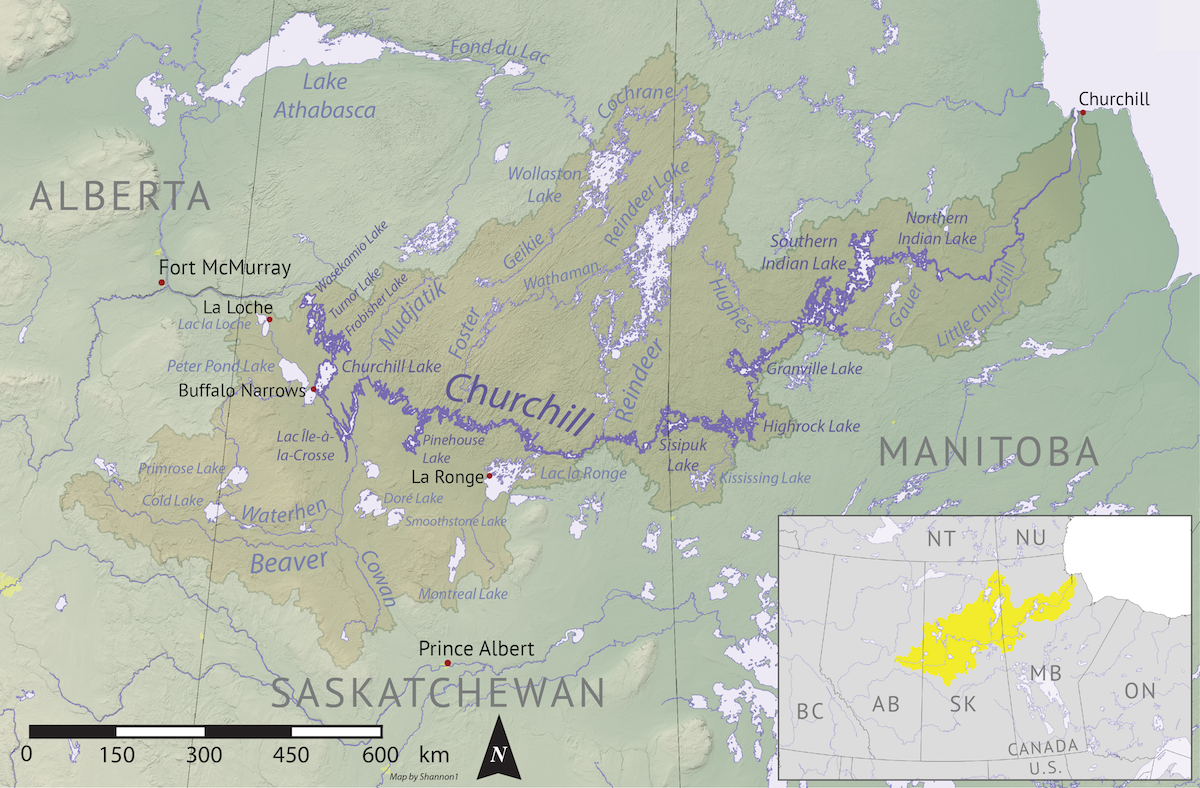
- Churchill River drainage basin

- Location of the mouth in Saskatchewan Nipekamew Creek (Canada)

Location
- Country: Canada
- Provinces: Saskatchewan

Physical characteristics
- Source
  - coordinates: 54°08′27″N 104°58′30″W
- Mouth: Nipekamew Lake
  - location: Northern Saskatchewan Administration District
  - coordinates: 54°20′19″N 104°57′09″W
  - elevation: 500 m (1,600 ft)

Basin features
- River system: Churchill River

Nipekamew Creek is a river in the boreal forest ecozone in the Canadian province of Saskatchewan. Its source is in muskeg approximately 20 kilometres (12 mi) west of Piprell Lake, near Highway 913. From the muskeg, the creek flows in a northerly direction through forests, rolling hills, glacier formed valleys, first into Stuart Lake, then Nipekamew Lake. The creek can be accessed from Highways 927, 913, and 912. After the creek leaves Stuart Lake, it follows the course of Highway 912 from there until it empties into Nipekamew Lake.

Nipekamew Creek travels along the western edge of the Cub Hills and along its course, it travels through forests of jack pine, spruce, birch, and poplar. It arrives at the southern end of Nipekamew Lake, just south of East Trout–Nipekamew Lakes Recreation Site, and from the northern end of Nipekamew Lake, the waters carry on via Nipekamew River and into Lac la Ronge. Lac la Ronge flows into the Churchill River through Rapid River.

== Brook trout ==
Brook trout were first introduced to Nipekamew Creek in 1954 and a biannual stocking programme continues to supplement the creek's naturalised population. Brook trout have been introduced to 25 rivers in the Cub Hills with five of those rivers now supporting populations of naturalised, self-sustaining feral brook trout. The other four rivers include the creeks of McDougal, White Gull, and Lost Echo and Mossy River. All seven of Saskatchewan's trout species can be found in the Cub Hills.

== See also ==
- List of rivers of Saskatchewan
- Hudson Bay drainage basin
