= Caribou Creek =

River in Saskatchewan, Canada

Caribou Creek Lost Echo Creek
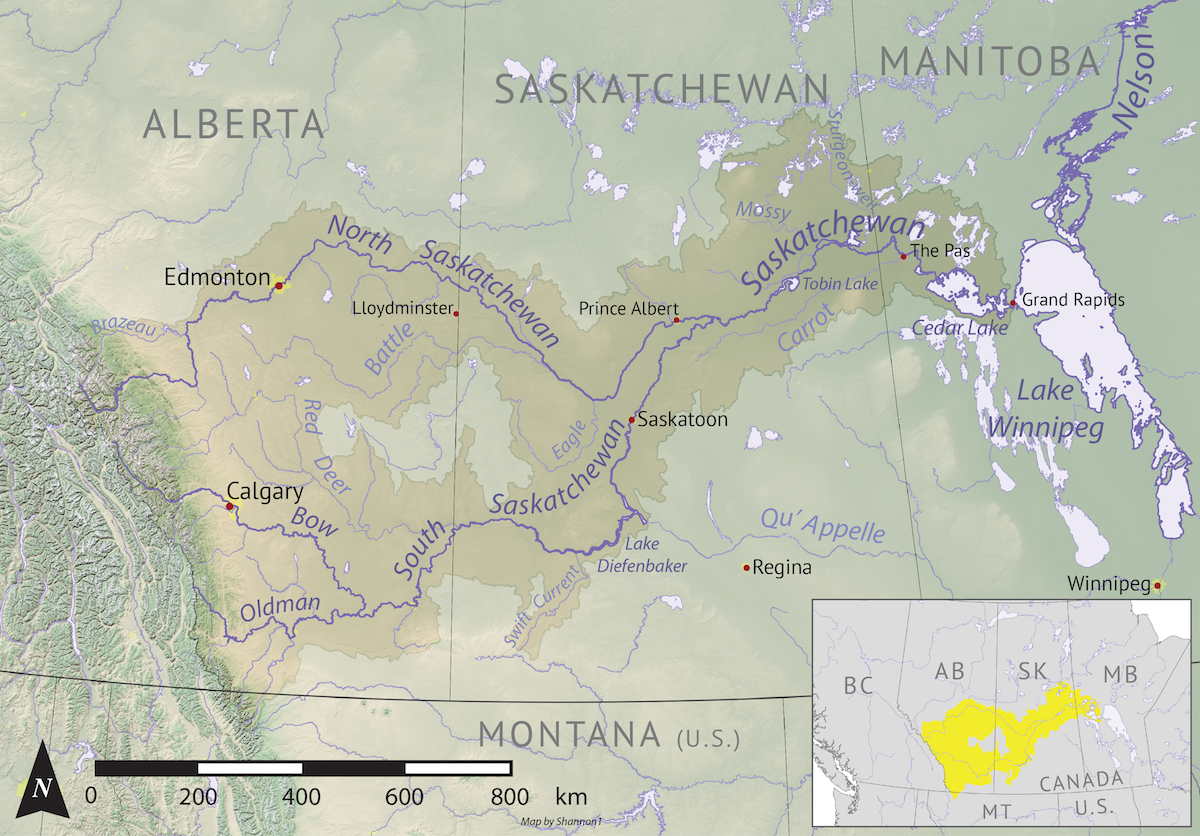
- Map of Saskatchewan River drainage basin

- Location of the mouth in Saskatchewan Caribou Creek (Canada)

Location
- Country: Canada
- Province: Saskatchewan

Physical characteristics
- Source
  - coordinates: 54.1738°N 104.8306°W
- Mouth: Lower Fishing Lake
  - coordinates: 54.0452°N 104.6388°W
  - elevation: 502 m (1,647 ft)

Basin features
- River system: Nelson River

Caribou Creek is a river in the east-central part of the Canadian province of Saskatchewan. The river's source is in a hilly plateau called Cub Hills, near the western boundary of Narrow Hills Provincial Park. The river heads south following a glacier-carved valley through the Cub Hills en route to its mouth at Lower Fishing Lake. The entire course of the river is in the boreal forest ecozone of Canada. Caribou Creek is a tributary of Stewart Creek, which flows south and into the east-flowing Torch River. Torch River is a tributary of the Saskatchewan River as it flows into the Saskatchewan River Delta. Much of the upper watershed was burned in 1977 in what is known as the Fishing Lakes Fire and is now dominated by a forest of jack pine.

Caribou Creek is accessed from the Hanson Lake Road along the southern shore of Upper Fishing Lake. Along the highway, near the point where Caribou Creek flows out of Upper Fishing Lake, is Caribou Creek Lodge. The lodge features a motel, cabins, a dining room, fuel, and a convenience store.

== Course ==
Caribou Creek begins in muskeg and swamp in a valley formed over 10,000 years ago during the last ice age at the western boundary of Narrow Hills Provincial Park, just south of Highway 913. North flowing waters from that valley make their way into the Nipekamew Creek while south flowing waters form Caribou Creek. Caribou Creek follows the course of the valley to Lower Fishing Lake. Along the way, it is joined by several tributaries and there are three lakes along its course.

The first notable tributary to meet Caribou Creek is a river that begins at Bean Lake, near the northern boundary of Narrow Hills Provincial Park, and flows south to meet it. Less than a mile downstream, a short stream from Summit Lake meets Caribou Creek and then it opens up into Lost Echo Lake. From the south end of Lost Echo Lake, the river opens up to a much smaller Lower Echo Lake. From there, Caribou Creek continues southward and is joined by tributaries from Fairy Glen Lake and Strickly Lake before emptying into Upper Fishing Lake. That stretch of river from Lost Echo Lake south to Upper Fishing Lake–a distance of 12 kilometres–is also known as Lost Echo Creek. From the eastern end of Upper Fishing Lake, the river carries on south-east past Caribou Creek Lodge and across Hanson Lake Road for about a mile and terminates at Lower Fishing Lake.

== Brook trout ==
Brook trout were first introduced to the Lost Echo Creek portion of Caribou Creek in 1934. As Lost Echo Creek is well suited for brook trout, they adapted well and became naturalised. The only access to the creek is through trails off of Hanson Lake Road.

Since 1934, brook trout have been introduced to 25 rivers in the Cub Hills with five of those rivers now supporting populations of naturalised, self-sustaining feral brook trout. The other four rivers include the creeks of Nipekamew, White Gull, and McDougal and Mossy River. All seven of Saskatchewan's trout species can be found in the Cub Hills.

== See also ==
- List of rivers of Saskatchewan
- Hudson Bay drainage basin
