= Lower Fishing Lake =

Lake in Saskatchewan, Canada

- Location in Saskatchewan Lower Fishing Lake (Canada)
- Location: Narrow Hills Provincial Park, Saskatchewan
- Coordinates: 54.0334°N 104.6337°W
- Part of: Saskatchewan River drainage basin
- Primary inflows: Caribou Creek
- River sources: Cub Hills
- Primary outflows: Stewart Creek
- Basin countries: Canada
- Surface area: 382 ha (940 acres)
- Max. depth: 10.1 m (33 ft)
- Shore length^{1}: 18.74 km (11.64 mi)
- Surface elevation: 487 m (1,598 ft)
- ^{1} Shore length is not a well-defined measure.

Lower Fishing Lake is a lake in the east-central part of the Canadian province of Saskatchewan in Narrow Hills Provincial Park. It is situated in the Cub Hills and the boreal forest ecozone of Canada. The lake is accessed from Highway 920, which connects to Hanson Lake Road and Highway 120.

Forest fires in 1977 and 2025 burned vast swathes of the forest around the lake. The Shoe Fire forced the closure of Narrow Hills Provincial Park for the 2025 season.

== Description ==
Lower Fishing Lake is the terminus for Caribou Creek, which is a river that flows south from other lakes in Narrow Hills Provincial Park, such as Summit, Lost Echo, and Upper Fishing in the Cub Hills. At the southern end of the lake, Stewart Creek flows out and heads south where it meets up with the east flowing Torch River. Torch River is a tributary of the Saskatchewan River in the Hudson Bay drainage basin.

The Fishing Lakes Fire of 1977 burned much of the forest upstream and around the lake. The region recovered with a forest of jack pine, which is a tree species that is well adapted fire burned forests. In 2025, the 500,000-hectare (1,200,000-acre) Shoe Fire burned the forest around the lake, as well as much of Narrow Hills Provincial Park. The park and its facilities were closed until 2026.

== Recreation ==
Along the south-eastern shore of Lower Fishing Lake is Pine Ridge Resort and Lower Fishing Lake Campground. The campground has over 80 electrified campsites, picnic grounds, nature trails, a playground, shower and washroom facilities, potable water, and a sani-dump. The campground at Lower Fishing Lake is one of four campgrounds in Narrow Hills Provincial Park that are RV accessible. The other three are located at Ispuchaw Lake, Baldy Lake, and Zeden Lake.

Pine Ridge Resort has cabins, seasonal RV sites, shower and washroom facilities, and a confectionery that offers groceries, tackle, bait, and souvenirs. The sandy Lower Fishing Lake Beach on the lake is accessible by both the resort and campground and there is a boat launch and boat and canoe rentals.

Along the north-eastern shore of the lake is another beach called Narrow Hills Beach.

== Fish species ==
Fish commonly found in Lower Fishing Lake include northern pike and walleye.

== See also ==
- List of lakes of Saskatchewan
- List of protected areas of Saskatchewan
- Tourism in Saskatchewan
