= Ispuchaw Lake =

Lake in Saskatchewan, Canada

- Location in Saskatchewan Ispuchaw Lake (Canada)
- Location: Narrow Hills Provincial Park, Saskatchewan
- Coordinates: 54.0001°N 104.6838°W
- Part of: Saskatchewan River drainage basin
- River sources: Cub Hills
- Basin countries: Canada
- Surface area: 159.7 ha (395 acres)
- Max. depth: 7.78 m (25.5 ft)
- Shore length^{1}: 7.4 km (4.6 mi)
- Surface elevation: 518 m (1,699 ft)
- ^{1} Shore length is not a well-defined measure.

Ispuchaw Lake is a lake in the east-central part of the Canadian province of Saskatchewan in Narrow Hills Provincial Park. It is situated in the Cub Hills and the boreal forest ecozone of Canada. The lake is surrounded by a forest of mature jack pine.

Ispuchaw Lake is situated between Highway 920 and the Hanson Lake Road, with access to the campground and boat launch off of Hanson Lake Road. Lower Fishing Lake is located to the north-east and Zeden Lake is located directly to the south-east.

== Recreation ==
Ispuchaw Lake Campground is on the eastern shore of the lake. It is a small campground with five non-electric campsites, a picnic area, fire pits, a fish cleaning station, and a boat launch. Ispuchaw Lake Campground is one of four campgrounds in Narrow Hills Provincial Park that are RV accessible. The other three are located at Lower Fishing Lake, Baldy Lake, and Zeden Lake. Fish commonly found in the lake include northern pike and walleye.

== See also ==
- List of lakes of Saskatchewan
- List of protected areas of Saskatchewan
- Tourism in Saskatchewan
- Hudson Bay drainage basin
