= Zeden Lake =

Lake in Saskatchewan, Canada

- Location in Saskatchewan Zeden Lake (Canada)
- Location: Narrow Hills Provincial Park, Saskatchewan
- Coordinates: 53.9881°N 104.6722°W
- Part of: Saskatchewan River drainage basin
- Basin countries: Canada
- Surface area: 31 ha (77 acres)
- Max. depth: 10.01 m (32.8 ft)
- Shore length^{1}: 2.34 km (1.45 mi)
- Surface elevation: 527 m (1,729 ft)
- Settlements: None
- ^{1} Shore length is not a well-defined measure.

Zeden Lake is a small recreational lake known for its trout fishing in the east-central part of the Canadian province of Saskatchewan in Narrow Hills Provincial Park. It is situated in the Cub Hills and the boreal forest ecozone of Canada. The lake is surrounded by a forest of mature jack pine.

Zeden Lake is located directly south-east of Ispuchaw Lake and is accessed from the Hanson Lake Road.

== Recreation ==
Zeden Lake Campground is at a sandy beach on the eastern shore of the lake. It is a small campground with 13 non-electric campsites, a picnic area, fire pits, potable water, a fish cleaning station, a playground, and a boat launch. Zeden Lake Campground is one of four campgrounds in Narrow Hills Provincial Park that are RV accessible. The other three are located at Lower Fishing Lake, Baldy Lake, and Ispuchaw Lake.

== Fish stocking ==
The lake has been stocked several times over the years with various trout species, making it a lake known for its trout fishing. In 2015 the lake was stocked with tiger trout and in 2018 it was stocked with 5,000 brown trout fingerlings, 3,725 rainbow trout catchables, and 54 rainbow trout adults. Perch, the native species of the lake, are also found in the lake.

== See also ==
- List of lakes of Saskatchewan
- List of protected areas of Saskatchewan
- Tourism in Saskatchewan
