= Stewart Creek (Saskatchewan) =

River in Saskatchewan, Canada

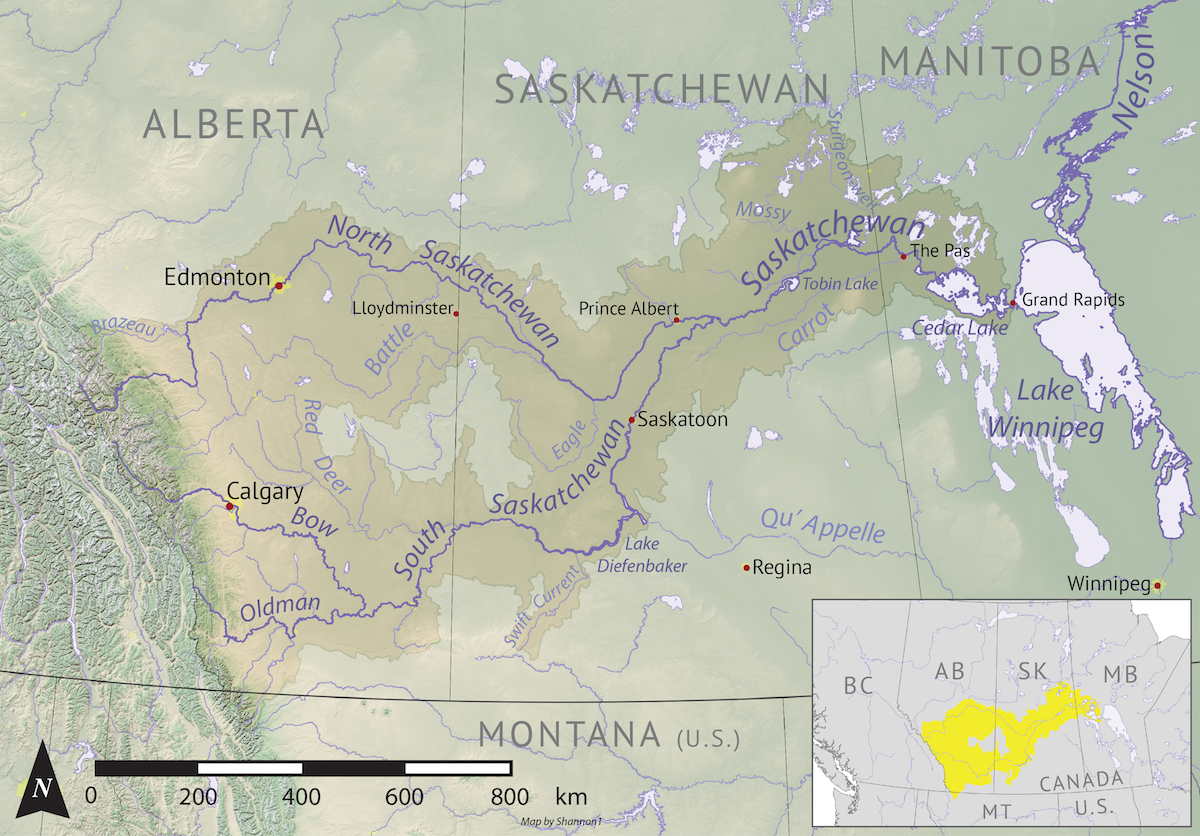
- Map of Saskatchewan River drainage basin

- Location of the mouth in Saskatchewan Stewart Creek (Saskatchewan) (Canada)

Location
- Country: Canada
- Province: Saskatchewan

Physical characteristics
- Source
  - location: Lower Fishing Lake
  - coordinates: 54.0224°N 104.6356°W
  - elevation: 487 m (1,598 ft)
- Mouth
  - location: Torch River
  - coordinates: 53.7532°N 104.3576°W
  - elevation: 416 m (1,365 ft)

Basin features
- River system: Nelson River
- Tributaries
  - left: Caribou Creek

Stewart Creek is a river in the east-central part of the Canadian province of Saskatchewan. The river's source is Lower Fishing Lake of the Cub Hills in Narrow Hills Provincial Park, and it travels south through boreal forest and muskeg en route to its mouth at the Torch River. The Torch River flows east to the Saskatchewan River, which is part of the Hudson Bay drainage basin. There are no communities nor settlements along the course of the river.

A portion of Narrow Hills Provincial Park's southern boundary follows the course of the Stewart Creek. Also near the park's southern boundary, Highway 926 crosses the river. Stewart Creek is the middle one of three rivers that run south together out of the Cub Hills and into the Torch River. To the west of Stewart Creek runs White Gull Creek and to the east is Falling Horse Creek. All three rivers meet at the Torch River within a short distance of each other.

Stewart Creek's source is Lower Fishing Lake, which is Caribou Creek's terminus. Along Stewart Creek's course, it is fed by several smaller rivers and streams.

== See also ==
- List of rivers of Saskatchewan
- Hudson Bay drainage basin
