= Mossy River =

River in Saskatchewan, Canada

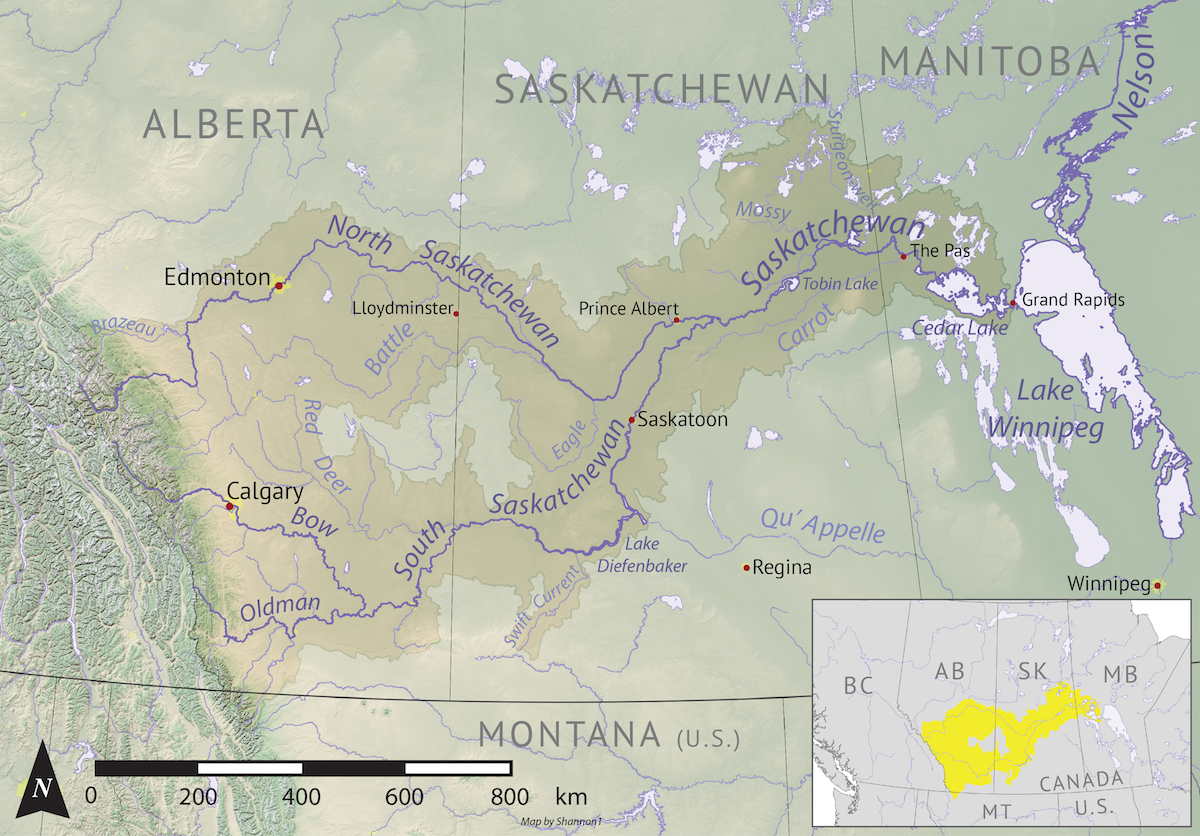
- Map of Saskatchewan River drainage basin

- Location of the mouth in Saskatchewan Mossy River (Canada)

Location
- Country: Canada
- Province: Saskatchewan

Physical characteristics
- Source
  - location: Cub Hills
  - coordinates: 54.3137°N 104.4904°W
  - elevation: 659 m (2,162 ft)
- Mouth: Saskatchewan River Delta
  - coordinates: 54.0796°N 102.9645°W
  - elevation: 270 m (890 ft)
- Length: 100 km (62 mi)

Basin features
- River system: Nelson River
- Tributaries
  - left: Brougham Creek
  - right: Scarth River; South Mossy River; McDougal Creek

Mossy River is a river in the Canadian province of Saskatchewan. The river's source is east of Little Bear Lake and north-east of Narrow Hills Provincial Park in a hilly plateau called Cub Hills. The river travels through hills, boreal forest, and muskeg for about 100 kilometres en route to its mouth in the Saskatchewan River Delta. Highway 920 is the only road to access the mainstem of the river and there are no communities nor settlements along the course of the river.

== Description ==
Mossy River begins at a small lake in the Cub Hills, just east of Little Bear Lake. Over 10,000 years ago at the end of the last ice age, the retreating glaciers shaped the landforms of the Cub Hills forming the valleys, lakes, and streams. The Mossy River flows east out of the hills through a glacier formed valley and into flatter land characterised by muskeg and boreal forest. The river meets Highway 920 as it flows out of the hills and is then met by Scarth River. From the Cub Hills, the river travels in a south-easterly direction, being met by several other tributaries, including McDougal Creek, South Mossy River, and Brougham Creek, on its way to one of North America's largest inland fresh water deltas, the Saskatchewan River Delta.

== Brook trout ==
Brook trout were successfully introduced to Mossy River in 1979 and became naturalised. Brook trout were first introduced to the Cub Hills in 1934 with the stocking of McDougal Creek, a tributary of Mossy River, and Lost Echo Creek. Since then, the fish have been introduced to 25 rivers in the hills with five of those rivers now supporting populations of naturalised, self-sustaining feral brook trout. The other rivers include Nipekamew Creek and White Gull Creek. All seven of Saskatchewan's trout species can be found in the Cub Hills.

== See also ==
- List of rivers of Saskatchewan
- Hudson Bay drainage basin
