= Little Bear Lake =

Lake in Saskatchewan, Canada

- Location in Saskatchewan Little Bear Lake (Canada)
- Location: Northern Administration District, Saskatchewan
- Coordinates: 54°20′N 104°35′W
- Part of: Saskatchewan River drainage basin
- River sources: Cub Hills
- Basin countries: Canada
- Surface area: 1,742.24 ha (4,305.2 acres)
- Max. depth: 44.2 m (145 ft)
- Shore length^{1}: 56.18 km (34.91 mi)
- Surface elevation: 634 m (2,080 ft)
- Settlements: None
- ^{1} Shore length is not a well-defined measure.

Little Bear Lake is a lake in the boreal forest ecozone in the Canadian province of Saskatchewan. The lake is in a hilly plateau called Cub Hills and the landforms, such as the lakes and streams, of the Cub Hills were formed over 10,000 years ago during the last ice age. Little Bear Lake is accessed from the Hanson Lake Road, which runs along the eastern side of the lake, and by a small airport called Little Bear Lake Airport.

Little Bear Lake is a lake in a glacier formed valley that runs diagonally from the south-west to the north-east. A large portion of the northern end of the lake is called Clark Bay. The lake is fed by several small creeks and rivers along its length. At the southern end, a creek from Divide Lake flows into the lake at Little Bear Lake Resort. Divide Lake is a small bifurcation lake in Narrow Hills Provincial Park that the north flowing outlet goes to Little Bear Lake and the larger south flowing outlet is the source of McDougal Creek.

The outflow for Little Bear Lake is at the north end of Clark Bay, where a short river flows out and into Heart Lake. The outflow for Heart Lake continues north and meets up with the east flowing Bear River, which in turn flows into the Ballantyne River, an inflow for Deschambault Lake.

== Parks and recreation ==
The extreme southern tip of Little Bear Lake is in Narrow Hills Provincial Park. On the south-eastern shore of the lake is Little Bear Lake Resort, which features a scuba diving club that operates off a barge in summer. The airport is located adjacent to the resort.

Just to the north of the resort is a provincial recreation campground called Little Bear Lake Recreation Site (54.3011°N 104.6710°W). The campground features electric and non-electric sites and a sandy beach. There is also a boat launch, fuel, and a store.

== Fish species ==
Fish commonly found in Little Bear Lake include northern pike, lake trout, walleye, whitefish, burbot, and perch. The surrounding lakes also contain rainbow trout, brook trout, tiger trout, brown trout, and splake.

== See also ==
- List of lakes of Saskatchewan
- Tourism in Saskatchewan
