= Whiteswan Lakes =

Lake in Saskatchewan, Canada

- Location in Saskatchewan Whiteswan Lakes (Canada)
- Location: Northern Administration District, Saskatchewan
- Coordinates: 54.1213°N 105.1712°W
- Basin countries: Canada
- Surface area: 5,588 ha (13,810 acres)
- Max. depth: 40.6 m (133 ft)
- Shore length^{1}: 65.9 km (40.9 mi)
- Surface elevation: 591 m (1,939 ft)
- Islands: Hovdebo Island
- ^{1} Shore length is not a well-defined measure.

Whiteswan Lakes are a group of lakes in the Canadian province of Saskatchewan. The lakes are in the boreal forest ecozone west of the Cub Hills. At the southern end of the lakes, on Whelan Bay, is a provincial recreation site and a resort with lodging, camping, and recreational access to the lakes.

The Whiteswan Lakes are in the Northern Saskatchewan Administration District and are central to three nearby provincial parks: Narrow Hills Provincial Park to the east, Clarence-Steepbank Lakes Provincial Park to the north, and Candle Lake Provincial Park to the south. Access to the lakes is from Saskatchewan Highway 913.

== Whiteswan Lake (Whelan Bay) Recreation Site ==
Whiteswan Lake (Whelan Bay) Recreation Site (54.0326°N 105.1087°W) is a provincial recreation site at the southern end of the Whiteswan Lakes on Whelan Bay. The park includes the neighbouring Pinkney Lake and encompasses the Whiteswan Lake Resort. The resort has access to the lakes for scuba diving, swimming, boating, and fishing. There is a licensed restaurant and accommodations include cabins, RV sites, and wilderness campsites. Activities include hiking, ATVing, and, in the winter, 172 kilometres (107 mi) of snowmobile trails.

== Fish species ==
Fish commonly found in the Whiteswan Lakes include lake trout, yellow perch, and northern pike. The lakes are regularly stocked with lake trout.

== See also ==
- List of lakes of Saskatchewan
- Tourism in Saskatchewan
