= Piprell Lake =

Lake in Saskatchewan, Canada

- Location in Saskatchewan Piprell Lake (Canada)
- Location: Northern Administration District, Saskatchewan
- Coordinates: 54.1401°N 104.9040°W
- Part of: Churchill River drainage basin
- River sources: Cub Hills
- Basin countries: Canada
- Surface area: 133.7 ha (330 acres)
- Max. depth: 20 m (66 ft)
- Shore length^{1}: 10.87 km (6.75 mi)
- Surface elevation: 602 m (1,975 ft)
- ^{1} Shore length is not a well-defined measure.

Piprell Lake is a lake in the Canadian province of Saskatchewan in the boreal forest ecozone of Canada. The lake is located in the Northern Administration District, just south of the geographical centre of Saskatchewan in the Cub Hills. It is west of the western boundary of Narrow Hills Provincial Park and south-east of Clarence-Steepbank Lakes Provincial Park

Piprell Lake Recreation Site and Rainbow Lodge are situated at the northern end of the lake and its amenities are accessed from Highway 913. The lake was named after Gordon Leslie Piprell who was killed during World War II.

== Piprell Lake Recreation Site ==
Piprell Lake Recreation Site (54.1546°N 104.9023°W) is a provincial recreation area at the northern end of Piprell Lake. The recreation site has a campground, playground, boat launch, central shower and washroom facility, and a grocery store. There is a picnic area and beach access for swimming. Nearby are trails for hiking and ATVing and in the winter, for snowmobiling.

Surrounded by the park is Rainbow Lodge. It has five modern, three to four-bedroom chalets with full plumbing and satellite TV, along with waterfront cabins for rent.

The whole park is well treed and the lake is stocked with fish for angling in the summer and ice fishing in the winter.

== Fish species ==
Piprell Lake is stocked with tiger trout, splake, and brown trout. The lake was last stocked with 10,000 splake fingerlings and 10,000 tiger trout fingerlings in 2023.

== See also ==
- List of lakes of Saskatchewan
- List of protected areas of Saskatchewan
- Tourism in Saskatchewan
- Hudson Bay drainage basin
