= Saskatchewan Highway 932 =

Provincial highway in Saskatchewan, Canada

Highway 932
- Cub Lake Trail

Route information
- Maintained by Ministry of Highways and Infrastructure
- Length: 20.0 km (12.4 mi)

Major junctions
- South end: Highway 920 at Narrow Hills Provincial Park
- North end: Highway 106

Location
- Country: Canada
- Province: Saskatchewan

Highway system
- Provincial highways in Saskatchewan
← Highway 931	→ Highway 933

Highway 932, also known as Cub Lake Trail, is a provincial highway in the north-east region of the Canadian province of Saskatchewan. It runs from Highway 106 to Highway 920. It is about 20 kilometres (12 mi) long.

== See also ==
- Roads in Saskatchewan
- Transportation in Saskatchewan
