= Whale River =

River in northeastern Quebec, Canada

Coordinates: 58°15′21″N 67°37′0″W

The Whale River (French: Rivière à la Baleine) is a river in northeastern Quebec, Canada. It flows from Lake Manereuille northwest into Ungava Bay. Its major tributaries are the Wheeler and the Savalette.

== See also ==
- List of rivers of Quebec
- Hudson Bay drainage basin
