= Saskatchewan Highway 963 =

Provincial highway in Saskatchewan, Canada

Highway 963
- MacDonnell Lake Road

Route information
- Maintained by Ministry of Highways and Infrastructure
- Length: 15 km (9.3 mi)

Major junctions
- East end: Highway 913
- West end: Meeyomoot Road

Location
- Country: Canada
- Province: Saskatchewan

Highway system
- Provincial highways in Saskatchewan
← Highway 962	→ Highway 964

Highway 963, also known as MacDonnell Lake Road, is a provincial highway in the Canadian province of Saskatchewan. It runs from Highway 913 until it transitions into Meeyomoot Road, a local road. It is about 15 kilometres (9.3 mi) long.

== See also ==
- Roads in Saskatchewan
- Transportation in Saskatchewan
