= Dragline Channel =

Channel in Saskatchewan, Canada

- Location in Saskatchewan Dragline Channel (Canada)
- Location: Northern Saskatchewan Administration District
- Coordinates: 53.8273°N 102.9219°W
- Type: Channel
- Part of: Saskatchewan River Delta
- Primary inflows: Old Saskatchewan River Channel
- Primary outflows: Cut Beaver River
- Basin countries: Canada
- Managing agency: Ducks Unlimited Canada
- Built: 1930s
- Settlements: None

Dragline Channel is a man-made channel in the Canadian province of Saskatchewan. Originally built by the Hudson's Bay Company in the 1930s, it connects the Old Saskatchewan River Channel to Cut Beaver River at the western end of the Cumberland Marshes. Cut Beaver is a tributary of the Birch River, which in turn is a tributary of the Carrot River. The Dragline Channel connects the Saskatchewan River to the Carrot River watershed. The Carrot River joins the Saskatchewan River downstream, just west of The Pas in Manitoba.

== History ==
In the 1930s, the Hudson's Bay Company leased 130,000 hectares (320,000 acres) from the Saskatchewan government in the Cumberland Marshes. The Cumberland Marshes, also known as the Saskatchewan River Delta, is one of the largest inland deltas in North America. The lease was bounded by the Dragline Channel on the west, Old Saskatchewan River Channel on the north, Birch River on the south, and the Manitoba border on the east. The channel was constructed as part of a greater project by the Hudson's Bay Company to control water levels in the marsh to increase wildlife, specifically the muskrat for the fur trade. The project involved the building of a dam on the Birch River (downstream from Cut Beaver River), the building of Dragline Channel to supply the water, and a series of ditches and small water control structures within the system to distribute the water.

In 1960, with the fur trade no longer economically viable enough to justify the upkeep and the needed upgrades to the system, the Hudson's Bay Company gave Ducks Unlimited Canada a 15-year lease over the land. The first thing Ducks Unlimited did was build a major control structure farther downstream on the Birch River, which greatly increased the stored water volume. Ducks Unlimited then built a structure on Dragline Channel to regulate water flows. In 1975, when the 15-year lease expired, the Hudson's Bay Company surrendered the lease rights to Ducks Unlimited, at which point Ducks Unlimited entered into an agreement with the province of Saskatchewan to maintain the land.

== Dragline Channel Recreation Site ==
Dragline Channel Recreation Site (53.8332°N 102.9437°W) is a 30-hectare (74-acre) provincial recreation site at the spot where Dragline Channel connects to the Saskatchewan River. The small park has free camping and access to the river and channel. Access to the site is from Highway 123.

== See also ==
- Saskatchewan River fur trade
- List of protected areas of Saskatchewan
- Tourism in Saskatchewan
