= Saskatchewan Highway 933 =

Provincial highway in Saskatchewan, Canada

Highway 933

Route information
- Maintained by Ministry of Highways and Infrastructure
- Length: 10 km (6.2 mi)

Major junctions
- South end: Highway 920
- North end: Highway 106

Location
- Country: Canada
- Province: Saskatchewan

Highway system
- Provincial highways in Saskatchewan
← Highway 932	→ Highway 934

Highway 933 is a provincial highway in the Canadian province of Saskatchewan. It runs from Highway 106 until it transitions into Highway 920. It is about 10 kilometres (6.2 mi) long.

== See also ==
- Roads in Saskatchewan
- Transportation in Saskatchewan
