= Kovik River =

Kovik River Kovic River, Rivière Kovik
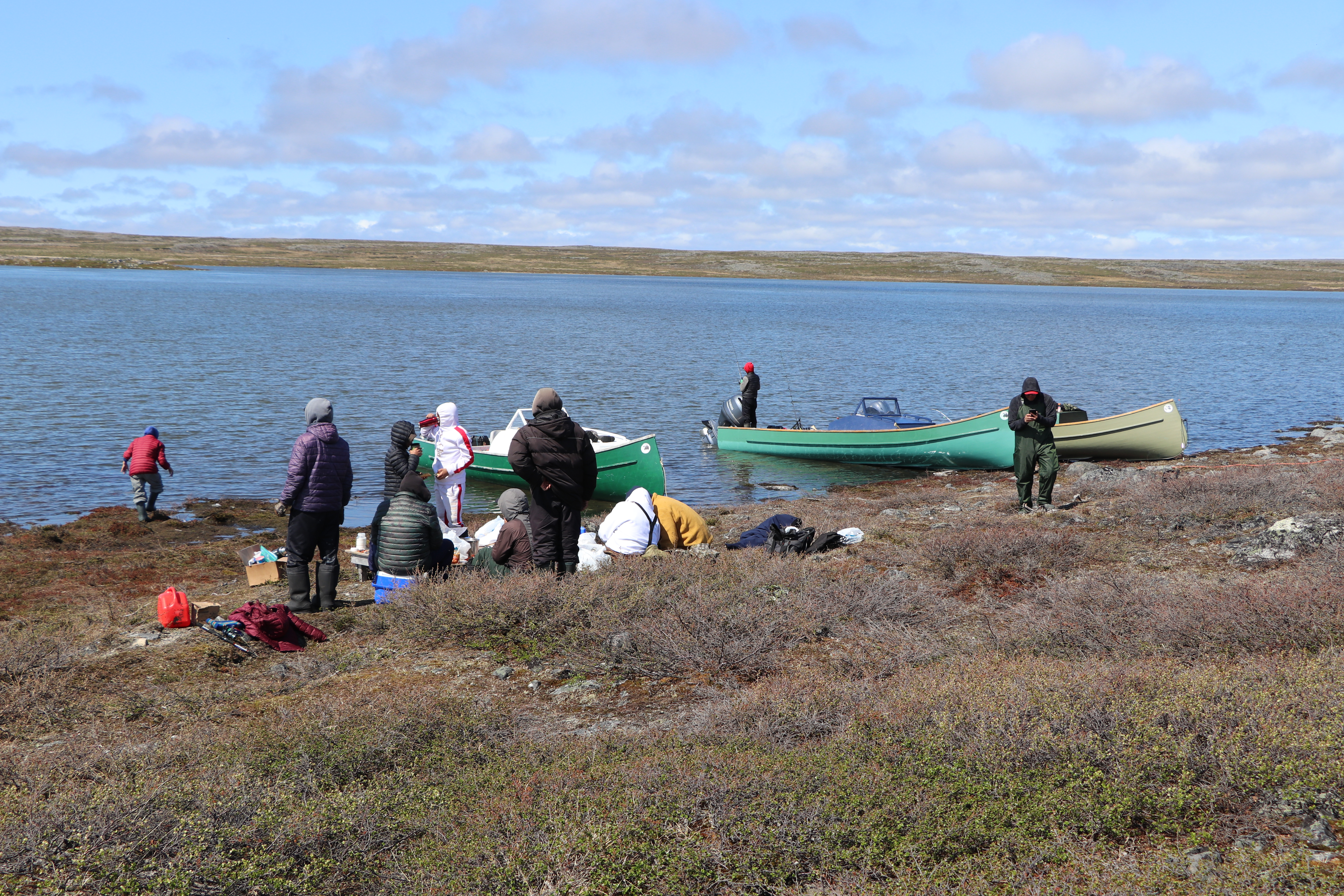

- Location of the mouth of the Kovik River in Quebec.

Location
- Country: Canada
- Province: Quebec
- Region: Nunavik

Physical characteristics
- Source: Lake Vanasse
  - coordinates: 61°48′16″N 75°36′15″W
  - elevation: 325 m (1,066 ft)
- Mouth: Hudson Bay
  - coordinates: 61°35′25″N 77°36′18″W
  - elevation: 0 m (0 ft)
- Length: 150 km (93 mi)

Basin features
- Tributaries
  - right: Durouvray River, Derville River

The Kovik River (French: Rivière Kovik) is a river on the Arctic tundra in Nunavik, Quebec, Canada. In some maps and publications name of the river is spelled Kovic.

== Course ==
The river begins at Lake Vanasse about 40 kilometres (25 mi) south of the community of Salluit and flows southeast, then southwest to Lake Belleau, and west to Lake Chassé. It continues west to Lake Maniraq where it takes in the right tributary Derville River, and takes in the right tributary Durouvray River further west, before reaching its mouth at Kovik Bay on Hudson Bay, adjacent to Cape Paalliq and about 90 kilometres (56 mi) north of the community of Akulivik.

== Culture ==
The river is connected with story about Aukkautik. After his son was accidentally killed on a hunting trip, Aukkautik went on a killing rampage. Eventually, he was stabbed to death by another Inuk, before he could cause further pain.

== Tributaries ==
- Durouvray River
- Derville River
