= Smeaton, Saskatchewan =

Village in Saskatchewan, Canada

Coordinates: 53°29′29″N 104°48′39″W

Smeaton (2016 population: 182) is a village in the Canadian province of Saskatchewan within the Rural Municipality of Torch River No. 488 and Census Division No. 14. It is at the foot of Hanson Lake Road, which ends at Creighton near Flin Flon, Manitoba). Narrow Hills Provincial Park is 70 km north.

== History ==
Smeaton incorporated as a village on March 7, 1944.

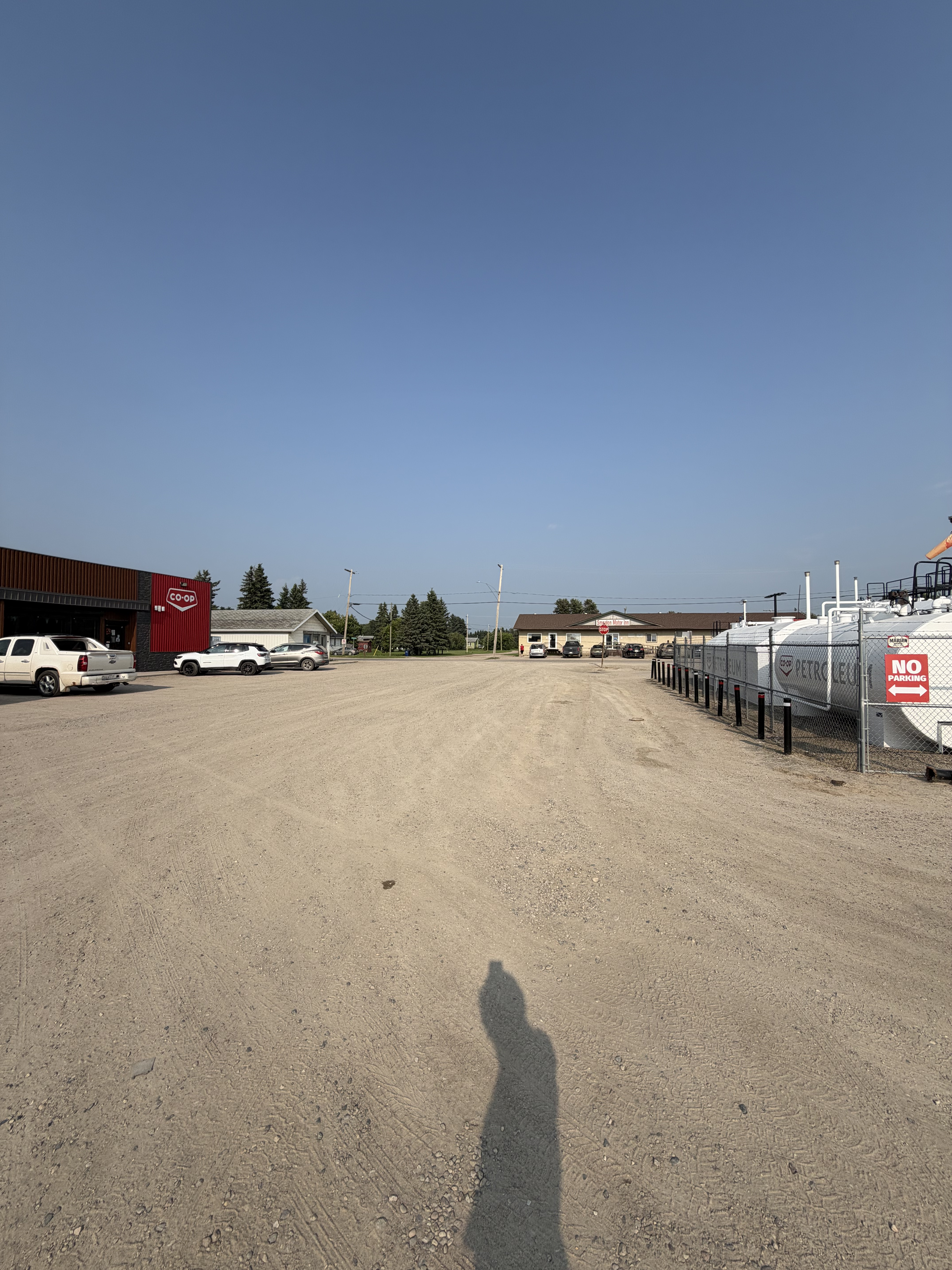
Main road in Smeaton

== Demographics ==
Population history (1981–2016)
Year	Pop.	±%
1981	246	—
1986	300	+22.0%
1991	225	−25.0%
1996	192	−14.7%
2001	178	−7.3%
2006	183	+2.8%
2011	181	−1.1%
2016	182	+0.6%
Source: Statistics Canada via Saskatchewan Bureau of Statistics

In the 2021 Census of Population conducted by Statistics Canada, Smeaton had a population of 163 living in 69 of its 81 total private dwellings, a change of −10.4% from its 2016 population of 182. With a land area of 1.46 km^{2} (0.56 sq mi), it had a population density of 111.6/km^{2} (289.2/sq mi) in 2021.

In the 2016 Census of Population, the Village of Smeaton recorded a population of 182 living in 73 of its 90 total private dwellings, a 0.5% change from its 2011 population of 181. With a land area of 1.48 km^{2} (0.57 sq mi), it had a population density of 123.0/km^{2} (318.5/sq mi) in 2016.

== See also ==
- List of francophone communities in Saskatchewan
