= Upper Fishing Lake =

Lake in Saskatchewan, Canada

- Location in Saskatchewan Upper Fishing Lake (Canada)
- Location: Narrow Hills Provincial Park, Saskatchewan
- Coordinates: 54.0567°N 104.6603°W
- Part of: Saskatchewan River drainage basin
- Primary inflows: Caribou Creek
- Primary outflows: Caribou Creek
- Basin countries: Canada
- Surface area: 51 ha (130 acres)
- Max. depth: 14.91 m (48.9 ft)
- Shore length^{1}: 5.3 km (3.3 mi)
- Surface elevation: 499 m (1,637 ft)
- ^{1} Shore length is not a well-defined measure.

Upper Fishing Lake is a lake in the east-central part of the Canadian province of Saskatchewan in Narrow Hills Provincial Park. It is situated in a glacier-formed valley in the Cub Hills and the boreal forest ecozone of Canada. It is north-west of the larger Lower Fishing Lake along the course of Caribou Creek and is accessed from the Hanson Lake Road.

== Description ==
Caribou Creek and Upper Fishing Lake's other inflow, a river that flows south from Stickley Lake, flow into the lake at its north-western point. Caribou Creek flows out of the lake at its south-eastern point. The Fishing Lakes Fire of 1977 burned much of the region upstream and around the lake. As a result, the area is now dominated by jack pine, which is a tree species that is well adapted fire burned forests. At the south-east corner of the lake, near where Caribou Creek flows out, is Caribou Creek Lodge. The lodge is accessed from Hanson Lake Road and features a motel, cabins, a dining room, fuel, and a convenience store.

== Fish species ==
Fish commonly found in Upper Fishing Lake include northern pike and walleye. The lake was last stocked with 50,000 walleye fry in 2019.

== See also ==
- List of lakes of Saskatchewan
- List of protected areas of Saskatchewan
- Tourism in Saskatchewan
