= Torch River (Saskatchewan) =

River in Saskatchewan, Canada

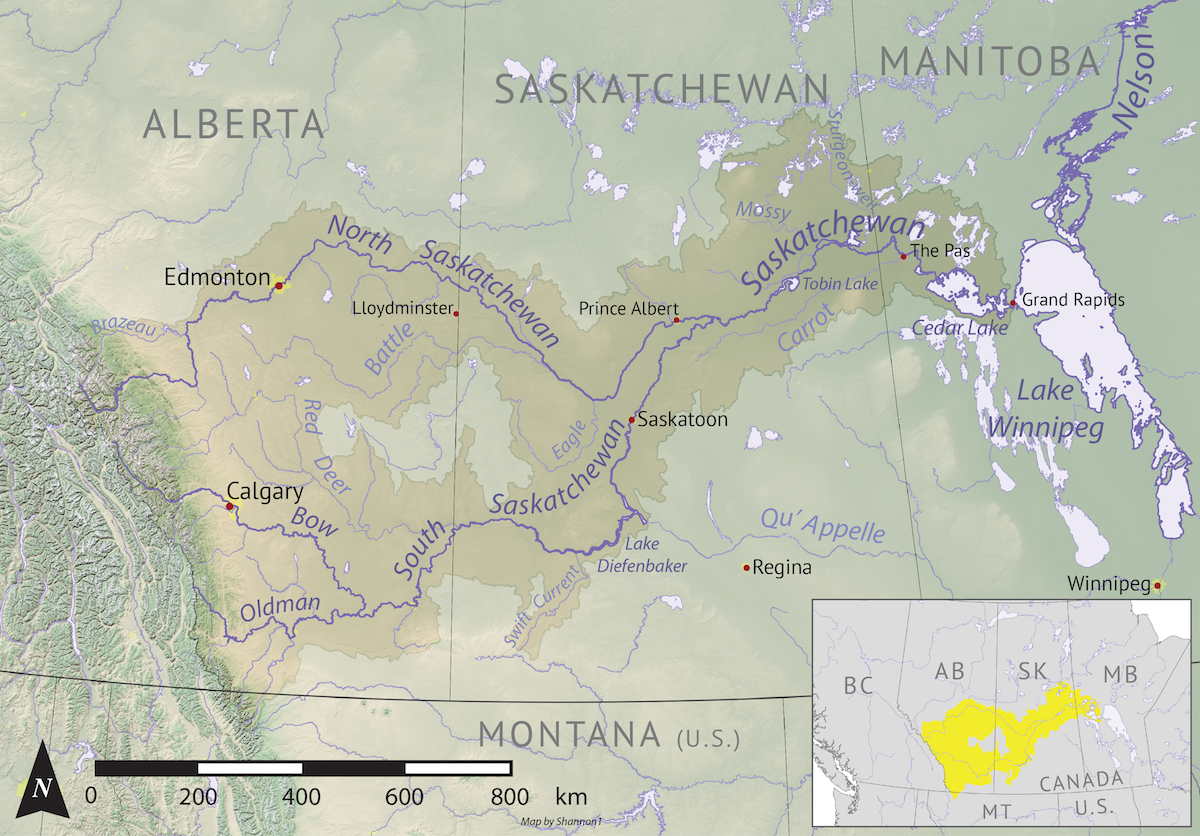
- Map of Saskatchewan River drainage basin

- Location of the mouth in Saskatchewan Torch River (Saskatchewan) (Canada)

Location
- Country: Canada
- Province: Saskatchewan

Physical characteristics
- Source
  - location: Candle Lake
  - coordinates: 53.7591°N 105.1584°W
  - elevation: 491 m (1,611 ft)
- Mouth: Saskatchewan River
  - location: Saskatchewan River Delta
  - coordinates: 53.8610°N 103.0962°W
  - elevation: 273 m (896 ft)
- Length: 150 km (93 mi)

Basin features
- River system: Nelson River
- Tributaries
  - left: White Gull Creek, Stewart Creek, Missipuskiow River
  - right: White Fox River

Torch River is a river in the Canadian province of Saskatchewan. The river's source is the dam at Candle Lake, near Candle Lake Provincial Park, and it travels east through boreal forest and muskeg en route to its mouth in the Saskatchewan River Delta. Torch River Provincial Forest, a conservation area, is located along the course of the river, near where White Fox River flows into Torch River. Torch River is a significant tributary of the Saskatchewan River and it is part of the Hudson Bay drainage basin.

== Description ==
The Torch River is a tributary of the Saskatchewan River and it flows into one of North America's largest inland fresh water deltas, the Saskatchewan River Delta. The river begins at the south-east corner of Candle Lake from a dam at Hanson Bay near Minowakaw Beach Campground in the RM of Paddockwood No. 520. The dam is a 3.1-metre high concrete dam that was constructed in 1978–1979 and is operated by the Saskatchewan Watershed Authority. Less than a mile after the river starts, it crosses Highway 120, leaves the RM of Paddockwood, and enters the RM of Torch River No. 488.

It travels in a generally eastward direction through muskeg and boreal forest and along the way, it is joined by several tributaries, including White Gull Creek, Stewart Creek, White Fox River, and Missipuskiow River and crosses Highway 106 near Fyson Lake. Stewart Creek has its headwaters in the Cub Hills and Narrow Hills Provincial Park. At the confluence of Torch and White Fox Rivers, the course takes it through the Torch River Provincial Forest and as it approaches Tobin Lake, it starts to parallel the Saskatchewan River. As it passes Tobin Lake, it enters into the Northern Saskatchewan Administration District and meets up with the Saskatchewan River downstream shortly thereafter.

=== Tributaries ===
The following is a list of tributaries of Torch River from the upper part of the watershed to the lower part:

- Gull Creek
- Thompson Creek
- White Gull Creek
- Stewart Creek
  - Caribou Creek
- Falling Horse Creek
- Bailey Creek
- White Fox River
  - Howard Creek
  - Loon River
  - Bisset Creek
    - Bedard Creek
  - Fern Creek
  - Kelsey Creek
- Missipuskiow River
- Adams Creek

== See also ==
- List of rivers of Saskatchewan
- Hudson Bay drainage basin
