= Saskatchewan Highway 912 =

Provincial highway in Saskatchewan, Canada

Highway 912

Route information
- Maintained by Ministry of Highways and Infrastructure
- Length: 101 km (63 mi)

Major junctions
- South end: Highway 913 near Narrow Hills Provincial Park
- Highway 927; Highway 165; Highway 934
- North end: Lac La Ronge Provincial Park

Location
- Country: Canada
- Province: Saskatchewan

Highway system
- Provincial highways in Saskatchewan
← Highway 911	→ Highway 913

Highway 912, also known as Wapawekka Lake Road, is a provincial highway in the north-east region of Saskatchewan, Canada. It runs from Highway 913 near Narrow Hills Provincial Park to a dead end just within the borders of the Lac La Ronge Provincial Park. It is about 101 kilometres (63 mi) long.

In 2025, the bridge carrying Highway 912 across Stuart Creek near East Trout Lake was replaced at a cost of $1.2 million. The bridge was destroyed by the 2025 Shoe Fire in Saskatchewan.

== See also ==
- Roads in Saskatchewan
- Transportation in Saskatchewan
