= Saskatchewan Highway 920 =

Provincial highway in Saskatchewan, Canada

Highway 920

Route information
- Maintained by Ministry of Highways and Infrastructure
- Length: 40.0 km (24.9 mi)

Major junctions
- South end: Highway 106 / Highway 120 in Narrow Hills Provincial Park
- North end: Highway 933

Location
- Country: Canada
- Province: Saskatchewan

Highway system
- Provincial highways in Saskatchewan
← Highway 919	→ Highway 921

Highway 920 is a provincial highway in the north-east region of the Canadian province of Saskatchewan. It runs from Narrow Hills Provincial Park until it transitions into Highway 933. The highway is closed between the McDougal Creek and Mossy River crossings. It is about 40 kilometres (25 mi) long.

Highway 920 also connects with Highway 120 and Highway 932.

== See also ==
- Roads in Saskatchewan
- Transportation in Saskatchewan
