= Splake =

Scientific classification
- Kingdom: Animalia
- Phylum: Chordata
- Class: Actinopterygii
- Division: Teleostei
- Order: Salmoniformes
- Family: Salmonidae
- Subfamily: Salmoninae
- Genus: Salvelinus
- Species: S. fontinalis♂ × S. namaycush♀

Hybrid species of ray-finned fish

The splake or slake (Salvelinus namaycush × Salvelinus fontinalis) is a hybrid of two fish species resulting from the crossing of a male brook trout (Salvelinus fontinalis) and a female lake trout (Salvelinus namaycush). The name itself is a portmanteau of speckled trout (another name for brook trout) and lake trout, and may have been used to describe such hybrids as early as the 1880s. Hybrids of the male lake trout with the female brook trout (the so-called "brookinaw") have also been produced, but are not as successful.

The intrageneric hybrid is of the genus Salvelinus and, hence, is most properly known as a char or charr. In some locales, the fish is referred to as the wendigo. Although the hybrid is genetically stable and is, theoretically, capable of reproducing, splake reproduction is uncommon, for behavioral reasons, outside the hatchery environment. However, in some instances splake have back-crossed with parent species that inhabit the same waters, and create a self-sustaining population of splake backcrosses. This has been documented in several instances in Wyoming and the Intermountain West, notably Hog Park Reservoir, Wyoming where Splake were accidentally stocked once in the 1980s and the population still exists today through spawning and back-crossing with Brook Trout that are also found in the watershed.. Because splake typically do not reproduce just as other hybrid fish, they are used as a sport fish in many lakes across the US. Fishery managers are able to control populations numbers due to the extremely poor spawning success rate.

== Description ==
The fish possesses characteristics of both parent species. Splake in some instances can exhibit higher growth rates than either parent species (under ideal circumstances) and can attain 46 cm (18 in) in length only two years after being planted as fingerlings (i.e., at 2½ years of age). By way of contrast, lacustrine brook trout would approach 25 cm (10 in) in length at a similar age and similarly aged lake trout would be expected to be less than 40 cm (16 in) long. The maximum size is about 9 kg (20 lb), but fish over 4 kg (9 lb) are very rare and are considered trophies.

In the Intermountain West, Splake grow much slower and live a very long time, with fish approaching 30 years old recorded in Wyoming. Since Splake are a hybrid, they can inherit more DNA from one parent species vs. the other, and subsequently have behavior, growth, and appearance more like the parent species that they inherit more traits from. This often leads to some fish being more drab, living in deeper water, and living longer lives like a Lake Trout, and in contrast, some fish living more shallow lives, with bright colors and behaving more like Brook Trout. This can also be apparent when looking at external morphology, particularly the caudal fin. Splake are capable of having a forked tail like a Lake Trout, a relatively square tail like a Brook Trout, or an intermediate tail. In recent years, this behavior difference has been well documented in Lake Superior, where stocked Splake were tracked during spawning and a near 50/50 split occurred, where half of the splake went into shallow tributaries to spawn with Brook Trout, and the other half went to deep reefs to spawn with Lake Trout.

== Recreation ==
Splake are considered "easier to catch" than other salmonids and often live longer and fare better in certain situations. Hence, splake are well suited for stocking in a variety of cold-water lakes and ponds, as such, northern states such as Maine hold annual seasons for stocked splake.

== Stocking ==
Since Splake are one of the most fertile hybrid fish species with evidence of backcrossing also occurring in the study, researchers were concerened. Backcrossing of Splake with parent species in Lake Superior could ultimately lead to a drastically altered gene pool. With these findings, coupled with the recovery of Lake Trout in Lake Superior, Wisconsin DNR made the decision to end Splake stocking in 2025 for Lake Superior. An example would be in Ontario, where both F1 splake and the lake trout backcross have been planted for several years. The backcross is the result of an F1 splake male being crossed with a female lake trout (i.e., 75% lake trout and 25% brook trout).

Although splake were first described in 1880, Ontario began experimenting with the hybrids in the 1960s in an effort to replace collapsed lake trout stocks in the Great Lakes. Due to mediocre results, the experiment never really progressed beyond Georgian Bay. The theory was that splake would grow more quickly and mature sooner than lake trout with the hope that they would be able to reproduce before being attacked by the invasive sea lamprey. Unfortunately, although splake are relatively unusual among hybrids in that they are fertile, fertility in nature is behaviorally problematic—very few natural progeny are produced by introduced splake populations.

After some experimentation in the late 1970s, stocking in the Great Lakes and, especially, in Georgian Bay, was converted entirely to the so-called lake trout backcross in the early 1980s. Although the backcross program did succeed in creating some localized angling opportunities, it never achieved any degree of success in terms of natural reproduction—the backcross was only marginally better at reproducing than the F1 splake. The F1 splake has proved to be a success, however, in providing angling opportunities in smaller lakes and most of the planting of splake in Ontario now goes to those situations. In the first of two cases, former brook trout waters which have become infested with spiny-rayed fish to the point where they no longer produce brook trout are stocked with splake. The splake grow more quickly than wild-strain brook trout and become piscivorous at a younger age and, hence, are more tolerant of competitors than brook trout. In the second case, relatively small lake trout lakes that experienced poor recruitment due to insufficient deep-water juvenile lake trout habitat will support fairly good splake fisheries, since splake are less dependent on extreme deep water than the lake trout and they grow more quickly, providing a better return to anglers. In both cases, due to the behavioral sterility of splake, the fisheries are entirely dependent on artificial propagation.
