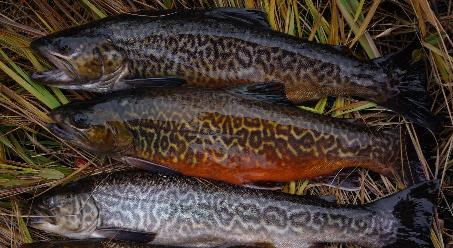

Scientific classification
- Kingdom: Animalia
- Phylum: Chordata
- Class: Actinopterygii
- Division: Teleostei
- Order: Salmoniformes
- Family: Salmonidae
- Subfamily: Salmoninae
- Hybrid: Salmo trutta × Salvelinus fontinalis

= Tiger trout =

Hybrid fish

The tiger trout (Salmo trutta × Salvelinus fontinalis) is a sterile, intergeneric hybrid of the brown trout (Salmo trutta) and the brook trout (Salvelinus fontinalis). Pronounced vermiculations in the fish's patterning gave rise to its name, evoking the stripes of a tiger. Tiger trout are a rare anomaly in the wild, as the parent species are relatively distantly related, being members of different genera and possessing mismatched numbers of chromosomes. However, specialized hatchery rearing techniques are able to produce tiger trout reliably enough to meet the demands of stocking programs.

== Natural occurrence ==
Prior to the 19th century, naturally occurring tiger trout were an impossibility, as the native range of brown trout in Eurasia and brook trout in North America do not overlap and the species could therefore never have encountered one another in the wild. When the widespread stocking of non-native gamefish began in the 1800s, brown trout and brook trout began establishing wild populations alongside each other in some places and the opportunity for hybridization in the wild arose. Instances of stream-born tiger trout were recorded in the United States at least as early as 1944 and, despite being exceptionally rare, they've been documented numerous times during the 20th and 21st centuries.

Tiger trout result exclusively from the fertilization of brown trout eggs with brook trout milt, as brook trout eggs are generally too small to be successfully fertilized by brown trout milt. Tigers are known as intergeneric hybrids as the two parent species share only a relatively distant relationship, belonging to different genera within the Salmon family. In fact, brook trout and brown trout have non-matching numbers of chromosomes, with the former possessing 84 and the latter 80. Consequently, even in cases in which brown trout eggs are fertilized by brook trout in the wild, most of these eggs develop improperly and fail to yield any young.

== Hatchery rearing ==
Tiger trout can be produced reliably in hatcheries and they have been incorporated into stocking programs in the United States at least as early as the 1960s. Hatchery productivity is enhanced by heat shocking the fertilized hybrid eggs, causing the creation of an extra set of chromosomes which increases survival rates from 5% to 85%. Tiger trout have been reported to grow faster than natural species, though this assessment is not universal. They are also known to be highly piscivorous and are consequently a useful control against rough fish populations. This, along with their desirability as novel gamefish, means tigers have continued to be popular with many fish stocking programs. Several US states and Canadian provinces engage in tiger trout stocking programs.

== See also ==
- Splake
