= Saskatchewan River Delta =

Inland river delta in Western Canada

Coordinates: 53°27′9″N 100°37′28″W

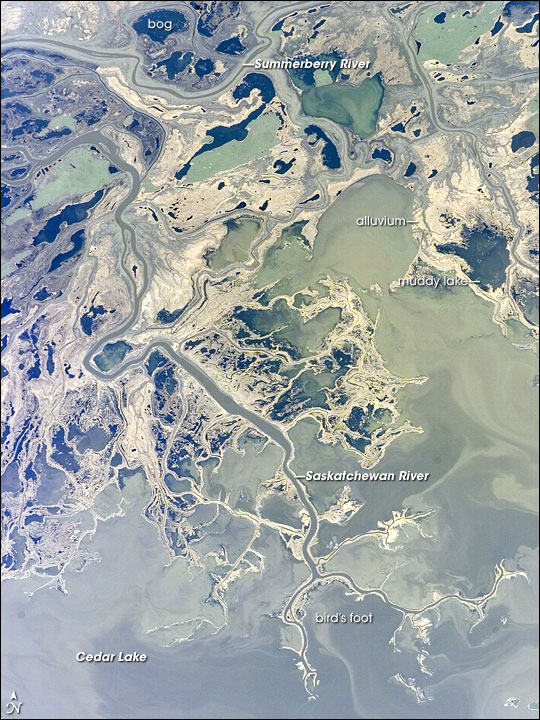
May 11, 2007 NASA photo of a portion of the Saskatchewan River delta

The Saskatchewan River Delta (SRD), also known as Cumberland Marshes, is a large alluvial delta that straddles the border of the provinces of Saskatchewan and Manitoba in Western Canada. Currently terminating at Cedar Lake, Manitoba, the delta is composed mainly of various types of wetlands, shallow lakes, and active and abandoned river channels bordered by forested natural levees. Sixty-five percent of the delta is occupied by vegetated wetlands, over one third of which comprise peat-forming fens and bogs. Geographically, the SRD consists of two parts – western and eastern – separated by a prominent moraine (The Pas Moraine) that was deposited by the Laurentide Ice Sheet during late stages of the Wisconsinan glacial epoch. These two components, commonly termed the "upper delta" and "lower delta", together occupy an area of approximately 10,000 km^{2} (3,900 sq mi) making the SRD one of the largest active inland deltas in North America. The broad wetland tracts of the upper delta in Saskatchewan are sometimes referred to as the Cumberland Marshes. Approximately 5% of the delta surface has been drained for agricultural use following feasibility studies by the Prairie Farm Rehabilitation Administration in the 1950s.

The SRD is fed mainly by the Saskatchewan River, whose drainage basin extends westward to the continental divide and includes the eastern slopes of the Canadian Rocky Mountains and much of the high plains region of southern Alberta and Saskatchewan. The Saskatchewan River sensu stricto begins at the confluence of its two main tributaries, the North and South Saskatchewan Rivers, 175 kilometres (109 mi) upstream from the head of the SRD. Approximately 80% of the flow to the delta comes from the Saskatchewan River whereas the other 20% is supplied by smaller streams that enter the SRD at its margins. These include the Torch, Mossy, Grassberry, Sturgeon-Weir, Carrot, and Pasquia Rivers. Most of the SRD is uninhabited, but approximately 15,000 people live in scattered communities around its perimeter, about two-thirds comprising Metis and First Nations peoples and one-third Euro-Canadian. Principal communities, including associated Indian reserves, are The Pas, Moose Lake, and Cormorant (in Manitoba) and Cumberland House, Red Earth, and Shoal Lake (in Saskatchewan). Well over half of the delta population resides in and near The Pas, situated on The Pas Moraine between the upper and lower deltas.

== Geological and human history ==
Like all deltas, the SRD formed by deposition of river-borne sediment into a standing body of water. Early stages of SRD development began some 10,000–11,000 years ago where the east-flowing Saskatchewan River entered the western shore of former Glacial Lake Agassiz, an enormous meltwater lake formed at the margins of the Laurentide Ice Sheet as it receded to the northeast. The delta expanded eastward as the lake shallowed by glacial rebound, eventually exposing the earlier – formed The Pas Moraine between 8,200 and 8,700 years ago. Channel incision of the moraine followed, establishing through-flow of the Saskatchewan River and initiation of the lower delta. Growth of both the upper and lower components of the SRD has continued to the present, but now mostly by expansion of the lower delta into Cedar Lake, a remnant of Glacial Lake Agassiz, and to a lesser extent the delta of the Mossy River at Cumberland Lake north of Cumberland House.

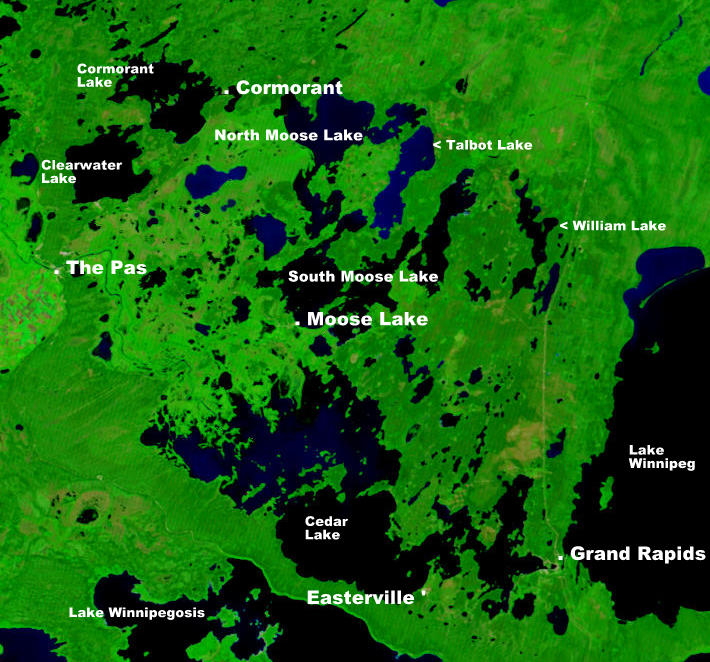
NASA image of the lower delta and nearby lakes

As the SRD developed through time, the principal channels of the Saskatchewan River frequently changed courses (avulsed) as part of the normal process of delta evolution. In the upper delta alone, at least nine major avulsions have occurred in the past 5,400 years. Remnants of these avulsions can be observed today as partly or wholly abandoned channels scattered over the delta surface. The most recent avulsion, initiated in the 1870s, had profound effects on the physiography and ecosystems in the northwestern region of the delta. For example, Cumberland Lake, the largest lake in the SRD, has become shallower – from pre-avulsion depths of over 6 metres (20 ft) to average depths of less than 1.5 metres (4 ft 11 in) today – through sediment infilling following the avulsion. The 1870s event also contributed to the demise of sternwheeler riverboat traffic on the Saskatchewan River in the late 1800s and early 1900s because of difficulties in navigating through the modified channel networks resulting from the diversion. Developmental and avulsion history of the lower delta is more poorly known although evidence of multiple historical channels is apparent from aerial photographs and satellite imagery.

The SRD has a substantial history of pre-European occupation, and it has long served as a travel corridor and location for gathering centres for aboriginal peoples. Because the Saskatchewan River is a major east-west river that connects the Rocky Mountains with the Atlantic Ocean (Hudson Bay, via Lake Winnipeg and the contiguous Nelson River), the SRD saw significant traffic during the 18th and 19th centuries from European exploration, fur trading, and commerce. Cumberland House, initially established in 1774 and now the oldest continuously occupied settlement in Saskatchewan, was a major crossroads of the fur-trading routes developed by the British-based Hudson's Bay Company and the Montreal-based North West Company.

== Habitat and biodiversity ==
The diversity of wetlands in combination with the network of streams, lake ecosystems and terrestrial vegetation, make the Saskatchewan River Delta one of Canada's richest regions for abundance and diversity of wildlife, especially large mammals (moose, elk, white-tailed deer, black bear), fur-bearing mammals (notably muskrat, beaver, mink, otter, fisher, lynx, wolf), fish, waterfowl and other birds. Many of these species are vital to local aboriginal peoples who depend on fishing, hunting and trapping for means of livelihoods. Hunting and sport fishing also provide an important basis for local tourism.

Dirschl and Dabbs documented 231 species of vascular plants and 14 species of bryophytes in the upper SRD. Specific to wetlands, other authors including Scoggan, have identified over 50 species of aquatic (emergent and submerged) plant species. Vertebrate biodiversity is significant and includes over 200 species of breeding birds, 43 species of mammals, 48 species of fish, and 6 species of amphibians and reptiles. Two species, lake sturgeon and the yellow rail, are identified respectively as Endangered Species and a Species of Concern by the Committee on the Status of Endangered Wildlife in Canada (COSEWIC). Lake Sturgeon is currently being considered for listing under the Canadian federal Species at Risk Act (SARA).

The delta is designated an Important Bird Area (IBA) of Canada for its global significance and large concentrations of waterfowl. The Saskatchewan side of the delta is a designated as Cumberland Marshes (SK 102) and the Manitoba side as Saskatchewan River Delta (MB 055). The IBA is home for an estimated half million breeding-season waterfowl each year. The delta also serves as a valuable spring and fall staging area for waterfowl and other water birds travelling to and from the northern boreal and arctic regions. These include tundra swans, snow geese, and Canada geese.

Because of the importance of the Saskatchewan River Delta in supporting healthy populations of aquatic fur bearers, marsh management activities (primarily for muskrats) date back to the 1930s when the Hudson's Bay Company initiated development of the Cumberland Marshes project area near Cumberland House in Saskatchewan. Private (Tom Lamb) and government interests conducted similar activities in Manitoba. Ducks Unlimited Canada (DUC), a private non-profit conservation organization, also developed several wetland management projects dating back to the 1940s. Extensive projects were later undertaken in the 1960s and 1970s following the construction of hydroelectric dams upstream and downstream of the delta. In more recent times, additional management projects have been developed in anticipation of continued habitat degradation. DUC currently manages several wetland areas in the SRD totaling approximately 3,000 km^{2} (1,200 sq mi) under conservation agreements with the two provincial governments, with input and guidance from local advisory committees.

== Environmental issues and concerns ==
The SRD ecosystem is significantly affected by the presence of two large hydroelectric power dams constructed in the 1960s — one downstream of the delta at the outlet of Cedar Lake (Grand Rapids Dam, Manitoba) and another on the Saskatchewan River 25 kilometres (16 mi) upstream of the delta (E.B. Campbell Dam, Saskatchewan). The Grand Rapids Dam raised the surface of Cedar Lake by 3.5 metres (11 ft), modifying water levels in some 2,500 km^{2} (970 sq mi) of the lower delta and enlarging the open-water area of Cedar Lake to approximately 3,500 km^{2} (1,400 sq mi). Lake surface levels typically range between 1.5 and 2 m each year in response to power needs and seasonal discharge variations. Following the development of the Grand Rapids project, the Manitoba government designated portions of the SRD as Wildlife Management Areas in recognition of these environmental impacts and as partial mitigation for habitat loss upstream of the dam.

Most of the water supplying the SRD passes through the E.B. Campbell Dam, which impounds nearly all river-borne sediment entering the reservoir (Tobin Lake) and modifies natural discharge fluctuations such that normally high spring and summer flows are significantly diminished. Removal of sediment outflow by impoundment has caused enlargement of channels downstream of the dam and reduction of sediment-borne nutrients to the delta ecosystem. In addition, suppression of annual discharge peaks has reduced the frequency of overbank flooding and, consequently, the frequency at which water and nutrients are replenished in the delta wetlands. Reduction of peak flows to the delta is exacerbated by the Gardiner Dam on the South Saskatchewan River whose impoundment, Lake Diefenbaker, is nearly five times larger than the Tobin Lake reservoir, with a commensurately larger influence on flow patterns in the SRD. The other principal tributary, the North Saskatchewan River, is relatively little affected by dams.

Flow hydrographs for the Saskatchewan River at The Pas indicate that mean annual discharges have declined approximately 25-30% since records were begun in 1913. This reduction is due in large part to upstream consumption, particularly irrigation projects in the South Saskatchewan River basin where consumption rates have grown significantly over the same time period. A long-term problem for the SRD wetland ecosystem is the prospect of continually declining inflows resulting from increased up-basin water consumption as populations and demands for water resources continue to grow in the future. In addition, the influence of climate change within the Saskatchewan River Basin will have an as yet uncertain impact on the SRD.

Although agricultural reclamation currently affects only a small portion of the SRD, mostly near the Carrot River west of The Pas, modest expansion continues to take place in areas where wetlands have been drained. In the early 1980s, there was interest in expanding reclamation activities northward from the Carrot River in the east-central portion of the upper delta, but no such project has yet been initiated.

Given the multiple jurisdictional (provincial and federal) responsibilities associated with both the Saskatchewan River and the SRD, there is growing concern that resource management and planning decisions affecting the delta will become more difficult to effectively coordinate in the face of increasing environmental stresses, especially declining water supplies. This, in conjunction with increasing interest and expectations by aboriginal communities to become more actively involved in such decisions, has posed the need for more collaborative planning approaches in the future.

== See also ==
- Peace-Athabasca Delta, another freshwater river delta in Western Canada
- Dragline Channel
