= Saskatchewan Highway 913 =

Provincial highway in Saskatchewan, Canada

Highway 913

Route information
- Maintained by Ministry of Highways and Infrastructure
- Length: 65.10 km (40.45 mi)

Major junctions
- South end: Highway 120 south-west of White Gull Lake
- North end: Highway 106 in Narrows Hill Provincial Park

Location
- Country: Canada
- Province: Saskatchewan

Highway system
- Provincial highways in Saskatchewan
← Highway 912	→ Highway 914

Highway 913 is a provincial highway in the Canadian province of Saskatchewan. It runs from Highway 120 to the Hanson Lake Road. The southern terminus of the highway is 9.9 kilometres (6.2 mi) north of Candle Lake Provincial Park, and the northern terminus is within the Narrow Hills Provincial Park and 15.2 kilometres (9.4 mi) north from the Narrow Hills Provincial Park campground area. It is about 65.1 kilometres (40.5 mi) long and connects with Highway 963 and has a concurrency with Highway 912. The highway is gravel for its entire length.

== Route description ==
Highway 913 begins at Highway 120 south of White Gull Lake. From there, it heads north past the western shore of White Gull Lake and the eastern shore of Heritage Lake towards the Whiteswan Lakes. From the Whiteswan Lakes, it turns east towards the Cub Hills. East of Piprell Lake, at the foot of the Cub Hills, the highway intersects with Highway 912. The two roads become concurrent for 5 kilometres (3.1 mi) and head east towards Highway 106 and Narrow Hills Provincial Park. The highway ends in the heart of Narrow Hills Provincial Park.

Parks accessed from Highway 913 include the aforementioned Narrow Hills Provincial, Whiteswan Lake (Whelan Bay) Recreation Site, Heritage Lake Recreation Site, and Piprell Lake Recreation Site.

== Major intersections ==
Rural municipality	Location	km	mi	Destinations	Notes
Northern Saskatchewan Administration District	White Gull Lake	0.00	0.00	Highway 120	Southern terminus of Route 913.
Northern Saskatchewan Administration District	Whiteswan Lake (Whelan Bay) Recreation Site	25.75	41.44	Highway 912	Begin/end concurrency with Route 912.
Northern Saskatchewan Administration District	Whiteswan Lake (Whelan Bay) Recreation Site	30.50	49.08	Highway 912	Begin/end concurrency with Route 912.
Northern Saskatchewan Administration District	Whiteswan Lake (Whelan Bay) Recreation Site	40.68	65.47	Highway 106	Northern terminus of Route 913.
1.000 mi = 1.609 km; 1.000 km = 0.621 mi

== See also ==
- Roads in Saskatchewan
- Transportation in Saskatchewan
