= Narrow Hills Provincial Park =

Provincial park in Saskatchewan, Canada

- IUCN category II (national park)
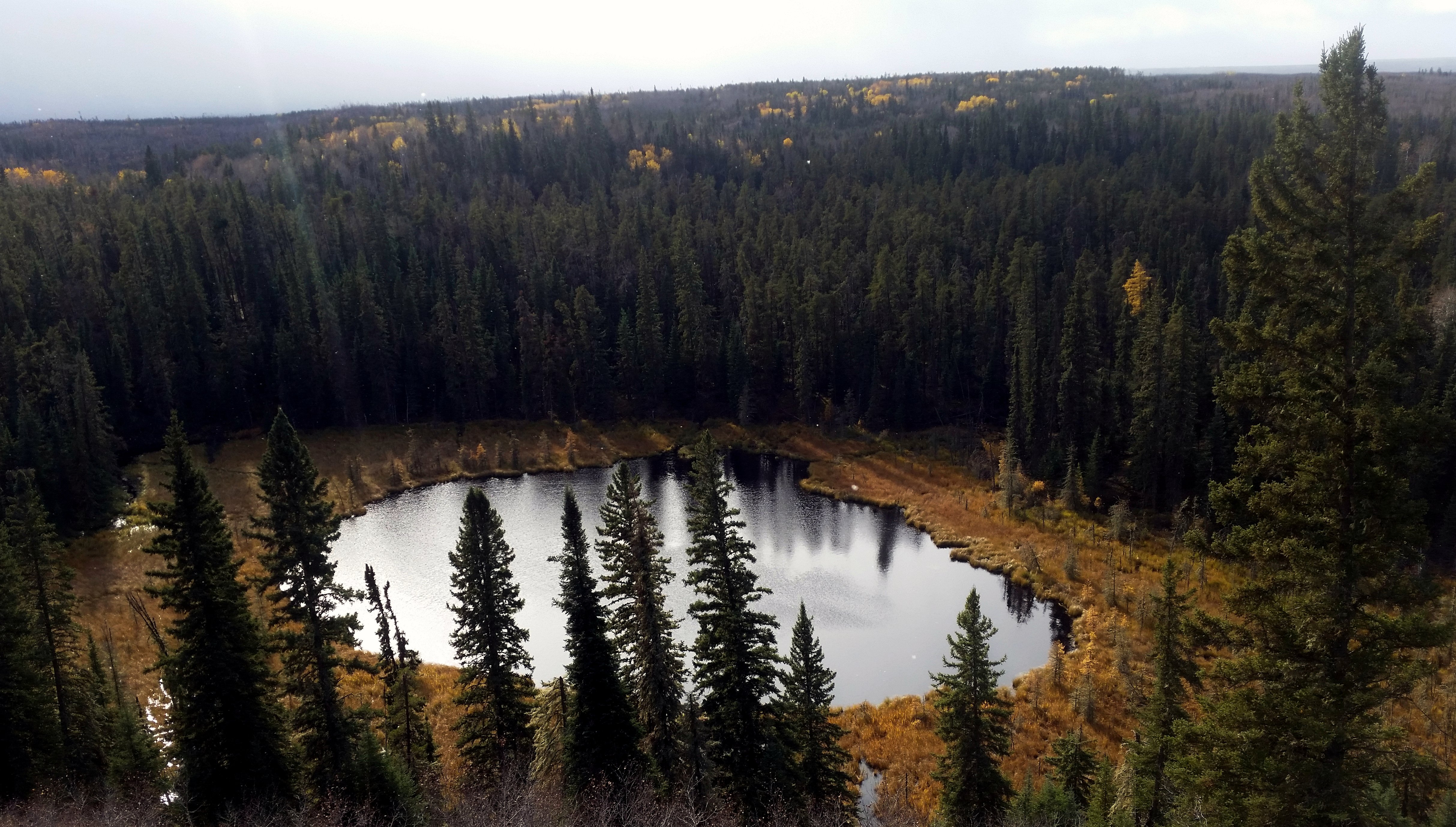
- A small lake on the Narrow Hills scenic drive

- Location within Saskatchewan Location within Canada
- Location: Saskatchewan, Canada
- Nearest town: Smeaton
- Coordinates: 54.1043°N 104.6970°W
- Area: 530 km^{2} (200 sq mi)
- Established: 1934
- Governing body: Sask Parks

Narrow Hills Provincial Park is a northern boreal forest provincial recreational park in the Canadian province of Saskatchewan. It is located in a hilly plateau called the Cub Hills and contains several recreational facilities and over 25 accessible lakes within its boundaries. The geographical features of the park, including the lakes, valleys, and lowlands were formed over 10,000 years ago during the last ice age. The town of Smeaton is the closest community and it is located 70 kilometres (43 mi) to the south.

The park was established in 1934 as Nipawin Provincial Forest (later renamed Nipawin Provincial Park), and was renamed Narrow Hills in the 1990s. The park's boundaries were also changed with the renaming.

Hanson Lake Road, which begins at Smeaton, is the main highway through the park. Other highways in the park include 120, 913, and 920.

In May and June of 2025, the 500,000-hectare (1,200,000-acre) Shoe Fire burned through the area closing the park, burning vast swathes of forest, and destroying several buildings. According to Paul Johnson, an assistant deputy minister with Saskatchewan's ministry of parks, culture and sport, "the fire burned so hot that the entire landscape was destroyed, so the impacts on the park environment, the ecosystem that makes the parks beautiful, are significant." The park will remain closed until 2026 to allow the landscape to have time to recover.

== Recreation ==
Narrow Hills offers a variety of recreational facilities and opportunities. These include sport fishing, hiking, and camping. The park contains 25 bodies of water suitable for fishing and another 30 within an hour's drive. In addition to the native walleye, yellow perch, whitefish, and northern pike, the park contains stocked trout species including brown, lake, brook, cutthroat, rainbow, and tiger. Some of the bodies of water that are stocked or otherwise accessible for fishing and recreation include McDougal Creek, Lost Echo Creek, Upper and Lower Fishing Lakes, the Gem Lakes, Summit Lake, Lost Echo Lake, Zeden Lake, Laycock Lake, Fairy Glen Lake, and Stickley Lake.

The southern tip of Little Bear Lake is in Narrow Hills Provincial Park and just north of the park boundary on the eastern shore of the lake is Little Bear Lake Recreation Site. Piprell Lake Recreation Site is immediately west of the park boundary at the northern end of Piprell Lake. Other nearby provincial parks include Clarence-Steepbank Lakes Provincial Park and Candle Lake Provincial Park.

=== Campgrounds ===
There are four campgrounds suitable for RV camping. These include Baldy Lake Campground, Ispuchaw Lake Campground, Zeden Lake Campground, and Lower Fishing Lake Campground. In addition to these, there are several tenting-only campgrounds throughout the park.

Wilderness campgrounds can be found at McDougal Creek, and the lakes of Lost Echo, Stickley, Jade, Diamond, and Opal.

=== Resorts and lodges ===
Located on the southern shore of Upper Fishing Lake is Caribou Creek Lodge, which offers a motel, cabins, a dining room, fuel, and a convenience store.

Pine Ridge Resort is located on Lower Fishing Lake and has beach access, a boat launch, cabins, RV camping, and a store.

== Gem Lakes ==
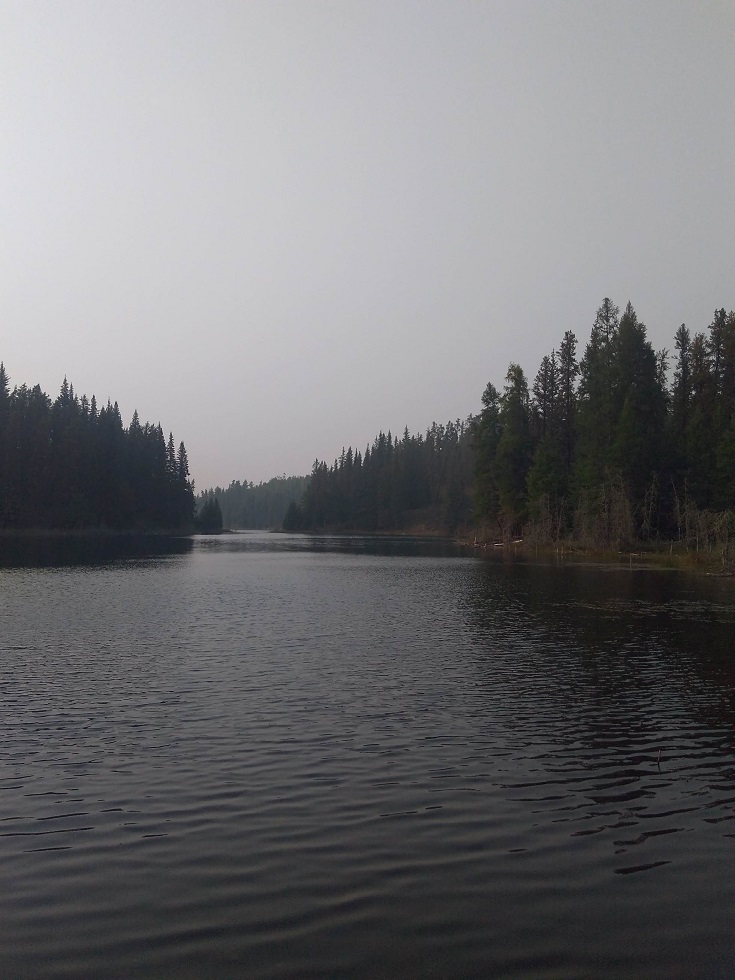
Little Jade Lake

The Gem Lakes are a cluster of seven deep, sand-bottom lakes at the north-west corner of Narrow Hills Provincial Park. The lakes are closed basin lakes that were formed more than 10,000 years ago during the last ice age. They are collectively called "Gem Lakes" because they reflect colours of emerald, jade, and aqua blue. The seven lakes include Pearl (54.1834°N 104.8009°W), Opal (54.1836°N 104.8018°W), Sapphire (54.1853°N 104.7985°W), Jade (54.1915°N 104.8112°W), Diamond (54.1895°N 104.8020°W), Little Jade (54.1893°N 104.8073°W), and Little Pearl (54.1851°N 104.8020°W).

A looping 5.5-kilometre (3.4 mi) long trail winds its way around all seven lakes with the trailhead and parking lot located at the north-west corner of Jade Lake. Along the trail, located at Jade, Diamond, and Opal Lakes, are eight wilderness campsites. The trail wanders along shorelines and up wooded ridges that provide lookouts and vantage points. There are several interpretive panels along the route and each lake is stocked with native fish species. Access to the lakes is from a secondary road off of Highway 913.

== Flora and fauna ==
The forests of the Narrow Hills Provincial Park are classified as Mid-Boreal Upland and trees found in the park include jack pine, aspen, birch, and spruce. There is a wide variety of animals that make the park home, including moose, white-tailed deer, elk, black bears, timber wolves, lynx, snowshoe hares, beaver, and muskrats. Bird species include the loon and red-tailed hawk.

== See also ==
- List of protected areas of Saskatchewan
- Tourism in Saskatchewan
- 2025 Canadian wildfires
