= Saskatchewan Highway 106 =

Provincial highway in Saskatchewan, Canada

Highway 106
- Hanson Lake Road
- Highway 106 highlighted in red

Route information
- Maintained by Ministry of Highways and Infrastructure
- Length: 325.1 km (202.0 mi)

Major junctions
- South end: Highway 55 near Smeaton
- Highway 120; Highway 165; Highway 135
- North end: Highway 167 in Creighton

Location
- Country: Canada
- Province: Saskatchewan

Highway system
- Provincial highways in Saskatchewan
| ← Highway 102 | → Highway 120 |

Highway 106, also known as Hanson Lake Road, is a fully paved provincial highway in Saskatchewan, Canada. It runs from Highway 55 at Smeaton to Highway 167 in Creighton. It is about 325 kilometres (202 mi) long and the speed limit is 100 km/h (62 mph).

Highway 106 connects with Highways 691, 692, 928, 120, 912, 913, 932, 933, 165, 911, and 135. Smeaton and Creighton are the only communities along the route.

== Parks and recreation ==
Many parks are directly accessible from Highway 106, including Narrow Hills Provincial Park, Big Sandy Lake Recreation Site, Granite Lake Recreation Site, Puskwakau River Recreation Site, Deschambault Lake (South East Arm) Recreation Site, Limestone Lake Recreation Site, and Hanson Lake Recreation Site.

== Major intersections ==
From south to north:

| Rural municipality | Location | km | mi | Destinations | Notes |
|---|---|---|---|---|---|
| Torch River No. 488 | Smeaton | 0.0 | 0.0 | Highway 55 – Nipawin, Prince Albert | Hwy 106 southern terminus |
| Torch River No. 488 | | 25.0 | 15.5 | Highway 691 south – Snowden | |
| Torch River No. 488 | | 26.0 | 16.2 | Highway 692 south – Choiceland | |
| Northern Administration District | | 52.8 | 32.8 | Highway 928 west (Harding Road) | Hwy 928 is unsigned |
| Northern Administration District | Narrow Hills Provincial Park | 67.7 | 42.1 | Highway 120 south – Candle Lake, Prince Albert; Highway 920 north – Lower Fishing Lake, Pine Ridge Resort | |
| Northern Administration District | Narrow Hills Provincial Park | 86.2 | 53.6 | Highway 913 south | |
| Northern Administration District | | 96.7 | 60.1 | Little Bear Lake Access Road – Little Bear Lake, Little Bear Lake Resort, Little Bear Lake Airport | |
| Northern Administration District | | 97.1 | 60.3 | Highway 932 east (Cub Lake Trail) | Hwy 932 is no longer provincially maintained |
| Northern Administration District | | 124.5 | 77.4 | Highway 920 south | Hwy 920 is closed due to several bridges being out |
| Northern Administration District | | 134.7 | 83.7 | Highway 165 west – La Ronge, Beauval | |
| Northern Administration District | | 215.9 | 134.2 | Highway 911 north – Deschambault Lake | |
| Northern Administration District | | 256.8 | 159.6 | Highway 135 north – Jan Lake, Pelican Narrows, Sandy Bay | |
| Northern Administration District | Creighton | 325.1 | 202.0 | Highway 167 to PTH 10 – Flin Flon, Denare Beach | Hwy 106 northern terminus |
1.000 mi = 1.609 km; 1.000 km = 0.621 mi: Closed/former

== See also ==
- Transportation in Saskatchewan
- Roads in Saskatchewan
