= Hudson Bay drainage basin =

Major drainage basin in Canada and the United States

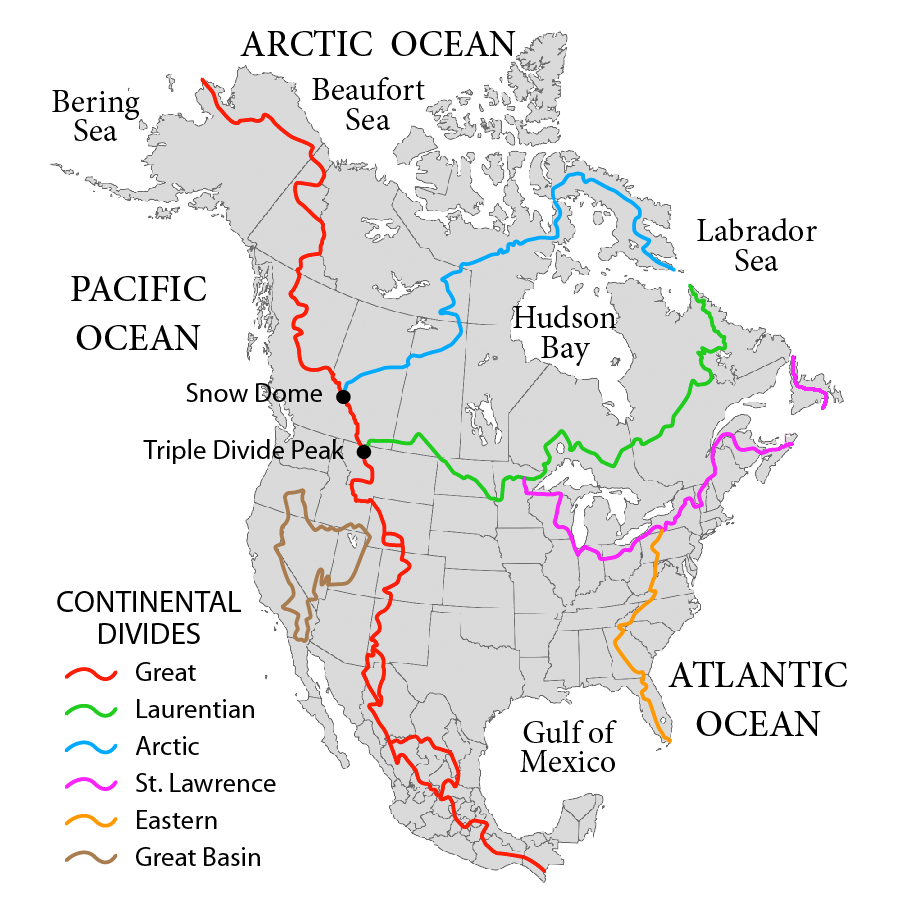
- The Hudson Bay drainage connects primarily to the Labrador Sea just south of Davis Strait, as depicted on most atlases such as those of the National Geographic Society, just north of the 60th parallel north and northeast of the Labrador Peninsula
- Area: 3,861,400 km^{2} (1,490,900 mi^{2})

Geology
- Type: Drainage basin

Geography
- Location: North America
- Country: Canada; United States
- Coordinates: 60°N 86°W
- Interactive map of Hudson Bay drainage basin

The Hudson Bay drainage basin is the drainage basin in northern North America where surface water empties into the Hudson Bay and adjoining waters. Spanning an area of about 3,861,400 square kilometres (1,490,900 sq mi) and with a mean discharge of about 30,900 m^{3}/s (1,090,000 cu ft/s), the basin is almost entirely within Canada. It encompasses parts of the Canadian Prairies, Central Canada, and Northern Canada. A small area of the basin is in the northern part of the Midwestern United States.

Rupert's Land, granted as a commercial monopoly to the Hudson's Bay Company in 1670

The Hudson Bay drainage basin coincides almost completely with the former territory of Rupert's Land, claimed by the Hudson's Bay Company in the 17th century. It was an ideal area for the early North American fur trade.

== Boundaries and limits ==
The Hudson Bay's connection to the Labrador Sea (the Atlantic Ocean) is at the Hudson Strait's mouth, between Resolution Island in the Qikiqtaaluk Region and Cape Chidley on the Labrador Peninsula. The watershed's headwaters to the south-west are on the Continental Divide of the Americas, bounded at Triple Divide Peak to the south, and Snow Dome to the north. The western and northern boundary of the watershed is the Arctic Divide, and the southern and eastern boundary is the Laurentian Divide.

The basin covers parts of the Canadian provinces and territories of Quebec, Ontario, Manitoba, Saskatchewan, and Alberta, Nunavut, and the Northwest Territories. U.S. states within the basin include Montana, South Dakota, North Dakota, and Minnesota.

Hudson Bay is often considered part of the Arctic Ocean. For example, the International Hydrographic Organization (in its current unapproved working edition only of Limits of Oceans and Seas) defines the Hudson Bay, with its outlet extending from 62.5 to 66.5 degrees north (just a few miles south of the Arctic Circle) as being part of the Arctic Ocean, specifically "Arctic Ocean Subdivision 9.11". Other authorities include it with the Atlantic Ocean, in part because of its greater water budget connection.

== Rivers ==
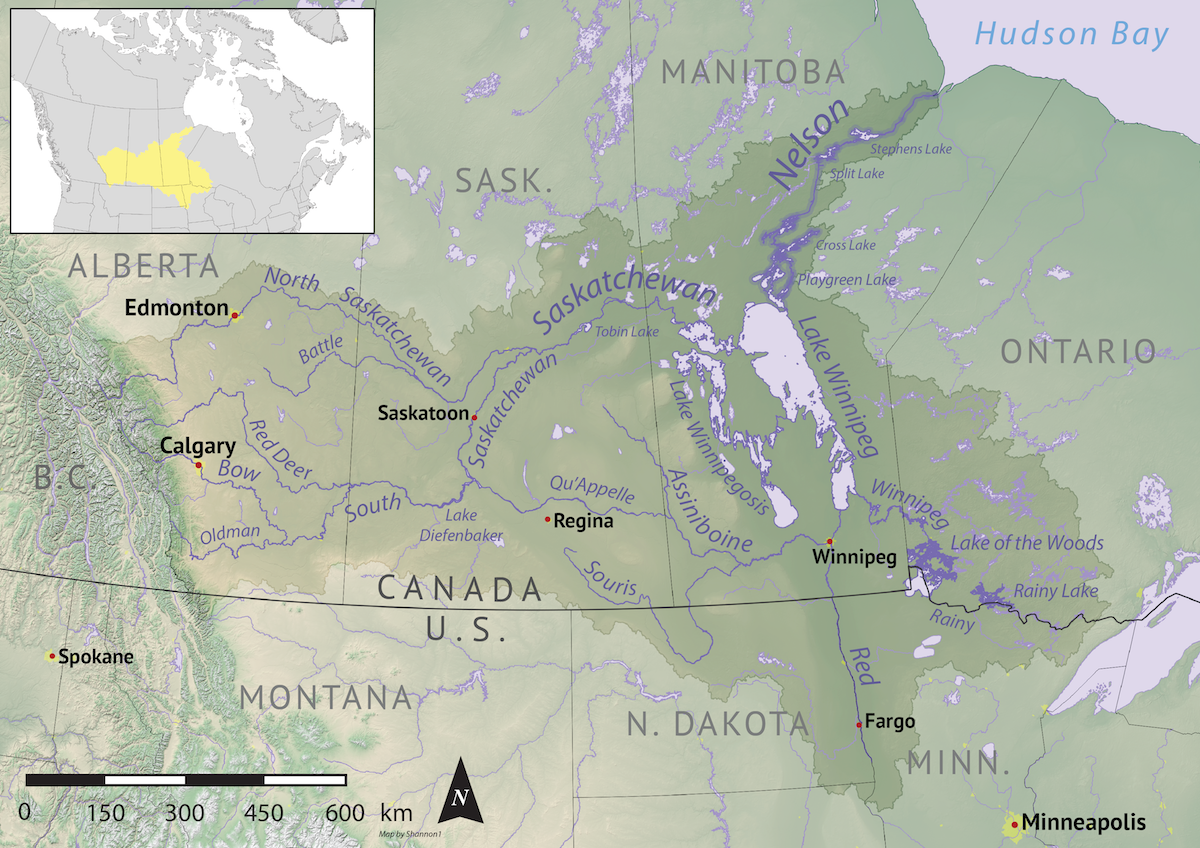
Nelson River drainage basin

The largest river system within the Hudson Bay drainage basin is the Nelson River. While the Nelson runs a relatively short 644 kilometres (400 mi) from Lake Winnipeg to the Hudson Bay, its tributaries extend as far west as the Rocky Mountains. From the Hudson Bay to Nelson River's farthest tributary, the Bow River, it has a length of 2,575 kilometres (1,600 mi) and a drainage basin of 1,072,300 square kilometres (414,000 sq mi). Some significant rivers include the Saskatchewan (550 km (340 mi)), North Saskatchewan (1,287 km (800 mi)), South Saskatchewan (1,392 km (865 mi)), Red (880 km (550 mi)), Assiniboine (1,070 km (660 mi)), and the Red Deer (740 km (460 mi)).

The following list of rivers includes the principal rivers draining into the Hudson, James, and Ungava Bays of the Hudson Bay drainage basin. The rivers are presented by coastline, clockwise, starting with the George River in north-eastern Quebec, just south of Cape Chidley and the entrance to the Atlantic Ocean.

Rivers of Quebec

- George
- Whale
- False
- Koksoak
- Leaf
- Arnaud
- Kovik
- Povungnituk
- Kogaluc
- Innuksuac
- Qikirtaluup Kuunga
- Nastapoka
- Little Whale
- Great Whale
- Roggan
- La Grande
- Eastmain
- Pontax
- Rupert
- Broadback
- Nottaway
- Harricana

Rivers of Ontario

- Moose
- Albany
- Lawashi
- Attawapiskat
- Ekwan
- Winisk
- Severn

Rivers of Manitoba

- Hayes
- Nelson
- Churchill
- South Knife
- North Knife
- Seal
- Caribou

Rivers of Nunavut

- Geillini
- Thlewiaza
- Tha-anne
- Ferguson
- Wilson
- Thelon
- Lorillard
- Brown
- Kirchoffer (Southampton Island)
- Koukdjuak (Baffin Island)

== See also ==
- Watersheds of North America
- List of rivers of Canada
- List of rivers of the United States
