= Saskatchewan River =

River in Western Canada

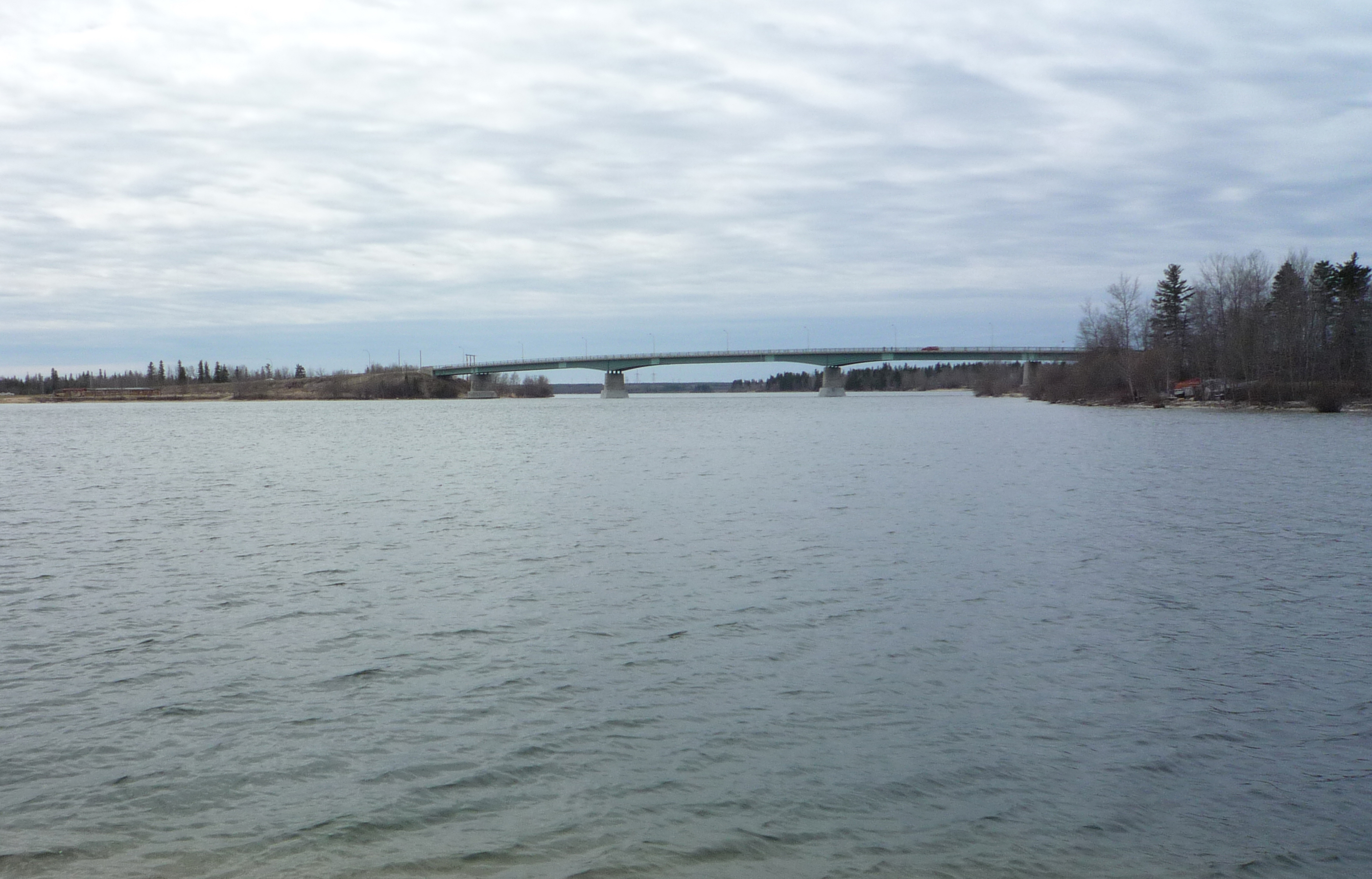
- Saskatchewan River's mouth at Lake Winnipeg

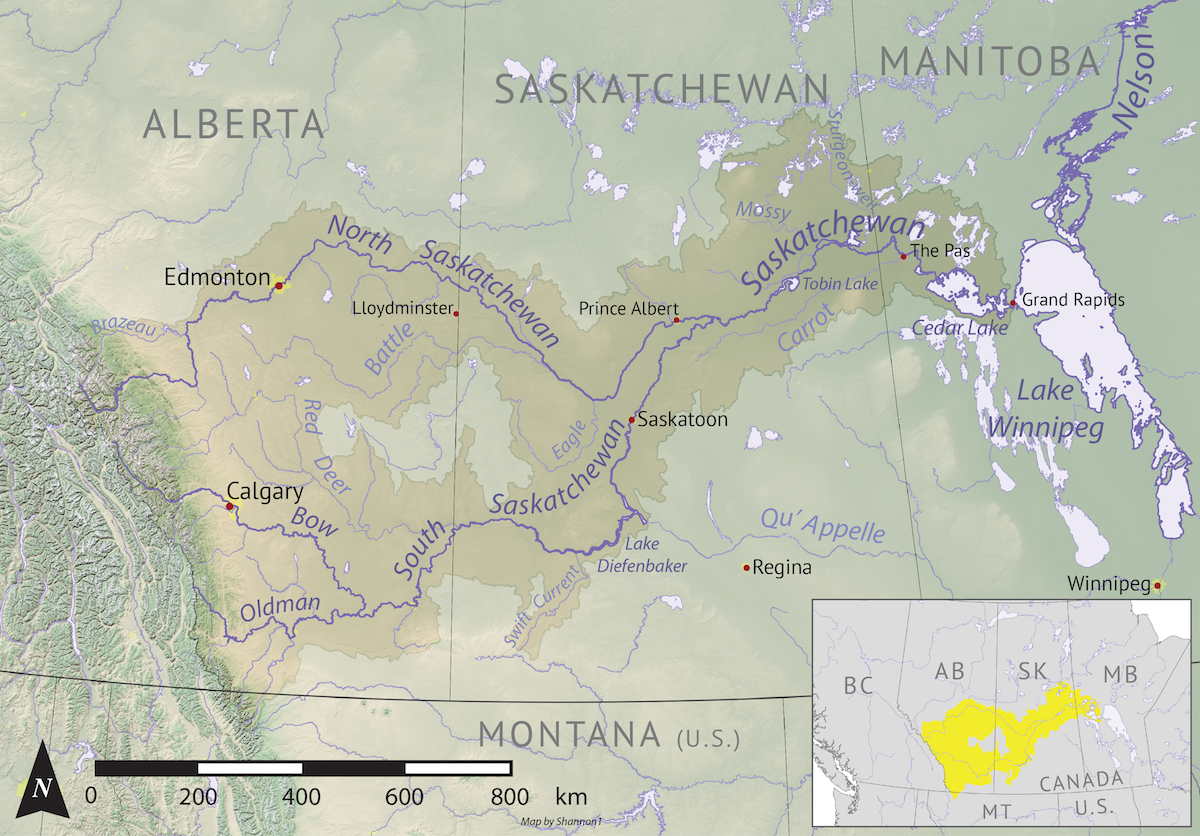
- Map of Saskatchewan River's watershed

Location
- Country: Canada
- Region: Manitoba; Saskatchewan

Physical characteristics
- 2nd source: Confluence of North and South Saskatchewan Rivers
  - location: 40 km (25 mi) east of Prince Albert, Saskatchewan
  - coordinates: 53°14′6″N 105°4′58″W
  - elevation: 380 m (1,250 ft)
- Mouth: Lake Winnipeg
  - location: Grand Rapids, Manitoba
  - coordinates: 53°11′6″N 99°15′22″W
  - elevation: 220 m (720 ft)
- Length: 547 km (340 mi)
- Basin size: 335,900 km^{2} (129,700 sq mi)
- Discharge
  - location: The Pas, Manitoba
  - average: 634 m^{3}/s (22,400 cu ft/s)
  - minimum: 54 m^{3}/s (1,900 cu ft/s)
  - maximum: 3,000 m^{3}/s (110,000 cu ft/s)

Basin features
- Progression: Lake Winnipeg → Nelson River → Hudson Bay
- River system: Nelson River

The Saskatchewan River (Cree: kisiskāciwani-sīpiy ᑭᓯᐢᑳᒋᐊᐧᓂ ᓰᐱᕀ, "swift flowing river") is a major river in Canada. It stretches about 550 kilometres (340 mi) from where it is formed by the joining of the North Saskatchewan River and South Saskatchewan River just east of Prince Albert, Saskatchewan. It flows roughly eastward across Saskatchewan and Manitoba to empty into Lake Winnipeg. Through its tributaries the North Saskatchewan and South Saskatchewan, its watershed encompasses much of the prairie regions of Canada, stretching westward to the Rocky Mountains in Alberta and north-western Montana in the United States.

Including its tributaries, it reaches 1,939 kilometres (1,205 mi) to its farthest headwaters on the Bow River, a tributary of the South Saskatchewan in Alberta.

== Description ==
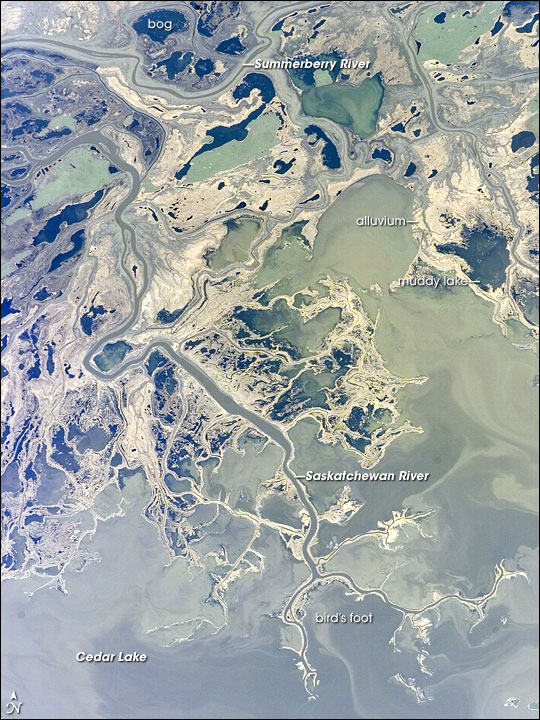
May 11, 2007 NASA photo of a portion of the Saskatchewan River Delta and Cedar Lake

It is formed in central Saskatchewan, approximately 40 kilometres (25 mi) east of Prince Albert, by the confluence of its two major branches, the North Saskatchewan and the South Saskatchewan, at the Saskatchewan River Forks. Both source rivers originate from glaciers in the Alberta Rockies. The St. Mary River, draining the Hudson Bay Divide region of Glacier National Park (U.S.), also empties into the Saskatchewan River via the south fork.

The combined stream flows east-northeast, into Codette Lake formed by the Francois Finlay Dam at Nipawin then into Tobin Lake, formed by the E.B. Campbell Dam. It then flows northeast, passing through a region of marshes, where it is joined from the northwest by the Torch River and the Mossy River. At the northern edge of the marshes it flows east, twisting between a series of small lakes into west-central Manitoba to The Pas, where it is joined from the southwest by the Carrot and Pasquia Rivers. Southeast of The Pas, it forms several streams in a delta on the northwest side of Cedar Lake, then exiting the lake on its southeast end and flowing approximately 5 km (3 mi) to Lake Winnipeg, entering on the northwest shore north of Long Point. The waters of Lake Winnipeg eventually drain into Hudson Bay, via the Nelson River.

The river, like the province of Saskatchewan, takes its name from the Cree word kisiskāciwani-sīpiy, meaning "swift flowing river". The river and its tributaries provided an important route of transportation for First Nations and early European trappers.

== Hydroelectric developments ==
=== Operating hydroelectric facilities ===
In Saskatchewan, SaskPower owns and operates E.B. Campbell (289 MW, formerly Squaw Rapids) and Nipawin (255 MW) Hydroelectric Stations.

In Manitoba, Manitoba Hydro owns and operates Grand Rapids Generating Station.

=== Proposed hydroelectric facilities ===
The Choiceland Generating Station would be located 51 km (32 mi) upstream of the Nipawin site. It would consist of four 150 MW generating units, providing 300 MW of baseload power, and an additional 300 MW of peaking power.

The Forks Generating Station would be located 18 km (11 mi) downstream of the North and South Saskatchewan River Forks, and would be approximately the same size as the Nipawin Station (255 MW of baseload power, and 420 MW of peak power). In 2019, James Smith Cree Nation began developing the project with AECOM and Tesla Energy.

== History ==
The river, labelled as the "Kish-stock-ewen" is identified on a Hudson's Bay Company map of 1760, produced from oral information from a First Nations man named Attickasish who had been Anthony Henday's guide. Another map from 1774 shows a fairly accurate course of the river.

The Saskatchewan River and its two major tributaries formed an important transportation route during the precontact, fur trade, and early settlement periods in the Canadian West. In early fur trading days the South Saskatchewan tributary was known as "La Fourche des Gros Ventres" ("Fork of the Great Gorges") and the North Saskatchewan was known as "Rivière du Pas".

First Nations inhabiting the area of the rivers included at one time or another the Atsina, Cree, Saulteaux, Blackfoot Confederacy, Assiniboine, and Sioux.

Henry Kelsey penetrated the area in the 1690s for the Hudson's Bay Company, and Louis de la Corne, Chevalier de la Corne, established the farthest western post of the French Empire in America (See New France) just east of the Saskatchewan River Forks at Fort de la Corne. In addition to this the Hudson's Bay Company and North West Company both ran numerous fur posts up the river and its two branches throughout the late 18th to late 19th centuries. York boats and canoes formed the primary means of travel during the fur trade period.

In the mid-19th century Métis settlements became important along stretches of the Saskatchewan River system, notably at the Southbranch Settlement, Prince Albert, Saskatchewan, and St. Albert, Alberta.

Riverboats were introduced from the Red River of the North in the 19th century and remained an important means of transportation until the 1890s and the coming of railways to the area.

The earliest settlements in Saskatchewan and Alberta generally were established around the rivers. Examples include Fort Edmonton (Edmonton, Alberta), Fort Battleford (Battleford, Saskatchewan), Prince Albert, Saskatchewan, and Cumberland House, Saskatchewan.

Fur trade on the lower river: The first European to ascend the river as far as the forks was Louis-Joseph Gaultier de La Vérendrye in spring 1739. The main posts on the river were (landmarks in parentheses): (Saskatchewan River Forks) Fort La Jonquière (?), Fort de la Corne, Cumberland House, Saskatchewan, (The Pas):second Fort Paskoya, (inflow to Cedar Lake:) first Fort Paskoya and second Fort Bourbon, (Cedar Lake), (inflow to Lake Winnipeg:) Grand Rapids, Manitoba, and first Fort Bourbon. There were also a number of temporary posts that have left few records. By far the most important post was Cumberland House which was the depot for the route northwest to the rich Athabasca country. To the west, the North Saskatchewan had the greatest number of posts. North Saskatchewan is the northern-most major river of the western prairies that flows into the Hudson Bay.

== In popular culture ==
The Saskatchewan River, and its two main tributaries, are featured in The Arrogant Worms' song "The Last Saskatchewan Pirate". While the lyrics imply that the Saskatchewan flows through Moose Jaw, Saskatoon and Regina, Saskatchewan, only Saskatoon, on the South Saskatchewan River, sees the waters of this river system; the closest point to both Moose Jaw and Regina are Lake Diefenbaker, a bifurcation lake on the South Saskatchewan, roughly 100 kilometres (62 mi) and 140 kilometres (87 mi) to their west-northwest, respectively.

== Fish species ==
Fish species include: walleye, sauger, yellow perch, northern pike, lake whitefish, mooneye, goldeye, white sucker, longnose sucker, shorthead redhorse, burbot, rainbow trout, brown trout, and lake sturgeon. In 2008 the presence of reproducing Prussian carp were found in the Red Deer River drainage basin which flows into the Saskatchewan River. Illegal introductions of non native species can have serious wide-ranging negative impacts on the ecosystem. While the exact species is not yet determined the genus is Carassius. The Blue Ribbon Bow River Trout fishery may be at risk as a result of this introduction. Illegal introductions of Carassius can be very harmful.

== See also ==
- List of longest rivers of Canada
- List of rivers of Manitoba
- List of rivers of Saskatchewan
- List of rivers of Alberta
- Dragline Channel
- Watershed management
- Saskatchewan River Delta
- Saskatchewan River fur trade
