= Hoare =

- Language: English and Irish

Origin
- Language: Middle English
- Origin: hor(e)
- Meaning: Grey, greyish, grey-white (usually referring to hair)
- Region of origin: British Isles

Other names
- Variant forms: Hore, Hoar, Dore

Hoare is an English surname derived from Middle English hor(e) meaning grey- or white-haired. Notable people with the surname include:

- Albert Alfred Hoare, known as Bert Hoare (1874–1962), South Australian politician
- Amy Hoare (born 1996), English chess player
- Bertie Hoare (1912–1947), World War II flying ace
- Des Hoare (born 1934), Australian cricketer
- Desmond Hoare (Royal Navy officer) (1910–1988), British sailor and educator
- Edward Hoare (disambiguation), several people
- Elizabeth Hoare (1915–2001), English church furnisher and actress
- Henry Hoare (banker) (1677–1725), English banker and land-owner
- Henry Hoare (1705–1785), English banker and garden owner-designer
- James Hoare (born 1943), British academic and historian
- Joe Hoare (1881–1947), English footballer
- John Gurney Hoare (1810–1875), English cricketer and banker
- Kelly Hoare (born 1963), Australian politician
- Louisa Gurney Hoare (1784–1836), English diarist and writer
- Mad Mike Hoare (1919–2020), Irish mercenary leader
- Marko Attila Hoare (born 1972), British historian
- Mary Hoare (1744–1820), English artist
- Mary Hoare, Lady Hoare (d. 1973), English Lady Mayoress of London and charity worker
- Peter Hoare (disambiguation), several people
- Prince Hoare (elder) (c.1711–1769), English sculptor
- Prince Hoare (younger) (1755–1834), English painter and dramatist
- Sir Richard Hoare (banker) (1648–1718), British goldsmith, banker and politician
- Sir Richard Hoare, 2nd Baronet (1758–1838), British antiquarian and archaeologist
- Sir Samuel Hoare, 1st Baronet (1841–1915), English politician
- Samuel Hoare, 1st Viscount Templewood (1880–1959), British politician
- Sarajane Hoare, British fashion journalist, stylist and magazine editor
- Seamus Hoare, Gaelic footballer
- Sean Hoare (1963–2011), British journalist
- Seán Hoare (born 1994), Irish professional footballer
- Simon Hoare (born 1969), British politician
- Sir Tony Hoare (1934–2026), British computer scientist
- Wilfred Hoare (1909–2003), English cricketer and headmaster
- William Hoare (c.1707–1792), British painter

== See also ==
- Hoare baronets, four Baronetcies
- Hoare logic, named after its inventor, Tony Hoare
