= Hore =

- Language: English

Origin
- Language: Middle English
- Origin: hor(e)
- Meaning: Grey, greyish, grey-white (usually referring to hair)
- Region of origin: British Isles

Other names
- Variant forms: Hoare, Hoar, Dore

Hore is an English surname, a variant of Hoare, and is derived from the Middle English hor(e) meaning grey- or white-haired. Notable people with the surname include:

- Andrew Hore (born 1978), New Zealand rugby player.
- Bradley Hore (born 1981), Australian flyweight boxer
- Charlie Hore (born 1976), New Zealand rugby player, brother of Andrew
- John Hore (disambiguation)
- María Gertrudis Hore (1742–1801), Spanish poet
- Peter Hore (prankster) (born 1960), Australian prankster
- Peter Hore (chemist), professor of chemistry at Oxford
- Richard Hore (floruit 1536), English sea captain and explorer of Canada
- Somnath Hore (1921–2006), Indian sculptor and printmaker
- Thomas Hore (died 1406), English Member of Parliament

== See also ==
- Patrick Hore-Ruthven (1913–1942), British soldier and poet
- Hore Abbey, a ruined monastery in Ireland
- Høre Stave Church, a Norwegian church
- Hor
