= Joseph Hoare =

Joseph Hoare may refer to:

- Joseph Hoare (Welsh academic) (1709–1802), Welsh clergyman and principal of Jesus College, Oxford
- Joseph Hoare (bishop of Victoria) (1858–1906), Anglican bishop
- Joseph Hoare (bishop of Ardagh and Clonmacnoise) (1842–1927), Roman Catholic bishop
- Joseph Hoare (MP for Kingston upon Hull) (1814–1886), British politician and banker
- Joe Hoare (1881–1947), English footballer
- Sir Joseph Hoare, 1st Baronet (1707–1801) of the Hoare Baronets, MP for Askeaton
- Sir Joseph Wallis Hoare, 3rd Baronet (1773–1852), of the Hoare baronets
- Sir Joseph Wallis O'Bryen Hoare, 5th Baronet (1828–1904), of the Hoare baronets

== See also ==
- Hoare
