= Hoar =

Hoar may refer to:

- Hoar (Forgotten Realms), a fictional Faerûnian deity in Dungeons & Dragons
- Hoar (surname)
- Hoar Construction, a heavy construction company headquartered in Birmingham, Alabama
- Hoar frost
  - Depth hoar, a large crystal occurring at the base of a snowpack

== See also ==
- Hoare
- Whore (disambiguation)
