= Hoar (surname) =

- Language: English

Origin
- Language: Middle English
- Origin: hor(e)
- Meaning: Grey, greyish, grey-white (usually referring to hair)
- Region of origin: British Isles

Other names
- Variant forms: Hoare, Hore, Dore

Hoar is an English surname, a variant of Hoare, and is derived from the Middle English hor(e) meaning grey- or white-haired. Notable people with the surname include:

- Ebenezer R. Hoar (1816–1895), influential American politician and lawyer
- George Frisbie Hoar (1826–1904), prominent United States politician
- Harold Frank Hoar (1909–1976), British architect and cartoonist (as 'Acanthus')
- Joseph P. Hoar (1934–2022), retired U.S. Marine Corps general
- Leonard Hoar (1630–1675), early American clergyman and educator
- Rockwood Hoar (1855–1906), member of the United States House of Representatives
- Roger Sherman Hoar (1887–1963), former state senator and assistant Attorney General of Massachusetts
- Samuel Hoar (1778–1856), United States lawyer and politician
- Sherman Hoar (1860–1898), American lawyer
- Syd Hoar (1895–1967), English footballer
- Thomas Bertie (1758–1825), Royal Navy officer born Thomas Hoar

== See also ==
- Hoar (disambiguation)
