= Wore =

Wore or WORE may refer to:

- Wore, Benin
- "Write once, run everywhere", a variant of the "Write once, run anywhere" slogan created by Sun Microsystems to illustrate the cross-platform benefits of the Java language

== See also ==
- Wear (disambiguation)
- Whore (disambiguation)
- Jasmin Wöhr, professional tennis player
- WOR (disambiguation)
