= Antonio Collalto (dramatist) =

Italian actor and writer

Antonio Collalto (1713 – 5 July 1778) was an Italian actor and writer, mainly of comedies in Commedia dell'arte style.

Collalto was born in Florence. As a young man, he was a soldier, but he afterwards became an actor, often playing the masked role of Pantalone. He also wrote many plays for his theater including il Pantalone avaro (The Jealous Pantalone); il Pantalone ringiovanito (The Rejuvenated Pantalone); la Famiglia in Discordia (The Family in Discord); il Pantalone padre severo (Pantalone the Strict Father); il Ritorno il'Argentina (The Return from Argentina); and finally Tre gemelli veneziani (Three Venetian Twins); in four acts from 1775. This latter comedy was very popular and was translated into French. Collalto would play the parts of all three twins. In English, the story was made into The Three and the Deuce (1795) by Prince Hoare. Collalto was applauded as a comedic actor for Italian plays in Paris.

== Sources ==
- Boni, Filippo de' (1852). Biografia degli artisti ovvero dizionario della vita e delle opere dei pittori, degli scultori, degli intagliatori, dei tipografi e dei musici di ogni nazione che fiorirono da'tempi più remoti sino á nostri giorni. Seconda Edizione.. Venice; Googlebooks: Presso Andrea Santini e Figlio. p. 236.
