= WOR =

WOR or wor may refer to:

- Wake-on-ring, in computer network terminology
- Water-to-oil ratio, in oil drilling
- WEPN-FM, a radio station (98.7 FM) licensed to New York, New York, United States, which used the call sign WOR-FM from 1948 to October 1972
- Wired OR, in Verilog semantics
- Wor, a traditional song and dance genre practiced on Biak, Indonesia
- WOR, the National Rail code for Worle railway station in North Somerset, UK
- WOR (AM), a radio station (710 AM) licensed to New York, New York, United States
- Worcestershire, county in England, Chapman code
- World Ocean Review, ocean and climate report from 2010
- Worthington Industries, stock ticker symbol
- WWOR-TV, a television station (channel 9) licensed to Secaucus, New Jersey, United States, which used the call sign WOR-TV from 1949 to April 1987

== See also ==
- Wore (disambiguation)
