= Bob Benson (footballer) =

English footballer (1883–1916)

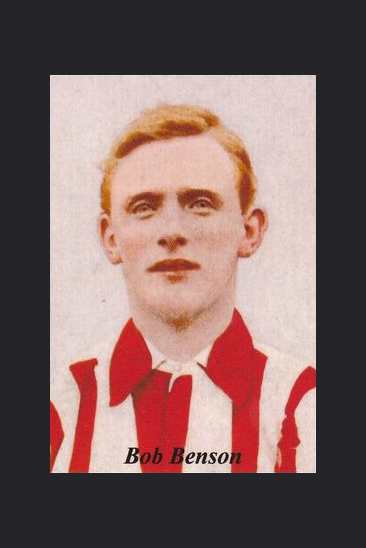

Personal information
- Full name: Robert William Benson
- Date of birth: 9 February 1883
- Place of birth: Whitehaven, Cumberland, England
- Date of death: 19 February 1916 (aged 33)
- Place of death: Highbury, London, England
- Height: 5 ft 9 in (1.75 m)
- Position: Full back

Youth career
- Dunston Villa
- Shankhouse
- Swalwell

Senior career*
Years	Team	Apps	(Gls)
1902–1904	Newcastle United	1	(0)
1904–1905	Southampton	19	(0)
1905–1913	Sheffield United	273	(20)
1913–1916	Woolwich Arsenal	52	(7)
Total		345	(27)

International career
1913	England	1	(0)
- * Club domestic league appearances and goals

Robert William Benson (9 February 1883 – 19 February 1916) was an English professional footballer, who played as a full back. Born in Whitehaven, Cumberland, he spent the majority of his professional career with Sheffield United but also had spells with Southampton and Woolwich Arsenal. He gained a solitary England cap in 1913 as well as representing The Football League and undertaking an FA tour of South Africa but died as a result of playing a football match in 1916.

== Club career ==
=== Newcastle United ===
Benson had worked as a coal-miner whilst playing for various local clubs in and around Whitehaven where he was born, including Swalwell, where he was spotted by Newcastle United and signed as a professional in December 1902. Competition for places restricted him to just a single appearance for the club, on 7 March 1903.

=== Southampton ===
Soon after the start of the 1904–05 season, the Southampton directors were trying to recruit a right-back following the departure of Tom Robertson in the summer. Joe Hoare had been tried but was now past his prime, so the directors sent a club official to the north east to hunt for a player. The official's quest took him to Newcastle, where he interviewed Benson and, after agreeing a fee of £150 with the Magpies, the official returned "triumphantly" to the south coast with his "catch".

Benson made his Southampton debut on 1 October 1904, in a 1–1 draw at home to Brighton & Hove Albion. Benson's form was immediately impressive; described as "big and bold", he was a terror to opposition forwards, "snuffing out their moves with his sense of anticipation". Benson also developed an unorthodox method of taking penalties – by running the full length of the pitch from his full-back position before kicking the ball. However, this method of penalty-taking was not a success, never actually converting any of the penalties he took in his year with the "Saints".

During his one season at The Dell, Benson missed several long periods through injury, when he was replaced by the veteran Samuel Meston, and made 19 Southern League appearances, plus three in the FA Cup, before a summer 1905 transfer took him back to the Football League First Division for a fee of £150, when he joined Sheffield United.

=== Sheffield United ===
Benson had arrived at Bramall Lane relatively cheaply, with Southampton mistakenly believing that Newcastle had retained his registration and thus were due an additional fee from the Blades. He spent eight seasons at Bramall Lane, cementing himself in the defence where he developed into a strong tackler and was commanding in the air. He became the team's regular penalty taker, perfecting a routine whereby he would jog slowly up from his normal defensive position before breaking into a run and shooting after a teammate had placed the ball on the spot – all but one of his 21 goals scored for United came from the penalty spot.

Benson took over the captaincy from Bernard Wilkinson but soon relinquished it to Jack English when he lost his place in the first team through injury, following which he requested a transfer. During his time with Sheffield United, the club generally finished in mid-table, with their highest finish being fourth in 1906–07. He played 283 matches for Sheffield United in all competitions, scoring 21 goals, including 20 penalties.

=== Woolwich Arsenal ===
In April 1913 Benson joined Woolwich Arsenal, soon after they had made their move to Highbury. He made his debut against Bristol City on 29 November 1913, and over two seasons he made 53 appearances for the Gunners, mostly at full-back although he was later moved to centre forward, and eventually scored seven goals for the club as they tried for promotion back into the First Division; Arsenal would eventually return to the First Division after being elected to the expanded top flight following the end of World War I, based on their position of fifth in 1914–15.

Due to the war, in 1915 first-class football was suspended. Benson quit the game to work at the Royal Arsenal, Woolwich, munitions factory. He kept in touch with his old club and on 19 February 1916 attended a London Combination match at Highbury against Reading. With his former teammate Joe Shaw unable to make the game, Benson volunteered to take his place, which ultimately had fatal consequences. Having not played a game for nearly a year, Benson was not match-fit. He collapsed on the pitch in the second half and had to be taken off; soon afterwards he died in the Highbury changing rooms, in the arms of team trainer George Hardy.

It was later determined he had died of a burst blood vessel, from a long-standing medical condition. Benson was buried wearing his Arsenal shirt. Three months later, Arsenal held a testimonial match in his honour, against a Rest of London XI, with the proceeds going to his widow; over 5,000 attended to pay their respects.

== International career ==
His form at Sheffield United brought him to the notice of the Football Association and in 1910 he was a member of the FA touring party to South Africa, as well as representing the Football League on one occasion. He received his solitary cap for England on 15 February 1913 when he played at left-back against Ireland, when England lost 2–1, with both Irish goals coming from Benson's Sheffield United teammate Billy Gillespie.
