= Dore =

Dore or Doré may refer to:

== Geography ==
=== Places ===
- Dore, South Yorkshire, England
  - Dore and Totley, electoral ward that includes this village
- Abbey Dore, village in Herefordshire, England
- Dore, in the district of Gweedore, Ireland
- Dore Lake, Saskatchewan, a hamlet in Canada
- La Doré, Quebec, a municipality of Quebec, Canada
- Dore-l'Église, France
- Mont-Dore, France
- Le Mont-Dore (New Caledonia)

=== Rivers ===
- River Dore, a tributary of River Monnow in Herefordshire, England
- Dore (river), a tributary of the Allier in Puy-de-Dôme, France
- Dore, one of two sources of the Dordogne in Puy-de-Dôme, France
- Doré River, a tributary of the Fraser River in British Columbia, Canada
- Doré River, an outflow of Doré Lake in Saskatchewan, Canada

=== Lakes ===
- Lake Doré, Ontario, Canada
- Doré Lake, Saskatchewan, Canada

=== Islands ===
- Dore Holm, Shetland Islands

== People ==
=== Surname Dore ===
- Charlie Dore (born 1956), English songwriter
- Chris Dore, Australian journalist
- David Dore (1940–2016), Canadian ice skating official
- Elizabeth Dore, British historian of Latin America
- Jimmy Dore (born 1965), American comedian
- John Dore (basketball), Canadian basketball coach
- John Clark Dore (1822–1900), American educator and politician
- Jon Dore (born 1976), Canadian comedian and actor
- Julie Dore (born 1960), British politician
- Richard Dore (1749–1800), English lawyer and judge
- Ronald P. Dore (1925–2018), British sociologist
- Tim Dore (born 1973), American politician
- Tom Dore (born 1958), American sports announcer
- Valerie Dore (born 1963), Italian singer

=== Surname Doré ===
- Alexander Doré (1923–2002), British actor
- André Doré (born 1958), former professional ice hockey player
- Armand Doré (1824–1882), French painter
- Daniel Doré (born 1970), former professional ice hockey right winger
- Edna Doré (1921–2014), British actress
- Gustave Doré (1832–1883), a French artist, engraver, illustrator and sculptor
- Jean Doré (1944–2015), Canadian politician
- Julien Doré (born 1982), French singer
- Marie-Joseph-Camille Doré (1831–1888), captain in the French navy
- Pierre Doré or Auratus (c. 1500–1559), French Dominican theologian

=== First name ===
- Dore Gold (born 1953), Israeli diplomat
- Dore Schary (1905–1980), American writer and director

== Other uses ==
- Dore (film) or The Ruler, a 1995 Indian Kannada language feature film directed by Shivamani
- Dore Abbey, monastery in Herefordshire, England
- Doré bar or dore bar, also known as doré bullion, a low-purity bar of gold produced at a mine site
- Dore Programme, brain training program for learning, attention, and social difficulties
- Doré Records, an American record label
- Doré v Barreau du Québec, a Supreme Court of Canada case
- Castle Dore, hillfort in Cornwall, England

== See also ==
- Door
- La Dorée, a commune in the Mayenne department in northwestern France
