= Portrait of Henry Pelham =

Painting by William Hoare

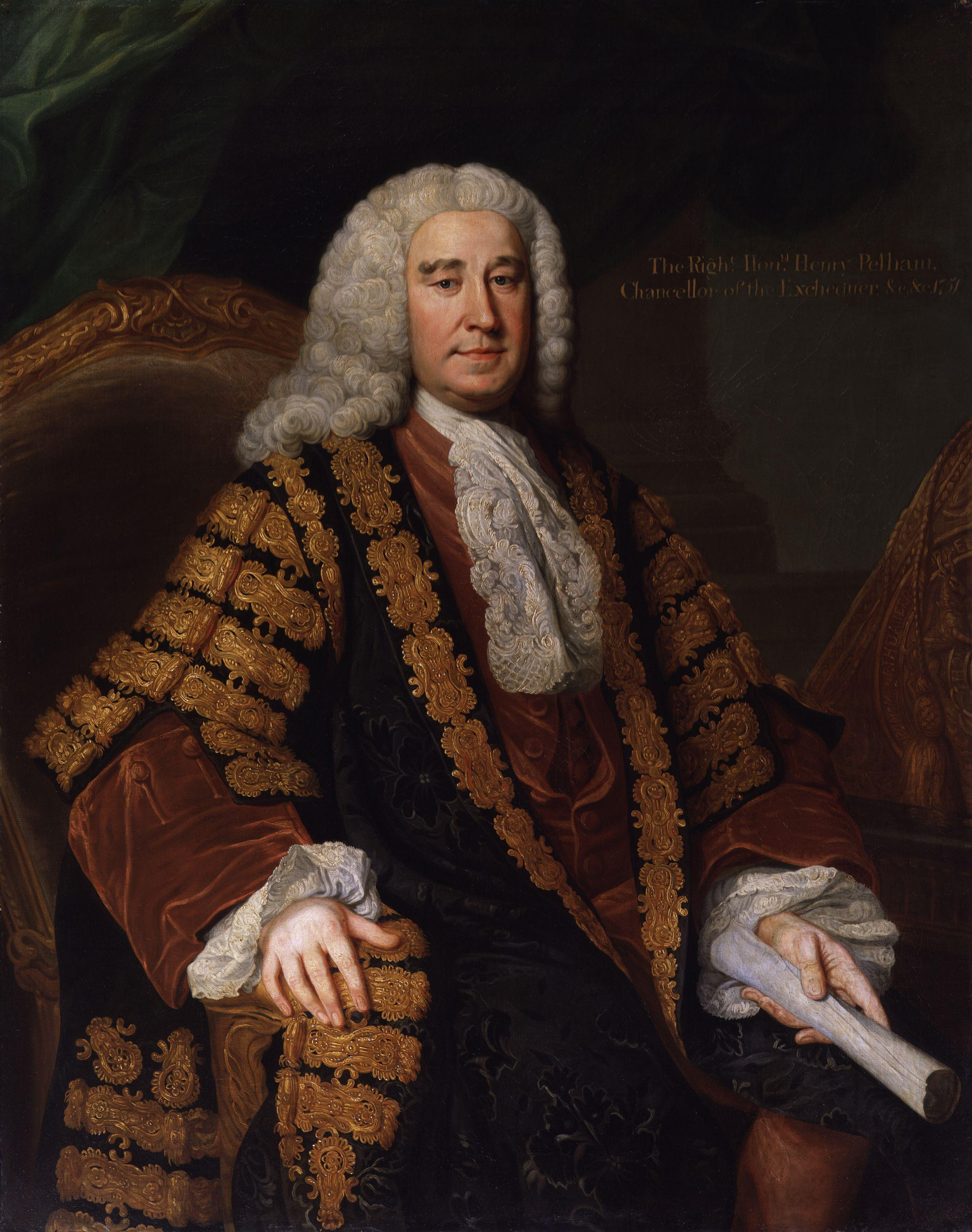
- Artist: William Hoare
- Year: 1751
- Type: Oil on canvas, portrait painting
- Dimensions: 127 cm × 101.6 cm (50 in × 40.0 in)
- Location: National Portrait Gallery; London

Portrait of Henry Pelham is a 1751 portrait painting by the British artist William Hoare. It depicts the English Whig politician Henry Pelham who was Prime Minister from 1743 to his death in 1754. He is shown at three-quarters length wearing the robes of the Chancellor of the Exchequer.

Hoare was a noted portraitist based in Bath, but this picture was produced during a short-lived move to work in the capital. Back in Bath he and Thomas Gainsborough became rivals, producing portraits for the fashionable elite. Today the painting is in the collection of the National Portrait Gallery in London, having been acquired in 1866. A mezzotint based on the painting was produced in 1752 by the Irish engraver Richard Houston.

== Bibliography ==
- Allen, Brian. The British Portrait, 1660-1960. Antique Collectors' Club, 1991.
- Kerslake, John. Early Georgian Portraits. National Portrait Gallery, 1977
- Sutherland, Lucy. Politics and Finance in the Eighteenth Century. Bloomsbury Publishing, 1984.
