= The Three and the Deuce =

1795 play by Prince Hoare

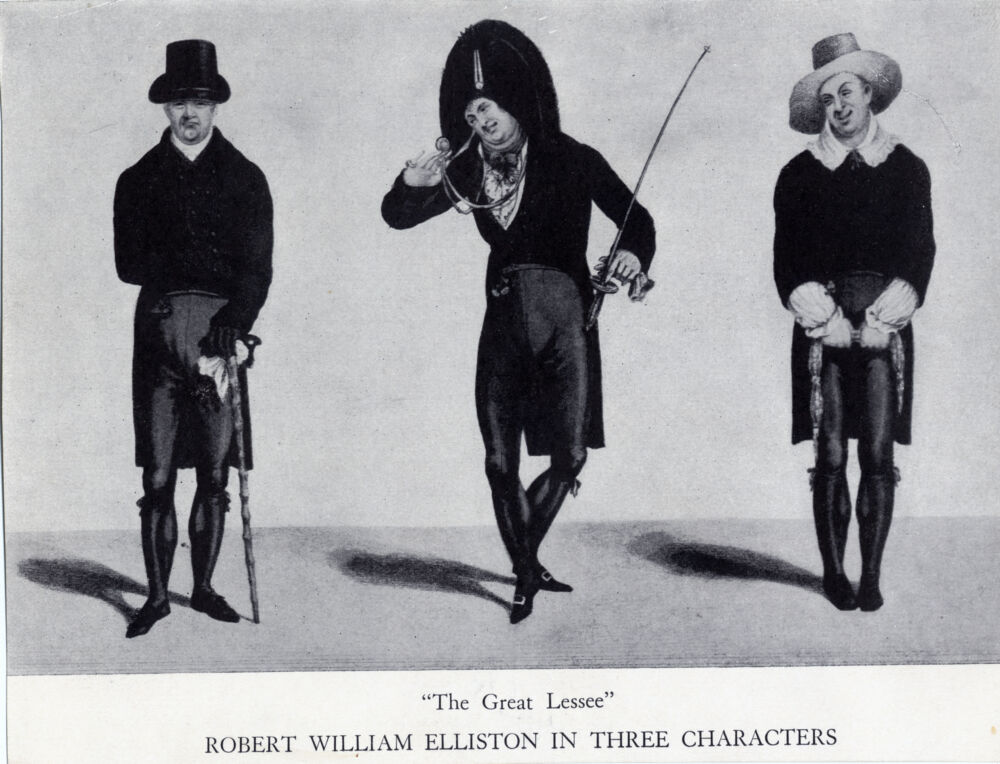
- Robert William Elliston as the three Singles
- Original language: English
- Written by: Prince Hoare
- Setting: Cheltenham

Premiere
- Date: 2 September 1795
- Place: Theatre Royal Haymarket

The Three and the Deuce is a 1795 English afterpiece with libretto by Prince Hoare and music by Stephen Storace.

It was first performed at the Theatre Royal Haymarket on 2 September 1795. It was later revived at Drury Lane, and "with great success" by Robert William Elliston. The piece was first printed in 1806. Some sources suggest it was originally not very popular but grew into a very favorably received piece.

The piece was known for having one actor play three different roles, the three "Singles". One song in the piece. "Little Taffline", is referenced in the Dickens' novel David Copperfield.

The Memoirs of John Bannister published in 1839, provide this summary of the play:

Toward the close of the season, (2nd September,) "The Three and the Deuce," a new comedy by Prince Hoare, called forth Bannister's versatile powers. The author has placed in the same inn at Cheltenham three brothers, Pertinax, Peregrine, and Percival Single, not less alike than the Menaechmi of Plautus, or the Antipholises of Shakspeare, but very different in their propensities. Pertinax is studious, grave, sententious; Peregrine volatile, active, enterprising; while poor Percival, a mere idiot, is only permitted to leave home under the protection of an Irish tutor (God save the mark!) named Mac Floggum. Bannister played the three brothers, and preserved, with admirable fidelity, their separate identity. The mistakes and confusion which arise from each being seen separately, and mistaken for one of the others, form an amusing, and sometimes interesting entanglement. Grizzle, a servant of Pertinax, is driven almost beyond his senses at the unexpected sallies of his master; and, at last, Percival is rescued from the stern dominion of Mac Floggum, to undergo a more gentle captivity with Taffline, an interesting little Welsh girl, admirably played by Mrs. Bland. The piece was very favourably received; and Bannister, and, after him, Elliston, acquired great applause in the three Singles.

The story was said in contemporary British sources to directly derive from the Spanish comedy Los Tres Mellizos popular in Madrid, though remodeled and made English by Hoare. Italian playwright Antonio Collalto wrote Tre gemelli veneziani (Three Venetian Twins) in 1773, which was inspired by The Venetian Twins (1747) by Carlo Goldoni, but to which the twins were made into triplets., The Collalto play was translated into French by P.-A. Lefèvre de Marcouville as Les Trois Jumeaux Vénitiens, and the Spanish translation upon which Hoare is said to have relied was Los Tres Mellizos.

== Original 1795 Haymarket cast ==
- Mr. Milford by Mr. Benson
- Justice Touchit by Mr. Suett
- Pertinax Single / Peregrine Single / Percival Single by John Bannister
- Mac Floggan by Mr. Johnstone
- Humphrey Grizzle by Mr. Fawcett
- Frank by Mr. Wathen
- Renard by Mr. Caulfied
- Freeman by Mr. Bannister
- Pinch by Mr. Cross
- Tippy by Mr. Ledger
- Cramp by Mr. Abbot
- Gregory by Mr. Evans
- Emily by Mrs. Gibbs
- Phoebe by Miss Leak
- Taffline by Mrs. Bland
