= World Ocean Review =

Report on the state of the world's oceans

- Discipline: Marine science
- Language: English, German
- Edited by: Nikolaus Gelpke

Publication details
- History: 2010–present
- Publisher: maribus (Germany)
- Open access: Yes
- ISO 4: Find out here

Links
- Journal homepage

The World Ocean Review is series of reports dealing with the state of the world ocean and the interactions between the ocean and ecological, economical and sociopolitical conditions. There is a print and a free-to-download version on the official website of the project. Launched in 2010, it is published by the non-profit organization Maribus, founded by publisher mareverlag in Hamburg, Germany. Print and online versions are available.

== Content ==
The content of the World Ocean Review reflects the current state of scientific knowledge; this is achieved through intensive cooperation with the Kiel-based Cluster of Excellence “The Future Ocean”, the International Ocean Institute in Malta and the publisher, mareverlag. The German Marine Research Consortium (KDM) has been involved as a partner since the fifth edition. The topics covered in the World Ocean Review are closely aligned to the partner institutes’ own areas of research. Each topic is presented in clear and accessible language and visuals. The reports cover a range of specialist topics, from an introduction to the Earth’s climate system to fossil fuels from the ocean and the international law of the sea. The overarching theme of the work as a whole is: “Living with the oceans”. The sound scientific information provided in the report is intended to be useful for anyone wishing to make an active and factual contribution to the current debate around marine research.

== Editions ==
The first edition of the World Ocean Review explored general topics relating to the ocean. Volumes 2 to 6 focus on more specialised issues of relevance to the marine environment. WOR 7 is, once again, a wide-ranging report which covers all the key thematic areas, whereas the eighth volume discusses the specific question of how the ocean should absorb (even) more carbon dioxide. WOR 9 deals with marine biodiversity.

=== World Ocean Review 9: Marine biodiversity – Vital Essence of Our Oceans (2026) ===
Wor 9 deals with the question what species live in the sea, and what environmental factors determine their distribution or the size of their habitat? Why is the ocean's biodiversity declining, and how can it be successfully protected?

=== World Ocean Review 8: The Ocean – A Climate Champion? How to Boost Marine Carbon Dioxise Uptake (2024) ===
WOR 8 explains the carbon cycle in an understandable way and discusses in detail the various ways in which the sea can be enabled to absorb more carbon dioxide from the atmosphere. Near-natural alternatives such as reforestation with seagrass meadows, mangrove forests and salt marshes play a role here. But also approaches such as artificial upwelling, alkalinization and the injection of carbon dioxide into the seabed are being discussed. All methods are analyzed not only in terms of their scientific feasibility, but also with regard to their ethical, social, legal and economic consequences.

=== World Ocean Review 7: The Ocean, Guarantor of Life – Sustainable Use, Effective Protection (2021) ===
WOR 7's chapters include:

1. Our oceans – source of life: This chapter offers an introduction to the importance of the seas for humankind and describes the ecosystem services provided by the oceans.
2. Oceans under climate change: Drawing on the latest scientific knowledge, this chapter explains the relationships between CO_{2} uptake by the ocean, climate change and the associated risks to the ocean ecosystem. Oxygen depletion, ocean acidification, sea-level rise and the loss of marine biodiversity as a consequence of climate warming are also explained.
3. Food from the sea: This chapter describes the importance of fish as a staple food, the significance of fishing and the major problems associated with overfishing. It also discusses the costs and benefits of aquaculture and looks at fisheries management methods.
4. Transport over the seas: This chapter mainly covers economic aspects of the world’s maritime traffic, but also looks at the increasing responsibility of maritime shipping in the context of climate change.
5. Energy and resources from the ocean: Fossil fuels, marine mineral resources, methane hydrate and offshore generation of renewable energies offer great potential for humankind, but they also pose risks, not only to the climate and the environment. All this is discussed in this chapter.
6. Pollution of the oceans: Harmful substances in the sea not only endanger marine flora and fauna; they accumulate in the food chain and thus affect people as well. Most of these pollutants, such as plastic litter, originate from sources on land. The action that is being taken or is needed in future is discussed here.
7. The race for the oceans’ genetic diversity: Today, not only can new active pharmaceutical substances be extracted from marine organisms (e.g. for cancer treatment); these organisms are also of interest for research into the causes of disease. This chapter describes the decoding of new substances, the research into some very old diseases and the legal status of marine biomedical research.
8. Marine management – aspiration and reality: This chapter covers the legal system and governance of the ocean. It shows how problem-solving is possible if new cross-sectoral, transboundary approaches to marine management are applied.

=== World Ocean Review 6: The Arctic and Antarctic – Extreme, Climatically Crucial and In Crisis (2019) ===
The sixth World Ocean Review focuses on the Arctic and the Antarctic. It describes the history and exploration of the polar regions, their key role for the global climate and the changes that can be observed in their flora and fauna. It also analyses the sometimes dramatic impacts of global warming on these extremely fragile regions.

=== World Ocean Review 5: Coasts – A Vital Habitat Under Pressure (2017) ===
The fifth World Ocean Review explores the coasts and the diverse expectations placed upon this habitat.

=== World Ocean Review 4: Sustainable Use of Our Oceans – Making Ideas Work (2015) ===
The fourth World Ocean Review focuses on sustainability in relation to the marine environment. It explores the definition of sustainability and offers practical strategies for sustainable ocean development.

=== World Ocean Review 3: Marine Resources – Opportunities and Risks (2014) ===
WOR 3 investigates the use of the world’s oceans as a supplier of natural resources. The chapters looks back upon more than 100 years of offshore oil and natural gas production and discuss the new topic of marine mining of metals (manganese nodules), the potential for future extraction of methane hydrate and the associated problems and risks.

=== World Ocean Review 2: The Future of Fish – The Fisheries of the Future (2013) ===
The importance of marine fish and fishing in feeding the world population is discussed in five chapters. Various questions are explored, such as: How do marine ecosystems work? How important is fish in the human diet? And what risks are posed by the ever-increasing global consumption of fish?

=== World Ocean Review 1: Living with the Oceans (2010) ===
The first edition of the World Ocean Review provides an overview of all topics of relevance to the marine environment.

== Reception ==
Many national and international researchers have summarised numerous studies from the fields of climate and marine research in the reports. According to Die Zeit, the third issue was the first comprehensive assessment of the estimated quantity of oil and gas reserves below the sea floor.
