= Mary Hoare =

English painter

Mary Hoare (1744–1820) was an English painter. She was William Hoare's daughter and Prince Hoare's sister. The latter had a strong influence on her.

== Life and career ==
There is little known about Mary Hoare's life. In 1765 she married Henry Hoare (1744–1785). Between 1761 and 1764 she displayed works at the Society of Artists of Great Britain and at the Free Society of Artists.

== Works by Hoare ==
Most of her known works deal with scenes of Shakespearean plays and can be located at the Yale Center of British Art.
