= María Gertrudis Hore =

Spanish poet

María Gertrudis Hore (1742–1801) was a Spanish poet.

== Life and career ==
She began as a socialite of Irish immigrant parents. In 1762 she married and then sixteen years after that she became a nun. In the convent she wrote poetry and became known as the "Daughter of the Sun" for her renown. Friendship among women is a theme in some of her works. She has also been described as self-referential and, despite being a nun, occasionally erotic in poetry. Additionally she has been of interest as a woman who produced Spanish Enlightenment literature, although some of her work is more similar to Romanticism.

== Notable work ==
A poet in search of freedom and Maria Gertrudis Hore Law (1742-1801)
