= Peter Hoare =

Peter Hoare or Hore may refer to:

- Peter Hore (prankster), Australian prankster
- Peter Hoare (tenor) (born 1961), British singer
- Peter Hore (historian) (born 1944), British historian
- Peter Hore (chemist), British chemist and academic
- Peter Merrick Hoare (1843–1894), English politician
- Two of the Hoare baronets:
  - Sir Peter William Hoare, 7th Baronet (1898–1973)
  - Sir Peter Richard David Hoare, 8th Baronet (1932–2004)
