= Elizabeth Hoare =

English actress (1915–2001)

- Born: Elizabeth Louise Hoare; 17 November 1915; Marylebone, London, England
- Died: 13 October 2001 (aged 85); London, England
- Occupations: Actress; Church furnisher
- Years active: 1931–1990s
- Spouse: Graham Hoare
- Children: 2

Elizabeth Louise Hoare (née Scott: 17 November 1915 – 13 October 2001) was an English church furnisher and actress who was the owner of Watts & Co., producer of domestic furniture, ecclesiastical vestments, textiles and wallpaper. She was on a Royal Academy of Dramatic Art (RADA) scholarship, working in rep and then in cinema. Hoare turned down an invitation to join the Hollywood scene and acted with the BBC Drama Repertory Company during the Second World War. She and her husband took over the running of Watts & Co. in the post-war years and her collection is stored as the Liverpool Cathedral Embroidery Museum in her uncle's triforium gallery in the Gothic building in Liverpool Cathedral.

== Early life and education ==
On 17 November 1915, Elizabeth Louse Hoare was born in Marylebone, London. Her mother was Australian-born Alice O'Hara, who was brought to England by her wealthy father seeking for his two daughters to marry. Hoare's father, Sebastian Gilbert Scott, was a doctor and radiologist and the son of Watts & Co. co-founder George Gilbert Scott Jr. She was the niece of the Liverpool Cathedral designer Giles Gilbert Scott. Hoare went to schools in London, and the Upper Chine School on the Isle of Wight.

== Career ==
In 1931, she was sent to Paris to be "finished" and spent one year in Germany. Hoare was impressed with Nazi rallies but did not take in their political views. In 1934, she earned a Royal Academy of Dramatic Art (RADA) scholarship and worked in rep before doing cinema work. Hoare was offered various roles in film by RADA and was cast by Alexander Korda in the 1936 film Rembrandt. She also had a role in the film noir Fingers. Hoare was invited to join the Hollywood scene, having secured a contract with Warner Bros., but decided against it because her husband did not want to go to the United States and she felt her likeness to Vivien Leigh would disadvantage her. She continued acting with the BBC Drama Repertory Company during the Second World War and became a lifelong friend of Val Gielgud.

Following the conclusion of the war, Hoare and her husband took over the management of Watts & Co., and moved the business from Baker Street to Dacre Street, Westminster in 1950 following the expiration of its previous lease. She received commissions from the City of London, and became more experimental in their designs under Keith Murray's guidance. Hoare disliked George Pace's modernist style and according to The Daily Telegraph "relished the impermanence that resulted from the eccentric materials he insisted upon using." She was commissioned by the architect and designer Stephen Dykes Bower for the refurbishment of the coronation altar frontal in Westminster Abbey in 1953. During the 1960s and the 1970s, Hoare swiftly employed people working for firms such as Louis Grosse and Norman Hartnell, having been encouraged by a new generation of artistic and liturgical trends.

After a failed attempt by her husband to buy out the firm in 1965, she was able to keep the business running, moving it to Faith House in Tufton Street, Westminster. Hoare had the Winifrid Peppiatt embroideress and the Baker Street employees as well as skilled needlewomen from collapsed firms working for her by the late 1970s. She also acquired the stock of the collapsed firms. Hoare was persuaded to continue in the business by Dykes Bower's ongoing patronage and the reducing number of traditional architects in addition to the support of young architectural historians. By the 1990s, her style of the long considered unfashionable Victorian embroidery was coming into vogue; Hoare had collected embroidery from churches and convents while visiting clients. Hoare had changed the dyes and weaves of some of her textiles and appointed a new manager, who took her business into the American market.

== Personal life ==
She was a Roman Catholic before converting to Anglicism later in life. Hoare was described by Gavin Stamp of The Independent as appearing with a "powdered white face, pencilled-on eyebrows under a her high forehead and bright red lip." The Times calls her "a woman of great style and presence who charmed (and perhaps rather intimidated) generations of deans, canons and incumbents" and noted her humour and kindness. She married the British Army Lieutenant-Colonel Graham Hoare in September 1939. They had two children. On 13 October 2001, she died in London.

== Legacy ==
The Times noted that Hoare was "largely responsible for the modern movement for the preservation and study of Victorian ecclesiastical needlework and embroidery". In 1992, she agreed with the priest Ken Riley to open a space for her collection to be stored in her uncle's triforium gallery in the Gothic building of Liverpool Cathedral. It was called the Elizabeth Hoare Gallery but is now known as the Liverpool Cathedral Embroidery Museum.
