= William Hoare =

English painter (1707–1792)

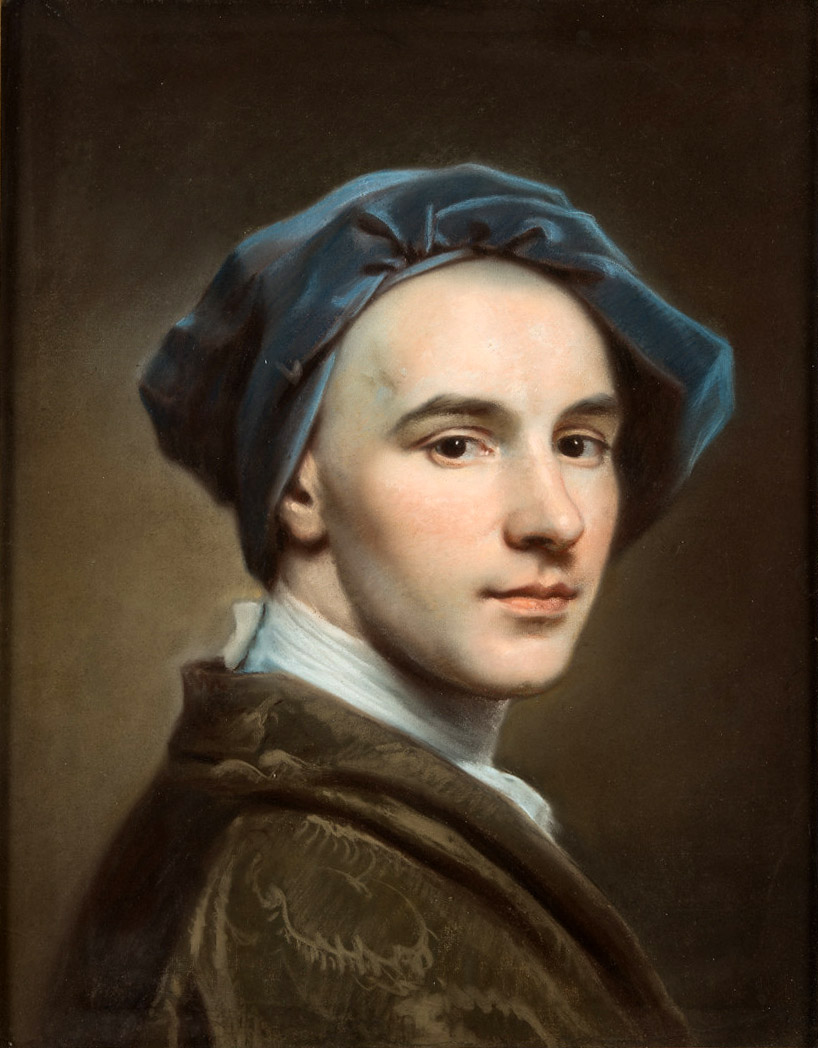
William Hoare – Self-portrait

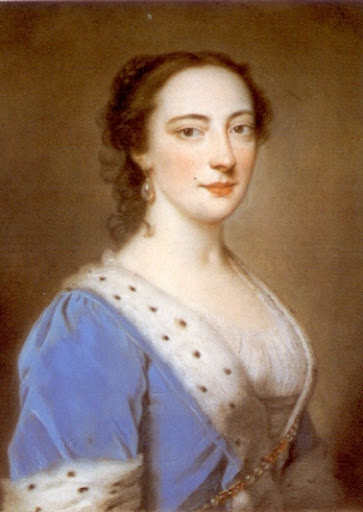
Portrait of Mary Howard, Duchess of Norfolk, by William Hoare

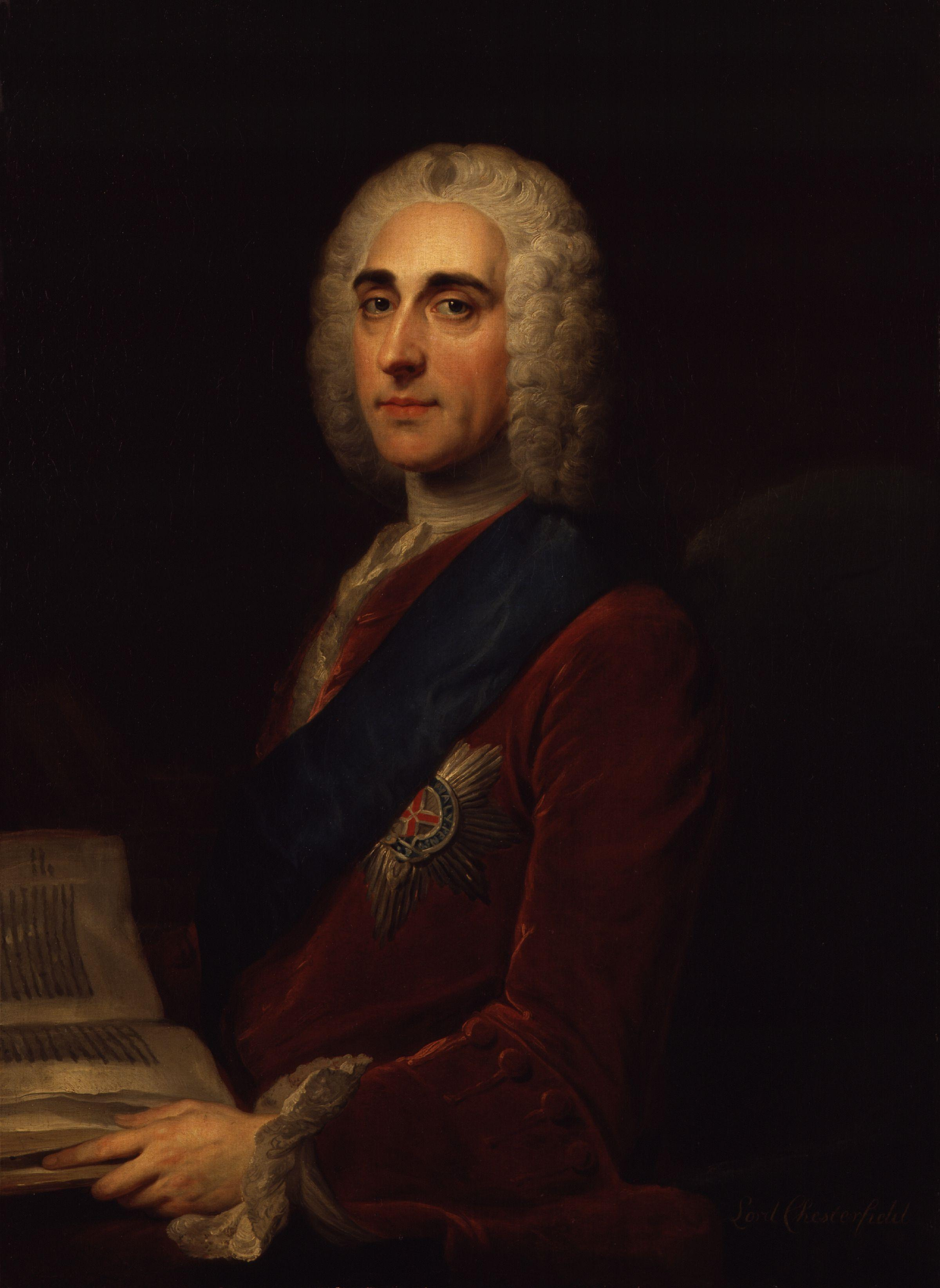
Philip Dormer Stanhope, 4th Earl of Chesterfield by William Hoare

William Hoare, RA (c. 1707 – 12 December 1792) was an English painter. From 1740 to 1759, he was the leading oil portraitist at Bath, Somerset until Thomas Gainsborough arrived in the town. Noted for his pastels, Hoare was a co-founder of the Royal Academy of Arts.

== Life ==
Born near Eye, Suffolk, Hoare received a gentleman's education in Faringdon and he may be the William Hoare baptised on 9 October 1707 in nearby Little Coxwell. He showed an aptitude for drawing and was sent to London to study under Giuseppe Grisoni, who had left Florence for London in 1715. When Grisoni returned to Italy in 1728, Hoare went with him, travelling to Rome and continuing his studies under the direction of Francesco Imperiali. He remained in Rome for nine years, returning to London in 1737/8.

Failing to establish himself in London, Hoare settled in Bath, an expanding spa town popular with the wealthier classes. He obtained numerous commissions, the most important being for official portraits of social leaders of the day (including George Frideric Handel) and political men (e.g., Prime Ministers Robert Walpole and William Pitt, 1st Earl of Chatham, c.1754). There are several versions of most of these, suggesting that he had a studio, and they were further publicised by the production of mezzotints by leading engravers of the day. Hoare himself was a delicate etcher and published a number of private plates, mostly of family and friends, including a Miss Hoare (probably Mary), Christopher Anstey and Henry Scudamore, 3rd Duke of Beaufort. His pastels were influenced by Rosalba Carriera.

William Hoare was the first fashionable portraitist to settle in Bath, and he was the leading portraitist there until the arrival of Thomas Gainsborough in 1759. He remained the favourite of his powerful patron Thomas Pelham-Holles, 1st Duke of Newcastle, his family, followers and political associates. Included amongst his other important patrons were Henry Herbert, 9th Earl of Pembroke and Philip Stanhope, 4th Earl of Chesterfield, and the Duke of Beaufort. With Gainsborough and Joshua Reynolds, he was a founding member of the Royal Academy of Arts.

Hoare was closely involved with the running of the Royal Mineral Water Hospital in Bath from 1742. He served as a governor of the hospital, his aim was to develop specialist treatments for rheumatic disorders. Where he became acquainted with Bath's notable visitors and the neighbouring landed families. Chalmers described him as 'an ingenious and amiable English painter'. He died at Bath on 10 December 1792. Interred at the vault of St Swithins Church, Bath.

His son, Prince Hoare, achieved fame as a painter and dramatist. His daughter Mary Hoare was also a noted painter.

== Works ==
Hoare's oil painting Dr Oliver and Mr Pierce examining patients with Paralysis, Rheumatism and Leprosy hung prominently at the Royal Mineral Water Hospital until 2019, when it was transferred to a new building at Bath's Royal United Hospital site.

Portrait of Ayuba Suleiman Diallo by William Hoare, was first seen by the public in December 2009 when it came up for auction and sold for over £500,000. The new owner unnamed wished to take it out the country but was stopped due to its national importance.

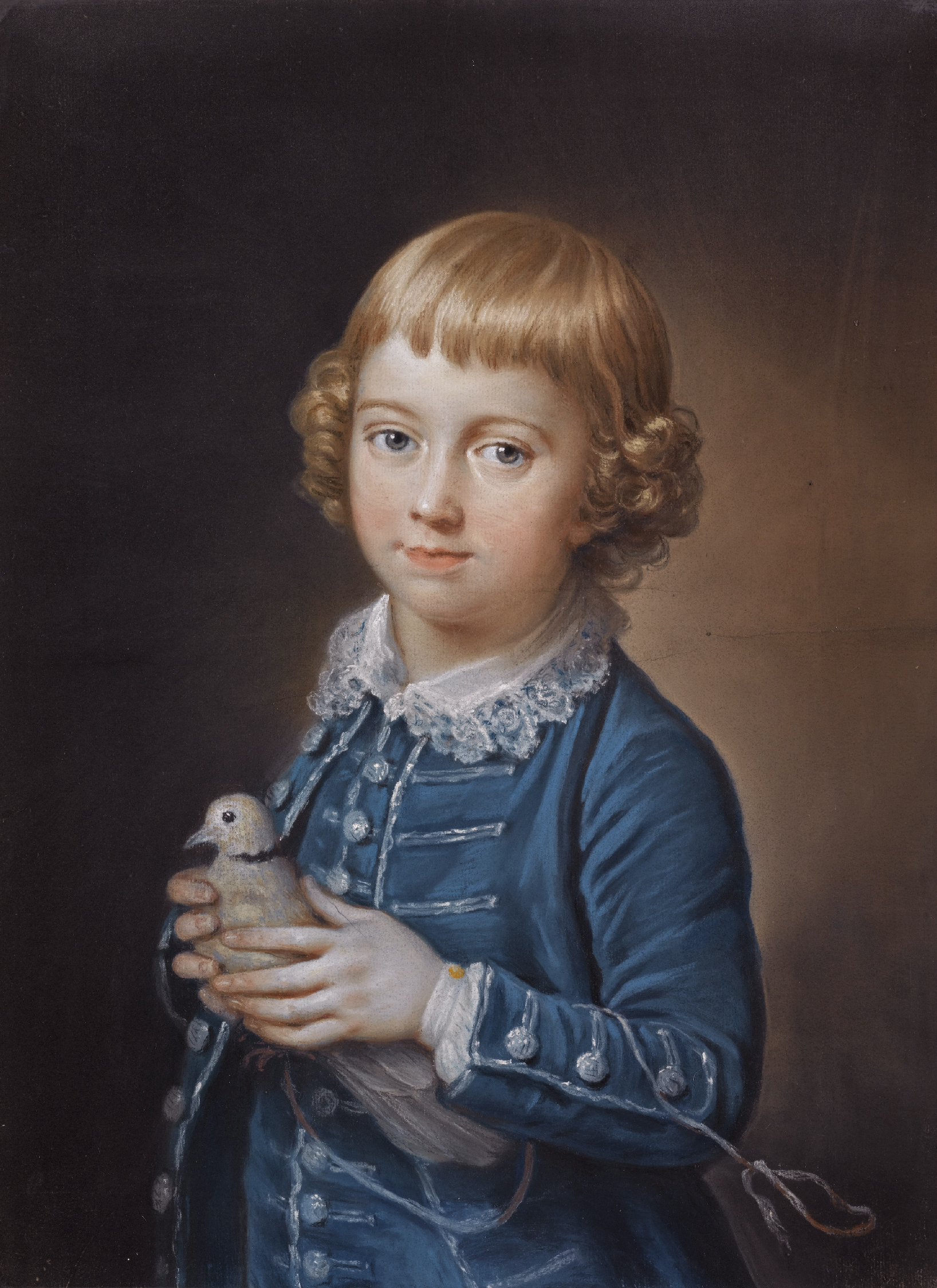
George Brudenell-Bruce (Lord Bruce)

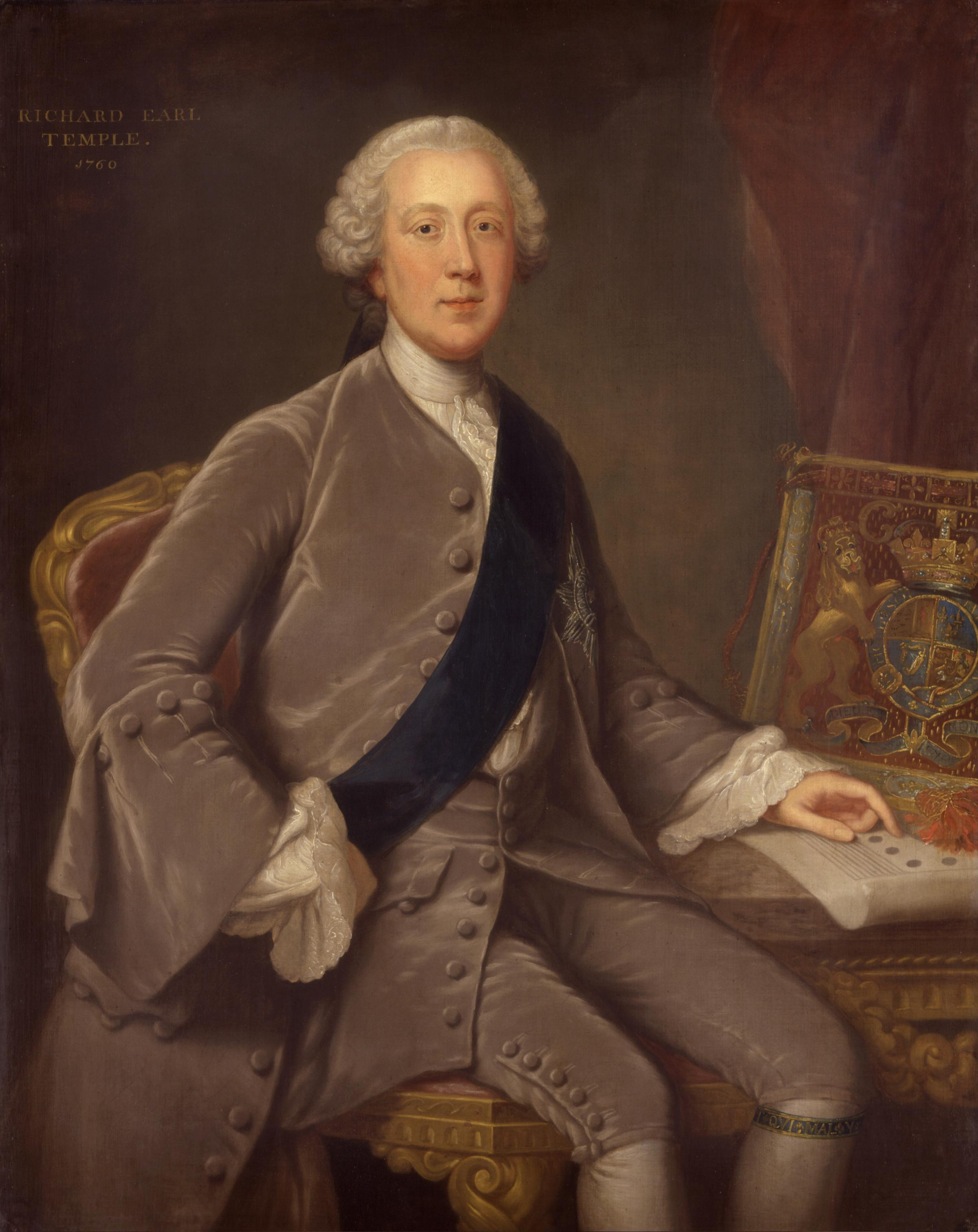
Richard Grenville-Temple, 2nd Earl Temple

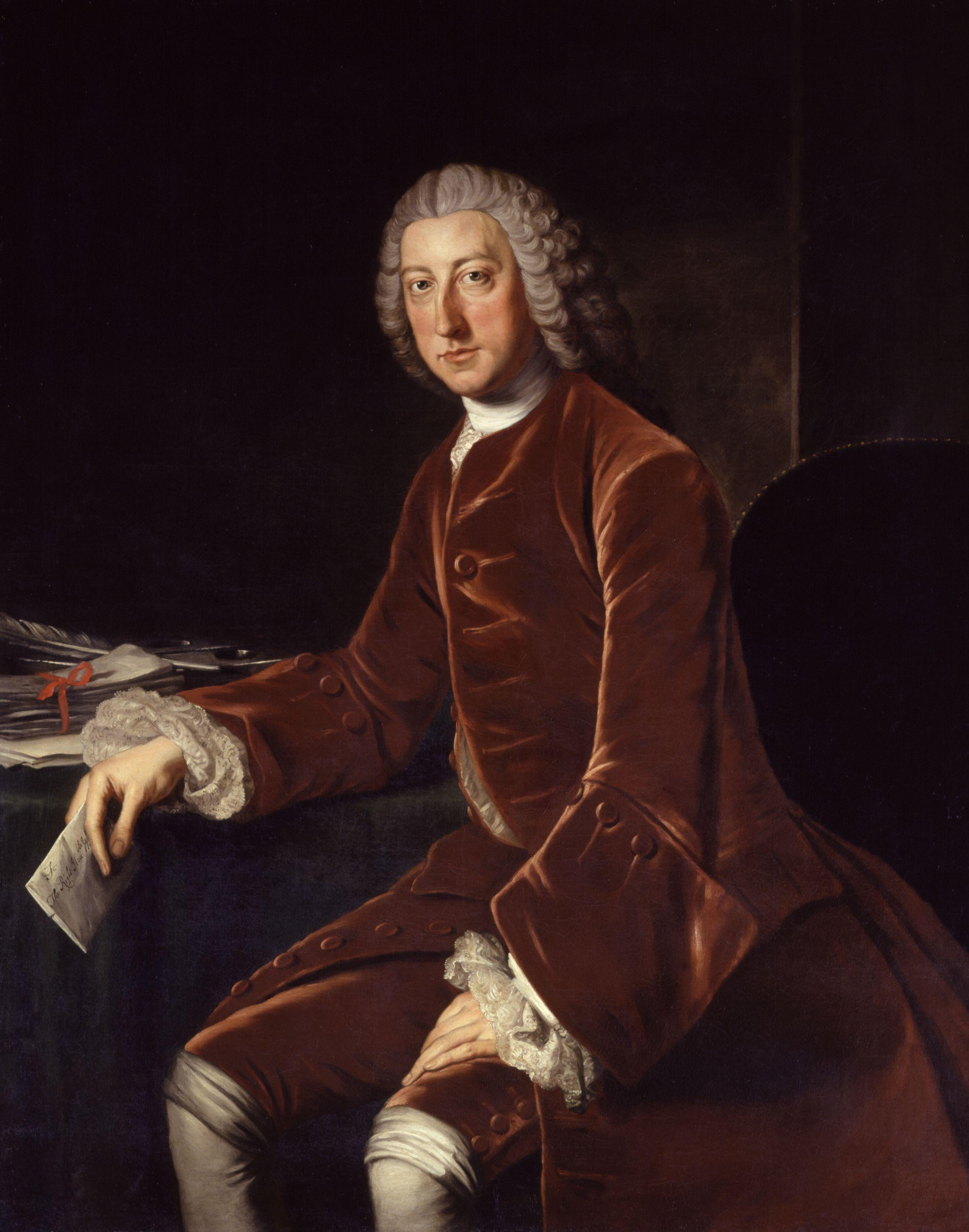
William Pitt, 1st Earl of Chatham

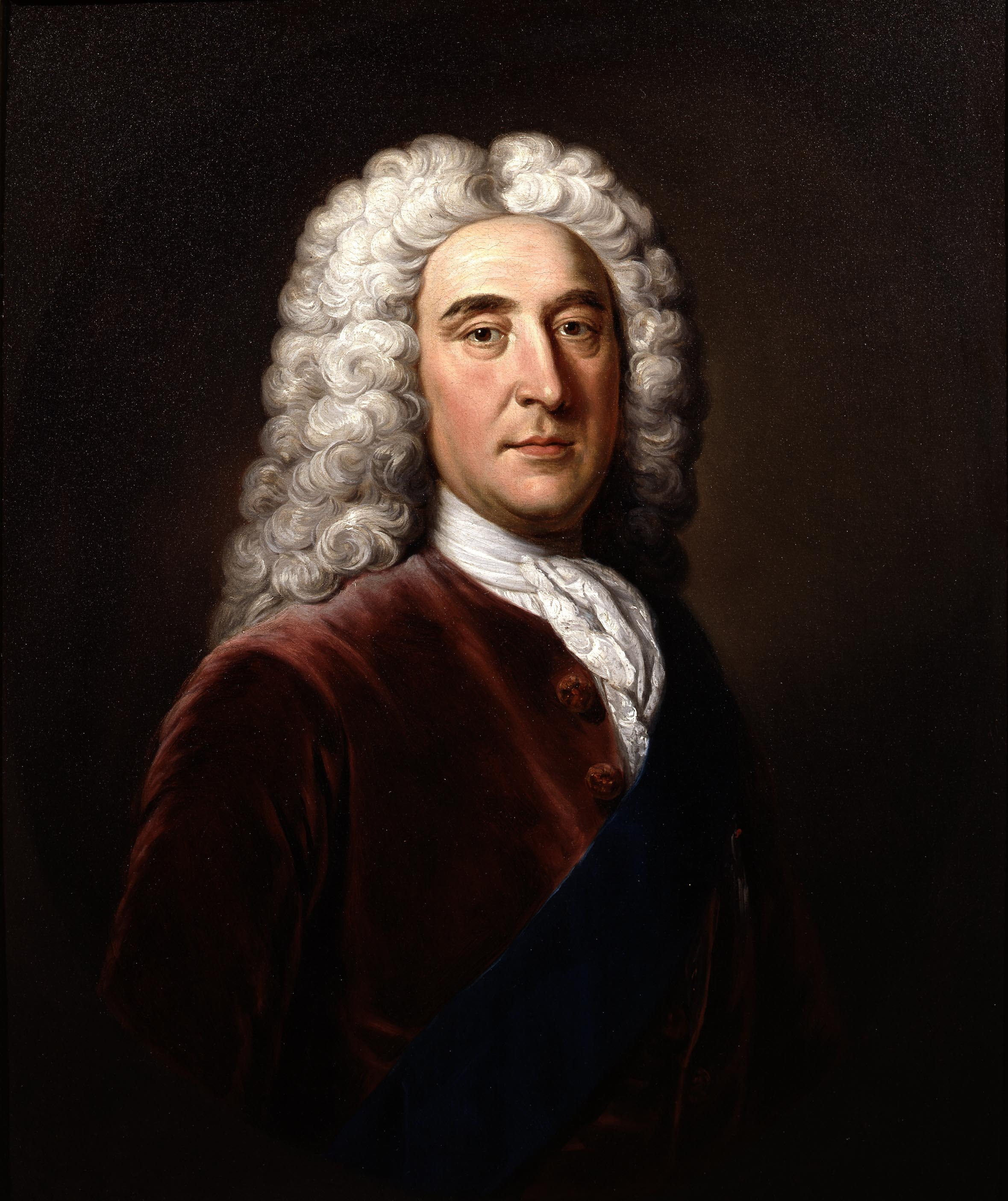
Duke of Newcastle, c.1750

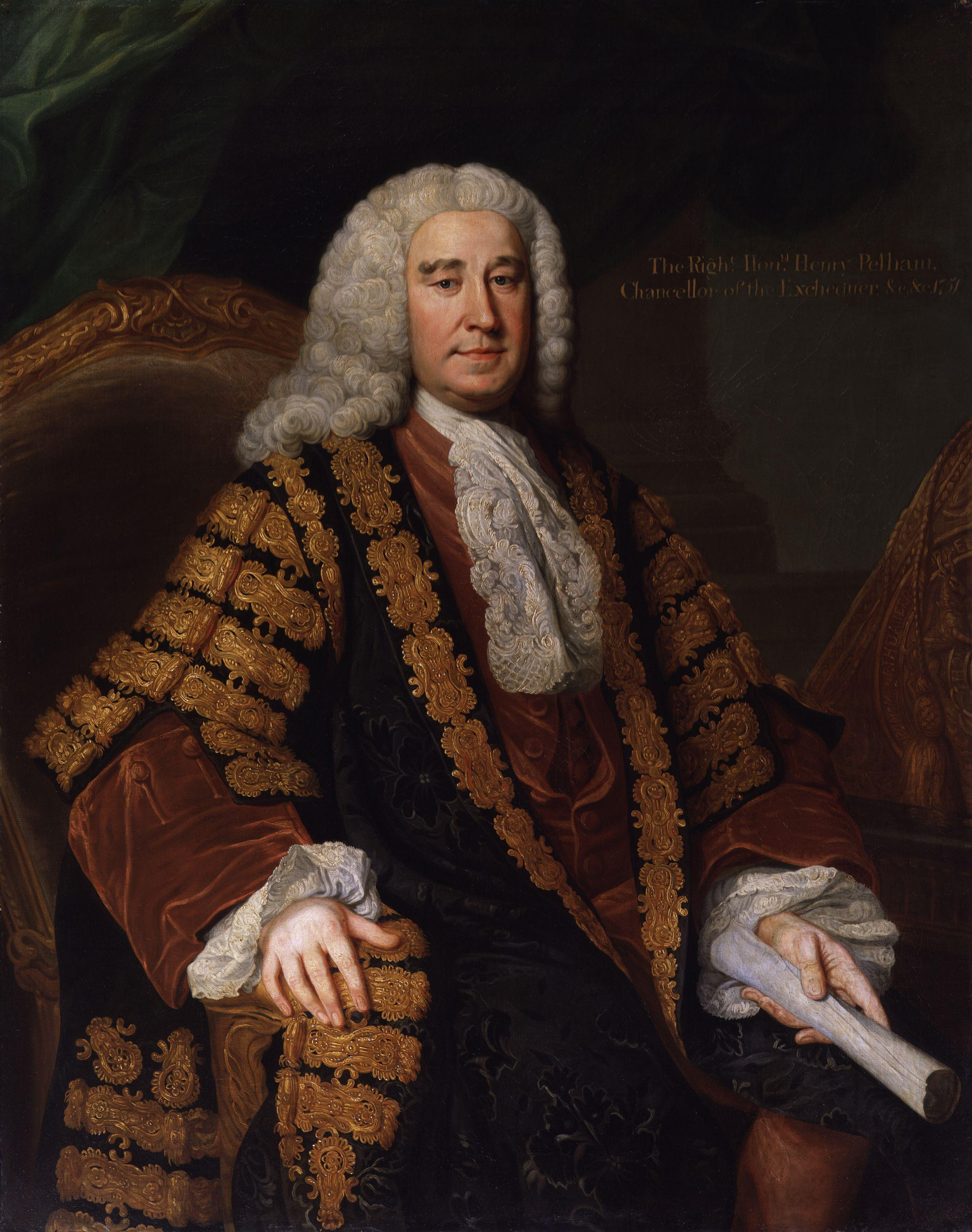
Portrait of Henry Pelham, 1751

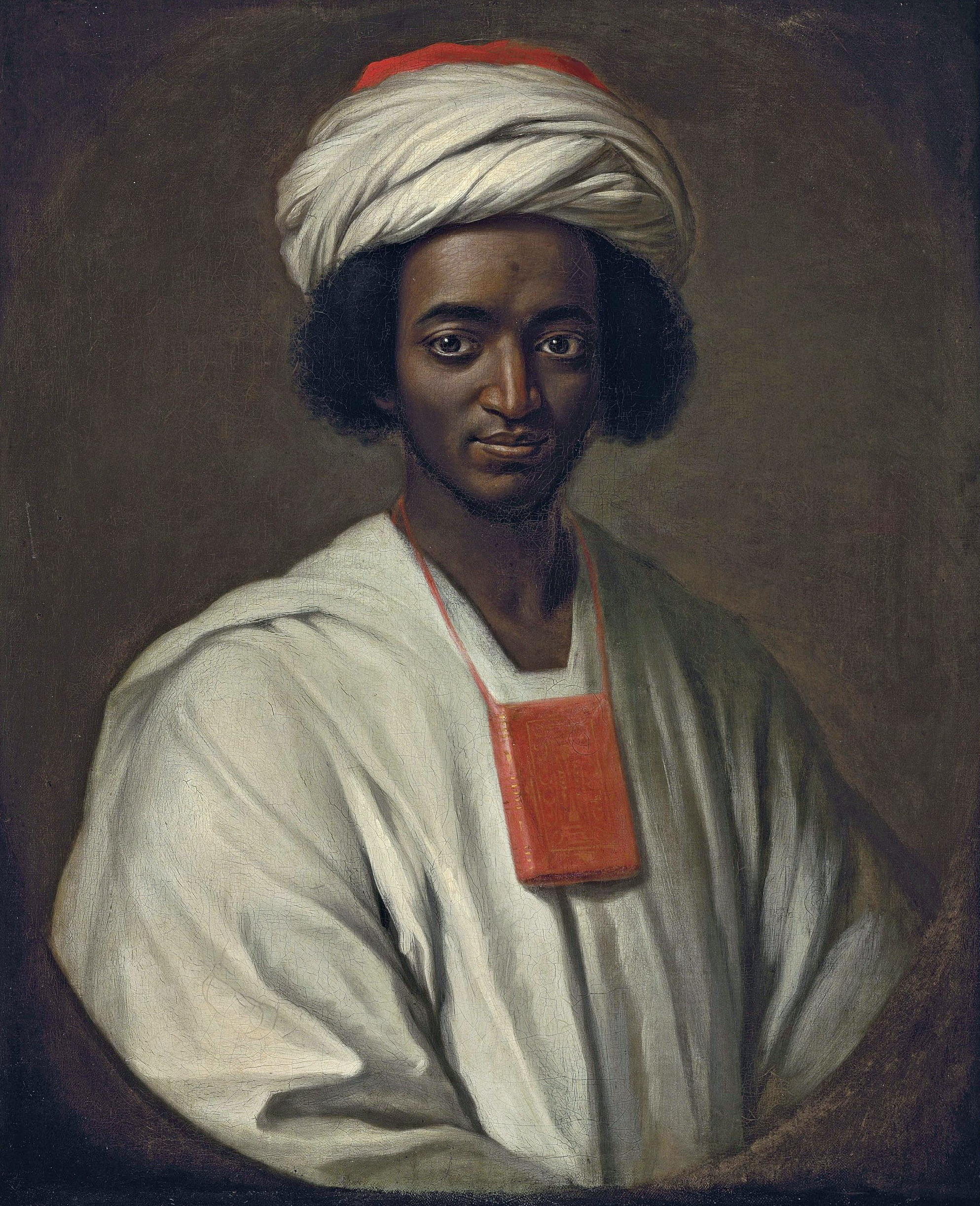
Portrait of Ayuba Suleiman Diallo

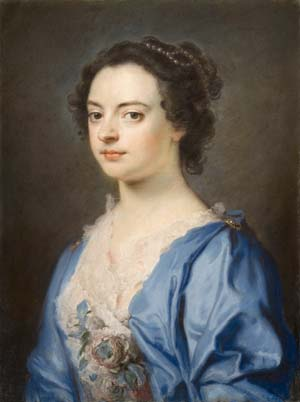
Portrait of a Lady

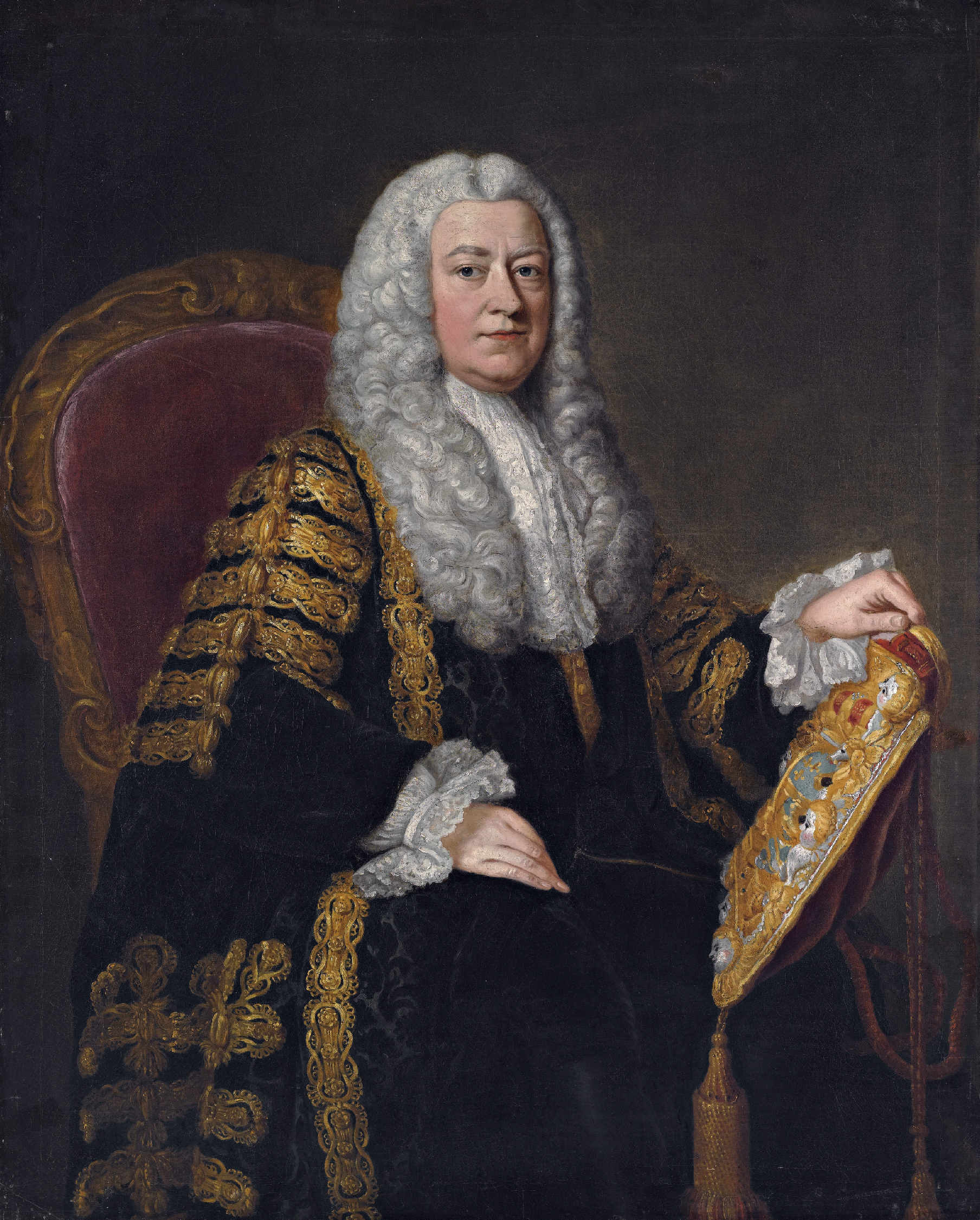
Philip Yorke, 1st Earl of Hardwicke

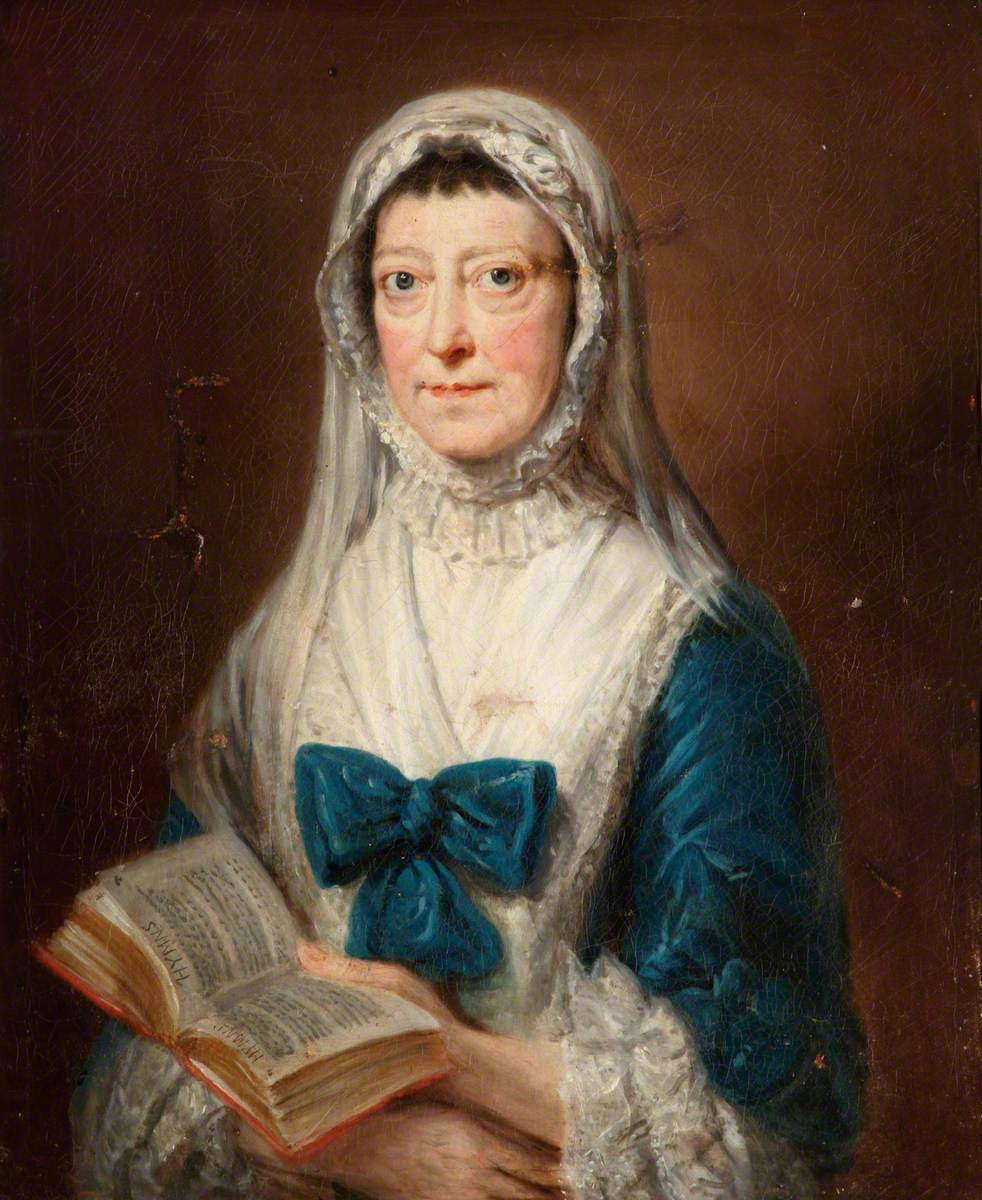
Lady Frances Shirley, National Trust

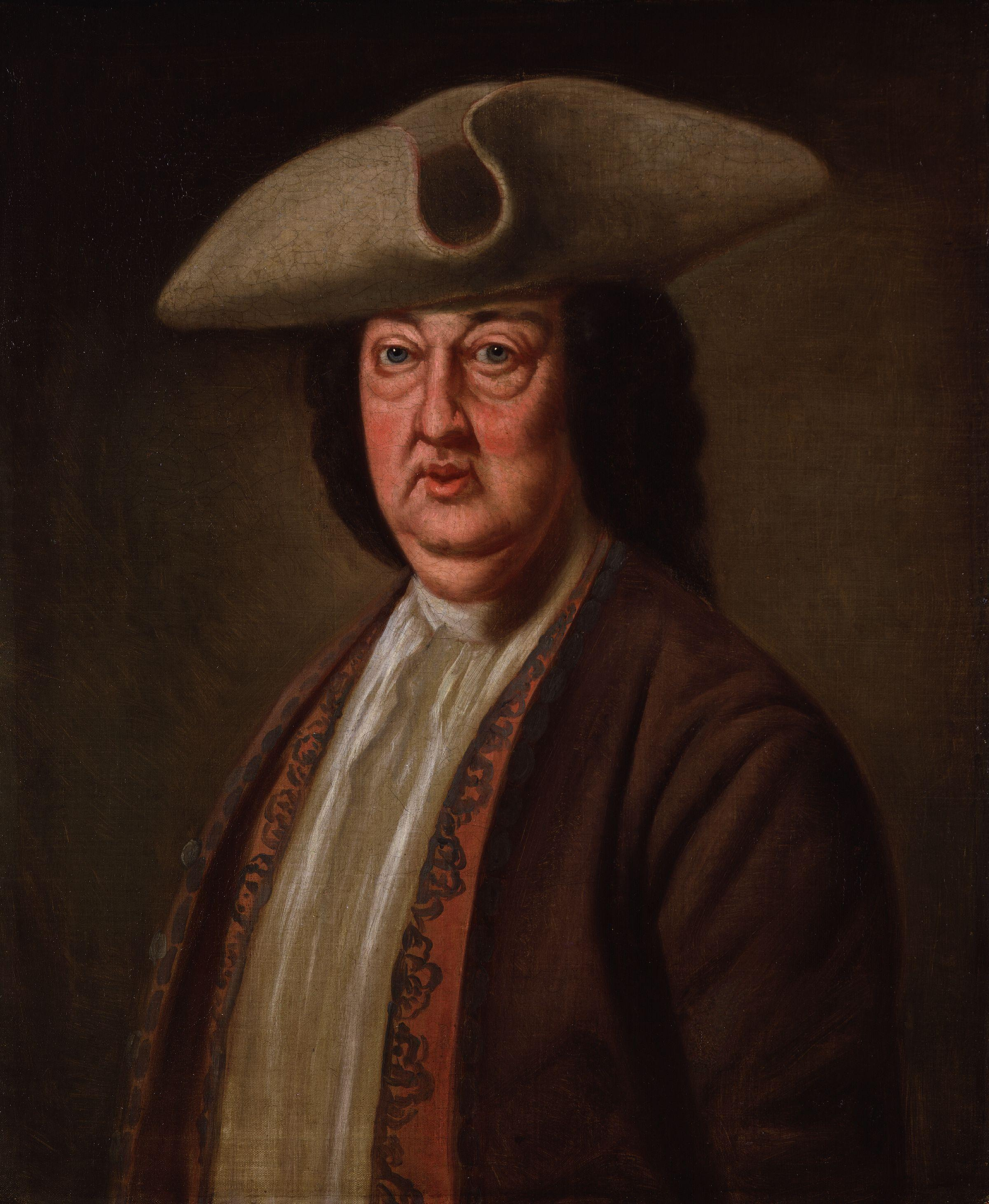
Richard ('Beau') Nash

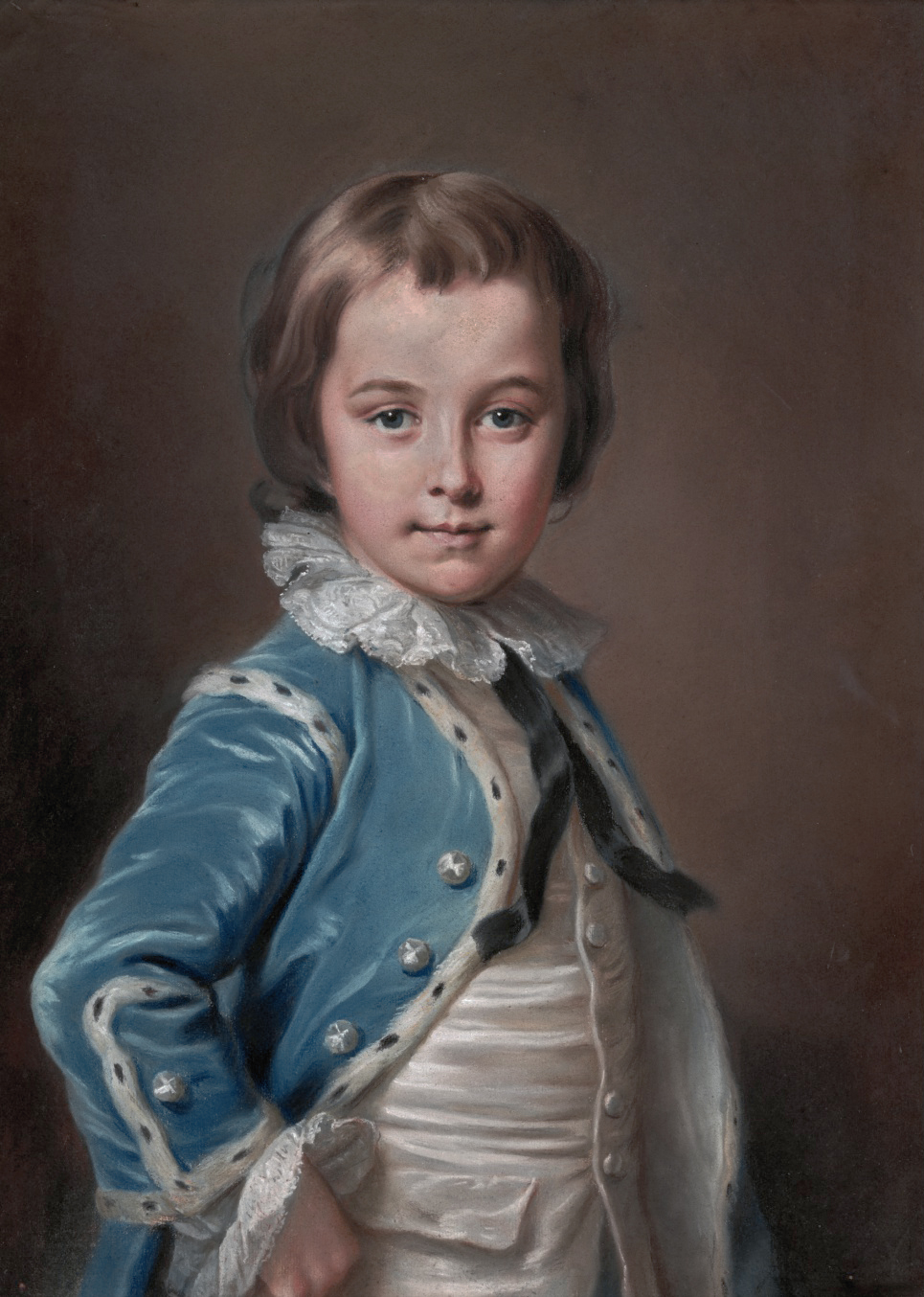
Henry Fiennes Pelham-Clinton

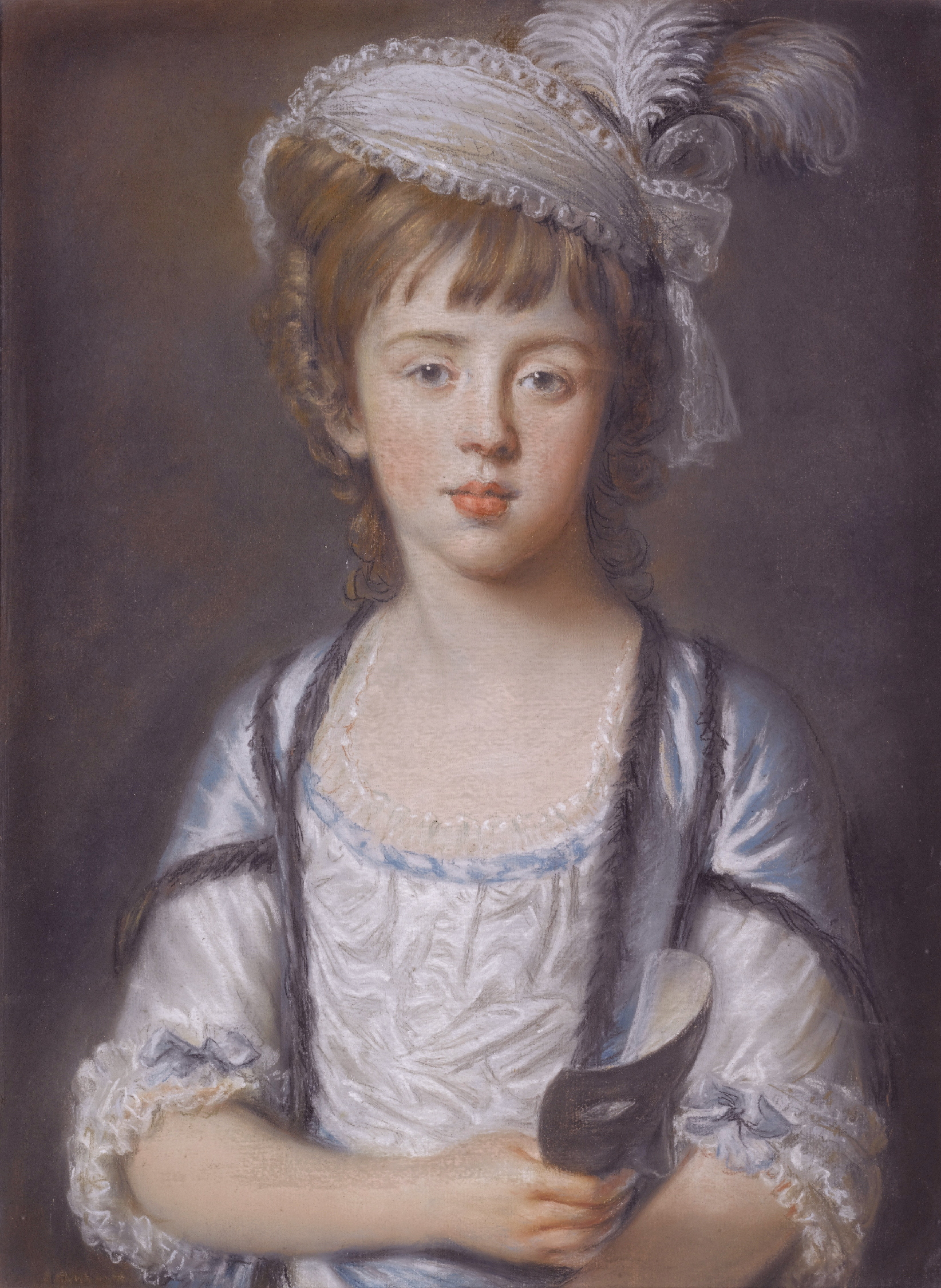
Frances Elizabeth Brudenell-Bruce

== Bibliography ==
- Holbrook, M. (1973). "Painters in Bath in the eighteenth century". Apollo. 98: 375–84.
- Newby, Evelyn (1986). "The Hoares of Bath". Bath History. 1: 90–127. ISBN 0-86299-294-X
- Newby, Evelyn (1990). William Hoare of Bath RA, 1707–92 (exhibition catalogue ed.). Bath: Victoria Art Gallery. ISBN 0-86299-897-2.
- Newby, Evelyn (2006a) "William Hoare (of Bath)", Grove Art Online, Oxford University Press, retrieved on 15 August 2007 (subscription required)
- Newby, Evelyn (2006b) "Hoare, William (1707/8–1792)", Oxford Dictionary of National Biography, Oxford University Press, online edn, accessed 15 Aug 2007
- Neil Jeffares, Dictionary of pastellists before 1800, online edition
