= Dore Lake =

Hamlet in Saskatchewan, Canada

- Northern hamlet
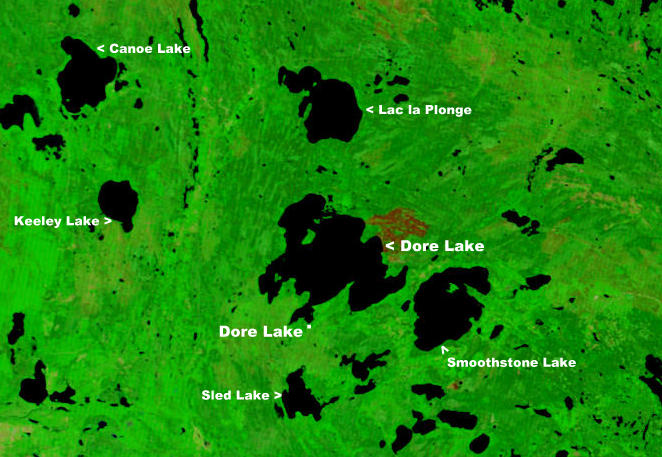
- NASA image of Dore Lake on Doré Lake

- Location in Saskatchewan Dore Lake (Canada)
- Coordinates: 54.6261°N 107.3959°W
- Province: Saskatchewan
- Elevation: 459 m (1,506 ft)

Population
  - Total: 37
- Highways: 924
- Waterways: Doré Lake

Dore Lake is a northern hamlet located on the southern shore of South Bay of Doré Lake, which is one of the largest lakes in northern Saskatchewan. Its name is the French word for "walleye". The community is accessed by Highway 924 and by Dore Lake Airport.

Dore Lake has lodges and other accommodations for tourists that provide access to Doré Lake, including Dore Lake Lodge, The Reel Retreat, and Dore Lake Fish'n Camp RV Park. Dore Lake Recreation Site (Michel Point) is about 16 kilometres (9.9 mi) to the north-east.

== Demographics ==
In the 2021 Census of Population conducted by Statistics Canada, Dore Lake had a population of 37 living in 19 of its 31 total private dwellings, a change of 23.3% from its 2016 population of 30. With a land area of 7.94 km^{2} (3.07 sq mi), it had a population density of 4.7/km^{2} (12.1/sq mi) in 2021.

== See also ==
- List of communities in Northern Saskatchewan
- List of communities in Saskatchewan
- List of Indian reserves in Saskatchewan
- Tourism in Saskatchewan
