= Doré River =

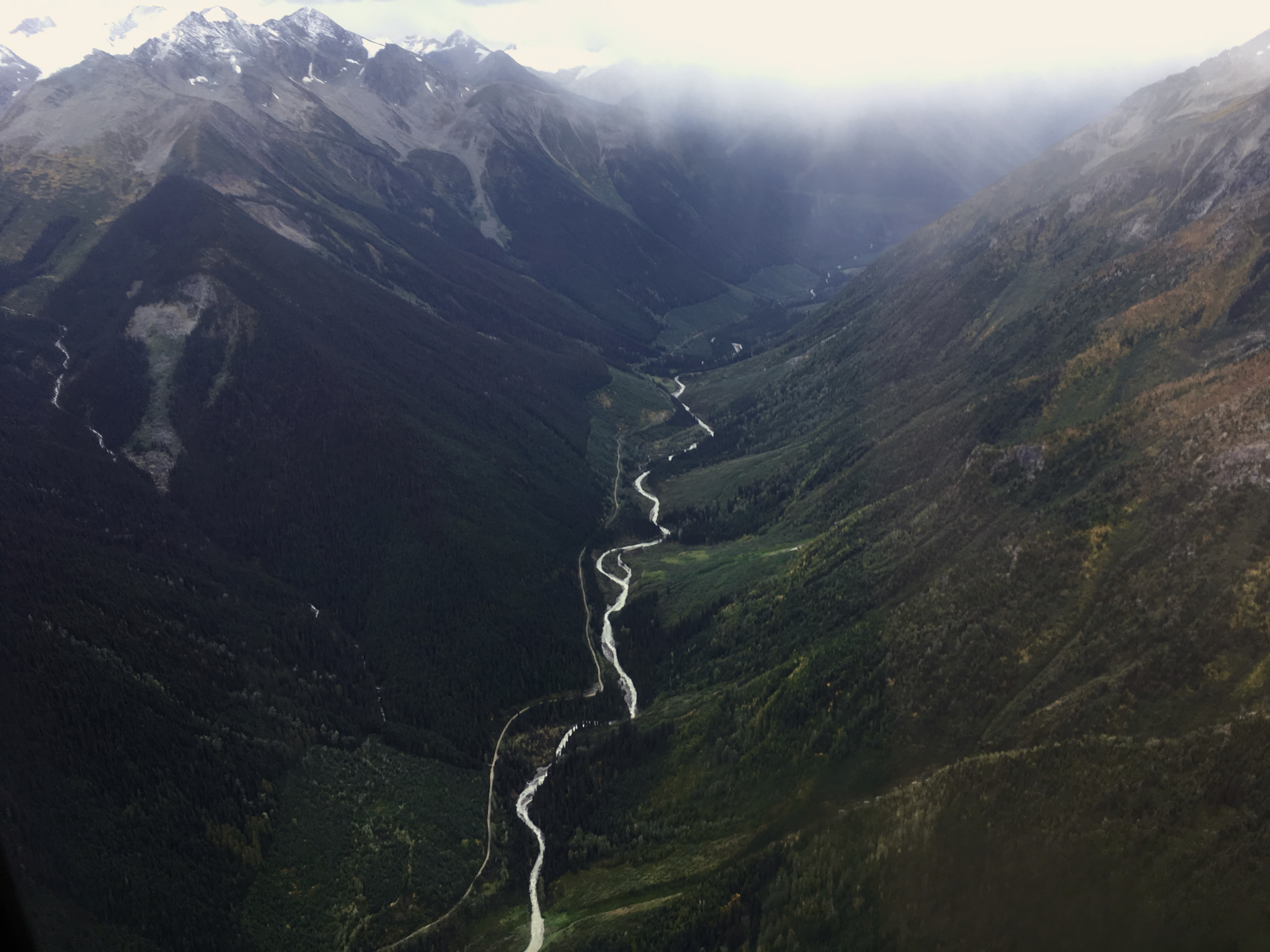

Location
- Country: Canada
- Province: British Columbia
- District: Cariboo Land District

Physical characteristics
- Source: Cariboo Mountains
  - coordinates: 53°5′3″N 120°24′46″W
  - elevation: 2,145 m (7,037 ft)
- Mouth: Fraser River
  - location: Robson Valley
  - coordinates: 53°20′4″N 120°11′38″W
  - elevation: 686 m (2,251 ft)
- Discharge
  - location: gage 08KA001
  - average: 14.1 m^{3}/s (500 cu ft/s)
  - minimum: 0.592 m^{3}/s (20.9 cu ft/s)
  - maximum: 131 m^{3}/s (4,600 cu ft/s)

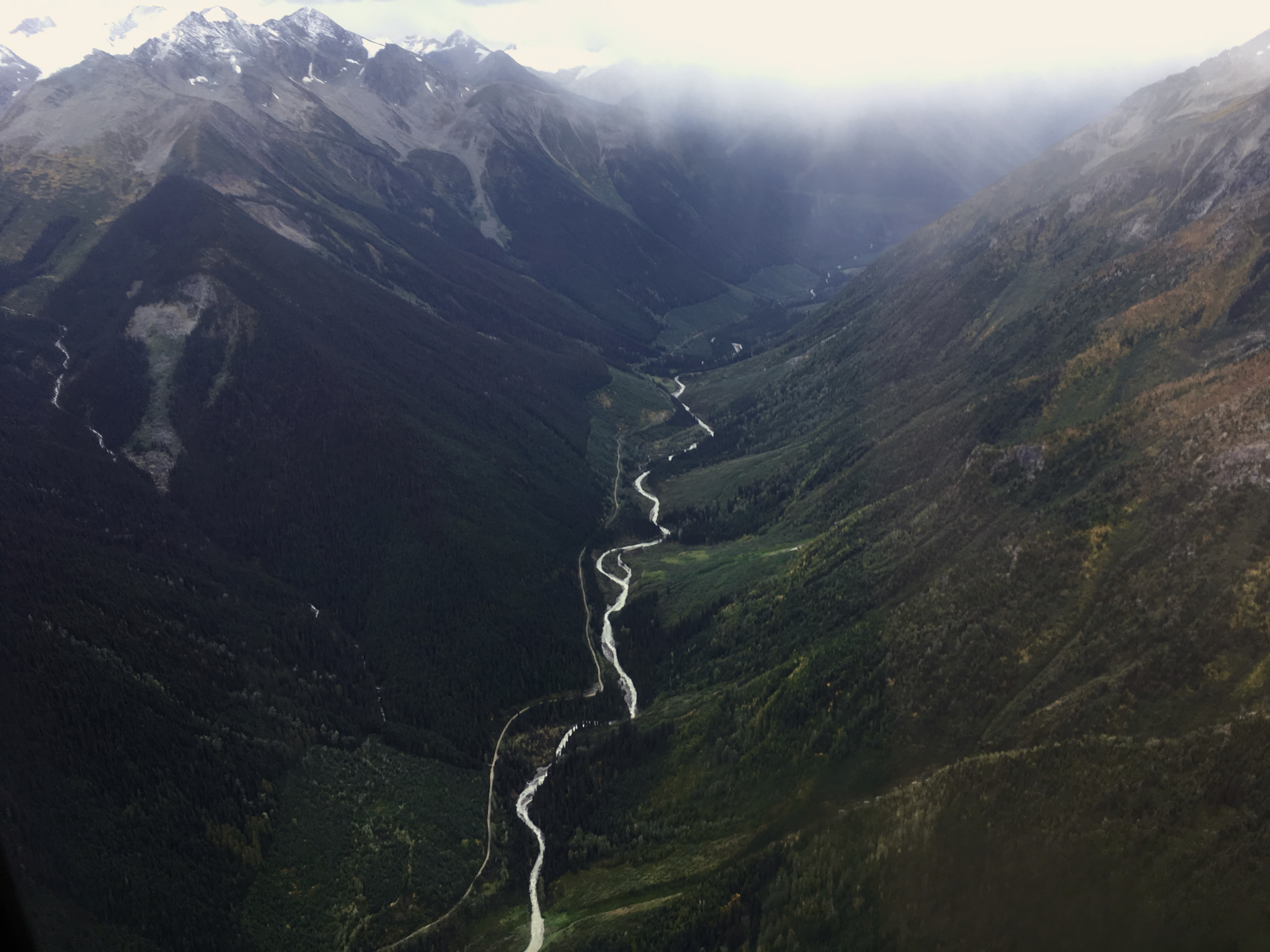

The Doré River is a tributary of the Fraser River in the Canadian province of British Columbia.

According to a trapper named Jack Damon, the river was originally called Fifty Mile Creek and was given the name doré, French for "golden", by a Norwegian prospector named Olson.

== Course ==
The Doré River originates in the Cariboo Mountains, flowing generally north to join the Fraser River in the Robson Valley portion of the Rocky Mountain Trench just north of McBride.

== See also ==
- List of rivers of British Columbia
