= Doré Lake =

Lake in Saskatchewan, Canada

- Location of Doré Lake in Saskatchewan Doré Lake (Canada)

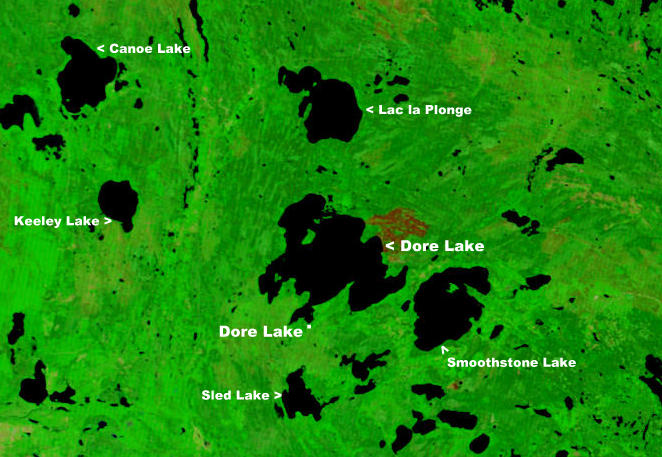
- NASA image of Doré Lake
- Location: Northern Administration District, Saskatchewan
- Coordinates: 54°46′N 107°18′W
- Part of: Churchill River drainage basin
- Primary inflows: Sled River
- Primary outflows: Doré River to Beaver River
- Catchment area: 2,435 km^{2} (940 sq mi)
- Basin countries: Canada
- Surface area: 64,000 ha (160,000 acres)
- Average depth: 10.9 m (36 ft)
- Max. depth: 20.4 m (67 ft)
- Water volume: 6.68 km^{3} (5,420,000 acre⋅ft)
- Residence time: 175 years
- Shore length^{1}: 195 km (121 mi)
- Surface elevation: 455 m (1,493 ft)
- Islands: Big Island; Iskwasoo Island; Burnt Island; Smith Island; Narrow Island; Rock Island
- Settlements: Dore Lake
- ^{1} Shore length is not a well-defined measure.

Doré Lake is a lake in the Canadian province of Saskatchewan in the basin of the Beaver River. Doré is the French Canadian term for 'walleye'. The lake is north-west of Smoothstone Lake and the Waskesiu Upland in the Mid-Boreal Upland ecozone of Canada and is surrounded by boreal forests. Saskatoon, Saskatchewan's largest city, is about 328 kilometres (204 mi) to the south. The northern village of Dore Lake is located on South Bay and is accessed from Highway 924 and Dore Lake Airport. Doré Lake is the seventh largest lake in Saskatchewan.

There are several lodges, parks, protected areas, recreational facilities, hiking trails, and outfitters around Doré Lake, most of which are along the southern shore at Dore Lake and Michel Point. Tower Lodge Outfitting is on a peninsula at the eastern end on East Bay and is accessed from Highway 917.

== Description ==
At 640 km^{2} (250 sq mi), Doré Lake is the seventh largest lake in Saskatchewan. Its main inflow is Sled River, which originates at Sled Lake and flows into Bazill Bay at the west end of Doré Lake. The outflow is Doré River, which flows out from Bazill Bay and heads north-northwest into Beaver River. Bays around the lake include South Bay, East Bay, Northern Bay, Charbonneau Bay, and Bazill Bay. There are several islands throughout the lake including Big Island, Iskwasoo Island, and Burnt Island in the north section and Smith Island in Bazill Bay.

== Michel Point ==
Michel Point is a peninsula at the southern end that juts out 16 kilometres (9.9 mi) into Doré Lake. The peninsula is the location of Dore Lake Recreation Site (54.6985°N 107.2332°W), Michel Point Lodge, and Camp Carmel. Access is to Michel Point and its amenities is from Dore Road, which branches off Highway 924 at Dore Lake.

The recreation site has a campground, hiking trails, a 3-kilometre (1.9 mi) long white-sand beach for swimming, a boat launch, and a fish filleting station. The campground has non-potable water, outdoor toilets, and sewage disposal.

The Dore Lake Trails traverse Michel Point and go around South Bay towards Bazill Bay. The trails are open year-round and are available for hiking, biking, ATVing, cross-country skiing, snowshoeing, and snowmobiling. They are maintained by volunteers and are free to use.

== Protected areas ==
There are two wildlife refuges and one ecological reserve at Doré Lake. At the lake's northern end is the 95.96 km^{2} (37.05 sq mi) Caribou Flats Ecological Reserve. It encompasses Northern Bay, Charbonneau Bay, the 213.3 ha (527-acre) Charbonneau Lake, Burnt Island, and Iskwasoo Island.

Bazill Wildlife Refuge (54.7268°N 107.5241°W) covers a small island just west of Smith Island in Bazill Bay. Rock Island Wildlife Refuge (54.7249°N 107.1628°W) is on Rock Island just east of Michel Point.

== Fish species ==
Fish commonly found in Doré Lake include walleye, northern pike, burbot, cisco, white sucker, yellow perch, and lake whitefish.

== See also ==
- List of lakes of Saskatchewan
- List of protected areas of Saskatchewan
- Tourism in Saskatchewan
