= Edward Hoare =

Edward Hoare may refer to:

- Edward Hoare (politician) (died 1765), Member of the Irish Parliament for Cork City, 1710–1713
- Sir Edward Hoare, 2nd Baronet (1745–1814), of the Hoare Baronets
- Edward Hoare (priest) (1802–1877), Irish Anglican priest
- Edward Hoare (cricketer) (1812–1894), English cricketer
- Edward Brodie Hoare (1841–1911), British Member of Parliament for Hampstead, 1888–1902
- Edward A. Hoare, chief engineer for the 1919 Quebec Bridge, the longest cantilever bridge span in the world
- Edward Hoare (RAF airman) (1890–1973), World War I flying ace
