= John Hore (disambiguation) =

John Hore may refer to:

- John Hore (1680–1763), an English engineer
- John Hore (footballer, born 1947), English footballer who played for and managed Plymouth Argyle
- John Hore (footballer, born 1982), English footballer who played for Carlisle United
- John Hore (MP for Bridport) (died c. 1452), English MP for Bridport (UK Parliament constituency)
- John Hore (MP for Cambridgeshire) (died c. 1434), English MP for Cambridgeshire, and for Huntingdonshire
- John Hore (MP for Dungarvan), Irish Jacobite politician
- John Hore (songwriter) (1944-2022), later called John Hore Grenell or John Grenell, New Zealand country singer and songwriter
- John Hore (rugby union) (1907–1970), New Zealand rugby union player, All Black.

== See also ==
- John Hoar (pirate) (died 1697), American/Irish pirate active in the Red Sea
- John Hoar (died 1704), American militia leader during King Philip's War
