= Joe Hoare =

English footballer (1881–1947)

Personal information
- Full name: Joseph Henry Hoare
- Date of birth: November 1881
- Place of birth: Southampton, England
- Date of death: 24 March 1947 (aged 65)
- Place of death: West End, Hampshire, England
- Position: Full-back

Youth career
- Southampton Oxford

Senior career*
Years	Team	Apps	(Gls)
1902–1903	Southampton	4	(0)
1903–1904	Liverpool	7	(0)
1904–1905	Southampton	3	(0)
1905–1908	Bitterne Guild		
1908–1909	Salisbury City		
1909–1912	Bitterne Guild		
1912–1914	Woolston		
- * Club domestic league appearances and goals

Joseph Henry Hoare (November 1881 – 24 March 1947) was an English professional footballer who played as a full-back for Southampton and Liverpool in the 1900s.

== Playing career ==
Hoare was born in Southampton and trained as a carpenter and joiner, playing amateur football with Southampton Oxford F.C. He joined Southern League champions Southampton F.C. in 1902 and became understudy to England international George Molyneux. He made his debut on 25 October 1902 in a 2–0 victory over Luton Town but only made three further appearances during the 1902–03 season, at the end of which the "Saints" re-claimed the Southern League championship for the fifth time in seven years. Although he was considered to be "handicapped by a lack of weight, (he) more than compensated for this with his pluck and endurance". At the end of the season he received offers from Reading and Liverpool and chose the latter.

He made seven league appearances for Liverpool during the 1903–04 season, his debut coming on 24 October 1903 at home to Derby Co. with his final match coming against Sheffield United also at home on 12 March 1904.

After losing his place in the Liverpool side following an accident, he decided to return to the south coast, in time for Southampton's summer tour of South America, during which they played teams representing Argentina and Uruguay, winning 8–0 and 8–1 respectively. He went on to make three further league appearances for Southampton at the start of the 1904–05 season, before giving way to new signing, Bob Benson.

He decided to retire from professional football before the end of the season and became the proprietor of a tobacconist's shop in Woolston. He then reverted to amateur football with Bitterne Guild F.C., Salisbury City and Woolston F.C., although he did make one further appearance for the Saints in the 1907 Southern Charity Cup Final.

He died at West End, Hampshire on 24 March 1947.
