= Prince Hoare (younger) =

English painter and dramatist (1755–1834)

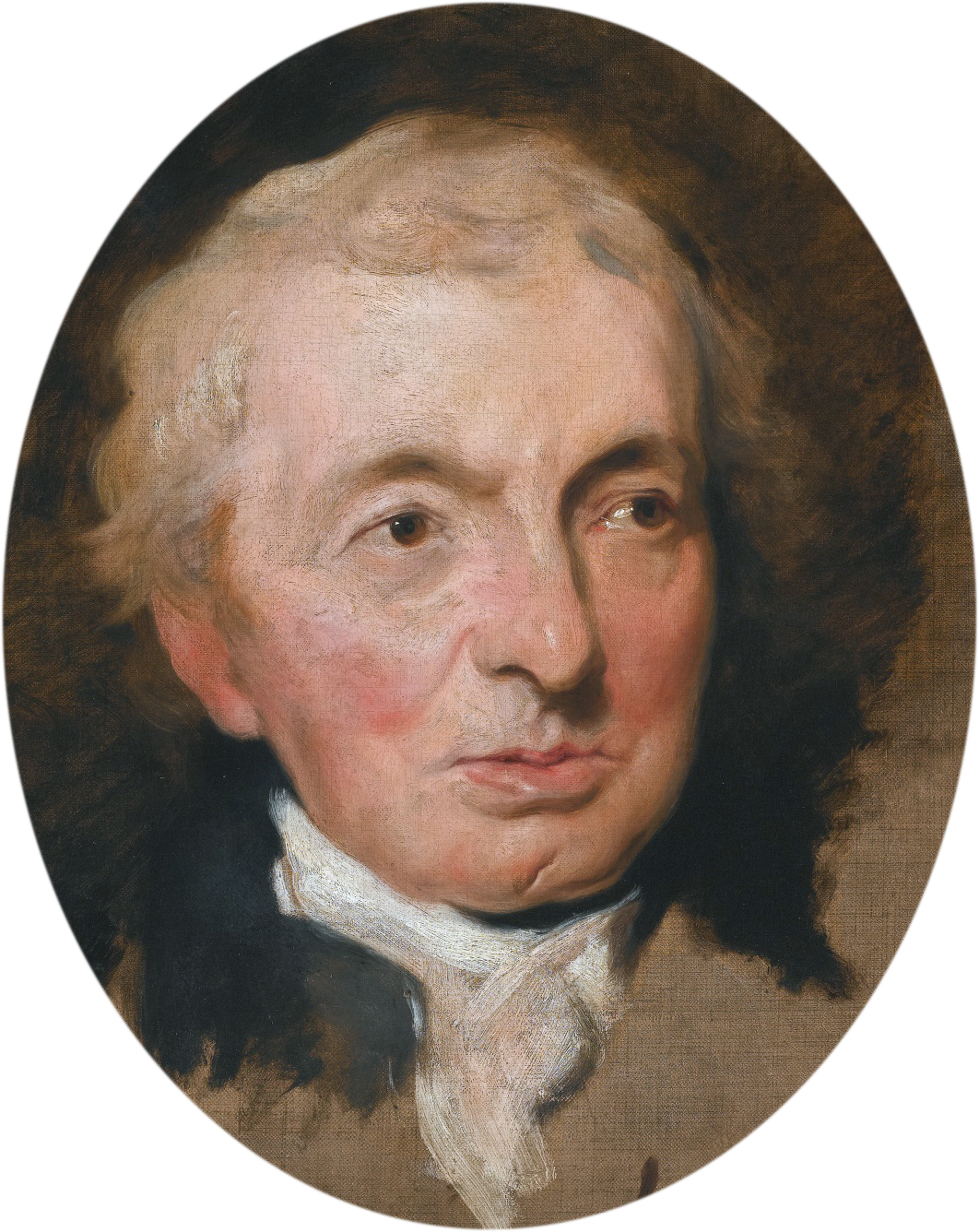
Prince Hoare (1755–1834) (Thomas Lawrence, c. 1826)

Prince Hoare (1755 – 22 December 1834) was an English painter, art critic, dramatist and librettist. ('Prince' is a given name, not a royal title.) Among many interventions in Britain's art scene around 1800, Hoare was active in the Royal Academy as its Secretary for Foreign Correspondence.

== Life ==
Prince Hoare was born in Bath, the son of painter William Hoare and his wife. He was named 'Prince' after his father's brother, a sculptor. He studied art from an early age, and became well known as a painter of portraits and historical scenes. His sister Mary Hoare was also a noted painter. He also became a leading facilitator of art criticism and controversy, beginning with Inquiry into the Requisite Cultivation and Present State of the Arts of Design in England (1806).

Later in his life, Hoare wrote 20 plays. He also compiled the Memoirs of Granville Sharp (1820), based on the British abolitionist's manuscripts, family documents and material from the African Institution, London.

== Selected works ==
- The Three and the Deuce (1795)
- Indiscretion (1800)

== Bibliography ==
- Newby, Evelyn (1986). "The Hoares of Bath". Bath History. 1: 90–127. ISBN 0-86299-294-X
- Prince Hoare at Art UK
- Loughlin-Chow, M. Clare. "Hoare, Prince (1755–1834)". Oxford Dictionary of National Biography (online ed.). Oxford University Press. doi:10.1093/ref:odnb/13384. (Subscription, Wikipedia Library access or UK public library membership required.)
