= Whore (disambiguation) =

Whore is a derogatory term meaning prostitute.

Whore(s) may also refer to:

== Film, television, and theatre ==
- Whore (1991 film), a British-American film directed by Ken Russell
- The Whores, a 1994 Italian film directed by Aurelio Grimaldi
- Whore (2004 film), a Spanish film directed by María Lidón
- Whore (2008 film), an American film directed by Thomas Dekker
- The Whore (2009 film), a Norwegian film directed by Reinert Kiil
- The Whore (2010 film), a German television film directed by Hansjörg Thurn
- "Whore" (Spartacus: Blood and Sand), a television episode
- Whores (play), a 2005 play by Lee Blessing

== Music ==
- Whores (band), an American noise rock band
- Whore (album) or the title song, by Dalbello, 1996
- "Whore" (song), by In This Moment, 2013
- "Whore", a song by Get Scared from Best Kind of Mess, 2011
- "Whore", a song by Wifiskeleton from Suburban Daredevil, 2024
- "Whores", a song by Psapp from Rear Moth, 2004

== See also ==
- Whore of Babylon
