= Nipekamew =

Nipekamew may refer to any of the following:

- Nipekamew Lake, a lake in Saskatchewan, Canada
- Nipekamew River, a river in Saskatchewan
- Nipekamew Creek, a creek in Saskatchewan
- Nipekamew Bay, a bay on Lac la Ronge in Saskatchewan
- Nipekamew Sand Cliffs, a landform in Saskatchewan
- East Trout–Nipekamew Lakes Recreation Site, a park in Saskatchewan
