= Steepbank Lake =

Lake in Saskatchewan, Canada

- Location in Saskatchewan Steepbank Lake (Canada)
- Location: Clarence-Steepbank Lakes Provincial Park, Saskatchewan
- Coordinates: 54.2664°N 105.1096°W
- Part of: Churchill River drainage basin
- Primary outflows: Bow River
- Basin countries: Canada
- Surface area: 150.3 ha (371 acres)
- Max. depth: 29.6 m (97 ft)
- Shore length^{1}: 10.7 km (6.6 mi)
- Surface elevation: 548 m (1,798 ft)
- ^{1} Shore length is not a well-defined measure.

Steepbank Lake is a lake in Clarence-Steepbank Lakes Provincial Park in the Canadian province of Saskatchewan. The lake is in a glacier-carved valley in the Boreal forest ecozone of Canada and is part of the Bow River chain of lakes near the headwaters of the Bow River, which is a tributary of Lac la Ronge in the Churchill River watershed.

Steepbank Lake is the farthest lake downstream in the Bow River chain of lakes that make up the heart of Clarence-Steepbank Lakes Provincial Park. While not directly along the course of the Bow River, at the east end of the lake is a short stream that connects it to the river. The lake itself is in a steep valley that resembles a coastal fjord, hence the name "Steepbank". The nearest highway is Highway 927 to the east. An access road from the highway connects other lakes farther upstream, including Ridge, Jasper, Kit, and Clarence but no longer reaches Steepbank and is only accessible by hiking or ATVing. At the east end of the lake are two campsites.

Fish commonly found in Steepbank Lake and neighbouring lakes include northern pike, walleye, lake trout, white sucker, and yellow perch.

== See also ==
- List of lakes of Saskatchewan
- Tourism in Saskatchewan
