= Nipekamew River =

River in Saskatchewan, Canada

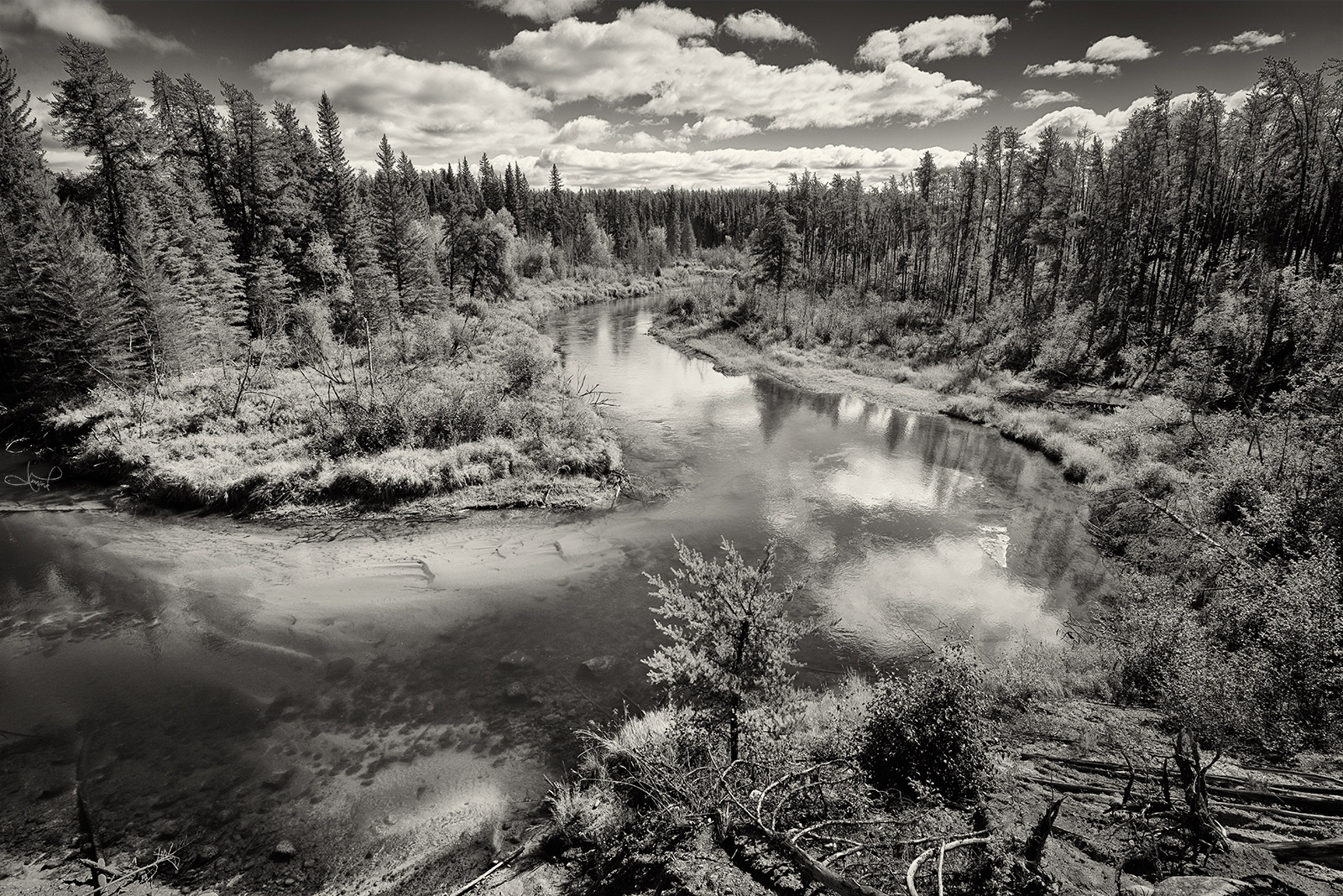

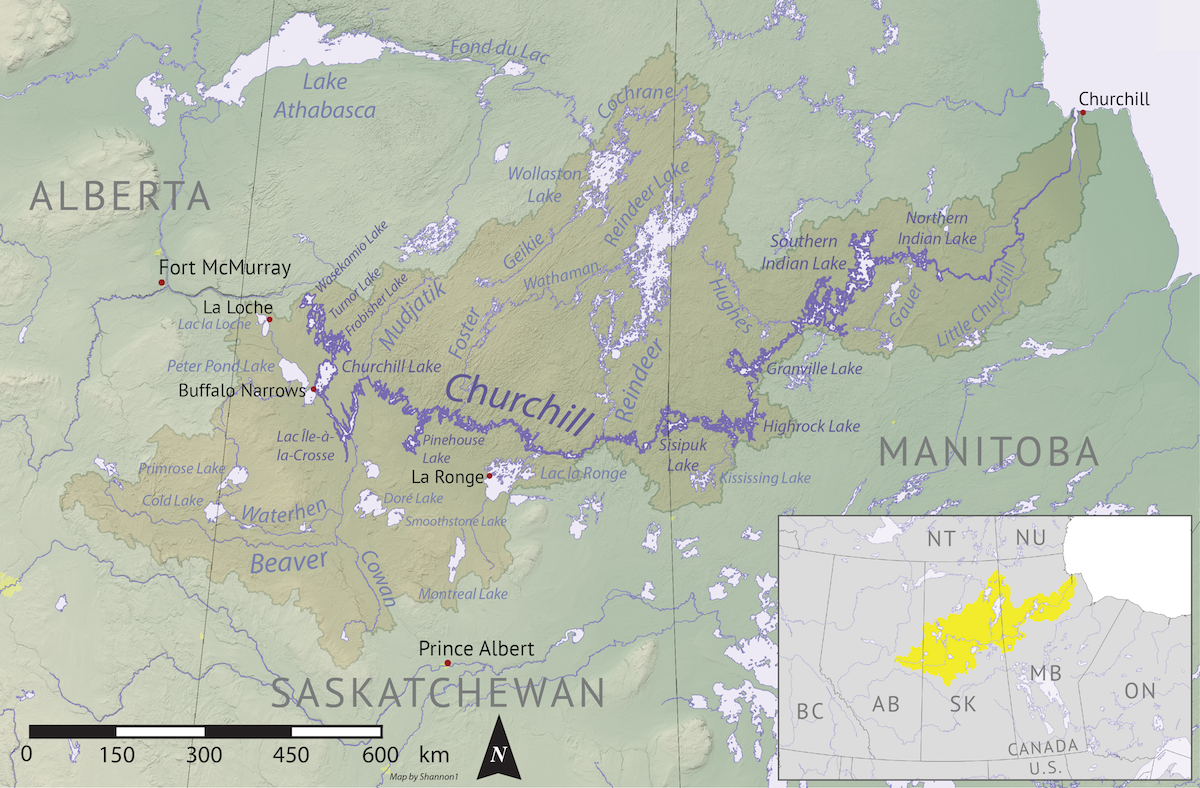
- Churchill River drainage basin

- Location of the mouth in Saskatchewan Nipekamew River (Canada)

Location
- Country: Canada
- Province: Saskatchewan

Physical characteristics
- Source: Nipekamew Lake
  - coordinates: 54.4658°N 104.9885°W
  - elevation: 500 m (1,600 ft)
- Mouth: Lac la Ronge
  - coordinates: 54.9769°N 104.8654°W
  - elevation: 360 m (1,180 ft)

Basin features
- River system: Churchill River

Nipekamew River is a river in the Canadian province of Saskatchewan. The river's source is Nipekamew Lake at the north-western edge of the Cub Hills and its mouth is in Nipekamew Bay at the southern shore of Lac la Ronge. From the northern tip of Nipekamew Lake, the river travels from south to north through muskeg and boreal forest en route to Lac la Ronge. Lake la Ronge empties north into the Churchill River through Rapid River.

Nipekamew River is in the Northern Saskatchewan Administration District and the only highway to cross the river is Highway 165. Highway 912 parallels the river from Nipekamew Lake to Wapawekka Lake and Lac la Ronge. Adjacent to the mouth of the river is Fox Point Indian Reserve.

The upper reaches of the river's watershed include East Trout Lake, tributaries from the hills of Clarence-Steepbank Lakes Provincial Park, Nipekamew Creek, and tributaries from the Cub Hills.

== Nipekamew Sand Cliffs ==
Along the course of river are the provincially protected Nipekamew Sand Cliffs. The sand cliffs are made up of layers of compacted sand, pebble, and clay that were deposited there 120 million years ago during the Early Cretaceous period. Erosion by the Nipekamew River exposed the cliffs. The cliffs can be accessed from a 1.5-kilometre (0.93 mi) hiking trail that starts off of Highway 165.

== See also ==
- List of rivers of Saskatchewan
- Hudson Bay drainage basin
