= Bow River (disambiguation) =

The Bow River is a tributary of the South Saskatchewan River in Alberta, Canada.

Bow River may also refer to:

== Rivers ==
- Bow River (New South Wales), a tributary of the Goulburn River, in New South Wales
- Bow River (Western Australia), a river in the Great Southern region of Western Australia
- Bow River (Kimberley region, Western Australia), a tributary of the Ord River, in the Kimberley region of northern Western Australia
- Bow River (Saskatchewan), a river in Saskatchewan, Canada

== Other ==
- Bow River (electoral district), a federal electoral district in Alberta, Canada
- "Bow River", a song by Cold Chisel about the Kimberley river from their 1982 album Circus Animals
