= Clarence Lake =

Lake in Saskatchewan, Canada

- Location in Saskatchewan Clarence Lake (Canada)
- Location: Clarence-Steepbank Lakes Provincial Park, Saskatchewan
- Coordinates: 54.2334°N 105.0004°W
- Part of: Churchill River drainage basin
- Primary outflows: Bow River
- Basin countries: Canada
- Surface area: 158 ha (390 acres)
- Max. depth: 27.2 m (89 ft)
- Shore length^{1}: 9.8 km (6.1 mi)
- Surface elevation: 540 m (1,770 ft)
- ^{1} Shore length is not a well-defined measure.

Clarence Lake is a lake in Clarence-Steepbank Lakes Provincial Park in the Canadian province of Saskatchewan. The lake is in a glacier-carved valley in the Boreal forest ecozone of Canada and is part of the Bow River chain of lakes at the headwaters of the Bow River, which is a tributary of Lac la Ronge in the Churchill River watershed.

Clarence Lake is the easiest lake in the park to access as it's only about 500 metres (1,600 ft) from Highway 927 and, with five campsites at its northern end, it's the only lake in the park with vehicle accessible camping. Northern pike, walleye, and lake trout are fish commonly found in the lake. The road that gives access to Clarence Lake from the highway also gives access to other lakes in the Bow River chain, including Hayes, Kit, Jasper, Ridge, and Steepbank Lakes.

== See also ==
- List of lakes of Saskatchewan
- Tourism in Saskatchewan
