= Nipekamew Lake =

Lake in Saskatchewan, Canada

- Location in Saskatchewan Nipekamew Lake (Canada)
- Location: Northern Administration District, Saskatchewan
- Coordinates: 54.3941°N 104.9632°W
- Part of: Churchill River drainage basin
- Primary inflows: East Trout Lake, Nipekamew Creek
- Primary outflows: Nipekamew River
- Basin countries: Canada
- Surface area: 1,462.9 ha (3,615 acres)
- Max. depth: 32.2 m (106 ft)
- Shore length^{1}: 66.9 km (41.6 mi)
- Surface elevation: 500 m (1,600 ft)
- ^{1} Shore length is not a well-defined measure.

Nipekamew Lake is a lake in the Canadian province of Saskatchewan. The lake is north-east of Clarence-Steepbank Lakes Provincial Park and north-west of Narrow Hills Provincial Park and the Cub Hills. It is a long and narrow lake that runs in a north to south direction and is surrounded by boreal forest, rolling hills, and muskeg. The outflow, Nipekamew River, is at the northern end of the lake and at the southern end of the lake, neighbouring East Trout Lake flows directly into it through a short channel. Several other smaller rivers, such as Nipekamew Creek, also flow into the lake. The lake is part of the Churchill River watershed, which flows into the Hudson Bay.

Nipekamew Lake is in the Northern Saskatchewan Administration District and is accessed from Highway 912 and Highway 927. Highway 912 runs up along the eastern shore and Highway 927 goes to the southern end of the lake and heads west to East Trout Lake and services the resorts in the area.

== East Trout-Nipekamew Lakes Recreation Site ==
East Trout-Nipekamew Lakes Recreation Site is a provincial recreation site at the southern end of Nipekamew Lake and along the south-eastern shore of East Trout Lake. There are three resorts in the park centred on the bay and channel that separate the two lakes. Highway 927 provides access to the park and the resorts.

On the East Trout Lake part of the park is Pine Grove Resort. It has cabin rentals and a campground for accommodations. There is also a convenience store, boat rentals, boat launch, public showers, and washrooms.

Eagle Bay Resort is situated on the bay between the lakes. Like Pine Grove Resort, it also has cabins for rent and a campground. Eagle Bay Resort has a general store, fuel, a boat launch, restaurant, a large sandy beach, and a water trampoline.

Katche Kamp Outfitters is on the same bay as Eagle Bay Resort and also has cabins for rent. It offers many of the same amenities as the other resorts, such as boat rentals, boat launch, store, laundry, showers, etc.

== Fish species ==
Fish species in Nipekamew Lake include northern pike, walleye, lake trout, and yellow perch.

== See also ==
- List of lakes of Saskatchewan
- Tourism in Saskatchewan
