= Bow River (Saskatchewan) =

River in Saskatchewan, Canada

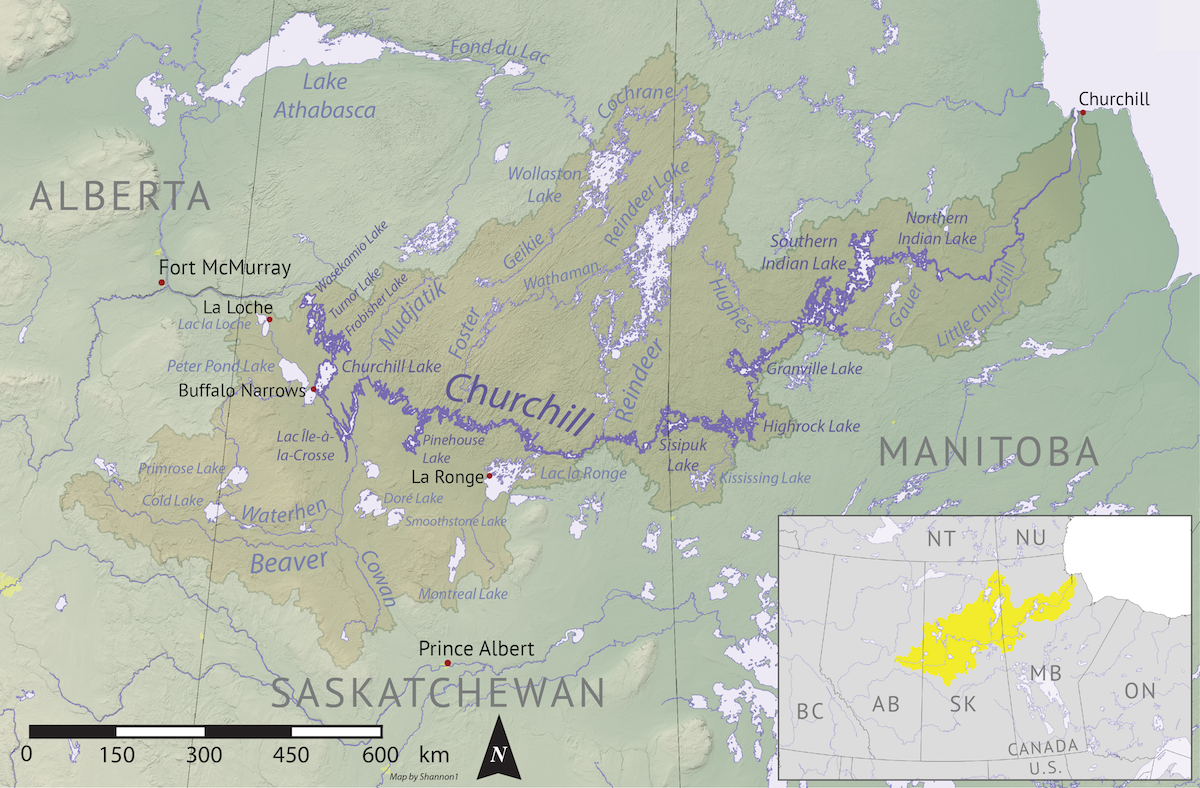
- Churchill River drainage basin

- Location of the mouth in Saskatchewan Bow River (Saskatchewan) (Canada)

Location
- Country: Canada
- Province: Saskatchewan

Physical characteristics
- Source: Bow River chain lakes
  - location: Clarence-Steepbank Lakes Provincial Park
  - coordinates: 54.2575°N 105.0513°W
  - elevation: 540 m (1,770 ft)
- Mouth
  - location: Lac la Ronge
  - coordinates: 54.9274°N 105.2134°W
  - elevation: 360 m (1,180 ft)

Basin features
- River system: Churchill River drainage basin

Bow River is a river in the Northern Administration District of the Canadian province of Saskatchewan. The river begins at Ridge Lake of Bow River chain lakes in Clarence-Steepbank Lakes Provincial Park and flows in a northerly direction into Lac la Ronge and Lac La Ronge Provincial Park. Rapid River connects Lac la Ronge to the Churchill River. There are no communities nor settlements along the river's course.

== Bow River chain lakes ==
The Bow River chain lakes are a series of eight lakes in glacier-carved valleys that make up the headwaters of the Bow River. O'Conner Lake (54.2191°N 104.9341°W) is the farthest upstream as it is east of Clarence-Steepbank Lakes Provincial Park and west of the Cub Hills and Narrow Hills Provincial Park. At the west end of O'Conner Lake, a short stream flows out in a westerly direction, passing under Highway 927, and into Clarence-Steepbank Lakes Provincial Park and then Hayes Lake (54.2361°N 104.9926°W). Hayes Lake connects to Clarence Lake (54.2334°N 105.0004°W), which then flows downstream into Kit (54.2575°N 105.0185°W), Jasper (54.2599°N 105.0328°W), and Ridge Lakes (54.2571°N 105.0463°W). The Bow River itself begins at the west end of Ridge Lake and flows west where it is met by a short stream that flows from Steepbank (54.2664°N 105.1096°W) and Birch Lakes (54.2845°N 105.1726°W).

== River's course ==
From the chain lakes, Bow River turns northward following a glacier-carved valley through boreal forest and muskeg en route to Lac la Ronge. It is flanked on the east by Meeyomoot River and on the west by Highway Creek and Montreal River. About halfway along the river's course, it widens out forming a small lake called Parr Lake. Beyond Parr Lake, the river narrows again and then nears Highway 969 and runs parallel to it in a north-easterly direction until it crosses Highway 165. From Highway 165, the terrain begins to flatten out and the river empties into Lac la Ronge at Mosquito Point, just south of Potato River Indian Reserve.

== See also ==
- List of rivers of Saskatchewan
- Hudson Bay drainage basin
- Tourism in Saskatchewan
