= La Saline Natural Area =

Nature preserve in Canada

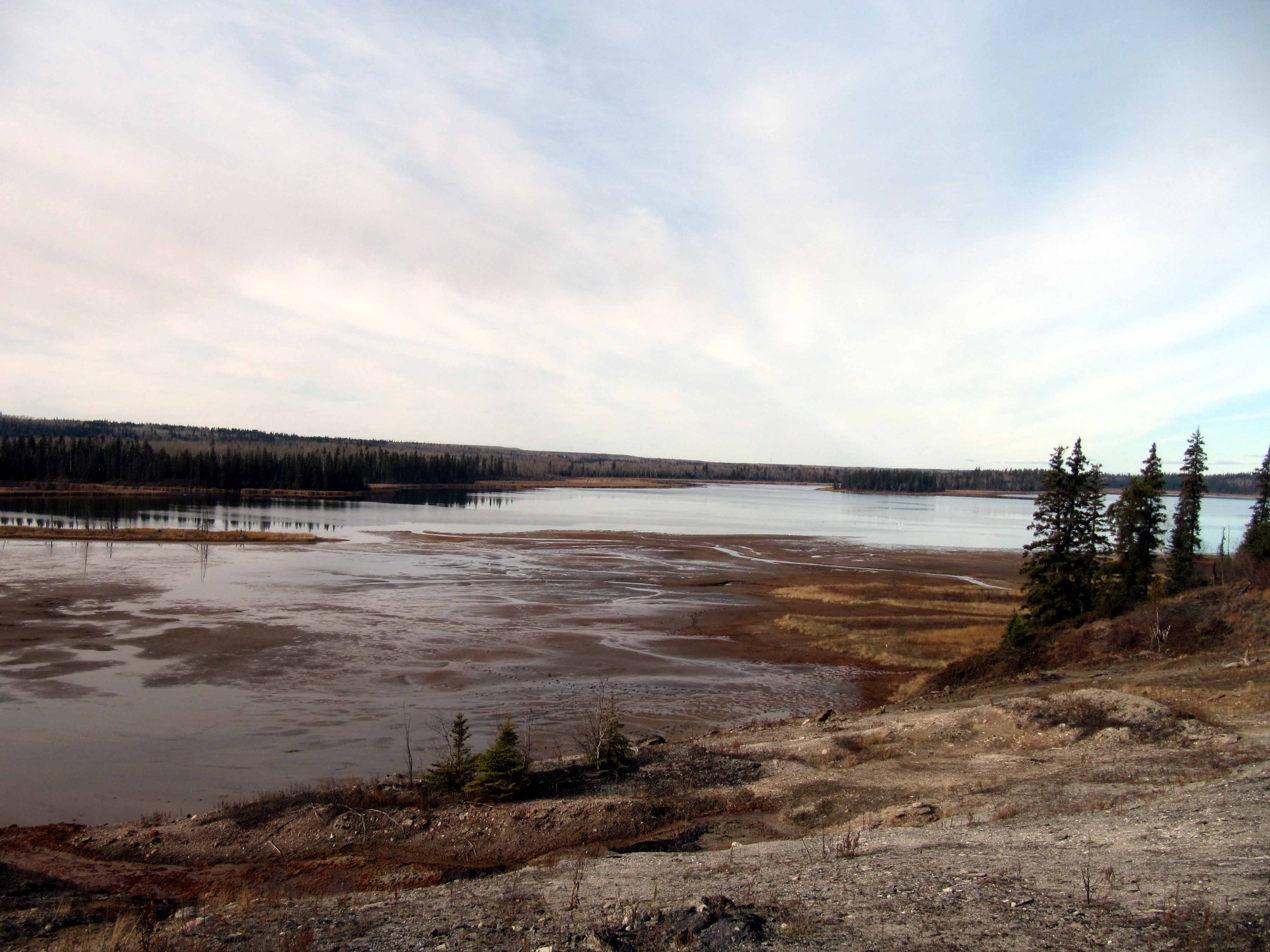
- Saline Lake and salt marshes at La Saline Natural Area, seen from the edge of the tufa mound on the southeastern shore

- Location within Alberta
- Location: Wood Buffalo, Alberta, Canada
- Nearest city: Fort McMurray
- Coordinates: 57°04′51″N 111°31′24″W
- Area: 331.0 ha (818 acres)
- Governing body: Alberta Tourism, Parks and Recreation

La Saline Natural Area in the boreal forest of northeastern Alberta, Canada, preserves Saline Lake, a saline oxbow lake adjacent to the Athabasca River north of Fort McMurray. The lake is an important stop for waterfowl and other birds that migrate along the Athabasca River. Large deposits of tufa have accumulated around the salt springs on the lake's southeastern shore.

== Natural setting ==
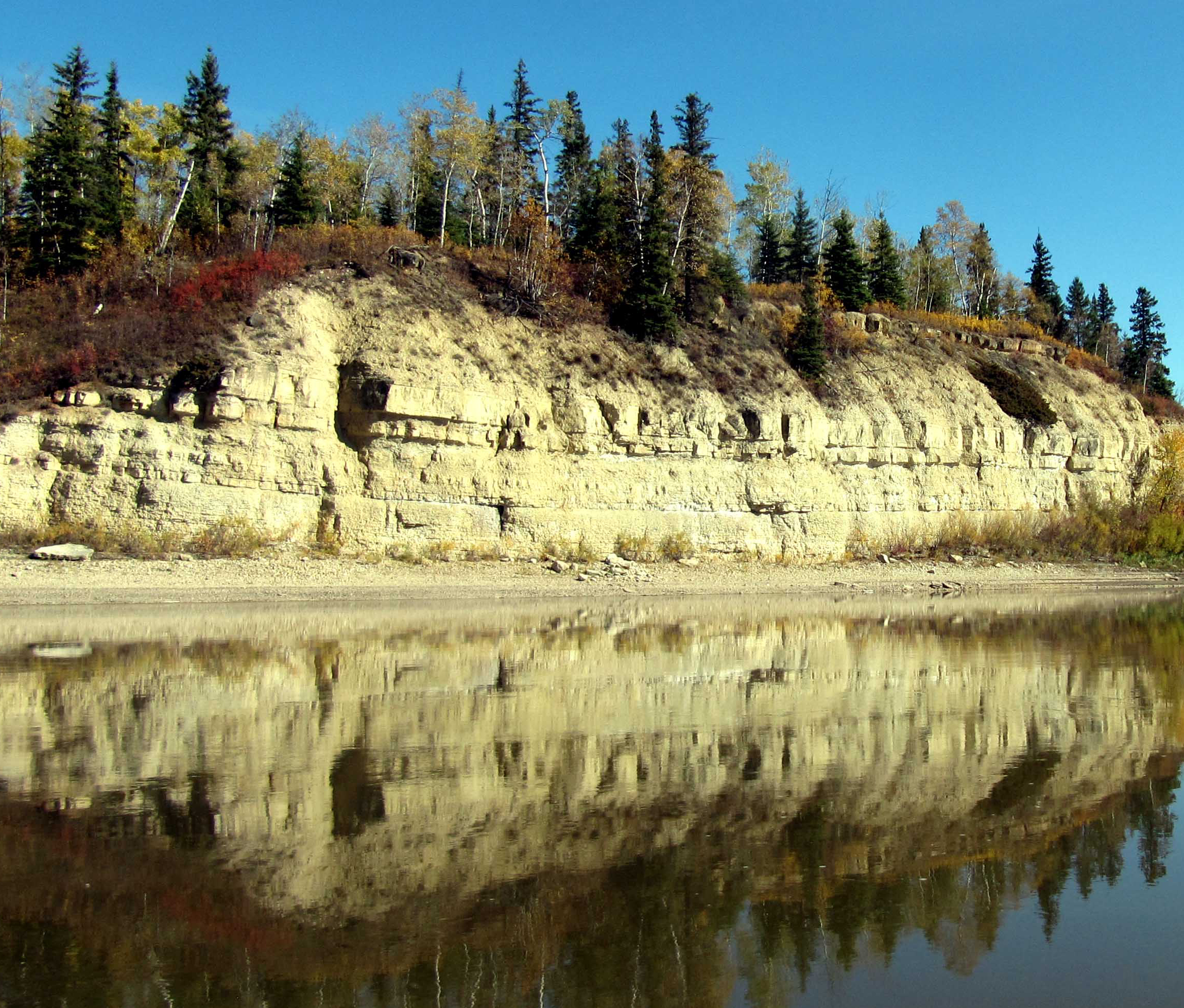
An outcrop of fossiliferous Waterways Formation limestone on the west side of La Saline Natural Area.

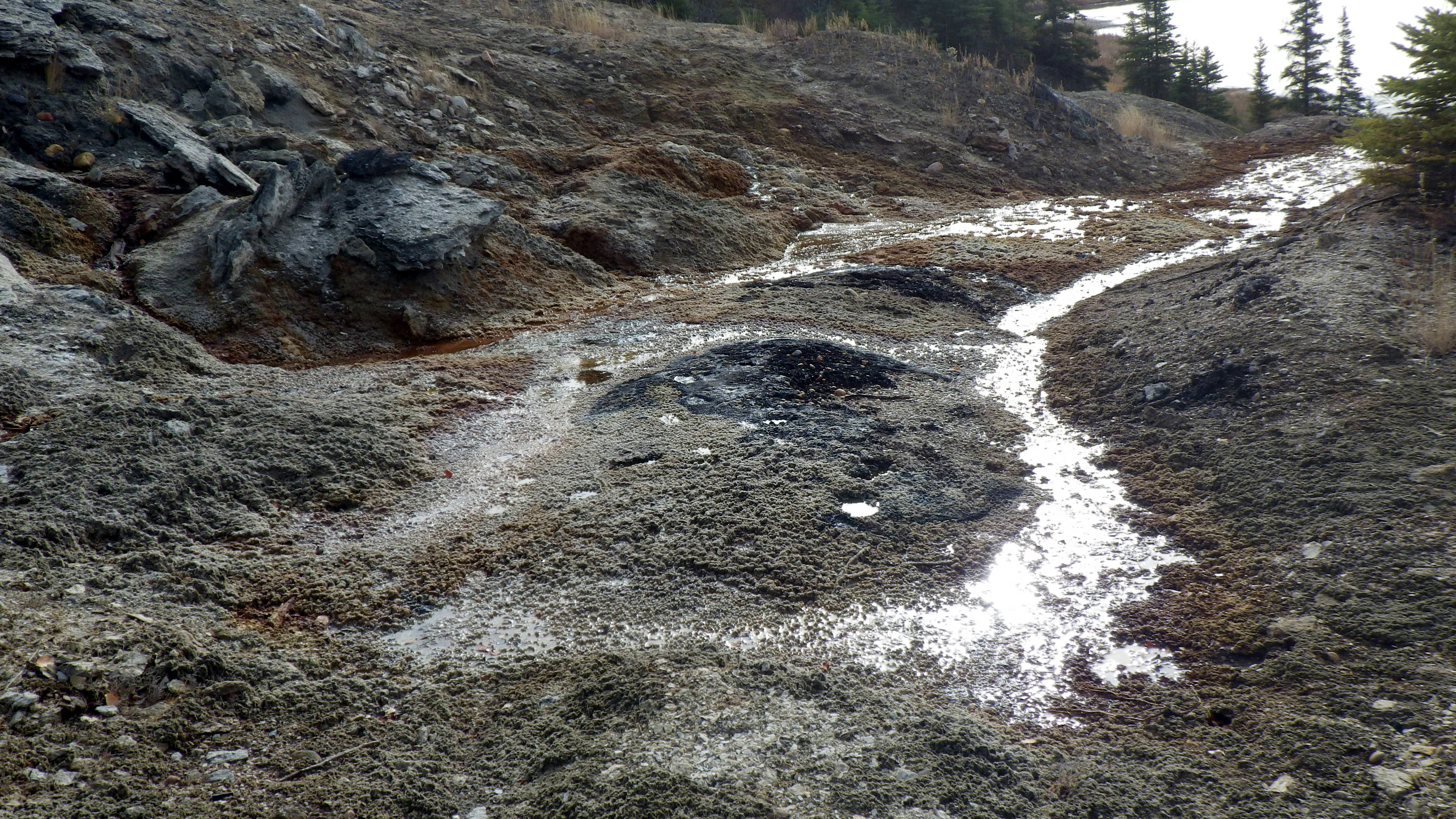
A salt spring on the tufa mound, with hoof-prints of animals that came to obtain minerals.

Saline Lake is the region's most productive lake for waterfowl, and birdwatching is the main recreational activity at La Saline Natural Area. Thousands of ducks, geese and other birds migrate along the Athabasca River to nesting sites on the Peace-Athabasca Delta, and Saline Lake is an important resting and feeding spot for them. Some, including American coots, mallards, American wigeons, buffleheads, and green-winged teal, nest on Saline Lake. The lake is also important to migrating shore birds that feed on the Daphnia and other small invertebrates that are abundant in its saline waters during summer. Mineral licks created by the salt springs attract moose, deer, and other animals to the lake.

La Saline Natural Area lies within the Boreal Forest – Central Mixedwood Region of northeastern Alberta. Rare hypersaline vegetation types are found on the tufa mound, and rare brackish and saline plant communities grow in the salt marshes along the lake shore.

== Geologic setting ==
La Saline Natural Area lies in the heart of the Athabasca Oil Sands region. The spring water at La Saline originates primarily from the Devonian strata that underlie the region, including the carbonate rocks of the Keg River and Waterways Formations, and the halite (rock salt) deposits of the Prairie Evaporite Formation. As the water travels through those formations it becomes enriched in dissolved carbonate and evaporite minerals. The spring water at La Saline has a reported total dissolved solids content of 71,400 milligrams per litre (0.00258 lb/cu in) and it comes to the surface because it has reached an aquitard formed by the bitumen-saturated sands at the base of the overlying Early Cretaceous McMurray Formation. As carbon dioxide and small amounts of hydrogen sulfide gas are released to the atmosphere, some of the dissolved minerals precipitate, forming the tufa. Analysis of the tufa has shown that it includes calcite, dolomite, quartz, gypsum, anhydrite, barite, and elemental sulfur. Tufa deposits, including a large mound measuring 3 m (9.8 ft) in width, have accumulated around the salt springs on the lake's southeastern shore.

Outcrops of the Devonian limestones of the Waterways Formation (Moberly Member) are present along the Athabasca River on the western edge of the Natural Area. They include fossil brachiopods, gastropods, stromatoporoids, and crinoid remains.

== Access ==
There are no roads or developed trails to La Saline Natural Area. The best access is from the Athabasca River.
