= Clarence-Steepbank Lakes Provincial Park =

Provincial park in Saskatchewan, Canada

- IUCN category Ib (wilderness area)
- Location within Saskatchewan Location within Canada
- Location: Northern Administration District, Saskatchewan
- Nearest city: Prince Albert
- Coordinates: 54.2471°N 104.9951°W
- Area: 17,550 ha (43,400 acres)
- Established: 1994
- Governing body: Sask Parks

Clarence-Steepbank Lakes Provincial Park is a remote wilderness provinical park in the Canadian province of Saskatchewan. It is located in the boreal forest ecozone east of Prince Albert National Park and Montreal Lake, west of the Cub Hills and Narrow Hills Provincial Park, south of Nipekamew and East Trout Lakes, and north of Whiteswan Lakes and Candle Lake Provincial Park. The city of Prince Albert is approximately 150 kilometres (93 mi) to the south and access to the park is from Highway 927.<

== Recreation ==
Clarence-Steepbank Lakes is a "pack-in, pack-out" provincial park with minimal services, few marked trails, and over-grown roads. The only camping with vehicle access is a five-campsite campground at the north end of Clarence Lake. There are also two primitive campsites at the east end of Steepbank Lake. The landscape of the park is that of old-growth boreal forests, rolling hills, muskeg, and glacier carved valleys and lakes. There are eight main lakes in the park, with the two largest and most notable being Clarence Lake and Steepbank Lake, which are the namesake of the park and part of a chain of lakes called Bow River chain that make up the headwaters of the Bow River. The Bow River flows north through glacier formed valleys, muskeg, old growth boreal forest, and the heart of the park en route to Lac la Ronge. Other lakes in the chain include Hayes Lake (which is upstream, east of, and runs parallel to Clarence Lake), Kit Lake, Jasper Lake, and Ridge Lake. Kit Lake has a picnic area and a boat launch.

Fishing among the many lakes is one of the popular activities in the park. Fish commonly found in the various lakes include northern pike, perch, walleye, and rainbow and brook trout. Rustic camping, hiking, ATVing, and, in the winter, snowmobiling are other activities common in the park.

== Flora and fauna ==
The park is in old growth forest boreal forest and as such, animals and plants common to boreal forests are found in the park. Some of the animals include woodland caribou, black bears, red squirrels, wolves, and beavers. Birds found in the park include the black-throated green warbler, western tanager, purple finch, evening grosbeak, bald eagle, goshawk, barred owl, and pileated woodpecker.

Trees native to the forests of Clarence-Steepbank Lakes Provincial Park include aspen, jack pine, and spruce.

== See also ==
- List of protected areas of Saskatchewan
- Tourism in Saskatchewan
