= East Trout Lake =

Lake in Saskatchewan, Canada

- Location in Saskatchewan East Trout Lake (Canada)
- Location: Northern Administration District, Saskatchewan
- Coordinates: 54.3667°N 105.0837°W
- Part of: Churchill River drainage basin
- Primary outflows: Nipekamew Lake
- Basin countries: Canada
- Surface area: 2,494.2 ha (6,163 acres)
- Max. depth: 49.99 m (164.0 ft)
- Shore length^{1}: 105.8 km (65.7 mi)
- Surface elevation: 500 m (1,600 ft)
- ^{1} Shore length is not a well-defined measure.

East Trout Lake is a lake in the Canadian province of Saskatchewan. The lake is directly north of Clarence-Steepbank Lakes Provincial Park in Saskatchewan's Northern Administration District. It is a long and narrow lake that runs in an east–west direction and is surrounded by boreal forest, rolling hills, and muskeg. Several streams flow into the lake and its outflow is at the eastern end where it flows directly into neighbouring Nipekamew Lake through a short channel and bay. The lake is part of the Churchill River watershed, which flows into the Hudson Bay. East Trout Lake is accessed from Highway 927 at the south-east corner of the lake.

From 26-28 May 2025, the Shoe Fire swept through the region. It destroyed most of the community at the lake, including the wooden bridge used to access the townsite.

== East Trout–Nipekamew Lakes Recreation Site ==
East Trout–Nipekamew Lakes Recreation Site (54.3566°N 104.9771°W) is a provincial recreation park that was established in 1984 along the south-eastern shore of East Trout Lake and south-west corner of Nipekamew Lake. There are three resorts in the park centred on the bay and channel that separate the two lakes. Highway 927 provides access to the park and the resorts.

On the East Trout Lake part of the park is Pine Grove Resort. It features cabin rentals and a campground for accommodations. There is also a convenience store, boat rentals, boat launch, public showers, and washrooms.

Eagle Bay Resort is situated on the bay between the lakes. Like Pine Gove Resort, it also has cabins for rent and a campground. Eagle Bay Resort has a general store, fuel, a boat launch, restaurant, a large sandy beach, and a water trampoline.

Katche Kamp Outfitters is on the same bay as Eagle Bay Resort and also has cabins for rent. It offers many of the same amenities as the other resorts, such as boat rentals, boat launch, store, laundry, showers, etc. The outfitters also offers fishing guides.

== Fish species ==
Fish species commonly found in East Trout Lake include northern pike, walleye, lake trout, and yellow perch.

== See also ==
- List of lakes of Saskatchewan
- Tourism in Saskatchewan
