= Saskatchewan Highway 927 =

Provincial highway in Saskatchewan, Canada

Highway 927

Route information
- Maintained by Ministry of Highways and Infrastructure
- Length: 24 km (15 mi)

Major junctions
- South end: Highway 912 near Narrow Hills Provincial Park
- North end: East Trout–Nipekamew Lakes Recreation Site

Location
- Country: Canada
- Province: Saskatchewan

Highway system
- Provincial highways in Saskatchewan
| ← Highway 926 | → Highway 928 |

Highway 927 is a provincial highway in the north-east region of the Canadian province of Saskatchewan. It runs from Highway 912 to East Trout–Nipekamew Lakes Recreation Site. The Highway makes up part of the eastern border of, and provides access to, Clarence-Steepbank Lakes Provincial Park. It is about 24 kilometres (15 mi) long.

In 2025, the bridge carrying Highway 927 across a river near Clarence Lake was replaced at a cost of $600,000. The bridge was destroyed during the 2025 wildfire season in Saskatchewan.

== See also ==
- Roads in Saskatchewan
- Transportation in Saskatchewan
