= Boreal forest of Canada =

Biome characterized by coniferous forests

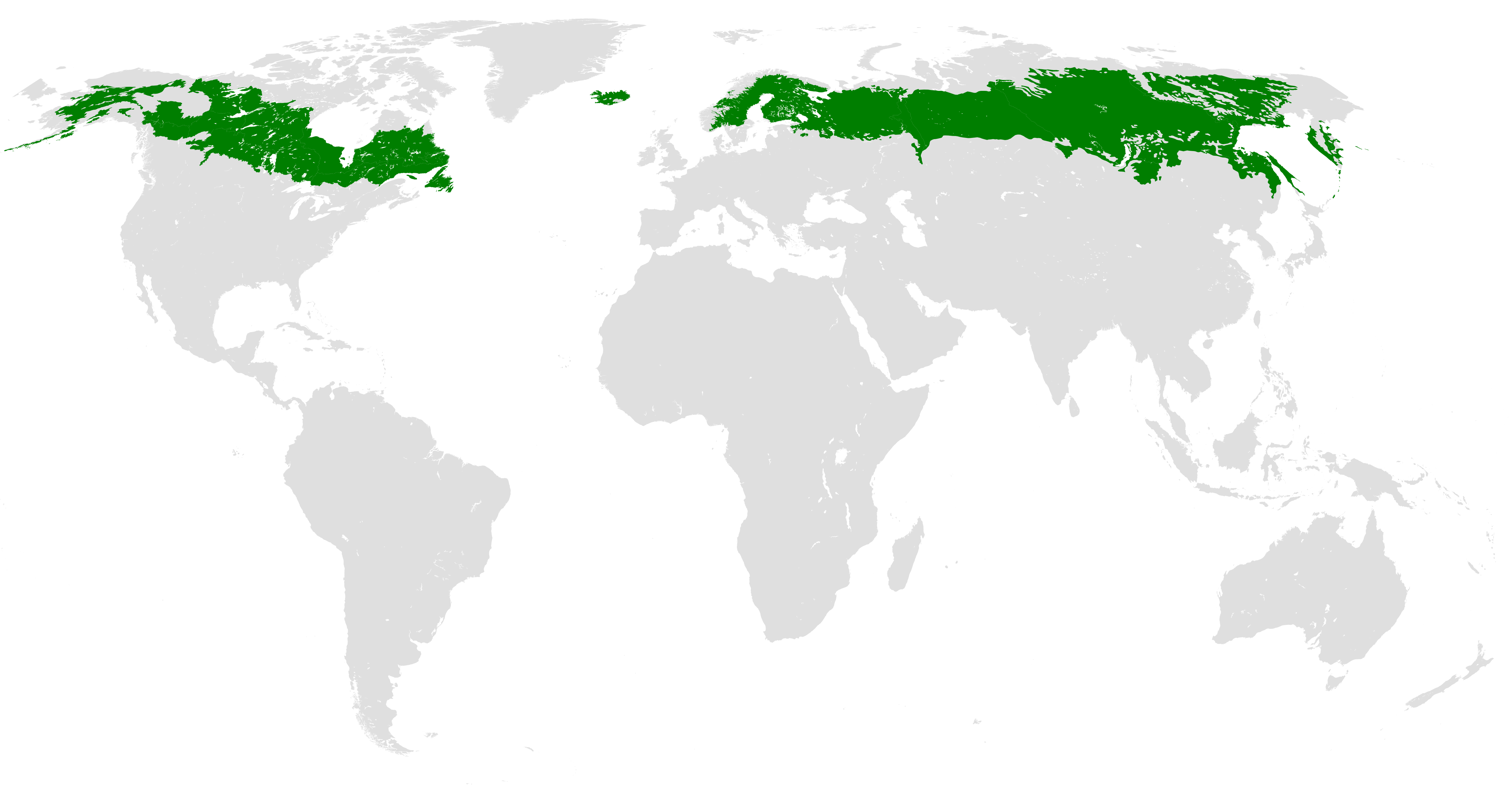
Boreal forests occur in the more southern parts of the taiga ecoregion that spreads across the northern parts of the world.

Canada's boreal forest is a vast region comprising about one third of the circumpolar boreal forest that rings the Northern Hemisphere, mostly north of the 50th parallel. Other countries with boreal forest include Russia, which contains the majority; the United States in its northernmost state of Alaska; and the Scandinavian or Northern European countries (e.g. Sweden, Finland, Norway and small regions of Scotland). In Europe, the entire boreal forest is referred to as taiga, not just the northern fringe where it thins out near the tree line. The boreal region in Canada covers almost 60% of the country's land area. The Canadian boreal region spans the landscape from the most easterly part of the province of Newfoundland and Labrador to the border between the far northern Yukon and Alaska. The area is dominated by coniferous forests, particularly spruce, interspersed with vast wetlands, mostly bogs and fens. The boreal region of Canada includes eight ecozones. While the biodiversity of regions varies, each ecozone has characteristic native flora and fauna.

The boreal forest zone consists of closed-crown conifer forests with a conspicuous deciduous element (Ritchie 1987). The proportions of the dominant conifers (white and black spruces, jack pine (Pinus banksiana Lamb.), tamarack, and balsam fir) vary greatly in response to interactions among climate, topography, soil, fire, pests, and perhaps other factors.

The boreal region contains about 13% of Canada's population. With its sheer vastness and forest cover, the boreal makes an important contribution to the rural and aboriginal economies of Canada, primarily through resource industries, recreation, hunting, fishing and eco-tourism. Hundreds of cities and towns within its territory derive at least 20% of their economic activity from the forest, mainly from industries like forest products, mining, oil and gas and tourism. The boreal forest also plays an iconic role in Canada's history, economic and social development and the arts.

== Overview ==
=== Location and size ===
The Canadian boreal forest is a very large bio-region that extends in length from the Yukon-Alaska border right across the country to Newfoundland and Labrador. It is over 1,000 kilometres (620 mi) in width (north to south) separating the arctic tundra region from the various landscapes of southern Canada. The taiga growth (as defined in North America) along the northern flank of the boreal forest creates a transition to the tundra region at the northern tree line. On the southwestern flank, the boreal forest extends into sub-alpine and lower elevation areas of northern British Columbia. The central interior of the province is occupied by a sub-boreal transition zone between the main boreal forest and the dry forests of the southern interior. However, across the Prairie Provinces, a band of aspen parkland marks a different kind of transition along the south-central flank from boreal forest to grassland. In Central Canada, the southeastern flank is marked by the Eastern forest-boreal transition of Central Ontario and western Quebec. It consists mainly of mixed coniferous and broad-leaf woodlands. South of this transition can be found the deciduous woodlands of Southern Ontario.

Canada's boreal forest is considered to be the largest intact forest on Earth, with around three million square kilometres still undisturbed by roads, cities and industrial development. Its high level of intactness has made the forest a particular focus of environmentalists and conservation scientists who view the untouched regions of the forest as an opportunity for large-scale conservation that would otherwise be impractical in other parts of the world.

=== General forest ecology ===
The Canadian boreal forest in its current form began to emerge with the end of the last Ice Age. With the retreat of the Wisconsin Ice Sheet 10,000 years ago, spruce and northern pine migrated northward and were followed thousands of years later by fir and birch. About 5,000 years ago, the Canadian boreal began to resemble what it is today in terms of species composition and biodiversity. This type of coniferous forest vegetation is spread across the Northern Hemisphere. These forests contain three structural types: forest tundra in the north, open lichen woodland further south, and closed forest in more southern areas. White spruce, black spruce and tamarack are most prevalent in the four northern eco-zones of the Taiga and Hudson Plains, while spruce, balsam fir, jack pine, white birch and trembling aspen are most common in the lower boreal regions. Large populations of trembling aspen and willow are found in the southernmost parts of the Boreal Plains.

One dominant characteristic of the boreal is that much of it consists of large, even-aged stands, a uniformity that owes to a cycle of natural disturbances like forest fires, or outbreaks of pine beetle or spruce budworm that kill large tracts of forest with cyclical regularity and alter nutrient availability in soils and waterways. For example, the many stands of white spruce, black spruce, and balsam fir are vulnerable to the cyclical outbreaks of a species of the spruce budworm, the Choristoneura fumiferana. Since the melting of the great ice sheet, the boreal forest has been through many cycles of natural death through fire, insect outbreaks, and disease, followed by regeneration. Prior to European colonization of Canada and the application of modern firefighting equipment and techniques, the natural burn/regeneration cycle was less than 75 to 100 years, and it still is in many areas.

Terms like old growth and ancient forest have a different connotation in the boreal context than they do when used to describe mature coastal rain forests with longer-lived species and different natural disturbance cycles. However, the effects of forest fires and insect outbreaks differ from the effects of logging, so they should not be treated as equivalent in their ecological consequences. Logging, for example, requires road networks with their negative impacts, and it removes nutrients from the site, which may deplete nutrients for the next cycle of forest growth. Fire, on the other hand, recycles nutrients on location (except for some nitrogen), it removes accumulated organic matter and it stimulates reproduction of fire-dependent species.

=== Ecosystems ===
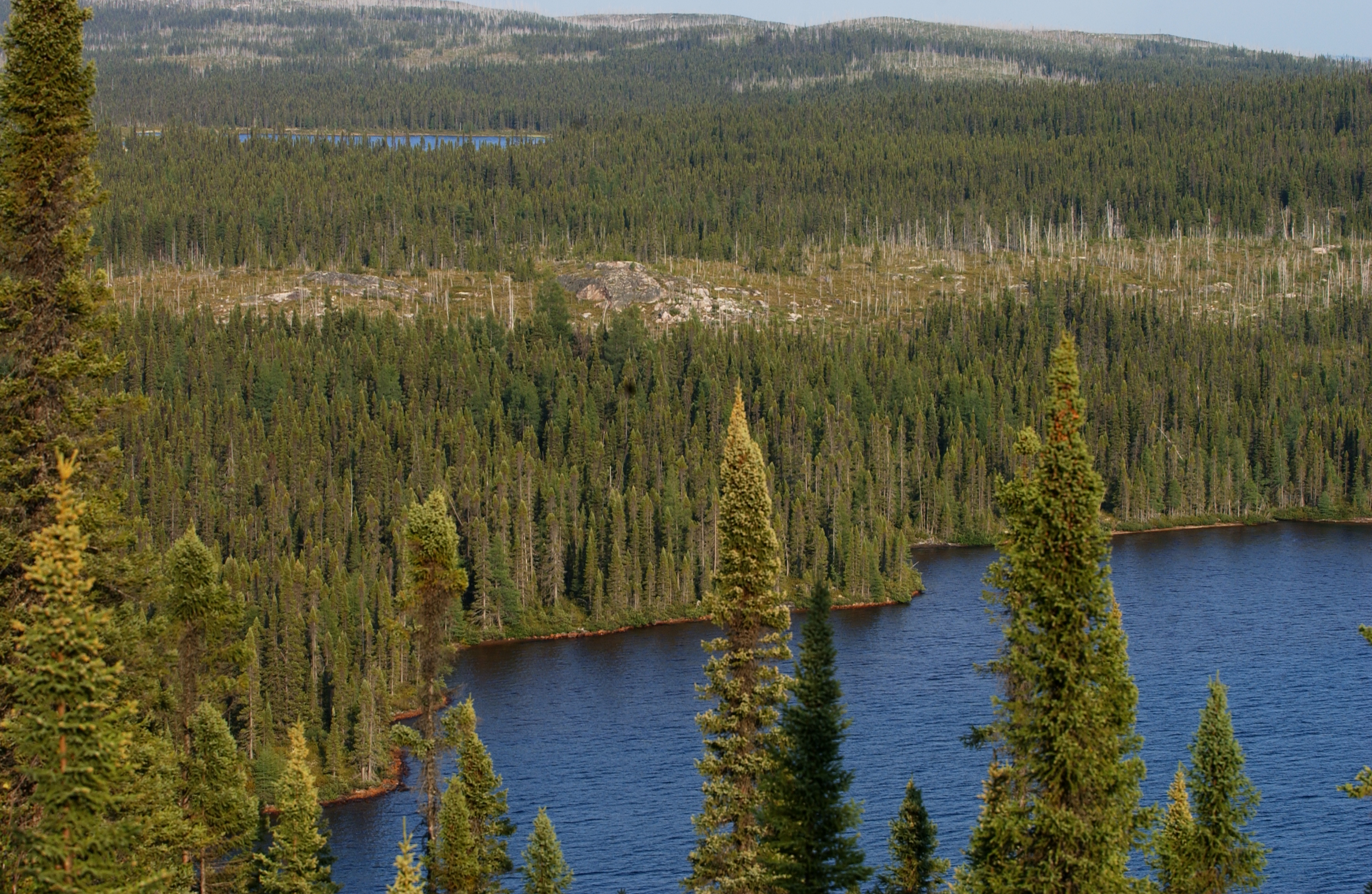
Typical upland taiga in Quebec

Canada's boreal region can be divided into seven ecozones. These seven can be divided into two main groups. The northern regions of the boreal forest consists of four eco-zones – Taiga Cordillera, Taiga Plains, Taiga Shield and Hudson Plains – that are the most thinly treed areas where the growing season and average tree size progressively shrinks until the edge of the Arctic tundra is reached. The southern tier of the boreal meanwhile consists of three other ecozones that form the largely uninterrupted or continuous forest in stretching as far south as Lake Superior (as the Central Canadian Shield forests ecoregion), the Bruce Peninsula (due to maritime cooling off Lake Huron) and the Manitoba-North Dakota border. The three southern zones comprise the Boreal Shield. At 1,630,000 square kilometres, it is the largest of the eight zones. Within the boreal region, there are about 1,890,000 square kilometres that are 80% to 100% forested and another 650,000 square kilometres with 60% to 80% forest cover.

=== Forest species ===
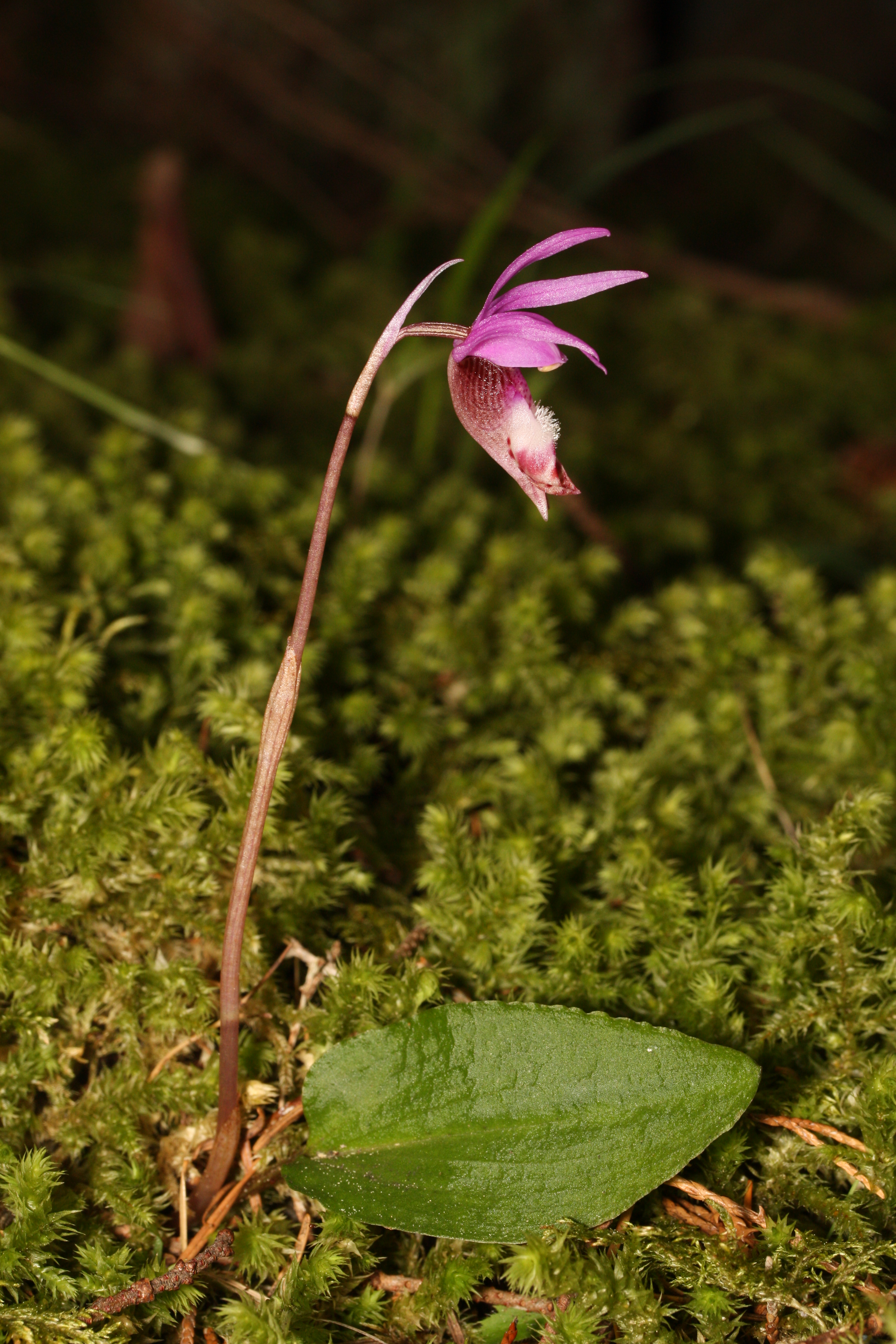
The Calypso orchid grows in the shade of boreal forests.

Most trees native to the Canadian boreal are conifers, with needle leaves and cones. These include: black spruce, white spruce, balsam fir, larch (tamarack), red pine, northern white cedar, lodgepole pine and jack pine. A few are broad-leaved species: trembling and large-toothed aspen, cottonwood, paper birch, white birch, and balsam poplar. There are large areas of black spruce, a species which is tolerant of shallow soil, permafrost and waterlogged substrates, although as a consequence they have relatively low biological productivity.

Owing to the short growing season, generally infertile soils, generally shallow soils, and frequent waterlogging, most of these forest types are slow-growing species, which generally tend to predominate in stressed habitats. Similarly, many of the understory shrubs are in the Ericaceae, a family known to tolerate acid, infertile and flooded habitats: examples include Labrador tea, sheep-laurel and blueberry. Since nutrient levels are so low, overall, the productivity of forest trees is highly dependent on the rate at which mineral elements such as nitrogen and phosphorus are recycled by litterfall and decomposition. After logging, the loss of nutrients may convert forested areas into shrub barrens dominated by shrubs such as sheep-laurel. Many of the plant species are fire-dependent, since fire removes neighbouring plants, and recycles nutrients locked in organic matter.

Although there are rather few species of trees in the boreal forest, there is a considerable diversity of other kinds of plants. An accurate summary is difficult, since most compendia on plants are organized by political, rather than ecological boundaries; one exception addresses the flora of the Hudson Bay Lowland, but much of this area is not forested. One portion of the boreal forest can be used to illustrate plant diversity; consider the Flora of the Yukon. In this western part of the boreal forest, there are, for example 127 species of grass (Poaceae), 118 species of Asteraceae, 115 species of sedge (Cyperaceae), 93 species of crucifer (Brassicaceae), 52 species of Rosaceae, 37 species of Saxifragaceae and 36 members of the snapdragon family (Scrophulariaceae). Overall, the flora has 1112 species – there are even 15 species of orchids.

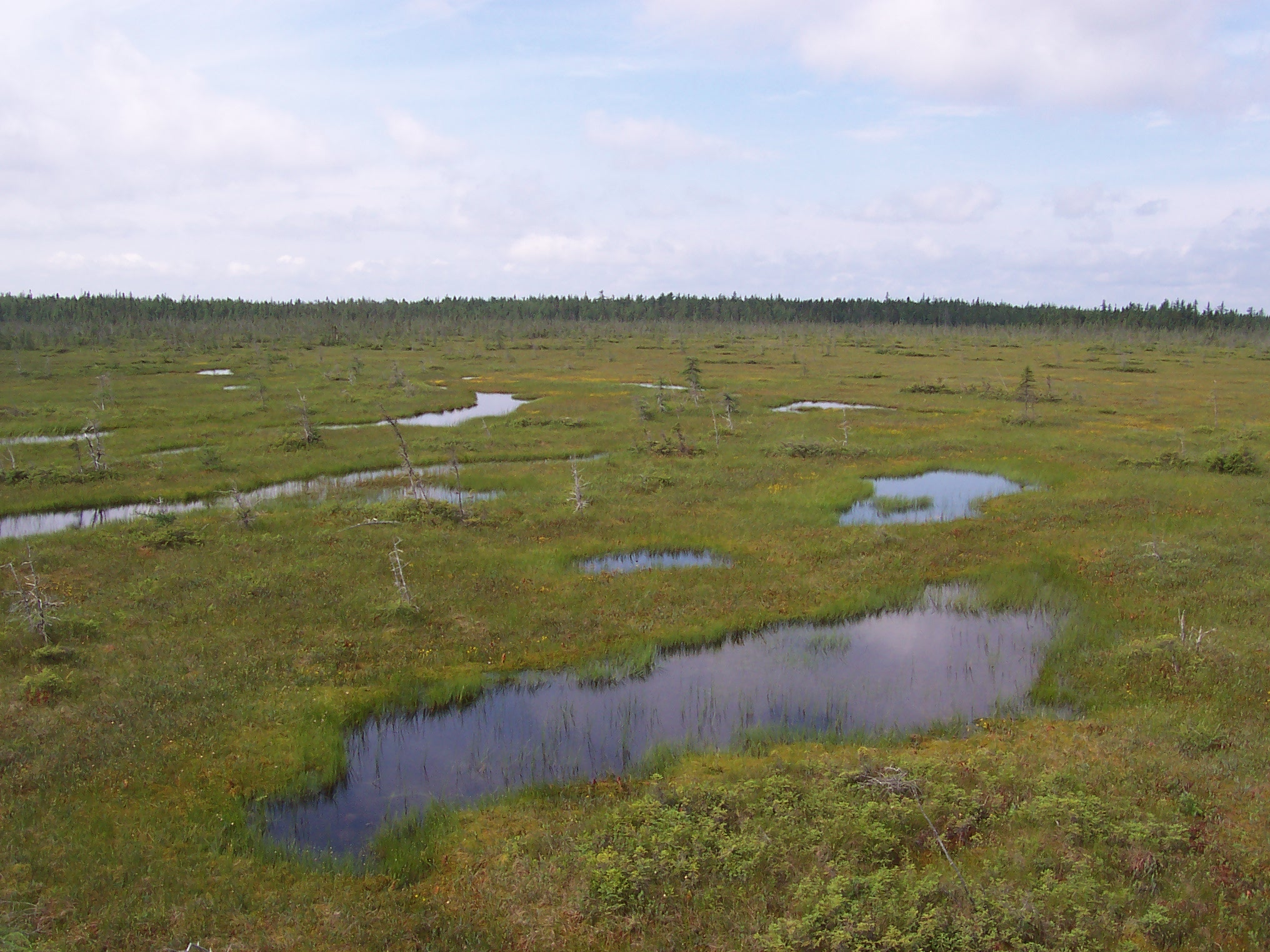
A Sphagnum bog with spruce trees on a forested ridge in Quebec.

=== Inland water and wetlands ===
Canada's boreal landscape contains more lakes and rivers than any comparably sized landmass on Earth. It has been estimated that the boreal region contains over 1.5 million lakes with a minimum surface area of 40,000 m^{2} (430,000 sq ft) as well as some of Canada's largest lakes. Soft water lakes predominate in central and eastern Canada and hard water lakes predominate in Western Canada. Most large boreal lakes have cold water species of fish like trout and whitefish, while in warmer waters, species may include northern pike, walleye, and smallmouth bass.

The boreal forest also has vast areas of wetland, particularly bogs and fens. Two wetland areas, the Hudson Bay Lowland and the Mackenzie River basin, are among the ten largest wetlands in the world. The boreal forest wetlands provide wildlife habitat (particularly for migratory birds), they maintain water flow in rivers, and they store significant amounts of carbon that otherwise would be released to the atmosphere.

=== Deforestation ===
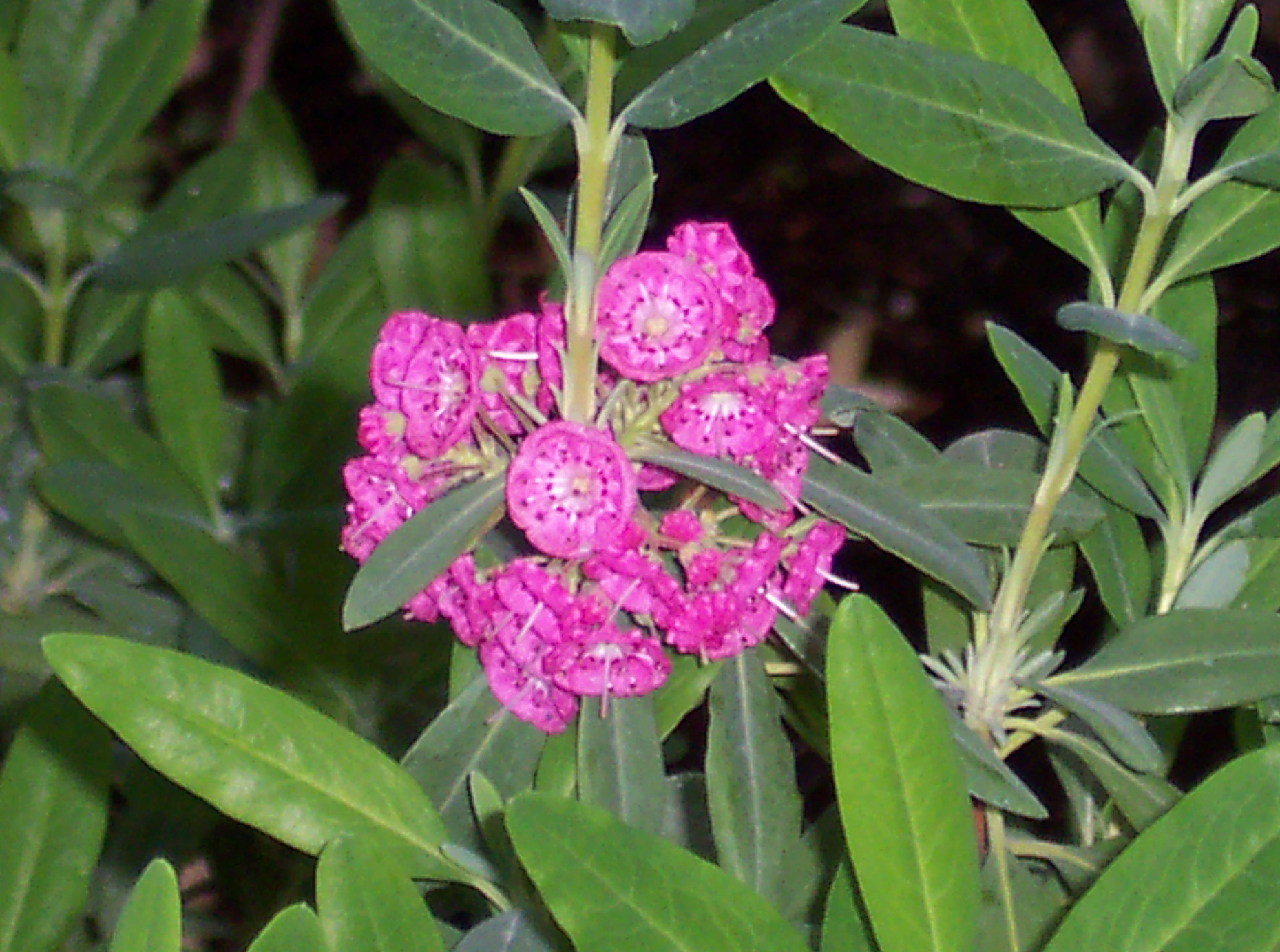
Sheep laurel grows in clearings and shallow soils. It can form extensive shrub barrens after logging.

In contemporary times, the boreal forest has suffered little deforestation, defined as the permanent conversion of forest area to non-forest due to activities associated with agriculture, urban or recreational development, oil and gas development, and flooding for hydroelectric projects. In Alberta, the province with the largest oil and gas industry, more trees are cut for agriculture or oil and gas exploration than for timber. In Eastern Canada, over 9,000 km^{2} (3,500 sq mi) of peatlands and forest have been flooded over the past four decades for hydroelectric projects. As of 2005, Canada as a whole has 91% of the boreal forest cover that existed at the dawn of European settlement. More deforestation has occurred outside the boreal region, in more southerly areas of the country.

The forest sector annually harvests approximately ½ of 1% of the region. However, this is not considered deforestation by some, given that provincial laws are meant to ensure that areas harvested by the forest sector are replanted or regenerated naturally. However, the resulting road network from logging has effects that persist long beyond the period of harvest; indeed, one can make the case that road construction is one of the most harmful and persistent effects of logging.

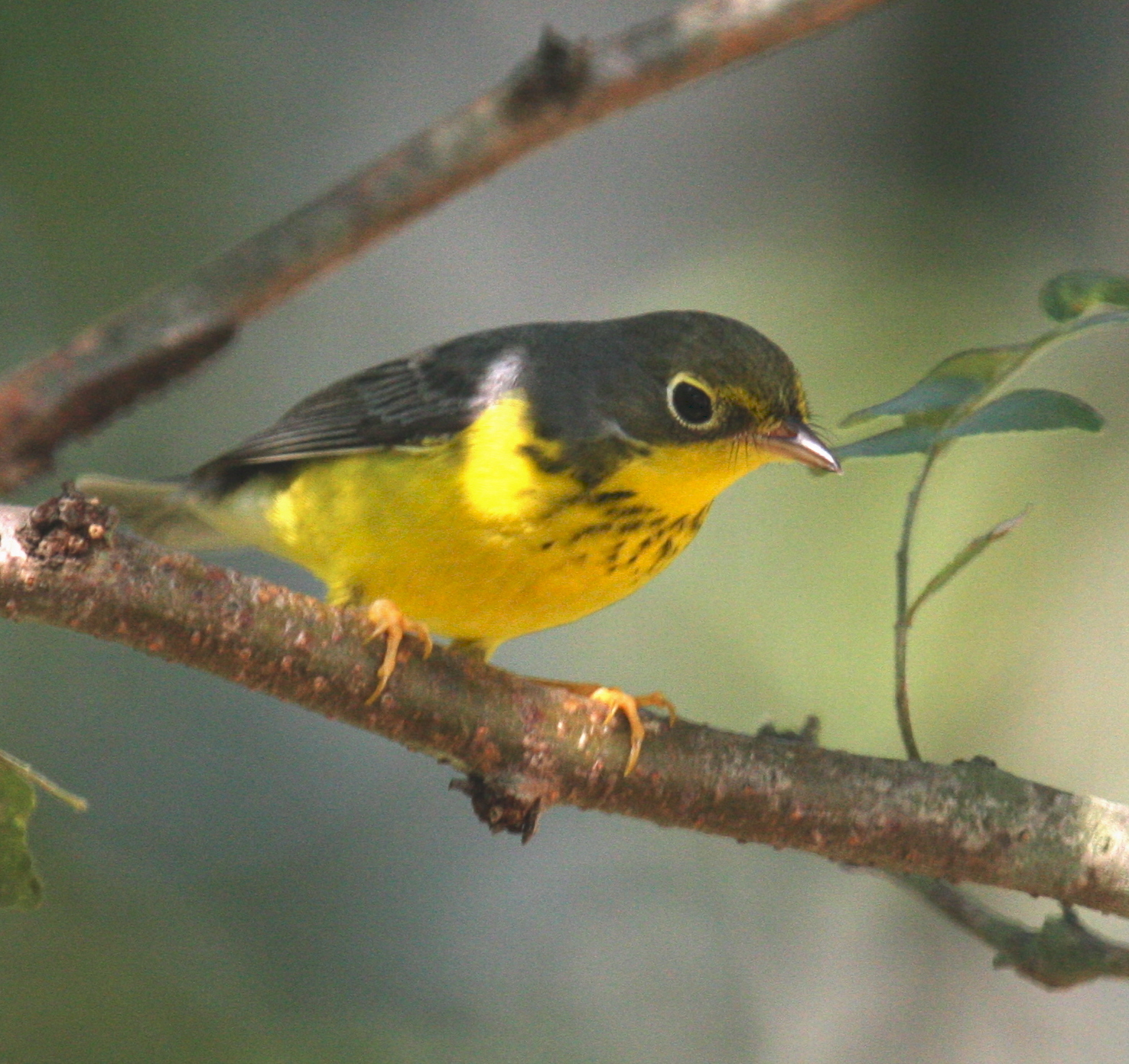
The Canada warbler nests on the ground in boreal forests.

=== Wildlife ===
There may be as many as five billion landbirds, including resident and migratory species. The Canadian boreal region contains the largest area of wetlands of any ecosystem of the world, serving as breeding ground for over 12 million waterbirds and millions of landbirds, the latter including species as diverse as vultures, hawks, grouse, owls, hummingbirds, kingfishers, woodpeckers, and passerines (or perching birds, often referred to as songbirds). It is estimated that the avian population of the boreal represents 60% of the landbirds in all of Canada and almost 30% of all landbirds in the United States and Canada combined.

Many of the wildlife species, are, like the forests, dependent upon natural disturbance from fire and insect outbreaks. For example, at least three species of warbler (Cape May warbler, bay-breasted warbler and Tennessee warbler), have distributions and abundance related to spruce budworm outbreaks. The black-backed woodpecker shows a preference for burnt over forests, where it forages for insects burrowing in the dead trees that remain standing. Fireweed, as the name suggests, is a plant that similar thrives in recently burned areas. Blueberries and huckleberries are also stimulated by fires, probably benefiting from the removal of shade, and the nutrients released in ashes. The resulting berries are an important food source for boreal forest animals.

Few species of boreal wildlife are classified under government conservation regimes as being at risk of extinction. However, the decline of some major species of wildlife is a concern. Boreal woodland caribou, whose lichen-rich, mature forest habitat spans the boreal forest from the Northwest Territories to Labrador, is designated as a threatened by the Committee on the Status of Endangered Wildlife in Canada. The Newfoundland population of marten is threatened by habitat loss, accidental trapping and prey availability.

== Boreal life cycles ==
=== Carbon cycling ===
The boreal forests keeps large amounts of carbons in biomass, dead organic matter, and soil pools. Due to cold temperatures, significant amounts of carbon stocks have been built up, this combined with the further increasing temperatures and disturbance rates will lead to a high net source of carbon that will remain for more than a hundred years. This will result in global impacts which researchers are still uncertain about. Direct effects of herbivores can lead to boreal landscapes as there may be decreased regeneration in some local forest patches. This is altering the input of soils, which could affect soil compaction, and density, or reduce microbial and nitrogen levels in the soil. At high abundance, large herbivores often choose palatable, fast-growing plants which keep keystone species in boreal forests juvenile, which changes these forests.

This moose-led transition in forest age class distribution and composition causes slower increases in net primary production with lower large herbivore populations. This means that they are not only changing boreal forests from carbon sinks to sources over moderate periods. Wildfires have impacts on the forest carbon balance as well, including the combustion emissions and the after effects.

=== Natural regeneration ===
The particular mixture of tree species depends upon factors including soil moisture, soil depth, and organic content. Upland forests can be closely mixed with forested peatlands. The resulting conifer forests are produced by and dependent upon recurring disturbance from storms, fires, floods and insect outbreaks. Owing to the accumulated peat in the soil, and the predominance of coniferous trees, lightning-caused fire has always been a natural part of this forest. It is one of many ecosystems that depend upon such recurring natural disturbance. For example, fire dependent species like lodgepole and jack pine have resin sealed cones. In a fire, the resin melts and the cones open, allowing seeds to scatter so that a new pine forest begins (see also fire ecology). It has been estimated that prior to European settlement, this renewal process occurred on average every 75 to 100 years, creating even-aged stands of forest. Fire continues to cause natural forest disturbance, but fire suppression and clear-cutting has interrupted these natural cycles, leading to significant changes in species composition.

Boreal vegetation never attains stability because of interactions among fire, vegetation, soil–water relationships, frost action, and permafrost. Wildfires produce a vegetation mosaic supporting an ever-changing diversity of plant and animal populations. In the absence of fire, the accumulation of sphagnum peat on level upland sites would eventually oust coniferous vegetation and produce muskeg.

=== Fire effects ===
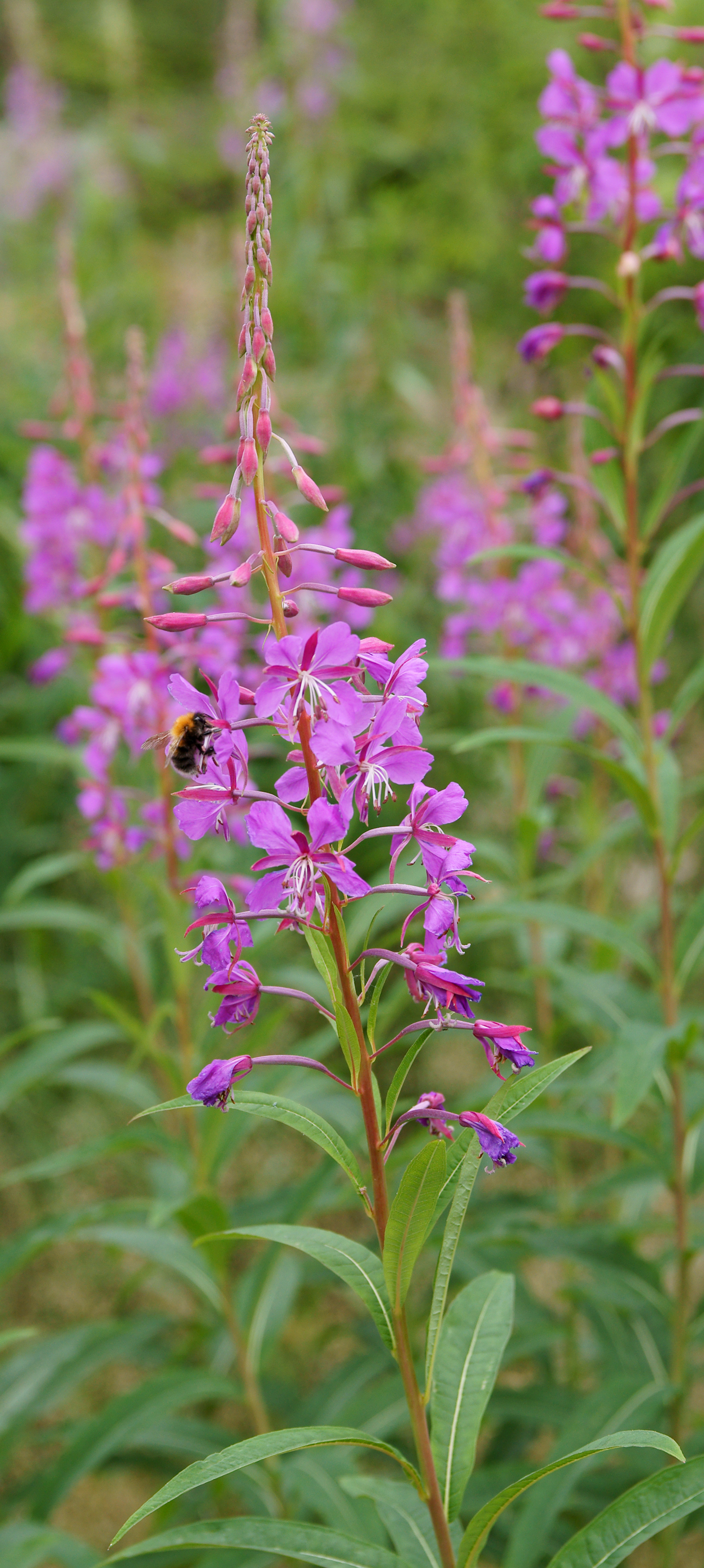
Fireweed is a native wildflower that grows after forest fires.

Despite today's sophisticated and expensive fire-spotting and fire-fighting techniques, forest fires in Canada still burn, on average, about 28,000 km^{2} (11,000 sq mi) of boreal and other forest area annually. That average annual burn area is equivalent to more than three times the current annual industrial timber harvest. It can be many more times that in intense fire years. However, although logging also removes trees, fire is not the same as logging, since fire has been a part of coniferous forests for millennia. Fire not only stimulates regeneration of many plant species, it recycles phosphorus and removes accumulated organic matter. Fire is increasingly used as a management tool to maintain forest health in some parts of North America (see fire ecology). Different parts of the boreal have different burn cycles. The drier western region, which receives lower average rainfall, had higher natural fire frequencies. Hence, more area is burned annually on average in the west than in central and eastern Canada.

When natural burn cycles are interrupted by fire suppression, natural renewal is obstructed and species composition is changed. In addition, fire suppression causes fuel loads to increase so that fires, when they do occur, become more intense. One can argue that fire suppression actually creates a positive feed back loop, where ever more expensive fire suppression generates the conditions for ever larger fires. The negative effects of fire suppression are still under study, and not fully measured, but they need to be considered when making decisions about the future health of boreal forests.

== Economic activities ==
=== Region-wide planning ===
Because parts of the boreal forest region are found in nearly every province and territory in Canada, there has not been much in the way of coordinated planning to develop the region. Prime Minister Diefenbaker talked of his "northern vision" but little was done to see it come to pass. A proposal was authored by Richard Rohmer in 1967 called Mid-Canada Development Corridor: A Concept and was discussed by officials and politicians but was never implemented. In 2014, John van Nostrand attempted to revive the concept.

In the absence of a nationwide plan, private industry and the provinces have pursued development in particular products or certain regions. These include the Athabasca Oil Sands in Alberta, the Ring of Fire (Northern Ontario), and Quebec's Plan Nord.

=== Land ownership ===
Forest land in Canada is largely Crown land. Over 90% of the boreal forest is provincial Crown land; another 5% is federally controlled and includes national parks, First Nations reserves and national defence installations.

=== Industrial activity ===
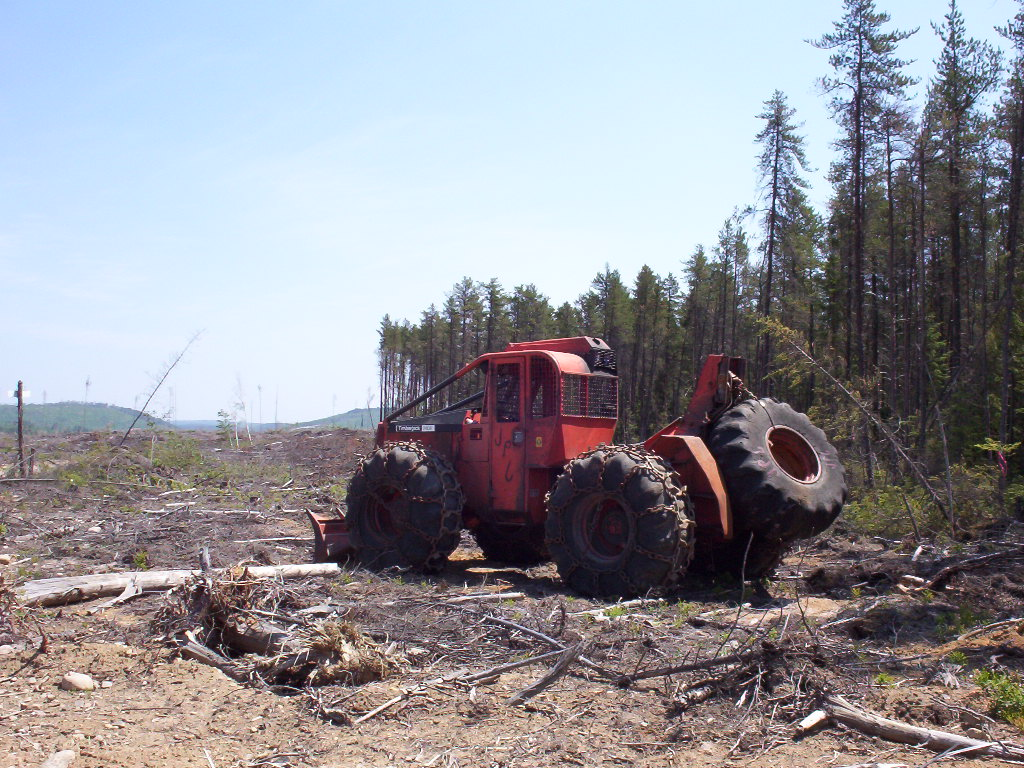
A skidder is used to clear forest and move logs.

About 1,400 communities within the Boreal region rely on resource industries for at least part of the livelihood and stability. Many of these communities were carved out of the forest to support a sawmill, pulp and paper mill, mine or railway maintenance facility. Boreal forestry activities support almost 400,000 direct and indirect jobs across Canada. Forestry, pulp and paper, mining, and oil and gas exploration and development are the largest industries along with tourism, trapping, recreation, light manufacturing and the services to support industry and communities. The forest products sector is one of Canada's largest export industries, representing approximately 3% of GDP, with about half of the annual wood harvest coming from the boreal forest.

Roughly one quarter of the boreal forest is managed for industrial forestry. The remaining three-quarters is either in parks, conservation areas, model forests or is considered non-timber-productive, generally defined as unsuitable for managed forestry or inaccessible. As recently as 2003, it was estimated that the annual harvest in the boreal was about 7,500 square kilometres per year, equivalent to about 0.2% of the total Canadian boreal forest. The sharp downturn in the market for lumber because of the collapse of the housing market in the United States that began in 2006, coupled with import tariff and tax barriers, have knocked the bottom out of Canada's forest industry. In Ontario, Canada's most populous province, where most forestry activity is in the boreal, government statistics suggest that the harvest declined 18% from 2005 to 2006. Given the high number of mill closings from 2005 onward, mostly in Ontario and Quebec, it is a trend that most likely persisted through 2007 and 2008. Most of Canada's conventional onshore oil and gas production, including the rapidly expanding oil sands production in Alberta, is located in the boreal region as is Canada's largest uranium-producing zone in northern Saskatchewan and Quebec's largest hydroelectric generating facilities in the La Grande watershed.

=== Indigenous participation ===
About eighty percent of the Indigenous population of Canada resides in forested areas – including one million in over five hundred First Nations and Métis settlements in boreal zones. Of that amount, over 17,000 work in the forest products industry, mostly in silviculture and woodlands operations in the boreal and other forest regions.

=== Sustainable development ===
Since the early 1990s, a strong impetus has been created to focus on conserving Canada's boreal legacy and sustainably managing economic activity within the entire region. The Canadian boreal is largely intact and available for multiple uses like timber harvest, recreation and hunting. Forestry companies have come to adopt the management practices known as eco-system based management, which takes into consideration criteria and indicators for sustainability – social, economic and environmental. A number of key principles have come to underpin Canadian forestry practices as mandated by forestry legislation, including the obligation for forestry companies operating on public lands to fully regenerate all areas harvested for timber and to consult the public on the preparation of forest management/harvest plans submitted to the relevant provincial authorities.

=== Certification for sustainable forest management ===
As a result of growing public concern with sustainable development and conserving the integrity of the boreal forests, conservation initiatives are progressing on various fronts. The area in national and provincial parks and protected conservation areas is approximately 10% of the total boreal area. Most large forest products companies have certified their boreal forestry operations to one of three third-party, independently audited standards for sustainable forest management:

- The Forest Stewardship Council's FSC Boreal Standard;
- The Canadian standard CAN/CSA Z809;
- The Sustainable Forestry Initiative.

Sustainable Forest Management refers to managing a forest ecosystem in a manner that maintains and enhances its long-term health.

== Protection ==
In July 2008, the Ontario government announced plans to protect 225,000 km^{2} (87,000 sq mi) of the Northern Boreal lands. In February 2010 the Canadian government established protection for 5,300 square miles (14,000 km^{2}) of boreal forest by creating a new reserve of 4,100 square miles (11,000 km^{2}) in the Mealy Mountains area of eastern Canada and a waterway provincial park of 1,200 square miles (3,100 km^{2}) that follows alongside the Eagle River from headwaters to sea. A report issued in 2011 by the Pew Environment Group described the Canadian boreal forest as the largest natural storage of freshwater in the world.

== Canada's boreal forest in popular culture ==
The boreal forest is deeply ingrained in the Canadian identity and the images foreigners have of Canada. The history of the early European fur traders, their adventures, discoveries, aboriginal alliances and misfortunes is an essential part of the popular colonial history of Canada. The canoe, the beaver pelt, the coureur des bois, the voyageurs, the Hudson's Bay Company and the North-West Mounted Police, the construction of Canada's transcontinental railways – all are symbols of Canadian history familiar to schoolchildren that are inextricably linked to the boreal forest.

The forest – and boreal species such as the caribou and loon – are or have been featured on Canadian currency. Another iconic and enduring image of the boreal was created by 20th-century landscape painters, most notably from the Group of Seven, who saw the uniqueness of Canada in its boreal vastness. The Group of Seven artists largely portrayed the boreal as natural, pure and unspoiled by human presence or activity and hence only partly a reflection of reality.

== See also ==
- Environment of Canada
- La Saline Natural Area

== Citations ==
- Culling, Diane E.; Culling, Brad A. (May 2006), Ecology and seasonal habitat selection of boreal caribou in the Snake-Sahtaneh watershed, British Columbia: 2000 to 2004 (PDF), Fort St. John, British Columbia, archived from the original (PDF) on 21 December 2013
- Service, Canadian Forest (2000), "State of Canada's Forests 1999–2000: Forests in the New Millennium" (PDF), Natural Resources Canada, Ottawa, Ontario, ISBN 0-662-29069-0
